= Yashts =

Collection of Zoroastrian hymns

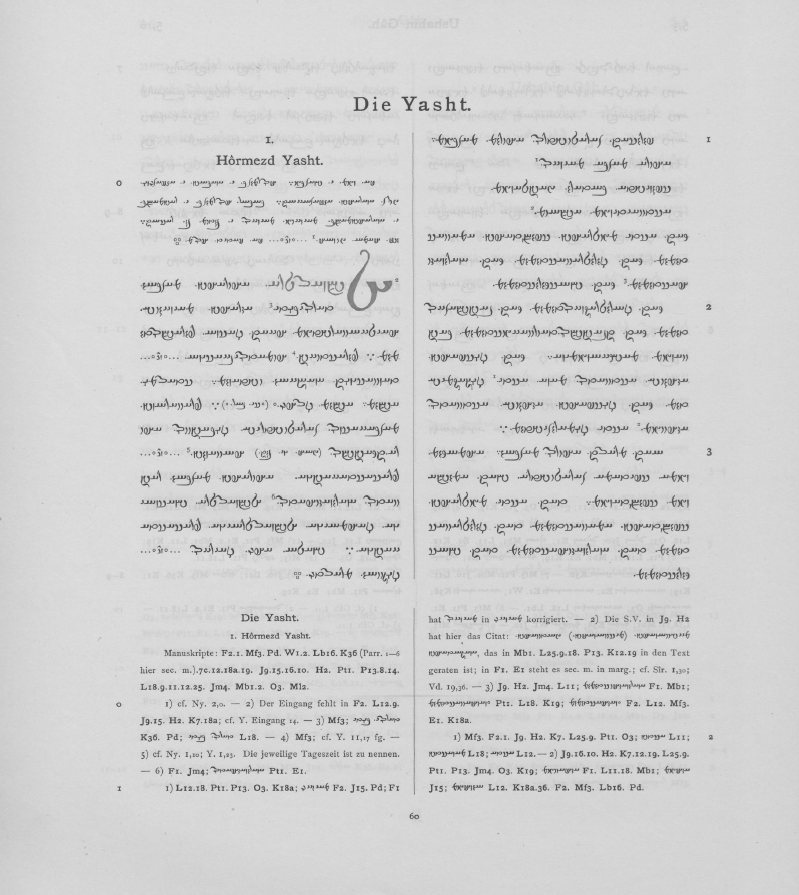
- First page of the Yashts in Geldner's edition

Information
- Religion: Zoroastrianism
- Language: Avestan
- Period: Avestan period
- Chapters: 21

The Yashts (Middle Persian: 𐭩𐭱𐭲, yšt') are a collection of 21 hymns of worship composed in the Young Avestan language and dedicated to specific Zoroastrian divinities. Although they may have originally been part of a High Liturgy, in current practice, they can be recited by both lay people and priests within any setting.

== Name ==
The English word yasht is derived from Middle Persian 𐭩𐭱𐭲 (yšt'). It is a general term for prayer or worship. In the Pahlavi literature, the word is also used interchangeably with yasn, the Middle Persian version of Avestan yasna. Yasht probably originated from Avestan 𐬫𐬀𐬱𐬙𐬀 (yašta, "honored") from 𐬫𐬀𐬰 (yaz, "to worship, honor"). It may ultimately go back to Proto-Indo-European *yeh₂ǵ- or *Hyaǵ-.

In the Yashts themselves, several of the hyms are called yasna, which is likewise a general Avestan term for prayer or worship. Nowadays, however, yasna is mostly used for the Yasna Liturgy specifically. The term Yashts for the collection also originated in modern practice and refers to the fact that all 21 hymns are also referred to as a yasht in the Middle Persian literature.

== Overview ==
None of the yashts did originally have titles. They were assigned later during the Sasanian period, and hence reflect the Middle Persian forms of the divinities' names. In addition, several yashts are — despite their names — hymns to other divinities or concepts. The Yashts have a strong connection to the Sih-rozag. Like them, they have an established relationship with the day names of the Zoroastrian calendar and the respective divinities celebrated on each day.

Overview of the 21 Yashts
No	Name	Yazata	Kardes	Type	Siroza	Bagan yasht (Note: The correspondence to the chapters of the Bagan yasht nask follows König. Numbers with an asterisk are uncertain.)
1	Ohrmazd Yasht	Ahura Mazda	-	minor	1,8,15,23	*1
2	Haft Amahraspand Yasht	Amesha Spentas	-	minor	2,4,5,7	-
3	Ardwahisht Yasht	Asha Vahishta	-	minor	3	-
4	Hordad Yasht	Haurvatat	-	minor	6	-
5	Aban Yasht (Note: The Aban Yasht, Gosh Yasht and Ard Yasht share a number of kardes. It is not possible to determine which of them is the original.)	Anahita	20	legendary	10	*2
6	Xwarshed Yasht	Hvare-khshaeta	-	minor	11	*3
7	Mah Yasht	Maonghah	-	minor	12	*4
8	Tishtar Yasht	Tishtrya	16	hymnic	13	*5
9	Gosh Yasht	Drvaspa	7	legendary	14	*6
10	Mihr Yasht	Mithra	35	hymnic	16	*7
11	Srosh Yasht Hadoxt	Sraosha	5	hymnic	17	*8
12	Rashn Yasht	Rashnu	30 (31)	hymnic	18	*9
13	Frawardin Yasht	Fravashis	30	hymnic	19	*10
14	Bahram Yasht	Verethragna	22	hymnic	20	11
15	Ram Yasht	Vayu (Note: Vayu, divinity of the wind and the atmosphere, is a dual divinity: part benevolent and part malign.)	11	legendary	21, 22	12
16	Den Yasht	Chista	7	legendary	24	13
17	Ard Yasht	Ashi	10	legendary	25	14
18	Ashtad Yasht	Khvarenah	-	minor	26	15
19	Zamyad Yasht	Khvarenah	15	legendary	28	16
20	Hom Yasht (Note: The Avesta has two hymns called Hom Yasht. The other one, also called Hom Stom is part of the Long Liturgy.)	Haoma	-	minor	29	-
21	Vanand Yasht	Vanant	-	minor	30	-

Overall, the individual hymns differ greatly in length, content and literary style. For instance, the shortest hymn has only a single stanza, whereas the longest one has 158. Many early scholars divided the Yashts into older and newer ones, depending on the perceived literary quality. Nowadays, they are often grouped into legendary, hymnic, and minor hymns. Here, the legendary yashts mostly tell stories of ancient heroes who worshipped a given divinity. The hymnic yashts, on the other hand, focus more on the deity itself. Finally, the minor yashts are overall shorter and seen as less interesting from a literary perspective.

== Manuscripts ==
The Yashts are extant through two types of manuscripts; either pure Yasht codices or Khordeh Avesta manuscripts. Khordeh Avesta manuscripts can furthermore be divided into ones that contain all Yashts, the so-called Tamam Khordeh Avesta collections, or more commonly, regular Khordeh Avesta manuscripts which contain only a selection of the most popular hymns. The earliest attestation of some yashts is found in Jm4, a regular Khordeh Avesta manuscript from 1352, whereas the oldest manuscripts containing all Yashts are the F1 and E1 Tamam Khordeh Avesta manuscripts, written in 1591 and 1601, respectively.

== History ==
The history of the Yashts from before their earliest attestation in the manuscripts is unclear. In general, two hypothesis can be distinguished. According to the first hypothesis, the current collection of 21 hymns is the remnant of a larger collection, which may originally have comprised hymns to all 30 name days of the Zoroastrian calendar. According to the second hypothesis, however, the Yashts were compiled relatively late, namely through the Tamam Khordeh Avesta collections. In this hypothesis, a core collection of yashts, drawn from the Bagan yasht nask, was expanded by hymns contained in the regular Khordeh Avesta.

=== Composition ===
None of the yashts have a named author. Instead, they were composed within a priestly culture of fluid oral composition. This means that the individual texts underwent slight changes, revisions and additions each time they were performed and consequently evolved along the spoken language. The compositional unit of these texts was the karde (see below), a coherent block demarcated by introductory and closing formulas.

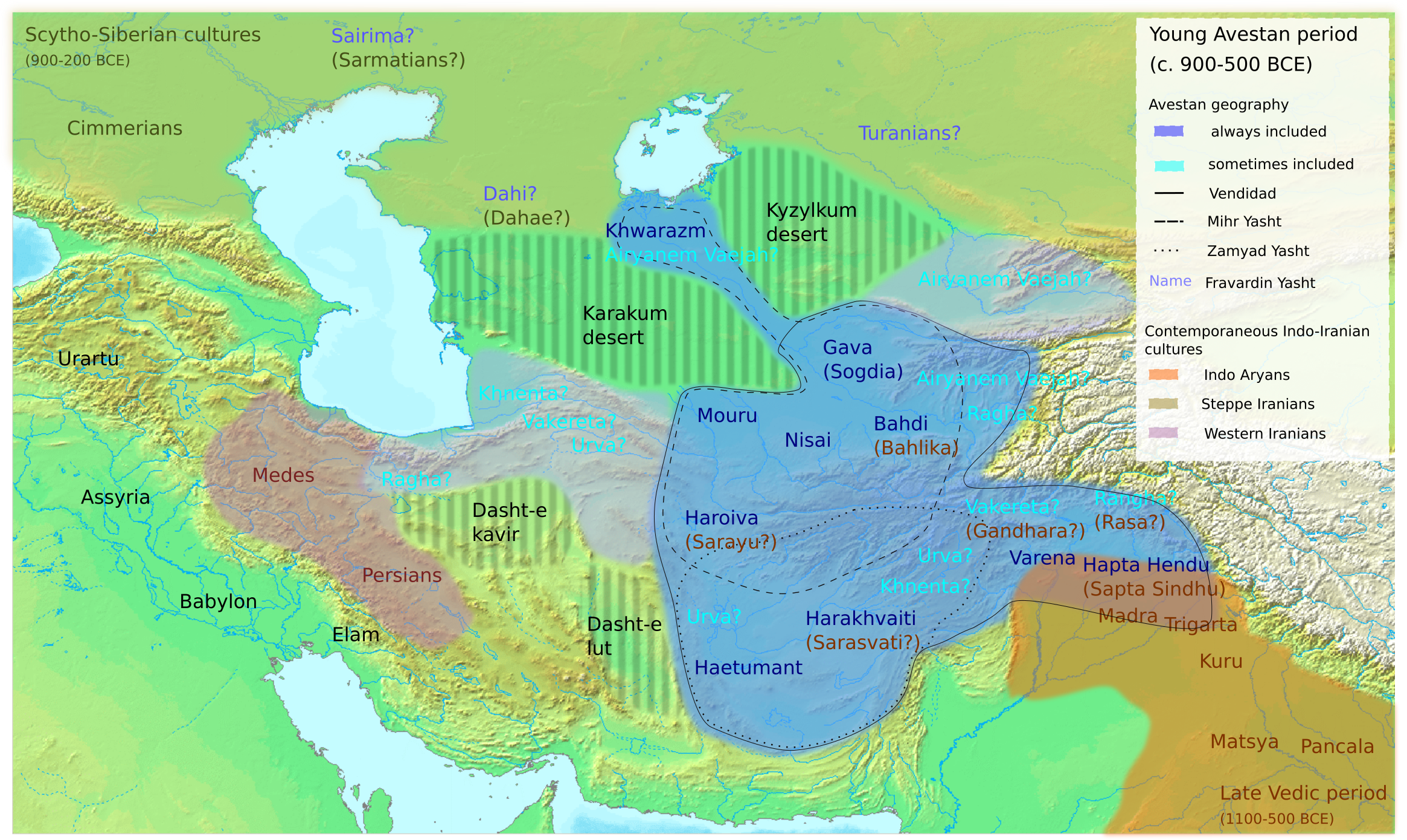
Geographical horizon of the Young Avestan texts including several of the yashts (Note: Sources for the different localizations are provided in the description of the image.)

The geographical references found in these texts show that this process took place in the eastern parts of Greater Iran. As regards the time frame, the oral tradition probably flourished over a long period of several centuries. The total absence of any Persian or Median influence in the texts makes a period comprising the first half of the first millennium BCE likely.

Many of the longer texts contain references that allow to infer their likely original use from the time of their composition. One example is the Rashn Yasht, which probably evolved as a ritual to be performed during a trial by ordeal. Likewise, the Bahram Yasht contains protective and divinatory spells, which were used by warriors before battle. Generally, the hymns present a sacrifice with a do ut des format. This means the gods are asked for favors in return for the sacrifice being made. The sacrifice itself, either an animal or a Haoma libation, is performed by a priest and takes place in the open, on mountain tops or near rivers. The community is assembled while the addressed god is perceived to be invisibly sitting on the baresman strewn on the ground.

=== Redaction ===
At some point, the process of fluid transmission must have stopped and the texts crystallised into a form similar to what we have today. This means that the oral transmission was from then on no longer done by a fluid poetic tradition but through rote learning. It is not known when this occurred, but since the language of the Yashts is still quite archaic, they must have crystallised during the Old Iranian period.

The Yashts have a strong connection to the Zoroastrian calendar. One prominent theory, therefore, connects their redaction and subsequent crystallisation to the introduction of this calendar in the Achaemenid empire during the 5th century BCE. The present Yasht collection would then have been redacted and canonized from earlier priestly poetry. In this theory, the current number of 21 Yashts may represent a reduced corpus from originally 30, one for each day of the Zoroastrian month.

More recently, this theory has been criticized, based on information provided in the Zoroastrian sources. According to the information provided in the early F1 mansucript, 16 yashts of the collection were drawn from the Bagan yasht nask, one of the lost volumes of the Sasanian Avesta, whereas the others originated from a tradition of niyayesh-yashts. Furthermore, according to the Nerangestan, the 16 yashts of the Bagan yasht were used in the Bagan yasn, a variant of the Long Liturgy. This ceremony was based on the Visperad liturgy but extended by reciting the yashts at specific times. According to Cantera, several liturgies of this type did exist during Sasanian times, and the ritual system itself probably originated already during Achaemenid times.

=== Current use ===
Nowadays, the Yashts are used in a wide range of liturgical practices. They can be recited by priests as well as lay people and in a diverse range of settings, like fire temples as well as in private or public spaces. Their liturgical differs from the High Liturgies, like the Yasna or Visperad, which are always performed by several priests, typically in a fire temple, and are dedicated to all Zoroastrian divinities.

== Structure and meter ==
In their current form, each yasht ist bookended by a ritual frame of similar introductory and closing formulas. The introduction consists of a prayer in Pazend followed by a paragraph in Avestan, the content of which depends on the period of the day and the divinity to be worshipped. The ending consists of the Ahuna vairya and Ashem vohu manthra as well as another prayer in Pazend. The main text of a yasht is typically divided into smaller sections called karde, the beginning of which being indicated with red ink in the manuscripts. These kardes represent coherent compositional units and are bookended by specific formulas. In addition, many yashts employ a framing device called frashna (question). This means that the text is presented as a consultation of Ahura Mazda by Zarathustra.

Modern editions of the Yashts further subdivide the text into stanzas according to assumed metrical patterns. The meter of the Yashts is the topic of a longrunning and ongoing debate. An important early study was performed by Geldner, who identified a standard octosyllabic verse line in many yashts. Geldner also used this finding to identify and correct any corruptions that may have arisen during their transmission. This approach has been criticized by scholars like Henning, who proposed a meter based on stress instead of syllables, to account for the many remaining metrical irregularities. This alternative has, in turn, been criticized on the basis of a statistical comparison, showing that octosyllabic lines are too frequent to be a side effect of a stress-based meter. More recently, Malandra has reaffirmed Geldner's theory and used it to analyze the Frawardin Yasht.

== Editions and translations ==
Modern scholarship has provided a number of editions and translations of the Yashts. These works, however, generally focus on the main text of each hymn, meaning that the above-mentioned ritual frame, of introductory and closing formulas, is almost always excluded. One exception is Lommel, who, in his translation of the Yashts, does provide a summary of these parts.

The Yashts were part of the two major critical editions of the Avesta by Westergaard and Geldner. In Westergaard's edition, he left out the Hom Yasht, but included four other texts - the two Hadoxt nask fragments, the Afrin-i Zartosht, and the Vishtasp Sast - as Yasht 21 to Yasht 24. In Geldner's edition, they are edited as part of the Khordeh Avesta in his second volume. Unlike Westergaard, he included all 21 Yashts but also added the Srosh Yasht in his edition, labeling it as Yasht 11a. Since these two important editions, no new attempt has been made to provide a new edition of the whole corpus. There have, however, been several works, which provide critical editions of specific yashts. Examples are the Mihr Yasht, the Mah Yasht, the Tishtar Yasht, or the Frawardin Yasht.

Only a few of the yashts have a translation into Middle Persian and Sanskrit. The exceptions which do have such a translations are the hymns commonly found in the Khordeh Avesta. An important translation into English was published in 1883 by Darmesteter as part of the Sacred Books of the East series. He followed this work in 1892 with a translation into his native French. In 1927, Lommel published an important translation specifically of the Yashts into German.
