= Tishtar Yasht =

Zoroastrian religious hymn

- ← Mah Yasht Gosh Yasht →
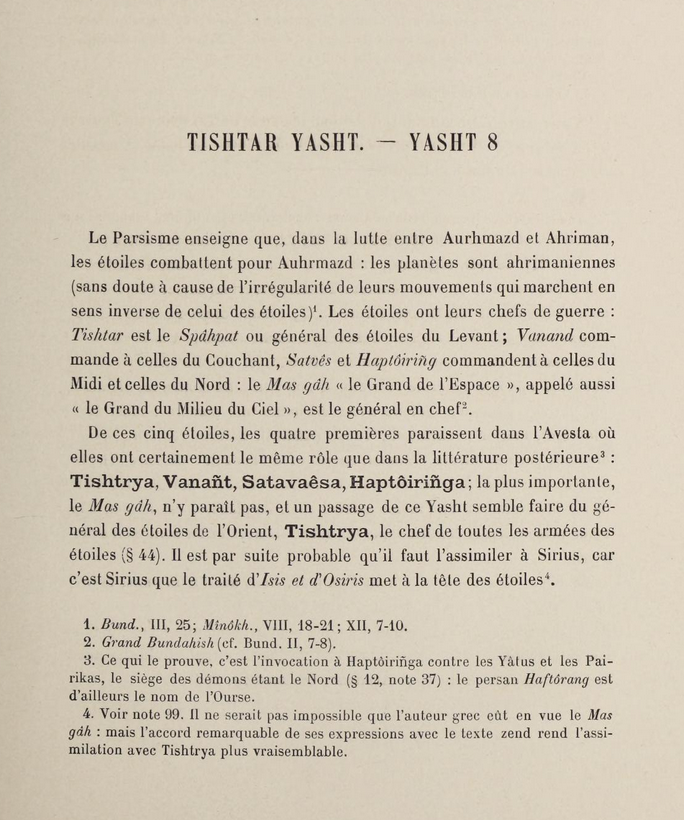
- First page of Darmesteter's French translation of the Tishtar Yasht

Information
- Religion: Zoroastrianism
- Language: Avestan
- Period: Avestan period
- Chapters: 16 Kardes
- Verses: 61

The Tishtar Yasht, also known as Tir Yasht, is the eighth hymn of the 21 Yashts. It is named after and dedicated to the praise of Tishtrya, a Zoroastrian divinity associated with rainfall and the star Sirius.

== Within the Yasht collection ==
Within the collection of 21 Yashts, the Tishtar Yasht is the eight hymn. According to the Zoroastrian tradition, its text is divided into 16 sections called kardas. To better reference specific verses, modern scholarship divides the yashts into stanzas, and within this scheme, the Tishtar Yasht consists of 61 stanzas. Together with Yasht 10, 11, 12, 13 and 14, it is classified as a Hymnic Yasht. This means that its content focusses on the properties and actions of the divinity, which are perceived as ongoing. Like the other yashts, the Tishtar Yasht has a special day dedicated in the Zoroastrian calendar, namely the thirteenth day.

== Name ==
Tishtar is the Middle Persian name of Sirius. Its Avestan name is Tishtrya, the Zoroastrian divinity personifying Sirius. The word is assumed to be cognate with Vedic Tishya. It would, therefore, go back to the common Indo-Iranian period. Its original meaning is not certain, but it may have meant belonging to the Three-Star, i.e., Orion's Belt.

Tishtrya is sometimes equated with Tir, the Middle Persian name of the planet Mercury. As a result, the Tistar Yasht is sometimes called Tir Yasht. Likewise, the forth month in the Zoroastrian calendar is named both Tir and Tishtar. The identification of Tishtar with Tir happened probably early on during the Achaemenid period, however, it may not be original.

== Structure and content ==
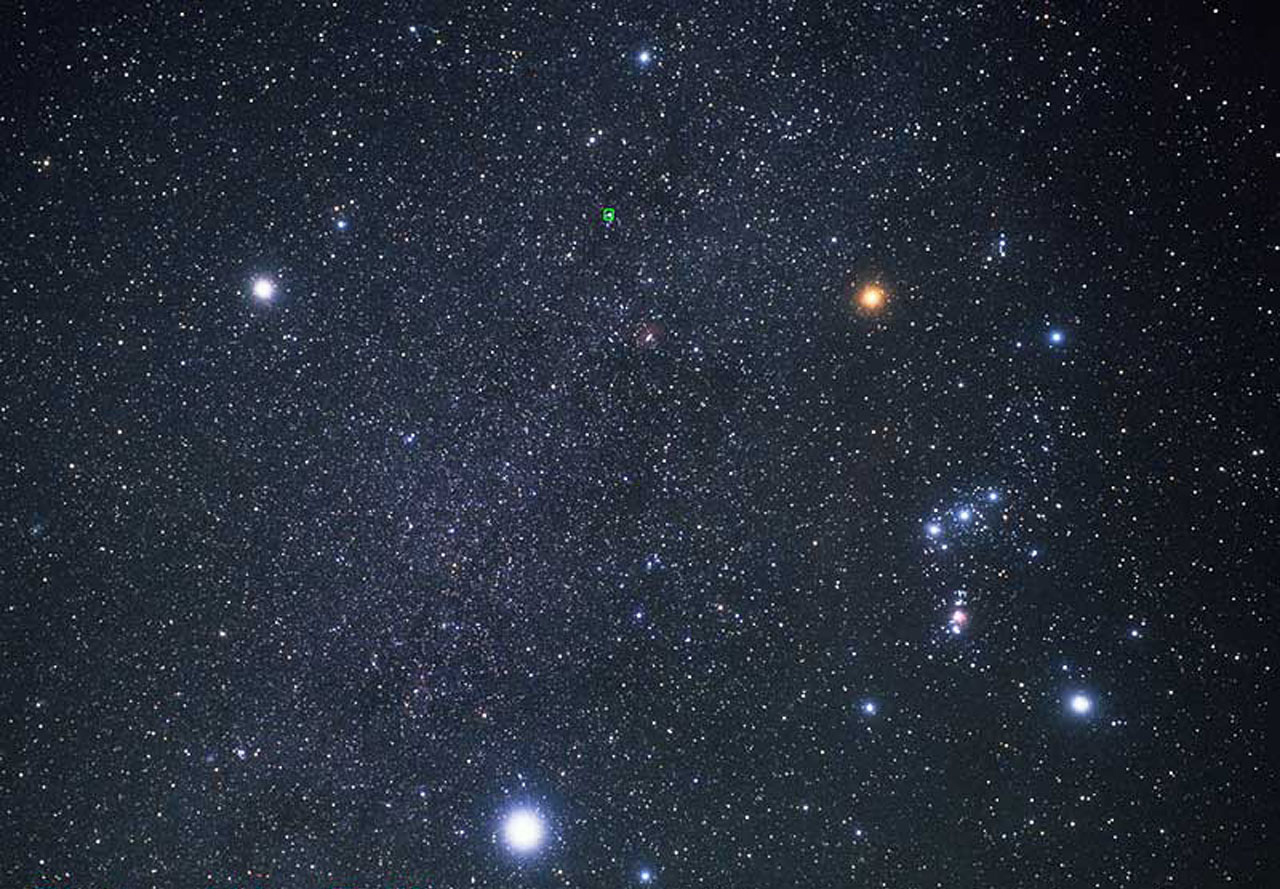
During summer, Sirius (center bottom) rises while seemingly following the three stars of Orion's Belt (center right).

Like all yashts, the Tishtar Yasht begins with an introductory verse (Stanza 0) in Pazend, which announces the yazata to be worshiped and, when performed, the time of the day. It also closes with the common formula found in other yashts, containing the Yenghe hatam and Ashem vohu manthras.

Excluding the introductory and closing formulas, the text of the yasht itself can be divided into three parts. The first part is formed by kardas 1–5 (stanzas 1–9). It serves to introduce the myth related in the hymn. Here, Tishtrya is connected to the arrow shot by the legendary Iranian archer Erekhsha from Mount Airyokhshaotha to Mount Khvanvant.

The second part is formed by karda 6 (stanzas 10–34). It describes the myth of how Tishtrya fights with Apaosha, the demon of drought. The fight initially goes in favor of Apaosha until Tishtrya is finally provided with proper worship, thus, receiving the strength to overcome his adversary. This victory causes the rain to fall again, a feat which shows similarities with the Vedic story of Indra's fight against Vritra. The connection of Tishtrya with Sirius, the end of July, and the onset of rainfall has been linked to the Dog days in an attempt to infer the original location, where the myth was composed. There is, however, no consensus on the topic.

The third part is formed by kardas 7–16 (stanzas 35–61) and can be further subdivided into two parts. Kardas 7–15 are devoted to the praise of Tishtrya, whereas karda 16 describes how the sacrifice to Tishtrya is to be performed. The hymn closes with Ahura Mazda reminding the Iranians of the calamities that might befall them if the worship was to be performed improperly.

== Editions and translations ==
The written history of the Tishtar Yasht probably began during the Sasanian Empire, when a comprehensive edition of the Avestan corpus was compiled. Within this edition, it was part of the Bagan yasht where it may have formed its fifth chapter. This work is now lost and the oldest manuscript containing the text of the Tishtar Yasht is the F1 manuscript (ms. 6550) written in 1591 by Asdin Kaka Dhanpal Laxmidar of the Homajiar Ramyar family in Navsari. The orthographic variants present in F1 make it very likely that the text for the Tishtar Yasht was drawn from a now lost manuscript authored by Rostam Mihraban in the 13th century.

The first modern edition of the Tishtar Yasht was published in 1852 as part of Niels Ludvig Westergaard's edition of the whole Avesta. It was superseded by Karl Friedrich Geldner's edition of the Avesta in 1889. In 1883, James Darmesteter published a translation of the yasht into English and in 1892 a translation into French. In 1927, Herman Lommel published a translation into German. More recently, Malandra published a new translation into English in 1983. Finally in 1990, Panaino published an edition of the Tishtar Yasht, including a critical apparatus of the different manuscripts and a translation of the text into English.
