= Mihr Yasht =

Zoroastrian religious hymn

- ← Gosh Yasht Srosh Yasht Hadoxt →
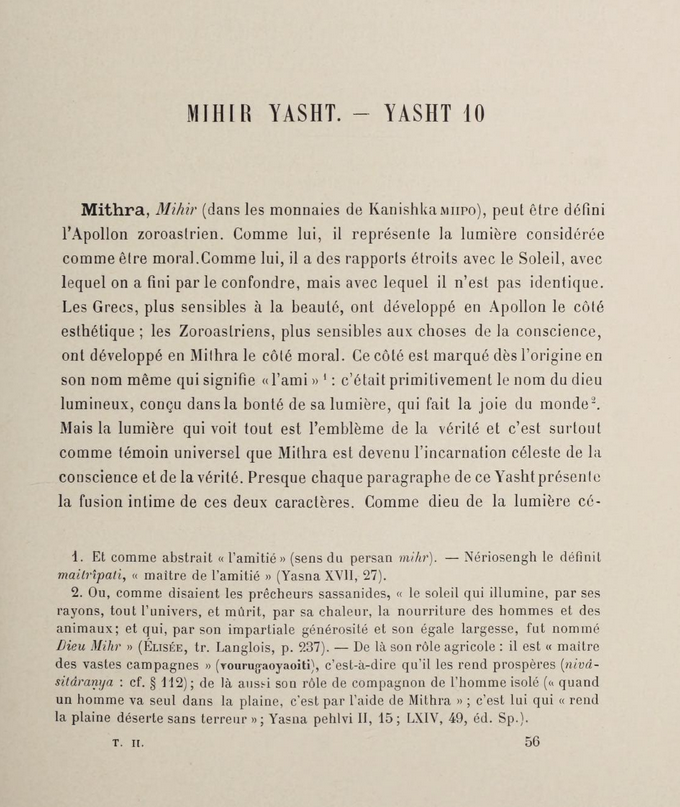
- First page of the Mihr Yasht in Darmesteter's French translation

Information
- Religion: Zoroastrianism
- Language: Avestan
- Period: Avestan period
- Chapters: 35 kardes
- Verses: 145

The Mihr Yasht is the tenth hymn of the 21 Yashts and is dedicated to the veneration of Mithra. It belongs to the so called Great Yashts and, with 145 stanzas, it is one of the longest in the collection.

== Overview ==
The Mihr Yasht is named after Mithra, whose name in Middle Persian became Mihr. Mithra is the Zoroastrian divinity associated with oaths, contracts and the Sun. The Mihr Yasht is the hymn of the sixteenth day of the month in the Zoroastrian calendar. It has 145 stanzas and belongs to the so called Great Yashts. This term refers to the longer yashts, which are often considered to be older and more important. Within this group, the Mihr Yasht is sometimes grouped together with Yashts 8, 13 and 14, into the hymnic group. Some parts of the yasht have been incorporated into the Mihr Niyayishn, the second prayer from the Niyayishn collection, which is also dedicated to Mithra.

== History ==
Mithra, the Zoroastrian divinity being praised in the Mihr Yasht, is related to Mitra, a Hindu divinity known from the Old Indic Vedas. This figure, therefore, already goes back to the shared Indo-Iranian past. Likewise, the poetic elements in the yasht are considered to have their roots in that period as well. Some authors have attempted to distinguish older, pre-Zoroastrian from later, Zoroastrian stanzas of the text. However, this idea, that such phases can be clearly distinguished, has been increasingly criticized in recent times.

Neither the extant text nor later tradition names a specific author for the Mihr Yasht. Instead, it is assumed that, like most other yashts, it was produced within a priestly tradition of fluid oral poetry, where the text was likely composed, altered and revised over a long period of time. At some point, the fluid oral recomposition of the text must have stopped and the material was transmitted in fixed form. It is unknown when this happened, but since all material in the yasht is composed in Young Avestan, it must have happened during Old Iranian times.

The written transmission of the Mihr Yasht began during the Sasanian period. Like most other yashts, it is considered to have been part of the, now lost, Bagan yasht, one of the volumes of the Sasanian Avesta. As such, the Mihr Yasht may have been celebrated ritually within the Bayan Yasn, one of the lost variants of Long Liturgy. Based on the descriptions in the Nerangestan, the Bayan Yasn was an intercalation ceremony, meaning it would have been inserted into the Visperad liturgy jontly with other yashts.

== Content ==
The Mihr Yasht consists of 35 sections, which comprise 146 stanzas in total. Like other hymnic Yashts, it is concerned with describing the actions Mithra in the tangible world and the ways by which the faithful can connect with him.

The Mihr Yasht is noteworthy for providing a lengthy description of the Aryoshayana, i.e., the countries inhabited by the Iranians. It is, therefore, an important source for delineating their geographical horizon during Old Iranian times. The list of countries is found in verses Yt. 10.12-10.14, where the text describes how Mithra reaches Mount Hara and looks at the entirety of the Aryoshayana:

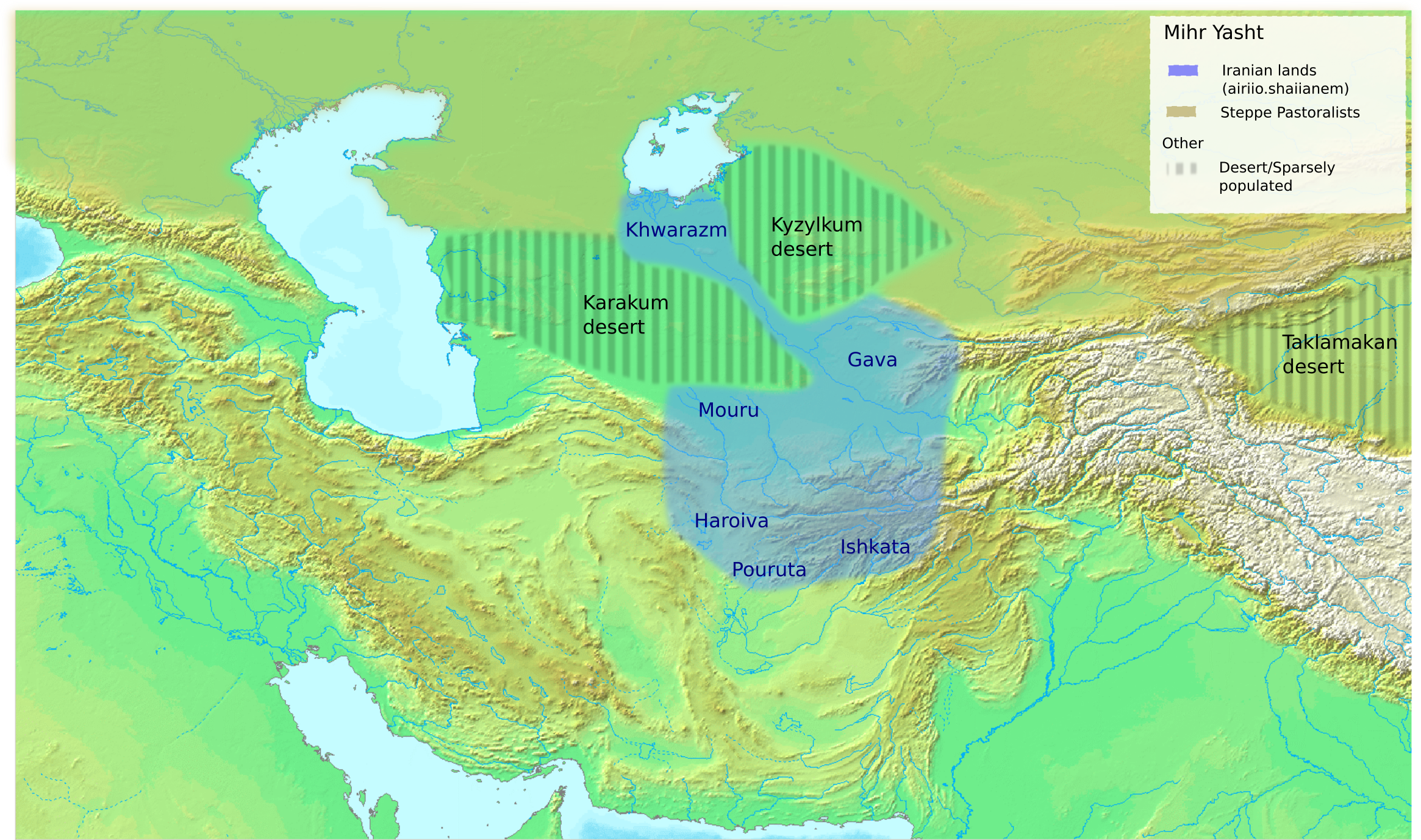
Approximate location of the place names mentioned in the Mihr Yasht

Grass-land magnate Mithra we worship ...;

who is the first supernatural god to approach across the Hara,
in front of the immortal swift-horsed sun;
who is the first to seize the beautiful gold-painted mountain tops;
from there the most mighty surveys the whole land inahbitated by the Iranians;

where gallant rulers organize many attacks,
where high, sheltering mountains with ample pasture provide solicitous for cattle;
where deep lakes stand with surging waves;
where navigable rivers rush with wide a swell
towards Parutian Ishkata, Haraivian Margu, Sogdian Gava, and Chorasmia.

— Mihr Yasht 10.12–14 (translated by Ilya Gershovitch).

While the countries Haraivian, Margu, Sogdian Gava and Chorasmia are known, the identity and location of Ishkata and Pouruta are disputed to some degree. According to Gershevitch, Ishkata is located in the upper Helmand plain, whereas Pouruta may be connected to the Parautoi tribe, which lived somewhere close to Ghor region south of the Hindu Kush. These verses and their central positioning around the Hindu Kush has been connected to a 6th century CE painting of Mithra on a horse drawn chariot found at Bamiyan (later destroyed by the Taliban jointly with the Buddhas of Bamiyan).

== Editions and translations ==
The Mihr Yasht has been made available as part of the Yashts or the wider Avesta collection. The original Avestan texts were made available through the editions of the Avesta by Westergaard and Geldner. Darmesteter provided translations into English and French, whereas Lommel provided a translation into German. In 1959, Gershevitch published a critical edition of the Mihr Yasht consisting of the Avestan text with a translation into English and accompanied by a lengthy introduction and commentary.
