= Frawardin Yasht =

Zoroastrian religious hymn

- ← Rashn Yasht Bahram Yasht →
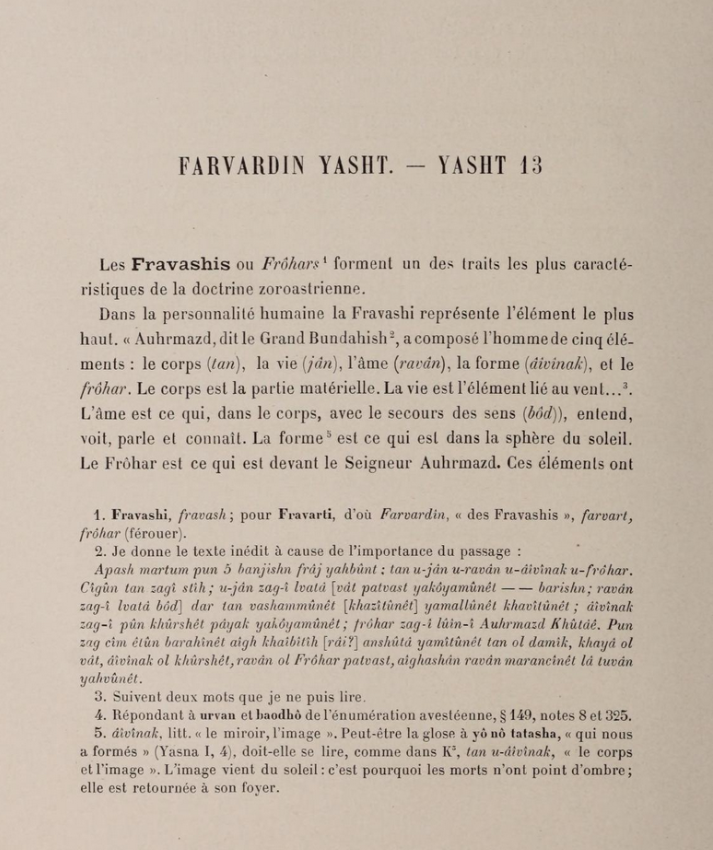
- First page of Darmesteter's French translation of the Frawardin Yasht

Information
- Religion: Zoroastrianism
- Language: Avestan
- Period: Avestan period
- Chapters: 30 kardes
- Verses: 158

The Frawardin Yasht is a Zoroastrian hymn, called yasht, dedicated to the veneration of the fravashis. It is the thirteenth yasht of the 21 Yashts and belongs to the so-called Great Yashts. With 158 stanzas, it is the longest in the collection.

== History ==
The Frawardin Yasht is assumed to be the product of a fluid oral tradition, during which different parts may have been recomposed, revised and added over a long period of time. Some material, like the concept of the fravashis itself is very old and may possibly reflect pre-Zoroastrian concepts and ideas, whereas others may be much younger. The language of the Frawardin Yasht is Young Avestan, an Old Iranian language. This means that the fluid oral tradition must have stopped already during the Old Iranian period and the text was transmitted in fixed form afterward.

The written transmission of the Frawardin Yasht began jointly with the other Avestan texts during the Sasanian period. Like most other yashts, the Frawardin Yasht is considered to have been part of the, now lost, Bagan yasht, one of the volumes of the Sasanian Avesta, created during that time.

== Meter ==
Like with the other yashts, the meter of the Frawardin Yasht is a question of an ongoing debate. While a substantial number of lines are octosyllabic, there are many hypo- and hyper-syllabic lines for which no universally-accepted solution has yet been found. Henning proposed that instead of syllable count, the meter consisted of a stress count as was common in some Middle Iranian poetic traditions. However, this has been criticized on the basis of a statistical comparison of the Frawardin Yasht with poetry from Middle Persian and Parthian, showing that octosyllabic lines are substantially more common in the Frawardin Yasht.

== Content ==
The Frawardin Yasht is generally divided into two distinct parts. The first part (stanzas 1-94) describes and praises the fravashis in general. The second part (stanzas 95–158) consists of long lists where the fravashis of individual persons associated with the Zoroastrian faith are praised.

=== Part 1 - Stanzas 1-94 ===
The first part is devoted to the fravashis in general. These verses are, consequently, the major source of knowledge on how the early Iranians conceived of these supernatural beings. In general, they are described in a way which integrates them into the framework of Zoroastrianism, in particular, the primacy of Ahura Mazda and a strong dichotomy between good and evil. Some verses, however, are perceived as being in conflict with orthodox Zoroastrian teachings. This has been interpreted as being caused by their pre-Zoroastrian origin.

=== Part 2 - Stanzas 95-142 ===
The second part of the Frawardin Yasht consists mostly of lists of important figures in the early history of Zoroastrianism. The yasht is, therefore, an important source for onomastic studies of the Old Iranian people. There are over 400 personal names attested in the Avesta and most of them are found in the second part of the yasht.

== Liturgical use ==
According to the Nerangestan, several of the yashts were once part of a High Liturgy called Bagan Yasn. This liturgy would have been a so called intercalation liturgy. This means that, like the Vendidad and Vishtasp Yasht, the yashts would have been inserted into the Visperad liturgy. Today, the text is still regularly used during funerals. In addition, Andrés-Toledo has identified a so called Dron Frawardin Yasht in the manuscripts. This ceremony consists of a Dron Yasht followed by the recitation of the Frawardin Yasht in honor of the dead.

== Manuscripts ==
The Frawardin Yasht is extant in four different manuscript traditions. First, the pure Yasht collections in F1 and E1. They are the oldest manuscripts going back to 1591 and 1601, respectively. Second, the manuscripts where the Yasht collection is provided jointly with the Khorda Avesta. Thirdly, the manuscripts where the Khorde Avesta is provided with some yashts and finally, the manuscripts which contain only the Frawardin Yasht. In general, the Yasht collections are considered to be more reliable than the Khorda Avesta manuscripts.

According to the colophones in the E1 manuscript, the scribe does not list the Frawardin Yasht as originating from the, now lost, Bagan yasht. Other sources, however, like the Persian Rivayats of Kama Bohra and Nariman Hoshang and the Den i Wizirkard do list it as originating from the Bagan yasht. This tradition has, e.g., being followed by Kellens.

== Editions and translations ==
Like with the other Avestan texts, the oral nature of its texts and the frequent editorial processes throughout its history make any editorial process elusive. A common principle in Avestan studies was the goal to approach the text of the Sasanian Avesta, which is considered to be an authoritative edition produced by the Zoroastrian priesthood during the Sasanian period.

The Frawardin Yasht has been made available as part of the Yashts or the wider Avesta collection. The original Avestan texts were made available through the editions of the Avesta by Westergaard and Geldner, whereas translations were, e.g., published by Darmesteter and Lommel. In addition, the Frawardin Yasht has also been the subject of dedicated editions. In 1975, Kellens published an edition of the Frawardin Yasht with a translation into French. More recently, Malandra published a critical edition of the yasht including a translation into English, as well as a commentary and a glossary of its terms.
