= Den Yasht =

Zoroastrian religious hymn

- ← Ram Yasht Ard Yasht →
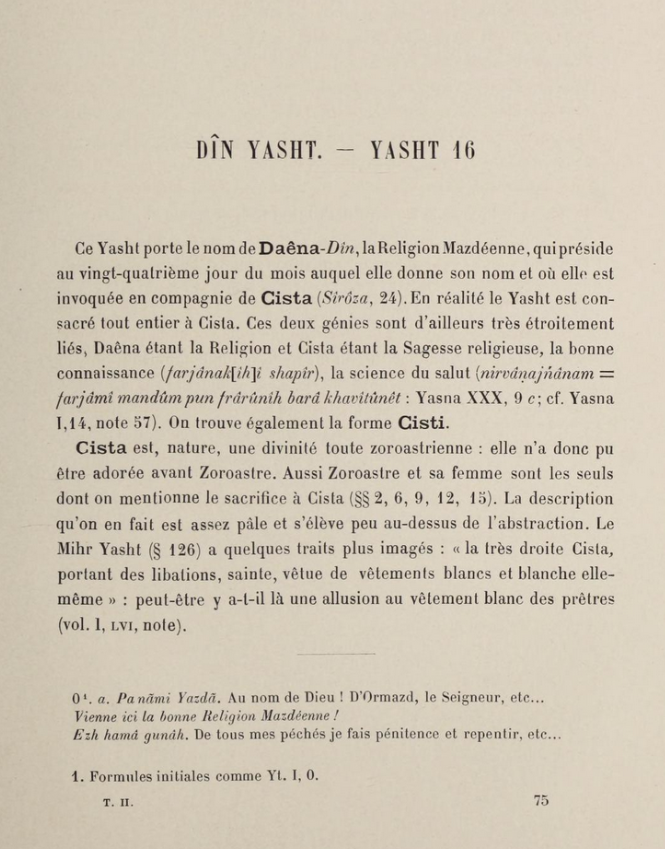
- First page of the Den Yasht in Darmesteter's French translation

Information
- Religion: Zoroastrianism
- Language: Avestan
- Period: Avestan period
- Chapters: 7 kardes
- Verses: 20

The Den Yasht is the sixteenth hymn of the 21 Yashts. It is named after Daena, the Zoroastrian representation of conscience or religion, but is actually dedicated to the veneration of Chista, the Zoroastrian divinity representing wisdom and insight.

== Name ==
The Den Yasht is named after Daena, a complex Zoroastrian concept, variably translated as vision, conscience and religion. Its content, however, makes it clear that it is dedicated to Chista. It has been speculated that the similarity between the two concepts lead to a partial fusion of both, which may explain the apparent inconsistency.

== Structure and content ==
The Den Yasht follows the structure established for other yashts, such that the respective divinity is addressed by prominent people, known from the Zoroastrian tradition. There are however, also strong differences. In most yashts, it is the legendary heroes from Iran's mythical history, which praise the gods in hope for boons related to success in war. But in the Den Yasht it is Zarathustra, his late wife Huuōuuī as well as other unnamed dignitaries which offer praise to Chista in order to ask for peace and insight.

Overall, the Den Yasht is a comparably short yasht consisting of only 20 stanzas, which are additionally divided into 7 sections called kardes. These stanzas can be thematicall divided into three parts. The first part is formed by stanzas 1-4. It contains the only original material, i.e., these verses are not found in other yashts. The second part is formed by stanzas 5-13. These verses are also found in the Bahram Yasht dedicated to Verethragna and have been adapted to accord with the praise of Chista. The last part is formed by stanzas 14-20, describing how, in addition to Zarathustra, Chista is also worshipped by his late wife Huuōuuī, by the Athravans, i.e., the priests, as well as by the (unnamed) ruler of the land.

== History ==
Like the other yashts, the material that make up the Den Yasht is the product of an oral tradition from the Old Iranian period. Its present form is assumed to be the result of a later redaction, where an older kernel was enlarged with material from other compositions like the Bahram Yasht. The date of this redaction, however, cannot be determined. During the Sasanian period, a comprehensive edition of Avestan literature was produced. Within this edition, the Den Yasht was part of the Bagan yasht, where it formed the 13th chapter. This work is now lost, but the Den Yasht survived as part of the collection of the 21 Yashts.

The text of the Den Yasht was made available to modern scholarship through the editions of the Avesta by Westergaard and Geldner. Translations were made by Darmesteter in 1883 into English and in 1892 into French, while Lommel published a translation into German in 1927. A comprehensive analysis was produced by Benveniste and Renou in 1934.
