= Hom Stom =

Zoroastrian religious hymn

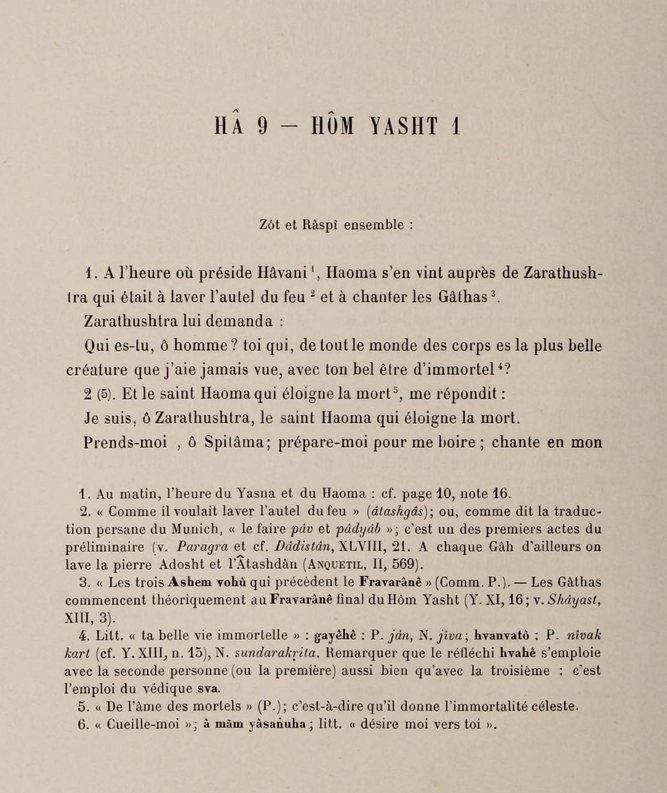
- First page of Darmesteter's French translation of the Hom Stom (called Hom Yasht)

Information
- Religion: Zoroastrianism
- Language: Avestan
- Period: Avestan period
- Chapters: 3
- Verses: 64

The Hom Stom, also known as Hom Stod or Hom Yasht, is an Avestan text dedicated to the praise of Haoma. It consists of verses 9-11.11 of the Yasna and must not be confused with the Hom Yasht, which is part of the Yasht collection.

== Name ==
In the sources, the text itself has no clearly defined name. As a result, scholars use various names like Hom Stom, Hom Stod, or Hom Yasht. Here, Hom is the Middle Persian name of Avestan Hauma, the name of the divine plant of Zoroastrianism and its associated divinity. Avestan Hauma is cognate with Vedic Soma, but the identity of this plant is still unknown.

The name Hom Yasht, used by several authors for this text, draws on the connection to the Hom Yasht in the Yasht collection. However, as Pirart points out, the Hom Stom lacks the typical verse structure of the Yashts, i.e., hymns of worship, which are governed by the eponymous verb yazamaide (we worship). Instead, this text is characterized by the verb staomi (I praise). It should, therefore, not be intrepreted as a worship but as a praise of Hauma. As a result, several authors use the name Hom Stod or Hom Stom.

== Structure and content ==
The Hom Stom is part of the Yasna, which refers both to an important text within the Avesta and the central Zoroastrian liturgy during which this text is recited. Within the Yasna, verses 9-11.11 are also known under the name Hom Stom or Hom Yasht. Verses 11.12-11.17, however, a series of blessings and curses, are not considered to be part of this text. The text itself is accompanied during the liturgy by the parahoma ritual, i.e., the pressing of the Haoma plant.

The first chapter (Y 9) is devoted to naming the early worshippers of Haoma, which is a structure also found in some yashts from the Yasht collection. The second chapter (Y 10) contains a long description of the Haoma plant itself, less of the associated divinity. These descriptions are an important source for the identification of the Haoma plant. The third chapter (Y 11) describes the appropirate portion of the sacrifice allotted to Haoma.

== Manuscripts, editions and translations ==
Since the Hom Stom is a part of the Yasna, its Avestan text is extant through the Yasna manuscripts. The exegetical Yasna manuscripts also contain translations into Middle Persian, Sanskrit and Modern Persian. In addition, the text of the Hom Stom can also be found in the liturgical Visperad and Vendidad manuscripts, since these liturgies are extensions of the Yasna liturgy.

Modern, scholarly editions and translations of the Hom Stom are likewise often provided as part of the Yasna. Examples are the editions by Westergaard and Geldner and translations by Mills into English and by Darmesteter into French. An edition dedicated specifically to the Hom Stom, including a commentary and translation into French, was produced by Pirart in 2004. In 2018, Khanizadeh published an edition dedicated to the first chapter of the Hom Stom and subsequently a full edition, including a commentary and translation into English (publication forthcoming), as part of the Multimedia Yasna project.
