= Hadoxt nask fragments =

Zoroastrian religious text

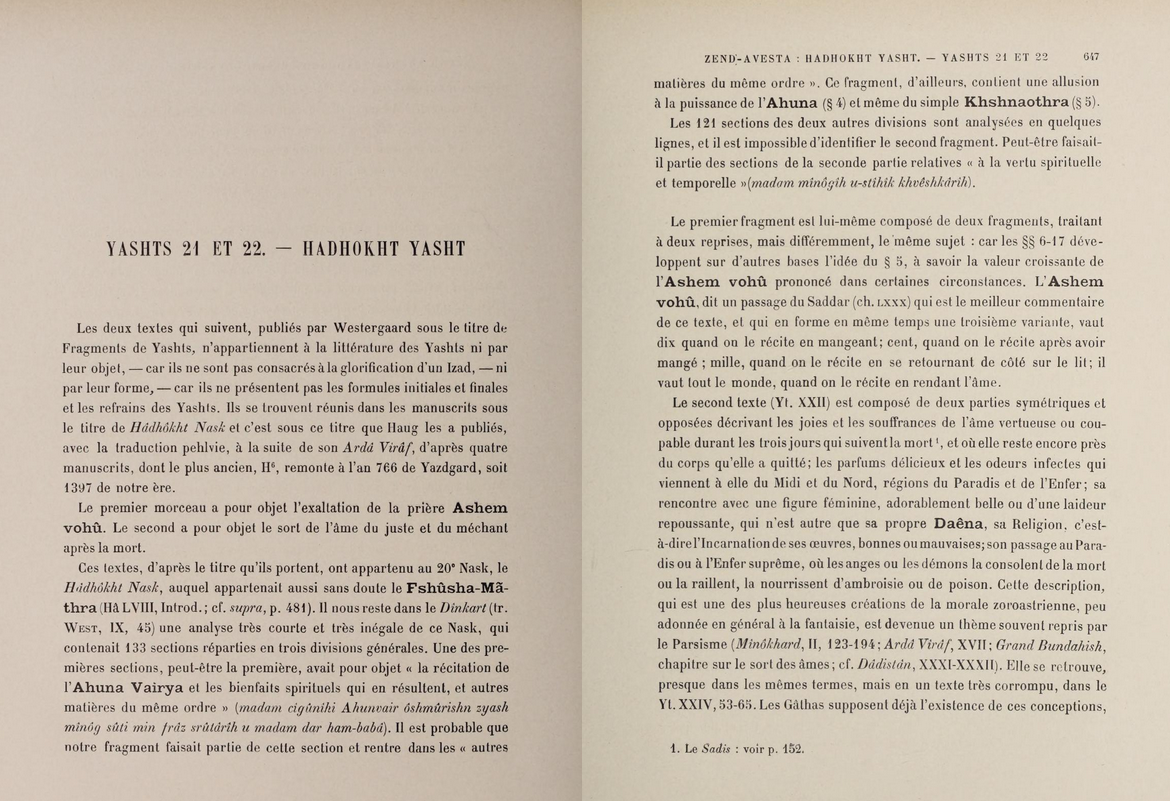
- First two pages of Darmesteter's French translation of the Hadoxt nask fragments

Information
- Religion: Zoroastrianism
- Language: Avestan
- Chapters: 3

The Hadoxt nask fragments, also known as Hadoxt Yasht, are two Avestan texts, which are jointly extant through only two different manuscript traditions. These texts may originate from the Hadoxt nask, one of the volumes of the lost Sasanian Avesta.

== Manuscripts ==
The text of the Hadoxt nask fragments is extant through only two manuscript traditions, both are comparably old. The first manuscript is H6, also known as MH6 or M6, from the Haug collection. It is kept at the Hof- und Staatsbibliothek at Munich. Its colophon specifies that it was copied by a scribe of the name Kamden on November 20, 1397. The other manuscript is labeled K 20 (Rask collection) and is kept in the University Library Kopenhagen. It is extant through a number of copies, which, according to their colophons, were produced by a scribe named Mehrābān sometime in the late 14th century. Both manuscript traditions go back to a singly common ancestor.

== Structure and content ==
=== Fragment 1 ===
The first Hadoxt nask fragment (HN 1) consists of one chapter, called fragard, and is separated into 17 stanzas. It contains a lengthy Avestan commentary of the Ashem vohu manthra. The text is structured using the frashna formula, meaning it is framed as a consultation of Ahura Mazda by Zarathustra. According to Darmesteter, it can be separated into two parts, both of which discuss the same topic but in slightly different ways.

=== Fragment 2 ===
The second Hadoxt nask fragment (HN 2) consists of two chapters, i.e., fragards, and it is separated into 42 stanzas. It too, is structured as a consultation of Ahura Mazda by Zarathustra. It contains a lengthy discussion on the fate of the soul after death. According to the text, the corporal soul (urvan) stays next to the corpse for three days until finally meeting its vision soul (Daena), which leads it to the afterlife. There is a strong contrast between the experiences of the virtuous and guilty soul. Depending on its earthly deeds, the urvan may sense delicious perfumes or foul odors, see its Daena as beautiful or ugly and eventually end up in paradise, attended to by angels, or in hell, mocked and tortured by demons. Due to this lengthy description, HN 2 is an important source for the Zoroastrian conception of the afterlife. It has been analyzed by numerous studies. Examples are the publications by Kellens and Piras.

== Connection to the Hadoxt nask ==
The Hadoxt nask was one of the volumes of the Sasanian Avesta. Like most of its volumes, the Hadoxt nask is considered lost, but its contents can, to some extent, be reconstructed from later references in Zoroastrian literature, in particular the Denkard. The connection between the fragments and the Hadoxt nask was established by the Parsi tradition, which labels them as being derived from it.

However, the description of the Hadokht nask provided in the Denkard does not fit the content of the fragments, in particular it does not mention anything about the soul's destiny in the afterlife. In his edition of the Avesta, Westergaard for instance rejected a connection with the Hadokht nask and labeled them as yasht fragments. In his translation of the Avesta, Darmesteter shares this scepticism to an extent and labeled them as Yasht 21 and Yasht 22. Overall, however, the connection of this text to the Hadokht nask is accepted today.

== Editions and translations ==
The text has been first edited by Westergaard as part of his edition of the Avesta. This edition is based on manuscript K20 only. In Geldner's seminal edition of the Avesta, the manuscripts are mentioned in the stemmatics of his Prologomena, however, the text itself is not included. In 1872, West and Haug edited the Pahlavi version of the Hadoxt nask fragments as an appendix to the Book of Arda Viraf. This edition is based on both manuscripts, K20 and H6. Piras published in 2000 a dedicated edition of HN 2. It includes facsimiles of the H6 and K20 manuscripts, a critical edition of the Avestan text and its Middle Persian translation, as well as a lengthy commentary of the text.

The Hadoxt nask fragments have been translated several times, in particular the second part. A first translation into English was provided by Darmesteter in his second volume of his translation of the Avesta. Therein, he labels HN 1 as Yasht 21, and HN 2 as Yasht 22. In 1892, he also provided a translation of HN 1 and HN 2 into his native French. The Avesta reader by Reichelt contains a transliteration of the Avestan text and an English translation of HN 2. A lengthy list of all translations of the Hadoxt nask fragments is provided by Piras. He also provides in this work a transliteration and translation of HN 2 into Italian.
