= Ram Yasht =

Zoroastrian religious hymn

- ← Bahram Yasht Den Yasht →
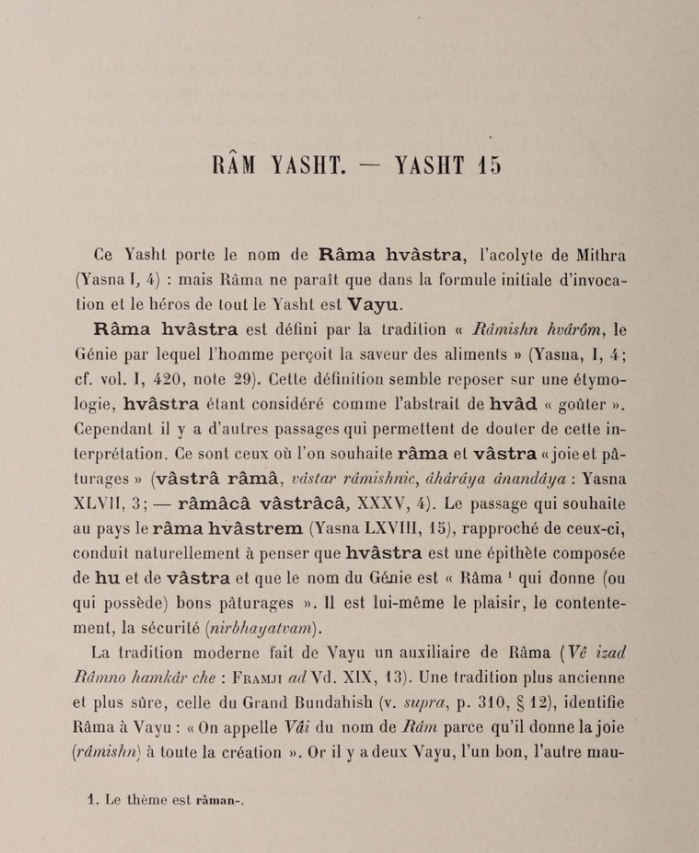
- First page of the Ram Yasht in Darmesteter's French translation

Information
- Religion: Zoroastrianism
- Language: Avestan
- Period: Avestan period
- Chapters: 11 kardes
- Verses: 58

The Ram Yasht is the fifteenth hymn of the 21 Yashts. It is named after Raman, a minor Zoroastrian deity, but it is actually dedicated to Vayu, the Zoroastrian divinity representing the Wind and Atmosphere.

== Name ==
Ram is the Middle Persian name of Raman (Avestan: 𐬭𐬁𐬨𐬀𐬥, rāman), a minor Zoroastrian divinity whose name translates as peace or tranquility and which is celebrated on the 21st day of the month of the Zoroastrian calendar. The content of the yasht, however, does not mention Raman but is dedicated to Vayu (Avestan: 𐬬𐬀𐬌𐬌𐬎, vaiiu). This is one of the two Zoroastrian divinities representing the wind, with the other one being Vata (Avestan: 𐬬𐬁𐬙𐬀, vāta), with whom Vayu is sometimes fused.

The title Ram Yasht is assumed to be a secondary addition to the text, presumably with the intent to align it with the Zoroastrian calendar. It is not clear what motivated the association between Raman and Vayu, although Kellens speculates that it was due to the close association of Vayu with Vata, whose name day is one day after Raman.

== Structure and content ==
The Ram Yasht consists of 58 stanzas, and is further subdivided into 11 sections, called kardas. According to Darmesteter, it can be divided into two main parts. The first part consists of stanzas 1-40, which contains a long list of people who sacrifice to Vayu. Such lists of worshippers who sacrificed to a divinity are typical for a number of yashts, which are grouped into the so-called Legendary Yashts. The second part consists of stanzas 42-58 and contains a list of the many names of Vayu.

== History ==
The Ram Yasht is considered to be linguistically defective. The list of names of Vayu found in the second part of the yasht, for example, consists of many names in the wrong grammatical case. This means that they have been copied from an originally different context without accounting for the new situation. The Ram Yasht is consequently considered to be the product of a late redaction, which must have taken place after Avestan ceased to be a living language.

The written transmission of the Ram Yasht probably began during the Sasanian period, when a comprehensive edition of the Avestan texts in 21 volumes, called nasks, was produced. Within this edition, the Ram Yasht was part of the so-called Bagan yasht nask, where it formed the 12th chapter. Although this Sasanian edition of the Avesta is lost, the yashts which were contained in the Bagan yasht nask survived until today through the E1 and F1 manuscript traditions.
