= Bahram Yasht =

Zoroastrian religious hymn

- ← Frawardin Yasht Ram Yasht →
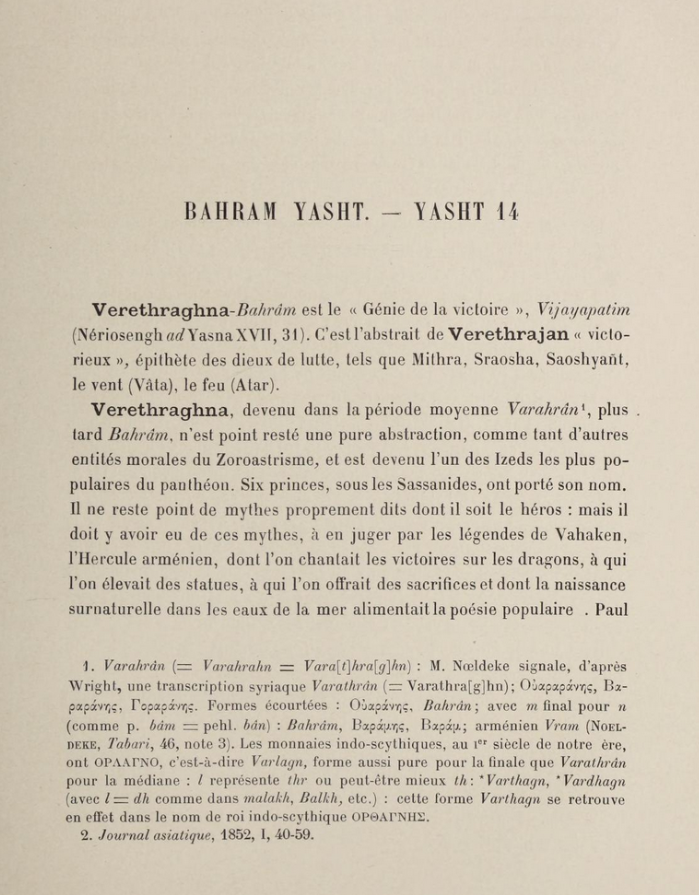
- First page of the Bahram Yasht in Darmesteter's French translation

Information
- Religion: Zoroastrianism
- Language: Avestan
- Period: Avestan period
- Chapters: 22 kardes
- Verses: 64

The Bahram Yasht also known as Wahram Yasht is the fourteenth hymn of the 21 Yashts. It is named after and dedicated to the praise of Verethragna, the Zoroastrian divinity representing military might and victory.

== Name ==
The Bahram Yasht is named after Verethragna (Avestan: 𐬬𐬆𐬭𐬆𐬚𐬭𐬀𐬖𐬥𐬀, vərəθraγna), a term meaning the smasher of resistance and representing the Zoroastrian hypostasis of victory. It is known in Middle Persian as Wahram (𐭥𐭫𐭧𐭫𐭠𐭭, wlhl’n') and Modern Persian as Bahram (بهرام, bahrâm). It is also the Persian name for Mars as well as for the 20th day of the month in the Zoroastrian calendar, on which the Bahram Yasht is celebrated.

== Structure and content ==
The Bahram Yasht consists of 64 stanzas, which are further grouped into 22 sections called kardas. According to Darmesteter, the text can be divided thematically into four parts. The first part consists of stanzas 1-28. These verses contain a list of ten different forms in which Verethragna appears. These incarnations have been compared to the different Avatars of Vishnu or Indra, known from ancient India. The next part consists of stanzas 30–33, which describe different powers that are bestowed by him on his faithful followers. The third part consists of stanzas 34–46, which describe a number of protective rituals that warriors may perform before battle. These verses provide important information on the martial customs of the ancient Iranians. The forth and last part consists of stanzas 47-64 and is dedicated to the praise of Verethragna.

== History ==
The Bahram Yasht was composed during the Old Iranian period within a fluid oral tradition. Its context may have been the sacrificial praise of Verethragna in order to achieve success in battle, in particular against the tribal enemies of the ancient Iranians. The described rituals prominently feature protective magic, like using an amulet from a Haoma stalk or stroking one's body with a bird's feather. These rituals can also be found in the Atharvaveda from ancient India and therefore must have originated already during the common proto-Indo-Iranian period.

The written transmission of the Bahram Yasht probably began during the Sasanian period, when a comprehensive edition of the Avestan texts was produced. Within this edition, the Bahram Yasht was part of the Bagan yasht, where it formed the 11th chapter. This work is now lost, but the text survived as part of the collection of the 21 Yashts. The text of the Bahram Yasht was made available to modern scholarship through the editions of the Avesta by Westergaard and Geldner.
