= Srosh Yasht =

Zoroastrian religious hymn

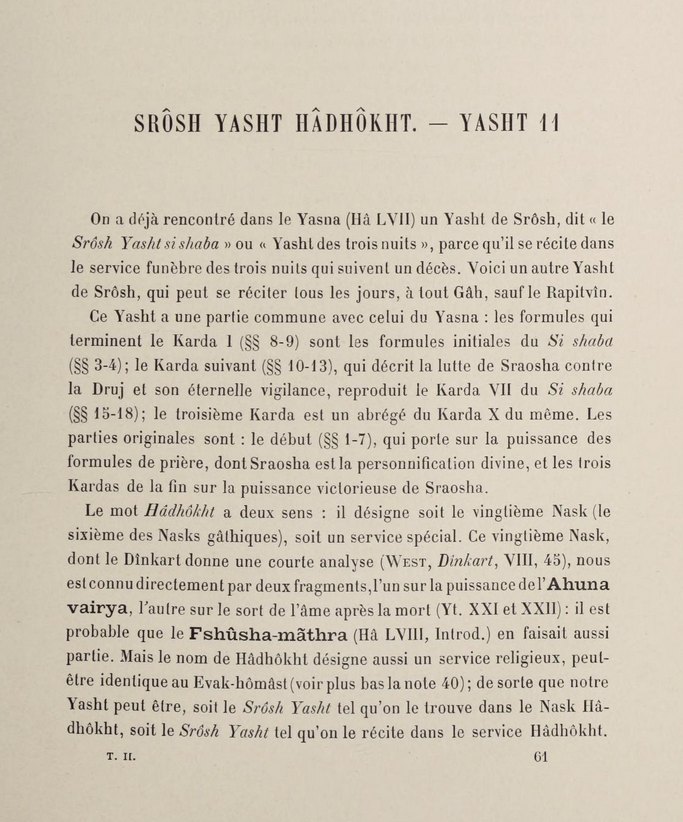
- First page of the Srosh Yasht Hadoxt in Darmesteter's French translation

Information
- Religion: Zoroastrianism
- Language: Avestan
- Period: Avestan period
- Chapters: 5 Kardes
- Verses: 22

The term Srosh Yasht refers to two different hymns in the Avesta, both of which are named after and dedicated to Sraosha, the Zoroastrian hypostasis of Obedience and Observance. The first hymn is the eleventh Yasht of the 21 Yasht collection, whereas the second hymn is formed by Yasna 57.

== Overview ==
Srosh is the Middle Persian version of Avestan Sraosha, which is the name of the Zoroastrian divinity representing Obedience. It is also the name of the 17th day of the month in the Zoroastrian calendar. There are two different hymns in the Avesta collection which are dedicated to Sraosha and consequently both are called Srosh Yasht.

The first one is found in the Yasht collection, where it occupies the eleventh place. The other one forms chapter 57 of the Yasna but is also sometimes grouped into the Yasht collection as Yasht 11a. To distinguish the Yasht 11 from Yasna 57 (Yt. 11a), the former is sometimes called Srosh Yasht Hadoxt and the latter Srosh Yasht se shabag.

== Srosh Yasht Hadoxt (Yt. 11) ==
Both the origin of this hymn as well as its name are unclear. The Srosh Yasht Hadoxt is sometimes assumed to be derived from the Hadoxt nask, one of the volumes of the now lost Sasanian Avesta. According to other sources, however, either the Srosh Yasht Hadoxt or the Srosh Yasht se shabag may have been part of Bagan yasht nask, where they may have formed its eighth chapter. Its name may also be derived from the Hadoxt ceremony, where it may once have been recited.

Like many other Yashts, the text of the Srosh Yasht Hadoxt is divided into chapters, kalled Kardas. Its content is largely derived from the Srosh Yasht se shabag and it is generally regarded as derivative and comparatively inferior. Next to Yasht 1, the Srosh Yasht Hadoxt is the only Yasht with an old translation in Middle Persian. In today's Zoroastrian practice, the hymn is celebrated on the 17th day of the month dedicated to Sraosha. The Yasht can be performed at any time of the day except during Rapithwin.

== Srosh Yasht se shabag (Y. 57; Yt. 11a) ==
The term Yasna refers both to the central Zoroastrian liturgy as well as of the text recited during this ritual. The standard Yasna consists of 72 chapters called haiti, and within this structure, the 57th chapter is called Srosh Yasht. To distinguish it from the other Srosh Yasht, it is sometimes called Srosh Yasht se shabag, i.e., Srosh Yasht of the three nights, because it is recited in the funeral service of the three nights following a death.

Although it is not part of the Yasht collection, the Srosh Yasht se shabag shows a number of similarities with the hymns contained therein. For example, it is divided into 13 chapters called Kardas, which is typical for many of the Yashts but not for the Yasna. Many of its stanzas also follow the octosyllabic meter, which is likewise found in many of the major Yashts. Like the Hom Yasht of Yasna 9-11, the Srosh Yasht of Yasna 57 may be an old Yasht insertion into the Yasna liturgy. Due to this close connection of this hymn to the Yashts, it is sometimes edited jointly with them as Yasht 11a.
