= Vishtasp Yasht =

Zoroastrian religious ceremony

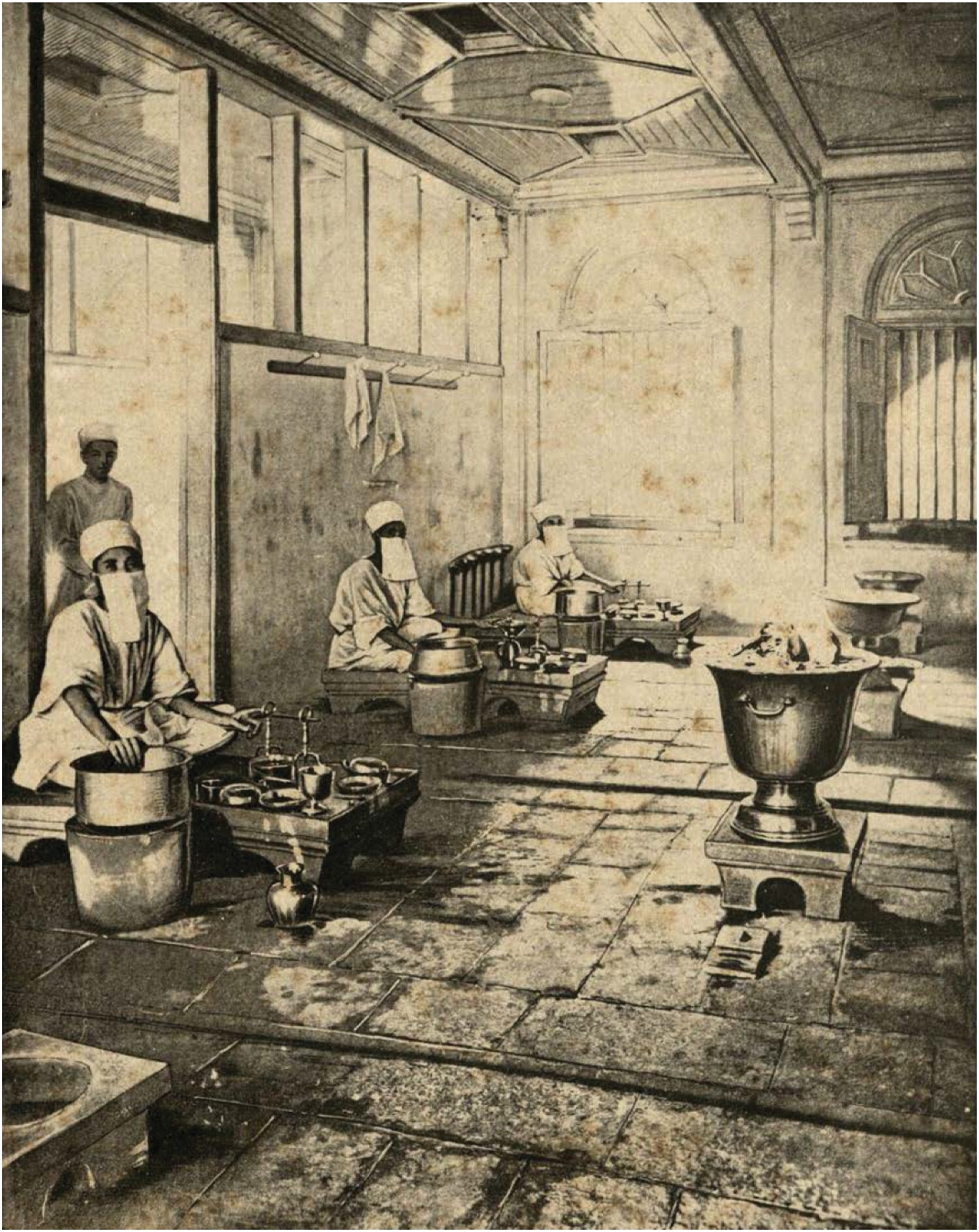
- Zoroastrian priests in the ritual precinct of Maneckji Seth Agiary fire temple in Bombay
- Genre: Long Liturgy
- Date: Ushahin gah

The Vishtasp Yasht was one of the variants of the Long Liturgy, the main ritual of Zoroastrianism. It is no longer performed, but its structure can be reconstructed from the Vishtasp Sast manuscripts, which contain the text once used in this ceremony.

== Name ==
The name of the liturgy is given in the manuscripts in Pahlavi as wštʾsp yšt. This has been rendered by different authors as Vishtasp Yasht, Wishtasp Yasht, Vištāsp Yašt or Wištāsp Yašt. Here, the first term refers to Vishtaspa, an important figure in the history of Zoroastrianism. The second term, Yasht, is a Middle Persian term for a religious ceremony. It is derived from Avestan yašti.

== History ==
The history of the Vishtasp Yasht is unclear. On the one hand, it has been argued that text of the Vishtasp Sast, which is used in the ceremony, is a late and unoriginal text, compiled from other sources. This is based on the observation that the Avestan language of the extant manuscripts is grammatically very defective. On the other hand, Cantera has, for instance, argued that the arguments for a late date are rather weak and the Vishtasp Sast should be considered as an original text.

== Structure ==
The Vishtasp Yasht is no longer performed. However, its structure can be reconstructed from the surviving manuscripts. Based on liturgical instruction contained in these manuscripts, the Vishtasp Yasht was one of the variants of the Long Liturgy, which also comprises, e.g., the Yasna and Visperad liturgies. Within this framework, the Vishtasp Yasht is an intercalation ceremony, meaning that, like the Videvdad liturgy, the ceremony would be based on the Visperad liturgy into which the eight sections, called fragards, of the Vishtasp Sast text were intercalated at certain points.

Structure of the Vistasp Yasht
Yasna	Visperad	Vishtasp Sast
Y. 27.6		
	Vr. 12	
Y. 27.7-27.13		
		Vyt. 1
Y. 28–30		
	Vr. 13	
		Vyt. 2
Y. 32 - 3413		
	Vr. 14	
		Vyt. 3
	Vr. 15	
Y. 35–42		
	Vr. 16–17	
		Vyt. 4
Y. 43–46		
	Vr. 18	
		Vyt. 5
Y. 47–50		
	Vr. 19	
		Vyt. 6
Y. 51		
	Vr. 20–21	
Y. 35-42 (repetition)		
	Vr. 22	
		Vyt. 7
Y. 52–53		
	Vr. 23	
		Vyt. 8
Y. 54		

Apart from the intercalated fragards, the Sade manuscripts of the Vishtasp Yasht demonstrate that the underlying text of the Yasna is also modified. One example is the period of the day on which the liturgy is performed. Whereas the Yasna is performed on hāwan, i.e., the period from morning to noon, the Vishtasp Yasht, like the Vendidad, is performed on ušahin, i.e., the period from midnight to dawn. Another difference is the marker of intercalation. For example, in Y. 3.1, the text of the Yasna is modified in the Vishtasp Yasht such that it announces that it is drawn from the manthric nasks, i.e., the second group of nasks of the Sasanian Avesta. Moreover, the Vishtasp Yasht contains a number of dedications to the Fravashis, Ahura Mazda and the Amesha Spentas.

== Liturgical use ==
The Vishtasp Yasht is no longer performed and none of the meta-liturgical literature, like the Nerangestan, give information on its performance. The reconstruction of its liturgical use is, therefore, only based on the extant liturgical manuscripts. The information provided therein do specify that it was performed during ushahina , i.e., between midnight and dawn. However, based on the ritual instructions, it is possible that the liturgy was also performed on other periods of the day. It is likewise unclear on what days the liturgy was performed. Jaime Martinez-Porro speculates that it was possible to perform it on any day of the year, but a special occasion might have been the penultimate day of the year in the Zoroastrian calendar.
