= Long Liturgy =

Zoroastrian liturgy

Yasna
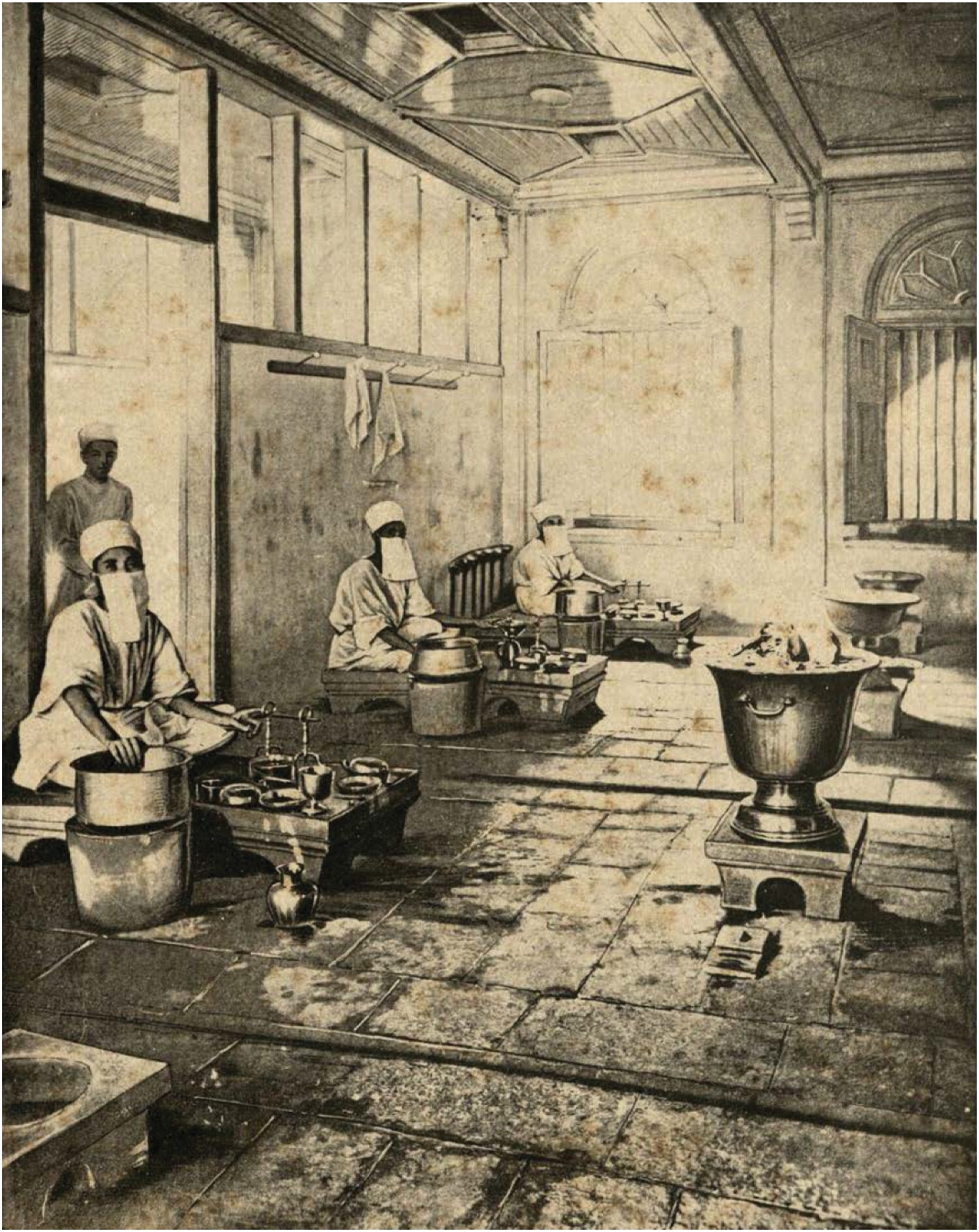
- Zoroastrian priests in the ritual precinct of Maneckji Seth Agiary fire temple in Bombay
- Date: Occasion dependent
- Frequency: Occasion dependent

The Long Liturgy is a framework, which interprets the main Zoroastrian liturgies, like the Yasna, the Visperad and the Videvdad, as variants of a single liturgical structure. This structure is furthermore seen as the primary ritual of Zoroastrianism originating already during Old Iranian times.

== History of the concept ==
Until recently, the extant Avestan texts had been primarily seen as fragments of the Sasanian Avesta. Since liturgies, like the Yasna and the Visperad, do not appear in the Sasanian Avesta, they were interpreted as late and secondary compositions. For instance, none of the major editions of the Avesta present the ritual context of these liturgies.

This changed when Kellens published between 2006 and 2013 a multi-volume edition of the Yasna and Visperad within their liturgical context. In these texts, Kellens calls the common structure of these liturgies the Long Liturgy. He interprets them as original compositions based on the observation that they follow an internal logic and that their textual components are already announced at the beginning of the ritual. Since these liturgies are in Avestan, the general structure must therefore have already existed at a time when Avestan was still a productive language, i.e., long before the creation of the Sasanian Avesta.

The concept of the Long Liturgy has been further refined and expanded by Cantera, in part by incorporating results from the multi-volume edition of the Nerangestan published by Kotwal and Kreyenbroek. This text is a surviving fragment of the Husparam nask, one of the volumes of the Sasanian Avesta and provides information on the liturgical practice during Avestan and Sasanian times.

A critique of the concept of the Long Liturgy was published by Ahmadi. This criticism was addressed by Cantera in a subsequent contribution. More recently, the concept has been used by a number of authors.

== Description ==
Liturgies which are seen as variants of the Long Liturgy are characterized by three traits, which set them apart from other Zoroastrian liturgies. First, they are structured around a core of Old Avestan material, called Staota Yesnya. Second, the central ritual act is the so-called parahoama, i.e., the pressing of the Haoma plant. Finally, the liturgy contains a sequence of individual litanies. The Long Liturgies are primarily contrasted with the Short Liturgies as presented in the Khordeh Avesta.

== Structure and variations of the Long Liturgy ==
According to Cantera, the variations of individual performances of the Long Liturgy can be divided into two groups: core variations and performative variations. Core variations change the type of the ceremony and strongly affect the underlying text. Performative variations, on the other hand, leave the core of the text intact but add smaller changes depending on the details of performance.

=== Core variations ===
The basic text of the Long Liturgy is found in the Yasna manuscripts. Except for some performative variations (see below), it is present in all its other variants. A more solemn variant is the Yasht i Visperad, where the 24 chapters, called kardes, of the Visperad are inserted into the text of the Yasna. In addition, two more variants are known from the manuscripts: the Yasht i Visperad abag Videvdad, or simply Videvdad, and the Vishtasp Yasht. They consist of a Visperad ceremony, where the individual chapters, called fragards, of the Vendidad and Vishtasp sast, respectively, are intercalated during the Staota Yesnya.

Core variations of the Long Liturgy
	Yasna	Yasht i Visperad	Videvdad	Vishtasp Yasht	*Bayan Yasn (Note: This is a hypothetical reconstruction of the Bayan Yasn described in the Nerangestan.)	*Hadoxt (Note: This is a hypothetical reconstruction of the Hadoxt ceremony described in the Nerangestan. According to Cantera, the Hadoxt nask fragment 1 may have been inserted after the Ashem Vohu manthra and fragment 2 after Y. 53.)
	Y 27.6					
		Vr 12				
	Y 27.7-27.13					
			V 1-4	Vyt 1	Yt 1-5 (Note: This intercalation may only have consisted of Yt. 1.)	HN 1
Ahunavaiti Gatha I	Y 28-30					
		Vr 13				
			V 5-6	Vyt 2	Yt 6-7	?
Ahunavaiti Gatha II	Y 32 - 34					
		Vr 14				
			V 7-8	Vyt 3	Yt 8-9	?
		Vr 15				
Yasna Haptanhaiti	Y 35-42					
		Vr 16-17				
			V 9-10	Vyt 4	Yt 10-11	?
Ushtavait Gatha	Y 43-46					
		Vr 18				
			V 11-12	Vyt 5	Yt 12-13	?
Spenta Mainyu Gatha	Y 47-50					
		Vr 19				
			V 13-14	Vyt 6	Yt 14-15	?
Vohu Khshathra Gatha	Y 51					
		Vr 20				
			V 15-16			
2. Yasna Haptanhaiti (Note: The second celebration of the Yasna Haptanhaiti is only performed in the Visperad and related ceremonies.)		Vr 21-22				
			V 17-18	Vyt 7	Yt 16-17	?
Vahishto Ishti Gatha	Y 52-53					
		Vr 23				
			V 19-20	Vyt 8	Yt 18-19	HN 2
Airiieman ishya manthra	Y 54					
		Vr 24				
			V 21-22			
	Y 55-72					

In addition to the liturgies known from the manuscripts, more variants of the Long Liturgy are mentioned in the Nerangestan. This text is not a liturgical manuscript, but a meta-ritual text which describes a range of rituals as they were performed during Avestan and Sasanian times. The text mentions a Bagan Yasn and Hadoxt ceremony, which, according to the description, appear to have been intercalation cermenonies like the Videvdad and Vishtasp Yasht. They have been connected to the text of the Bagan yasht nask and the Hadoxt nask, both volumes of the Sasanian Avesta. Scholars like König und Cantera have speculated whether additional volumes of the Sasanian Avesta, like the Sudgar nask, Warshtmansr nask and Bag nask, could also have used within an intercalation ceremony.

=== Performative variations ===
Performative variations are changes in the Long Liturgy which depend on the specific performance. They are not visible in the exegetical manuscripts, but indicated in the liturgical manuscripts. Since most editions of Avestan texts are based on the exegetical manuscripts, these performative variations had not been analyzed by scholars until recently. Performative variations change the text according to the a number of criteria and are typically announced at the beginning of the liturgy during the fravarane. Examples of such variations are the announcement of the period of the day, the place, the divinities and ratus to whom the liturgy is dedicated, as well as the day and the month of the Zoroastrian calendar.

== History ==
The Long Liturgy grew out of ancient Indo-Iranian ritual traditions. Comparison with the Vedic Yajna ritual shows that a sacrifice to the gods already contained shared elements like the chanting of mantras/mathras; the pressing, mixing with milk and consummation of the Soma/Haoma drink; followed by an animal sacrifice to the fire; and an office for the fire and waters.

Analysis of Avestan sources shows how, already during the Young Avestan period, the general outline of the Long Liturgy had formed. Kellens has, for instance, analysed the textual announcements in the Yasna. They show that at that time, the Yasna consisted of the spreading of the Baresman, the consecration of the wood, the investiture of the Zaotar, the pressing of the Haoma, the choice of the Daena and the recitation of a number of Old Avestan texts. Moreover, the evidence in the Avestan part of the Nerangestan shows that the general arrangement of the whole liturgy was the same as today.

The more elaborate Middle Persian commentary of the Nerangestan furthermore shows that during the much later Sasanian times, the Long Liturgy already closely followed the practice known from the manuscripts. During this time, it was performed by seven or eight priests, instead of one or two as of today. It also still included an animal sacrifice and a meat offering during the Yasna Haptanghaiti.

In the last years, many new liturgical manuscripts have become available, which provide testimony for the liturgical performance of the Long Liturgy from the 13th century onwards. These manuscripts show that only minor variations have occurred during the last centuries. In the last decades, the performance of the Long Liturgy has declined dramatically.

== Editions ==
For over a century, Geldner's edition of the Avesta has remained the standard for Avestan studies. However, his edition was based on the ritually irrelevant exegetical manuscripts, which made an analysis of the liturgical structure of the Long Liturgy extremely difficult. From 2006 to 2013, Kellens, collaborating partially with Redard, published a multi-volume edition of the Long Liturgy, which explicitly accounts for its ritual context. A comprehesive edition of the Long Liturgy, which accounts for all its variants present in the available liturgical manuscripts is currently undertaken at the Corpus Avesticum Berolinense.
