= Bagan yasht =

Zoroastrian religious literature

The Bagan yasht was, according to the Denkard, the fourteenth nask (volume) of the Sasanian Avesta. The work itself is lost, but based on later references, several of the extant Yashts are considered to have originally been part of the nask.

== Sources ==
The nask itself is no longer extant. Some information on its content are given in Book 8 of the Denkard, a 9th-10th century compendium of Zoroastrianism. In addition, the Rivayats, a series of epistles from the 15th - 17th century, give a short overview on the content of the Bagan yasht.

== Name ==
There is some confusion regarding the name of this nask. For instance Yasna 19-21 is also sometimes called Bagan yasht, even though these parts originally belonged to the Bag nask. In the Rivayats, the name is given as Baḡān yašt and Bayān yašt. In the Denkard, however, it is given as Baḡān yašt or Baḡān yasn. While yasht or yasn is derived from Avestan yaz, to sacrifice, the term bagan probably refers to Avestan baga, a generic term for god.

== In the Sasanian Avesta ==
The Sasanian Avesta was organized into 21 nasks, i.e., volumes, which were grouped into 3 divisions; the Gāhānīg (Gathic nasks), Hada mānsrīg (manthras connected with the ritual), and Dādīg (legal nasks). Within this scheme, the Bagan yasht was part of the legal nasks despite its content not being concerned with the law. According to the Rivayats, it consisted of 17 chapters, called fragards. The term fragard here has been interpreted as insertion, indicating that the yashts of this nask were used as intercalations into other texts. Edward William West estimates, that the Bagan yasht consisted of ca. 22,000 words of Avestan text accompanied by ca. 44,000 words of commentary in Pahlavi.

== In the extant Avesta ==
The description of this nask in the sources is comparably short, but it is generally assumed that most of the extant yashts were part of the Bagan yasht. According to Kellens, it contained yashts 5-19. According to Skjaervo, it also contained the Hom Stom (Y. 9-11) and the Srosh Yasht (Y. 57), both of which are part of the Yasna instead of the Yasht collection in the extant Avesta.

In recent years, the Bagan yasht has received renewed interest regarding the role of the extant yashts within the history of Zoroastrianism. Most of the extant yashts are part of the Yasht collection, which is part of the Khordeh Avesta and consequently grouped together with prayers aimed at lay people. However, their organisation in the Bagan yasht as well as references in other Zoroastrian texts indicate that they were once part of a High Liturgy, called Bagan Yasn. Like in the Vendidad ceremony, it may have been an intercalation ceremony, where the Yashts would have been inserted into the Visperad ceremony.
