= Avestan period =

Early history of the Iranian peoples

- c. BCE 1500 – 400
Indo-Iranian period	Achaemenid Empire
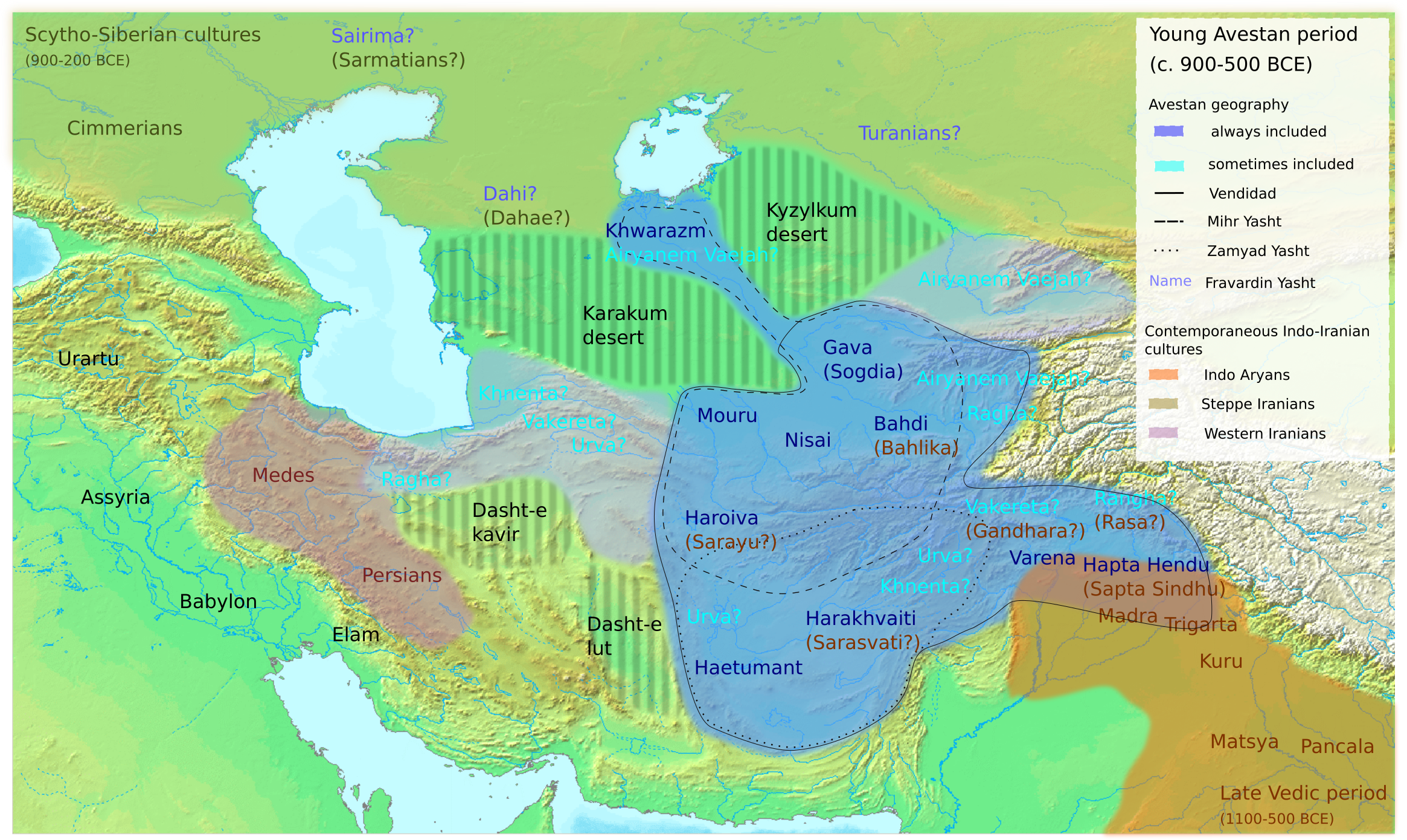
- Geographical horizon of the Avestan people during the Young Avestan period
- Duration: c. 1000 years
- Location: Central Asia

The Avestan period (c. 1500 – c. 400 BCE) (Note: This dating of the Avestan period reflects the opinion of recent scholarship. For a more thorough discussion of the chronology and other possible datings, see below.) is the period of Iranian history when the collection of canonical texts of Zoroastrianism called the Avesta were produced. The period saw important developments to religious thought and to Iranian mythology, historiography and literature.

Scholars can reliably distinguish between two different linguistic strata in the Avesta labeled "Old Avestan" and "Young Avestan". These two strata represent two different stages in the development of the Avestan language and the society of its speakers. The Old Avestan society is the one to which Zarathustra and his immediate followers belonged. The Young Avestan society is less clearly delineated and reflects a longer time span.

There is a varying level of scholarly consensus on the chronology and geographical extent of the Avestan period. Scholarship largely agrees that it reflects the eastern portion of Greater Iran. Early scholarship placed Zoroaster in the 6th century BCE. More recent scholarship, however, places him several centuries earlier, and this dating has become widely accepted. This early chronology would place the Avestan period c. 1500 – c. 400 BCE, mostly predating the Achaemenid Empire of 550 – 330 BCE. The early chronology would thus make the Avestan period the oldest period of Iranian history for which literary sources are available.

== Sources ==
The primary sources for the Avestan period are the texts of the Avesta. All material in the Avesta is composed in Avestan, an otherwise unattested Old Iranian language. The first edition of the Avesta was compiled and put into writing much later during the Middle Iranian Sassanian period (224 – 651 CE). Avestan had long ceased to be a spoken language by the time of the Sassanians, and it is generally agreed that the texts of the Avesta had been passed down orally. The exact age and provenance of the different Avestan texts are still debated, but scholars can reliably distinguish two linguistic strata, Old Avestan and Young Avestan.

=== Old Avestan ===
The Old Avestan material is found in the Staota Yesnya, the central part of Zoroastrinian High Liturgies such as the Yasna and the Visperad. The Staota Yesnya consists of the Gathas, the Yasna Haptanghaiti, and a number of manthras including the Ashem vohu, the Ahuna vairya and the Airyaman ishya. These Old Avestan texts are assumed to have been composed close together in time and to have taken their final form early in the period, possibly due to the activity of Zoroaster himself. The Yenghe hatam manthra and some parts of the Yasna Haptanghaiti may have originated during the Young Avestan time; if so, they were composed in a style characterized as "pseudo-Old Avestan" in order to appear more ancient.

=== Young Avestan ===
There is much more material in Young Avestan than Old Avestan. Young Avestan is more varied, which may indicate a longer time of composition and transmission, during which the different texts may have been constantly updated and revised. When these revisions eventually stopped, the Young Avestan texts "crystallized" into their final shape, and the material began to be transmitted largely unchanged. This crystallization may have occurred in the Achaemenid period (550 – 330 BCE), a consequence of Old Persian- and Median-speaking priests (Magi) who were not fluent in the Avestan language.

However, some Young Avestan texts are considered to have altered after the major parts of the corpus had been fixed. The alterations may indicate composition and redaction by people who did not speak Avestan, possibly after Avestan became an extinct language. An example of late revision may be found in the Aban Yasht (a yasht being a Zoroastrian hymn of praise) dedicated to Aredvi Sura Anahita, an Iranian deity later known simply as Anahita. Anahita became popular under the Achaemenid kings, and some scholars argue that verses in the yasht were added later, reflecting Anahita's popularity and a pronounced Near Eastern influence under royal patronage. A particularly late date is often considered for the Vendidad. This text is assumed to have been redacted by an editor or group of editors who, while having only a limited command of the Avestan language, compiled a number of early Avestan sources, now lost. Apart from such changes and redactions, the extant Old and Young Avestan texts were then passed on orally for several centuries until they were eventually set down in writing during the Sassanid period.

=== Zoroastrian literature ===
In addition to the canonical texts in Avestan, Zoroastrianism features a large literature in Middle Persian. The most important of them are the Bundahishn, a collection of Zoroastrian cosmogony, and the Denkard, a sort of "encyclopedia of Zoroastrianism". These contain texts said to be from the Avesta which are not present in the extant text. These texts are not considered scripture. A large portion of the Avesta became lost after the Islamic conquest of Iran and the subsequent marginalisation of Zoroastrianism. The summaries of and references to these lost texts in the Middle Persian literature are, therefore, an important additional source on the Avestan period.

== Geography ==
The Old Avestan portions of the Avesta contain no geographical places names that can be identified with any degree of certainty. Later Iranian tradition identifies Airyanem Vaejah as the home of the early Iranians and birthplace of Zoroaster. There is no consensus, however, on where Airyanem Vaijah was located, or even whether it was a real place or strictly mythical. Attempts to locate the Old Avestan society are thus often reliant on the assumed chronology of the text. Proponents of an early chronology locate Zoroaster and his followers in Central Asia or Eastern Iran, whereas proponents of a late chronology sometimes place him in Western Iran.

The Younger Avestan portion of the text contains a number of recognizable place-names and references that can be identified with modern locations, allowing a closer delineation of the Avestan geography. It is generally accepted that these place names are concentrated in the eastern parts of Greater Iran, centered around modern-day Afghanistan and Tajikistan.

== Chronology ==
There has been a long debate in modern scholarship about the chronology of the Avestan period, particularly about the life of Zoroaster. While a relative chronology between the time of Zoroaster and that of his community in the Young Avestan period has been established with some certainty, opinions about its absolute place in time have changed considerably in recent decades. It is generally accepted that the Young Avestan period reflects considerable linguistic, social and cultural changes compared to its Old Avestan predecessor. Scholars posit that such change can occur only over the course of several centuries. Jean Kellens gives an estimate of roughly 400 years, whereas Prods Oktor Skjaervo assumes that 300–500 years may separate Old and Young Avestan.

Approximate timeline of the Avestan period (estimates according to Prods Oktor Skjaervo) vis-a-vis several regions inhabited by Indo-Iranian peoples from 1500 BCE to 0 CE. The range for the Old Avestan period represents an uncertainty range rather than a duration, i.e., Zoroaster and his immediate followers may have lived sometime during the indicated time frame.

Attempts to establish an absolute dating have resulted in two different chronologies, one late and one early.

The late chronology assumes that Zoroaster lived in the sixth century BCE. In this chronology, the Young Avestan period would have occurred in the Seleucid (312 – 63 BCE) or early Parthian Empire period (247 BCE – 224 CE) of Iranian history. This dating accords with some Greek accounts of Zoroaster's life as well as with later Zoroastrian texts such as the Bundahishn. Scholars Walter Bruno Henning, Ilya Gershevitch, and Gherardo Gnoli all favored the late chronology.

The early chronology, however, assumes that:

- Zoroaster lived sometime between c. 1500-900 BCE; and
- The Young Avestan material was produced between c. 900 - 400 BCE.

An early chronology is supported by two general groups of arguments. First are the numerous strong parallels between Old Avestan and the early Vedic period of the second half of second millennium BCE. Old Avestan and the Indo-Aryan Sanskrit of the Rigveda are very similar, suggesting relatively recent branching from their common Proto-Indo-Iranian ancestor. Both the Avesta and the Rigveda depict a society of semi-nomadic pastoralists, who ride chariots, engage in regular cattle raids, and neither text mentions iron. Second, the Young Avestan texts lack any discernible Persian or Median influence, indicating that the bulk of the texts was produced before the rise of the Achaemenid Empire in c. 550 BCE. As a result, more recent scholarship now supports an early chronology for the Avestan period.

This early chronology is also supported by an older Greek dating of Zoroaster's life which—while giving an implausibly early date of 6,000 years before the time of Xerxes (r. 486 – 465 BCE)—suggests that the Greeks initially placed Zoroaster in a remote past.

== Archaeology ==
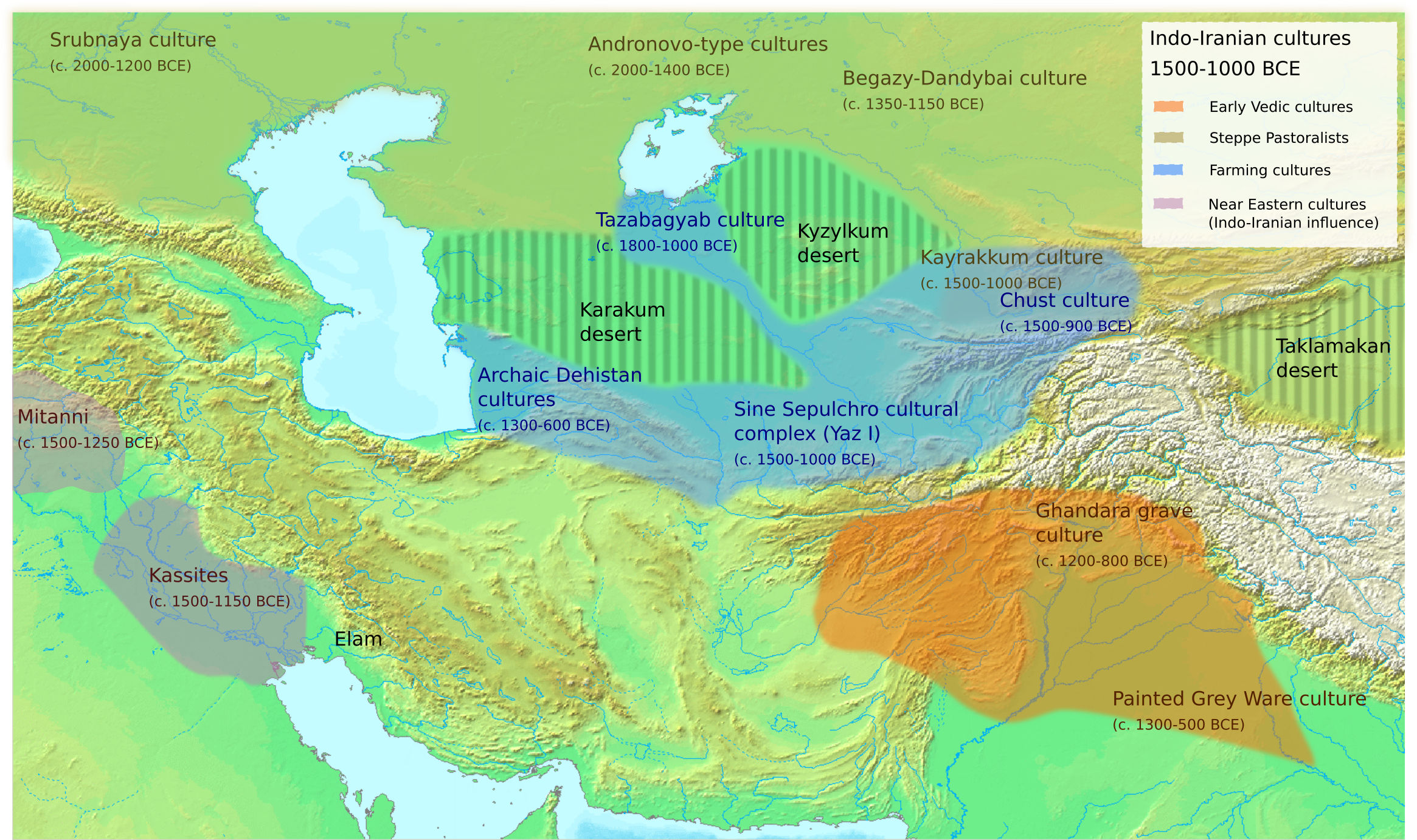
Archeological cultures associated with Indo-Iranian migrations during the Old Avestan period (c. 1500-1000 BCE)

Modern archaeology has unearthed a wealth of data on settlements and cultures in Central Asia and Greater Iran from the Middle Bronze Age to the rise of the Achaemenids. Linking the data to the literary sources of the Avesta remains difficult due to the uncertainty of the texts' provenance, and any identification of a particular archaeological site or culture with descriptions in the Avesta runs the risk of circular reasoning. Modern scholarship thus largely interprets the Avesta only within the broader outline of Iranian history, focusing in particular on the migrations of Iranian peoples. Through the late Bronze and early Iron Ages, these early Iranians moved south from their homelands in the Eurasian steppe. They entered southern Central Asia before eventually arriving in the Iranian plateau.

The pastoralism in the Old Avestan material has prompted some scholars to connect Avestan with the Bronze Age Andronovo culture of the Eurasian Steppe. Southern Central Asia has also been proposed as the geographical range of the Young Avestan period. A shift from a pastoralist to a sedentary agricultural lifestyle between the Old and Young Avestan period, and the interaction of the Avestan people with pastoralist Eurasian nomads of the steppes, indicate a continued proximity to the Eurasian Steppe during the Young Avestan period.

Bronze Age southern Central Asia was home to an urban civilization called the Bactria–Margiana Archaeological Complex (BMAC) which had long-range trade networks to the south. The middle of the second millennium BCE saw major transformations of the BMAC, with urban centers replaced by smaller settlements and a shift to a mixed agricultural-pastoral economy with strong links to the northern steppe regions. These transformations are attributed to the arrival of the Iranian tribes from the steppe. The Central Asian Tazabagyab culture in Khwarazm on the Amu Darya has also been proposed as a location for Avestan culture. Some scholars equate Khwarazm with Airyanem Vaejah, which Zoroastrian tradition names as the early homeland of the Iranians and birthplace of the Zoroastrianism. The Yaz culture, also known as Sine-Sepulchro or Handmade-Painted-Ware cultural complex, has also been proposed as the historical Avestan culture. Like the Avestan culture, the Yaz culture shows evidence of the in-migration of steppe peoples, common farming practices, and—consistent with the Zoroastrian practice of excarnation—a lack of burial sites.

== Society ==
=== Old Avestan period ===
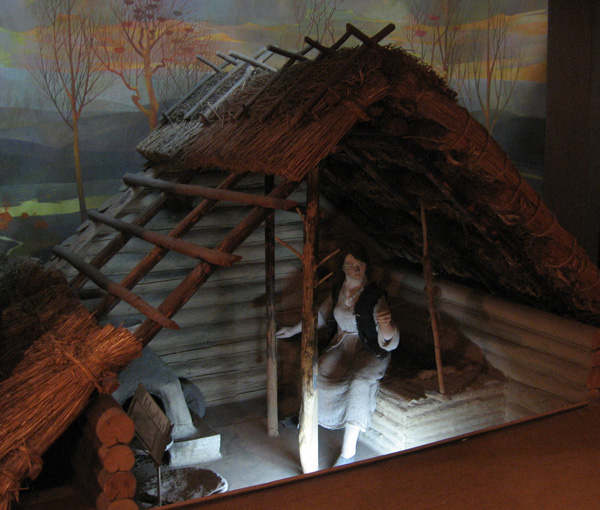
Reconstructed pit-house of the Srubnaya culture, an example of early Iranic steppe pastoralists.

The Old Avestan texts reflect the perspective of a pastoralist society. The cow is of primary importance and considered sacred. In addition to cattle, livestock like sheep and goats are mentioned in the texts. Hippophoric names like Vishtaspa, Pourushaspa and Haecataspa (āspa, "horse") show the value placed on horses. In addition, camelophoric names like Zarathustra and Frahaostra (uštra, "camel") show the importance of the Bactrian camel, an animal well adapted to the harsh conditions of the steppe and desert regions of Central Asia.

Kinship is perceived as concentric circles, with the innermost being the family (xvaētu), followed by the clan (vərəzə̄na) and the outermost being the tribe (airyaman). These kinship groups may relate to geographical distinctions, with the family sharing a home (dəmāna), the clan living in a settlement (vīs), and the tribe living jointly in a land (dahyu). There is a clear delineation between priest on one side and warrior-herdsmen on the other. However, it is not clear whether the later group is further separated like in the related Young Avestan and Vedic societies. In the non-Zoroastrian Old Avestan society, priests are generally called karapan, whereas an officiating priest is called zaotar (compare Sanskrit: hotar) and manthras are uttered by priests called mąθran (compare Sanskrit: mántrin).

There is no mention of horse riding but several allusion to chariots and chariot races are made. The Old Avestan people knew metal working. Like the Old Vedic term for metal ayas, the meaning of the Old Avestan term aiiah is unknown, but it has been interpreted as copper/bronze, consistent with a setting in the Bronze Age.

=== Young Avestan period ===
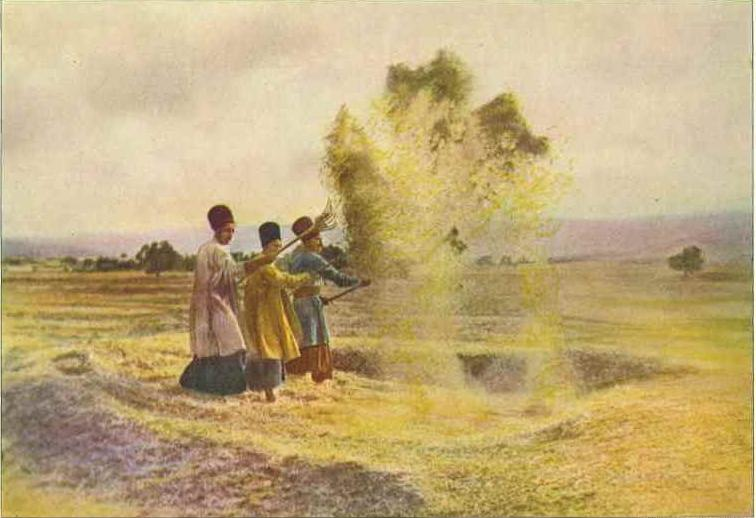
Colorized picture of farmers winnowing grain in Southern Iran, 1921.

The Young Avestan texts present a substantially different perspective. Society is now mostly sedentary and numerous references are being made to settlements and larger buildings. Agriculture is very prominent and the texts name activities like ploughing, irrigating, seeding, harvesting and winnowing. Mentioned are grains like barley (yava) and wheat (gantuma). The Vendidad specifically states how "who sows grain sows Asha" and how it is equivalent to "ten thousand Yenghe hatam manthras". In addition, montane transhumance of cattle, sheep and goats is practiced and each September a feast similar to Almabtrieb (ayāθrima, "driving in") is celebrated, after which the livestock is kept in stables during the winter.

Young Avestan society has similar concentric circles of kinship; the family (nmāna), clan (vīs) and the tribe (zantu). Together with term for land (dahyu), they are related to the Old Avestan geographical distinctions. There is now a distinct tripartite division of the society into priests (Avestan: āθravan, Sanskrit: aθaravan, "fire priest"), warriors (Avestan: raθaēštar, Sanskrit: raθešta, "he who stands in a raθa"), and commoners (vāstryō.fšuyant, "he who fattens cattle on pastures"). Despite the same division and the same general terms existing in the Vedic society, the specific names for priests, warriors and commoners are different, which may reflect an independent development of the two systems. There is a single passage in the Avesta that names a fourth class, namely the craftsmen (huiti).

Society appears to be very warlike and numerous references are made to battles with nomadic raiders. Asking the gods for favors related to war is the most common request found in the Young Avestan texts. Before battle, warriors apply protective magic to shield themselves from hostile weapons. Some of these magic rituals, like using an amulet from a Haoma stalk or stroking one's body with a bird's feather, were also used by the Vedic people as described in the Atharvaveda. The army is organized at the level of clans and tribes. They march into battle with uplifted banners. Chiefs ride chariots, while commoners fight on foot and warriors on horseback. Weapons include spears, maces and short swords. There is no mention of logistics, and military campaigns were probably only organized on a small scale.

In the Young Avestan society, a number of features associated with Zoroastrianism, like the killing of noxious animals, purity laws, the veneration of the dog, and a strong dichotomy between good and evil, are already fully present. Great emphasis is placed on procreation, and sexual activities that are not conducive to this goal, such as masturbation, homosexuality and prostitution, are strongly condemned. One of the most salient elements of the Young Avestan society was the promotion of next-of-kin marriage (xᵛae.tuuadaθa), even between direct relatives. Although it is not clear to what extent it was practiced by common people, it has been speculated that this custom was part of an identity-building process in which the customs of closely related Indo-Iranian groups were deliberately inverted.

== Arya and Iranian identity ==
The people of the Avesta consistently use the term Arya (Avestan: 𐬀𐬌𐬭𐬌𐬌𐬀, airiia) as an endonym. In Western Iran, the same term (Old Persian: 𐎠𐎼𐎡𐎹, ariyaʰ) appears in the 6th and 5th century BCE in several inscriptions by Darius and Xerxes. In the inscriptions, the use of the word Arya already indicates a sense of a wider, shared cultural space; modern scholars interpret Avestan and Old Persian Arya as the expression of a distinct Iranian identity. This identification of Arya with "Iranian" is, however, context-specific.

The term Arya (Sanskrit: आर्य, ārya) also appears in ancient India as the endonym of people in the Vedic period. The people of the Vedas—the oldest Hindu scripture, composed in Sanskrit—and the people of the Avesta share a wide range of linguistic, social, religious, and cultural similarities. Scholars, therefore, conclude that the two branched from an older Indo-Iranian people. It is not known if these two peoples continued to interact after their branching, since neither the Avesta nor the Vedas make any unambiguous reference to the other group.

The Avesta also mentions a number of people with whom the Arya were in continuous contact called the Turiia, Sairima, Sainu and Dahi. All appear to be Iranian-speaking peoples. The Turiia are the Turanians of later legends, and were said to live in Transoxiana, the Central Asian historical region between the Amu Darya (or Oxus) and Syr Darya rivers. The Sairima and Dahi have been connected with the Sarmatians and Dahae by linguistics. The identity of the Sainu, however, is unknown. Scholars connect these peoples with Iranic nomads of the Scytho-Siberian world who lived in the steppe zone of northern Central Asia.

== Religion ==
Zoroaster was an innovator or reformer within the Ancient Iranian religion. There are no direct sources on the religious beliefs of the Iranian peoples before Zoroaster, but scholars use allusions from Zoroastrian texts and comparisons with the historical Vedic religion of Ancient India. Similarities in rituals of Zoroastrianism and the Vedic religion suggest a common origin in the Proto-Indo-Iranian religion. The exact nature of Zoroaster's reforms remains a subject of scholarly debate, but the hostility described by the early Zoroastrian community suggests that the reforms were substantial. A prime target of Zoroaster's criticism was the Iranian cult of the daevas. These supernatural beings appear in the Vedic religion and in later Hinduism as gods called devas, and it is assumed that they had at some point also been the gods of the Iranian peoples.

=== Old Avestan period ===
The religious teachings of Zoroaster center around a supreme deity called Mazda (Avestan: 𐬨𐬀𐬰𐬛𐬃, "Wise One") or Ahura (Avestan: 𐬀𐬵𐬎𐬭𐬋, "Lord"), and the establishment of a strict cosmological dualism—the opposition of Good and Evil. Zoroaster's teachings, therefore, contain both monotheistic and dualistic elements. There is no consensus on the origin of Mazda, who does not appear in the Vedic religion. Some scholars accept that the god may be a religious innovation of Zoroaster; others believe that Mazda is the Iranian counterpart of the Vedic Varuna; still others maintain that he represents an early Iranian innovation distinct from the Vedic tradition. The dualism expressed in the Gathas exist both within the contrast between Asha (Avestan: 𐬀𐬴𐬀, "truth, order") and Druj (Avestan: 𐬛𐬭𐬎𐬘, "lie, deceit") as well as between Vohu Manah ("good mind") and Aka Manah ("bad mind"). While Asha and Druj have counterparts in Vedic Ṛta and druh, both concepts have a more prominent and expanded role in Zoroaster's thinking. The Gathas use the term ahura for both Mazda and for some of the supernatural entities called Amesha Spentas associated with him. And as with the deavas, these ahuras have an Ancient Indian equivalent in the asuras. During the Old Vedic period, both the devas and asuras were considered gods, but the asuras became demonized in the Late Vedic period, a process that parallels the demonization of the daevas in Ancient Iran.

=== Young Avestan period ===
The religious practices described in the Young Avestan texts exhibit elements that can be closely associated with Zoroastrianism. The dualism of the Old Avestan texts is now expressed in the divine sphere as the opposition between Ahura Mazda, whose name is now fixed, and Angra Mainyu (Avestan: 𐬀𐬢𐬭𐬀⸱𐬨𐬀𐬌𐬥𐬌𐬌𐬎, "Evil Spirit"), who only vaguely appeared in the Gathas. The most striking difference, however, between these and the Old Avestan texts are the numerous deities called yazata (Avestan: 𐬫𐬀𐬰𐬀𐬙𐬀, "one worthy of worship"). These deities add a pronounced polytheistic element to the religion. Some of these deities have counterparts in the Vedic religion whereas others may be Iranian innovations. There is no consensus on how and why these deities appear in the Younger Avestan texts. Scholars including Mary Boyce believe they reflects a continuation of Zoroaster's teaching. In contrast, Ilya Gershevitch and others maintain that the Young Avestan Zoroastrianism is a syncretistic religion which emerged as a fusion of Zoroaster's monotheistic and dualistic teachings with the traditional Iranian polytheism that Zoroastrianism absorbed as it spread.

== Avestan worldview ==
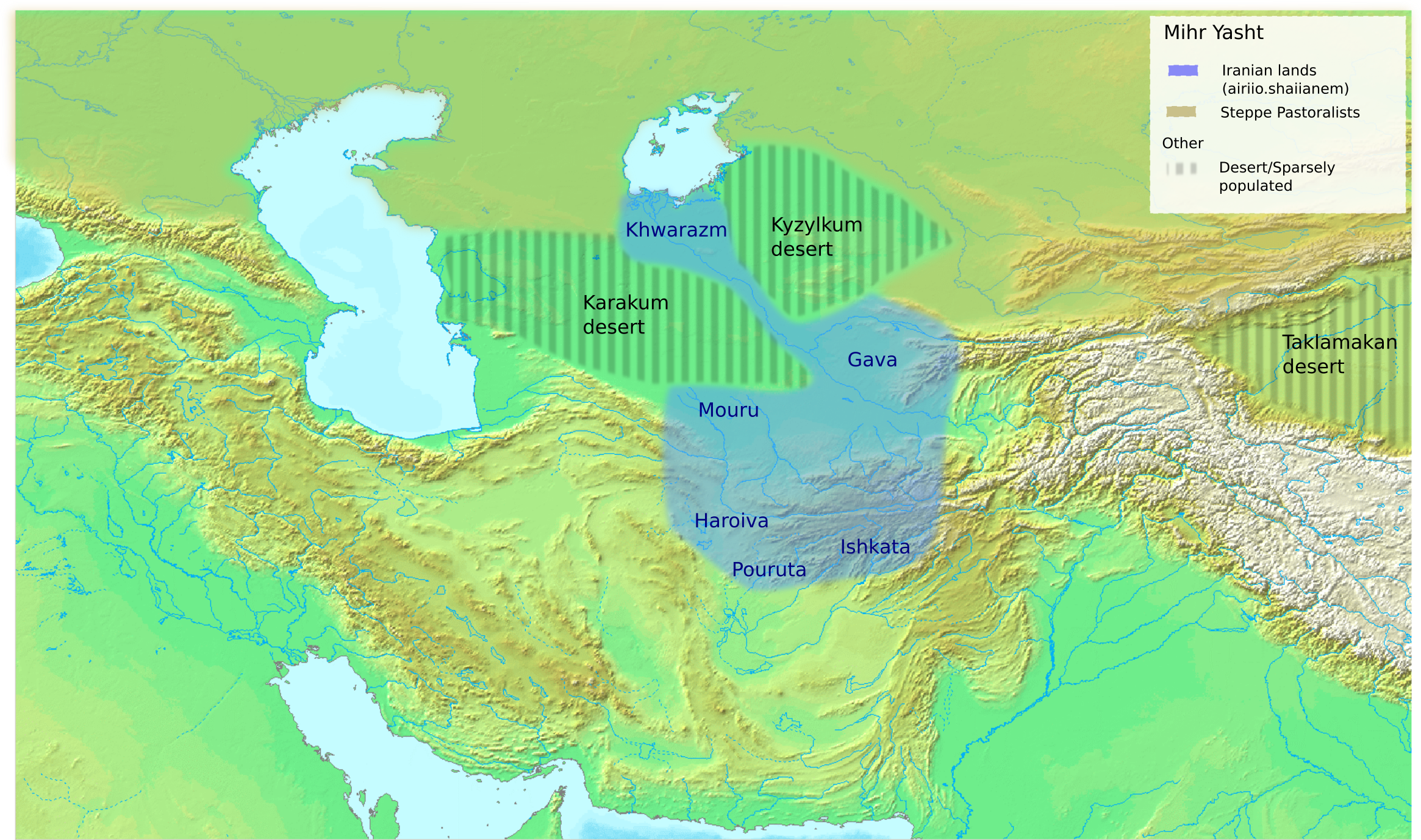
Approximate location of the place names that form the Airyoshayana, i.e., the lands inhabited by the people of the Avesta in the Mihr Yasht according to Ilya Gershevitch.

The people of the Avesta saw the world as divided into seven regions called Karshvar, arranged concentrically. The central continent, called xvaniraθa, was their home. This is expressed in the Mihr Yasht (hymn), as the divine being Mithra climbs the mythical Hara Berezaiti to survey the Airyoshayana and the seven regions or "climes" of the Karshvar (Yt. 10.12-16, 67). The mountain Hara Berezaiti occupied the center of the inhabited world; its peak was orbited by the Sun, the Moon and stars, and from it the mythical river Anahita flowed into a cosmic ocean called Vourukasha.

Contacts with civilizations of the Ancient Near East and later Ancient Greece would come to influence Iranians' changing worldview and geographical knowledge. The Sassanians (224 – 651 CE) often used a four-fold division of the Earth, inspired by the Greeks. An Avestan worldview persisted well into the Islamic period which followed the Sassanians, when Iranian scholars such as al-Biruni (973 – 1050) merged the science of a spherical Earth with the Avestan concept of the Karshvars.

== Epic tradition ==
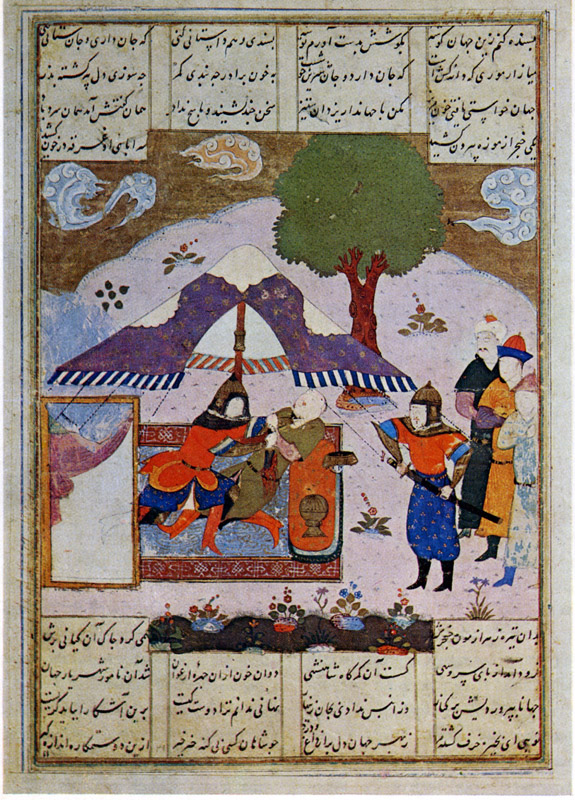
Illustration from the Shahnameh depicting the murder of Iraj by his brothers Sarm and Tur.

The Avesta contains numerous allusions to the poetry, mythology, stories and folklore of the early Iranians. The Aban Yasht, the Gosh Yasht, the Ram Yasht, the Den Yasht, and the Zamyad Yasht—together called the "legendary yashts"—in particular contain a large number of such allusions. The single largest source is the Bundahishn, a compendium of Zoroastrian cosmogony from the 8th or 9th century CE written in the Pahlavi script.

The long mythical history presented in the Avesta texts starts with the Pishdadian dynasty, followed by the Kayanian dynasty. The last of the Kayanians is Vishtaspa, an early convert to Zoroastrianism and an important patron of Zoroaster. Central to these stories is the conflict between the Iranians (Airiia) and their arch-enemies the Turanians (Turiia). The Turanian king Franrasyan and his attempts to steal the divine mystical power called Khvarenah feature in great detail.

Avestan characters like Yima, Thraetaona and Kavi Usan have counterparts in the Vedic Yama, Trita, and Kavya Ushanas, suggesting a common origin in the Indo-Iranian period. Some elements of the texts may contain historical information, such as the memory of kinship between the Iranian peoples expressed through three sons of Fereydun: Iraj (Airiia); Tur (Turiia); and Sarm (Sairima). Early scholarship generally accepted the historicity of the Kayanians; more recent opinions diverge.

Elements of these stories and characters recur in later texts detailing the Iranian national history Examples are the Bahman-nameh, the Borzu-nameh, the Darab-nameh, the Kush-nameh, and—most prominently—in the Iranian national epic the Shah-nameh. The influence of the Avestan period on Iranian literary tradition is substantial. Elton L. Daniel concluded that the Avestan period's "stories were so rich, detailed, coherent, and meaningful that they came to be accepted as records of actual events—so much so that they almost totally supplanted in collective memory the genuine history of ancient Iran."

== See also ==
- Avestan geography
- Vedic period, its Hindu counterpart
- Indo-Iranians
