= Yasht =

Zoroastrian religious term

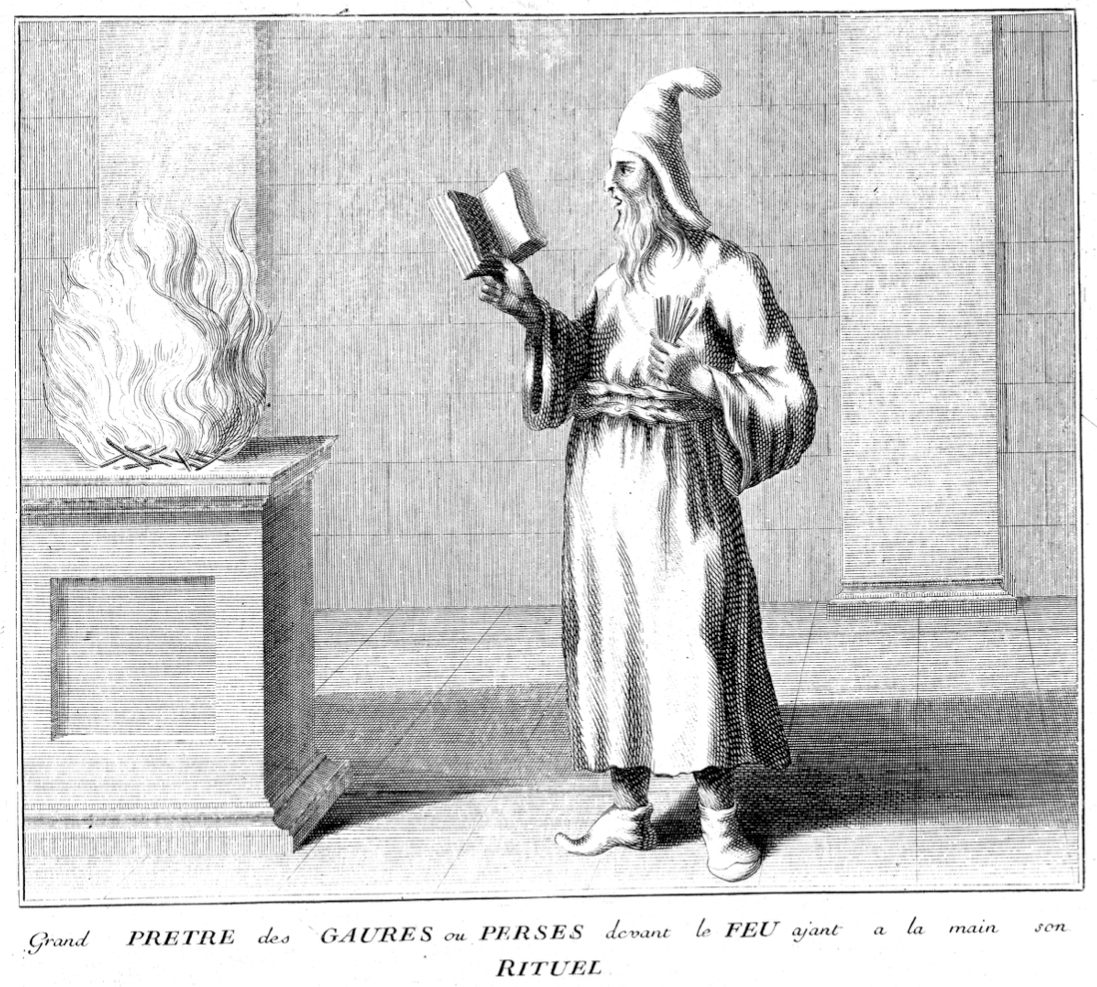
- Yasht is Middle Persian for worship.

Yasht (Middle Persian: 𐭩𐭱𐭲, yšt') is a Middle Persian term for sacrifice or worship. It commonly applies to the collection of 21 Yashts, although it may also refer to other texts within the wider Avesta collection.

== Etymology ==
The English word yasht is derived from Middle Persian 𐭩𐭱𐭲 (yšt', "prayer, worship"). It probably originated from Avestan 𐬫𐬀𐬱𐬙𐬀 (yašta, "honored") from 𐬫𐬀𐬰 (yaz, "to worship, honor") and may ultimately go back to Proto-Indo-European *yeh₂ǵ- or *Hyaǵ-. Avestan 𐬫𐬀𐬱𐬙𐬀 is also the origin of two other terms. First, Avestan 𐬫𐬀𐬯𐬥𐬀 (yasna, act of worship), which is a general Zoroastrian term for an act of worship or specifically the Yasna ritual, and, second, Avestan 𐬫𐬀𐬰𐬀𐬙𐬀 (yazata, (being) worthy of worship), which is a general Zoroastrian term for divinity.

== In Zoroastrian literature ==
In the Middle Persian Zoroastrian literature, yasht is a general term for a religious ceremony. It is used interchangeably with yasn, the Middle Persian version of Avestan yasna. Next to the Yashts (see below), the term is also used, for example for the Yasht i Visperad, the Dron Yasht or the Vishtasp Yasht. In addition, it appears in general terms like yasht-i keh (lesser ceremony) or yasht-i meh (greater ceremony).

== The 21 hymns of the Yasht collection ==
Nowadays, the term yasht most commonly applies to the Yashts, a collection of 21 hymns. All the hymns of the collection "are written in what appears to be prose, but which, for a large part, may originally have been a (basically) eight-syllable verse, oscillating between four and thirteen syllables, and most often between seven and nine." Most of the yazatas that the individual yashts praise, also have a dedication in the Zoroastrian calendar. The exceptions are Drvaspa and Vanant.

The 21 Yashts are used today in a wide range of liturgical practices. The can be recited by priests as well as lay people and in a diverse range of settings, like fire temples as well as in private or public spaces. They are typically addressed to one specific divinity. Their liturgical use is, therefore, different from the high liturgies, like the Yasna, or Yasht i Visperad, which are always performed by several priests, typically in a fire temple, and are dedicated to all Zoroastrian divinities.

== Yashts in the wider Avesta ==
In addition to the hymns in the Yashts collection, the term yasht is also used in Zoroastrian tradition for other texts. This includes several hymns of the Long Liturgy that "venerate by praise". These yashts are: the Barsom Yasht (Yasna 2), another Hom Yasht in Yasna 9–11, the Bhagan Yasht of Yasna 19–21, a hymn to Ashi in Yasna 52, another Srosh Yasht in Yasna 57, the praise of the (hypostasis of) "prayer" in Yasna 58, and a hymn to the Ahurani in Yasna 68.
