= Manthra (Zoroastrianism) =

Sacred utterance or prayer used in Zoroastrianism

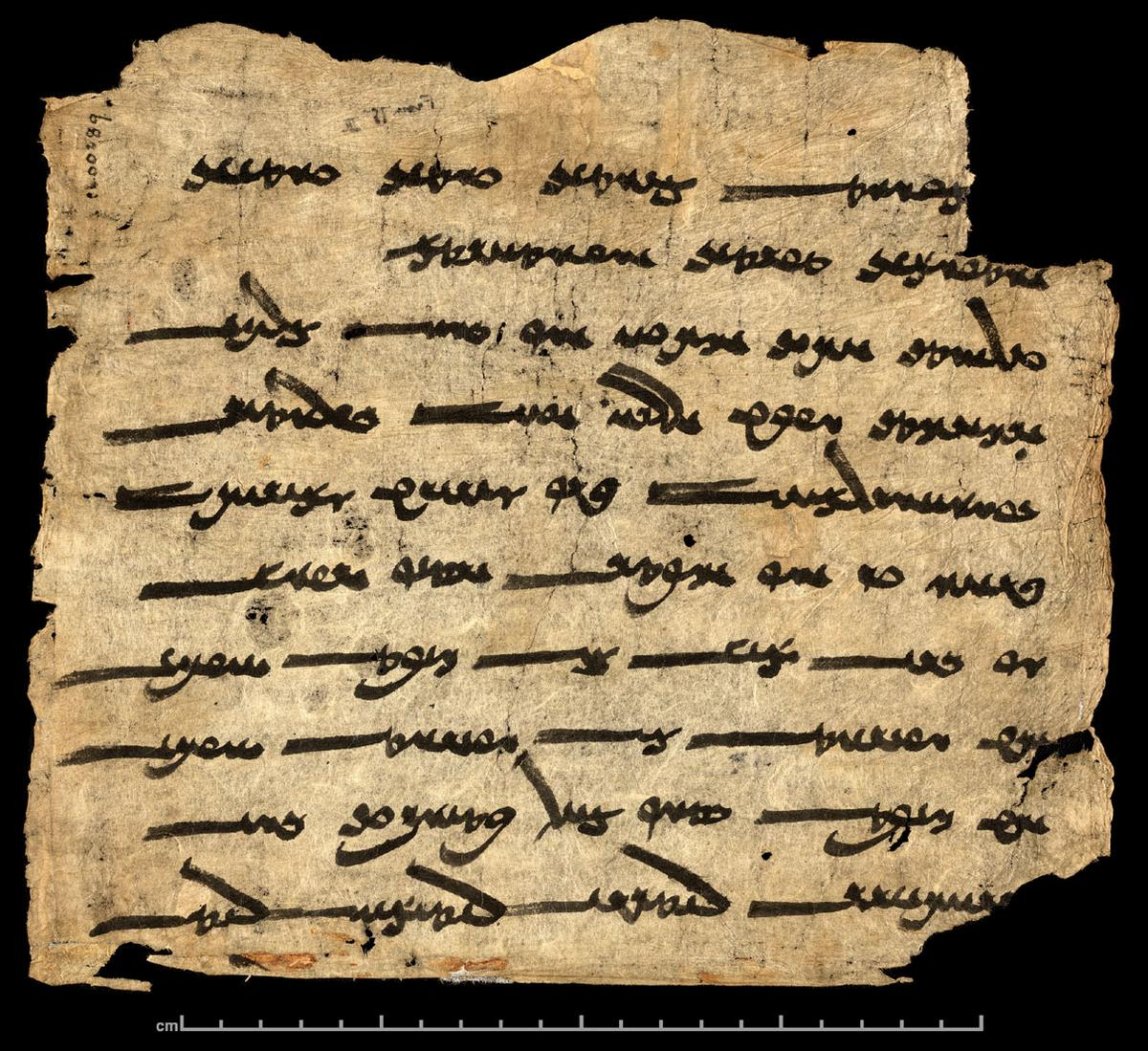
- Dunhuang manuscript from the 9th century CE, containing a Sogdian version of the Ashem vohu manthra

Information
- Religion: Zoroastrianism
- Language: Avestan

A manthra, mantra (Avestan: 𐬨𐬄𐬚𐬭𐬀, mąθra) or mansr (mʾnsl) is a prayer, sacred formula or inspired utterance considered in Zoroastrianism to have spiritual power. Their use already goes back to Zarathustra who described himself in his Gathas as a knower of manthras.

Zoroastrian manthras are etymologically and functionally related to the mantras known from the Indian tradition. However, they are not derived from Vedic mantras, but represent an independent, parallel development.

== Name ==
Avestan manthra appears in the Avesta as 𐬨𐬄𐬚𐬭𐬀 (mąθra), whereas in the Middle Persian literature, it is written mʾnsl A close cognate is known from the Old Indic Vedas as मन्त्र (mántra). This means that the term goes back to a common, Proto-Indo-Iranian *mantram, which in turn is derived from the reconstructed Proto-Indo-European verb *men (to think) and the instrumental suffix *-trom. By combining verb and suffix, the word *mantram, therefore, acquires the meaning instrument of thinking. (Note: An analogous noun would be Latin monstrum (bad omen, portent, monstrosity). It combines the verb 'moneō' (to warn) with the suffix '-trum' to create the meaning instrument of warning.)

Within the context of Zoroastrianism, the Avestan term is commonly transliterated into Latin script as manthra or mantra, while some use the phonetic transliteration mąθra. Yet this is not universally applied, and others translate Avestan mąθra using generic terms like holy spell, religious utterance or formula.

== Usage ==
In the Zoroastrian tradition, a manthra is a usually shorter, inspired utterance recited during religious rituals such as prayers. They can be distinguished from the longer, commonly eight-syllabic hymns of praise (called Yasht in the Avesta) as well as the typically eleven-syllabic songs (called Gathas in the Avesta as well as in the Vedas). The use of manthras in Zoroastrianism goes back to Zarathustra, who describes in the Gathas (Y. 50.5-50.6) his function as a prophet of Ahura Mazda explicitly as a knower of manthras (Avestan: mąθran; Sanskrit: mántrin).

The Avesta connects manthras with a wide range of positive qualities. For instance, in the Warharan Yasht, they are praised as "awful and powerful, awful and assembly-ruling, awful and victorious, awful and healing" (Yt. 14. 46). The most praise is reserved for the Ahuna vairya, the Ashem vohu, the Yenghe hatam, and the Airyaman ishya, which are considered the most important manthras in Zoroastrianism. Zoroastrian tradition considers the potency of a manthra to be dependent on their correct recitation. As a result, they have survived largely intact to this day, although for a long time their transmission was exclusively oral.

In the later Avestan texts, manthras sometimes became personified through the Zoroastrian divinity of Manthra Spenta (Avestan: 𐬨𐬄𐬚𐬭𐬀 𐬯𐬞𐬆𐬧𐬙𐬀, mąθra spəṇta), the manthra (which is) holy/bounteous/furthering. The Avesta describes Manthra Spenta as emanating directly from Ahura Mazda and returning to him through the manthras spoken by priests and poets. In the Zoroastrian calendar, the 29th day of the month is dedicated to this divinity.

== Comparison to Vedic Mantras ==
The use of manthras in Zoroastrianism represents a parallel development to the Vedic mantra tradition and must, therefore, go back to the common Indo-Iranian period when the people of the Avesta and the people of the Vedas formed a single people. Investigating their commonalities is therefore important to understand the poetic and religious traditions of the early Indo-Iranians. These similarities are found in the social, economic and religious sphere of the Avestan and Vedic people.

Such similarities are found for example in fixed expression like 'true mantra' (Avestan: haiθiia mąθra; Sanskrit: satyá mántra) or 'to fashion the mantra' (Avestan: mąθrəm taš; Sanskrit: mántram takṣ). Moreover, both the Vedic and Avestan mantras show a number of functional similarities. One is the notion that if truth is properly expressed in the mantra, it can compel a divinity to comply with the speaker's request. Another similarity is the Vedic and Avestan connection of mantras to paths, such that a properly articulated mantra may open a path to the divinity that is addressed. Moreover, both traditions consider the mantras to be fashioned from the heart since this was considered to be the seat of thought. Mantras during the Proto-Indo-Iranian period may, therefore, have represented the power of speech in "creating, conveying, concentrating and realizing intentional and efficient thought [to] identifying oneself with the essence of the divinity[.]"

== See also ==
- Mantra
- Jesus Prayer
