= Niels Ludvig Westergaard =

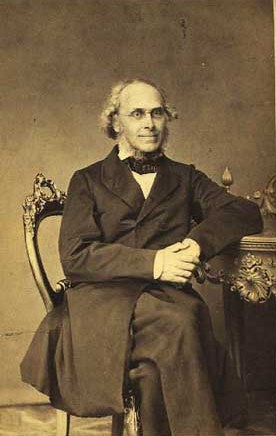
Niels Ludvig Westergaard (1815-1878)

Niels Ludvig Westergaard (27 October 1815 – 9 September 1878) was a Danish Orientalist and professor.

== Biography ==
Westergaard was born in Copenhagen, Denmark. In 1833, he became a student at Borgerdivskolen in Copenhagen. Westergaard studied Old Norse as well as Sanskrit and continuing his studies at the University of Bonn (1838 with Christian Lassen 1800–1876), and also in London, Paris and Oxford. After returning to Denmark, he published "Radices linguae sanscritae". From 1841 to 1844 he journeyed throughout India and Persia, where he conducted important investigations in Bombay and at Persepolis. In 1844 he began deciphering ancient Elamite cuneiform using the 3-way parallel text of the 6th cent. BC Behistun Inscription, finding 96 syllabic signs, 16 ideograms, and 5 determinants.

In 1845 he was appointed professor of Indo-Oriental philology at the University of Copenhagen. From 1867-68 he was rector of the University.

Westergaard was married in 1845 to Christiane Frederikke Orpheline Octava Ryge (1819-1856). He was the father of economist Harald Westergaard (1853-1936).

== Written works ==
- "On The Deciphering Of the Second Achñmenian Or Median Species Of Arrowheaded Writing" (1840).
- Radices linguae Sanscritae ad decreta grammaticorum definivit atque copia exemplorum exquisitiorum illustravit (1841).
- Orientales bibliothecae Regiae Havniensis jussu et auspiciis Regis Daniae Augustissimi Christiani VIII. enumerati et descripti (1846).
- Kortfattet Sanskrit Formlaere (1846).
- Sagan af Hrafnkeli Freysgoòa (Kopenhagen, 1847).
- Bundehesh, liber Pehlvicus (Gyldendal, 1851).
- Inscriptiones duœ Regis Saporis primi, prope a vico Hâjiâbâd incisœ (Kopenhagen, 1851).
- Beitrag zur altiranischen Mythologie: Contribution to the ancient Iranian mythology (from the Danish translated by Friedrich Spiegel, Berlin, 1855).
- Om de ældste Tidsrum i den indiske Historie med Hensyn til Literaturen (Kopenhagen, 1860).
- Ueber den ältesten Zeitraum der Indischen Geschichte mit Rücksicht auf die Litteratur. (Breslau, 1862)
- Über Buddhas Todesjahr (1862).
- "Zendavesta or the religious books of the Zoroastrians".
- "The Zend texts".
- Bidrag til de indiske Lande Málavas og Kanyakubjas Historie 1868.
