= Karl Friedrich Geldner =

German orientalist (1852–1929)

- Born: 17 December 1852; Saalfeld, Saxe-Meiningen
- Died: 5 February 1929 (aged 76); Marburg, Hesse-Nassau
- Occupations: Linguist, translator

Karl Friedrich Geldner (17 December 1852 – 5 February 1929) was a German linguist best known for his analysis and synthesis of Avestan and Vedic Sanskrit texts.

== Biography ==
Geldner was born in Saalfeld, Saxe-Meiningen, where his father was a Protestant clergyman.

Geldner studied Sanskrit and Avestan at the University of Leipzig in 1871 before moving to the University of Tübingen in 1872. He received a doctorate in Indological studies in 1875, and became a privatdozent following his habilitation in 1876. In 1887, Gelder moved back to the north-east, this time to Halle, where he was appointed extraordinary professor in 1890, followed by an extraordinary faculty-chairmanship at the University of Berlin a few months later.

Geldner lectured in Berlin for 17 years. In 1907, he moved to the University of Marburg where he had been appointed ordinary professor. He retired from active teaching in 1921, and remained in Marburg until his death in 1929.

== Academic achievements ==
Geldner's first significant publication, though made public only in 1877, was written while he was still a doctoral student. The essay, which was in its expanded and published form titled Über die Metrik des jüngeren Avesta ("On the meter of the Younger Avesta"), was originally an answer to a prize essay question posed by the University of Tübingen's Faculty of Philosophy. His analysis revealed that although the texts had not retained a metrical form, the majority of the manuscripts were in 8 syllable verse (10 or 12 syllable lines also occurred).

Although the theory was subsequently revised by others, Geldner's hypothesis was reinstated in 1983, and the lines of the Younger Avesta are today considered to be historically related to the Vedic meters of the gayatri family. Unlike the meters of the Gathas, which are recited, the meters of the Younger Avesta are mostly sung.

Although Geldner would have preferred to research the Vedas (he would later state to have "lost" 15 years working on the Avesta), following the publication of his doctoral thesis, Geldner began to work on a revision of Westergaard's edition of the Avesta. What he initially assumed would occupy him for only a few years, eventually took 20 and it was not until 1886 that the first volume was published. That first volume (the Yasna) was followed by the Visperad and Khordeh Avesta in volume 2 (1889) and the Vendidad and Prolegomena in volume 3 (1895). Altogether, Geldner collated and documented over 120 manuscripts, and the greatest achievement of this laborious undertaking was "undoubtedly the Prolegomena, which provided an exact description of all manuscripts and their genealogical relationship" (so Schlerath, see references below).

Although Gelder published several Avesta-related articles while working on the revision, following the publication of volume 3 he returned to work almost exclusively on Sanskrit texts. Only two publications after 1895 deal with Avestan topics. Together with Richard Pischel he began to work on the Vedas, and their collaboration was subsequently published in the three volume Vedische Studien (Stuttgart: Kohlhammer Verlag, 1889–1901), which - unlike previous translations - avoided a purely linguistic methodology and instead took indigenous tradition into account. Following his return to Marburg in 1907, Geldner dedicated his efforts to a translation of the RigVeda, which was sent to his publisher in 1928 but did not reach the public until after the author's death in February 1929. The three volumes of his monumental Der Rig-Veda aus dem Sanskrit ins Deutsche übersetzt were finally released in 1951.

== Select bibliography ==
- Metrik des jüngeren Avesta, Tübingen, 1877
- Studien zum Avesta, Strassburg, 1882
- Drei Yasht aus dem Zendavesta Übersetzt und erklärt, Stuttgart, 1884
- Avesta - Die heiligen Bücher der Parsen (3 vols.), Stuttgart, 1885–1895
  Avesta, the Sacred Books of the Parsis (3 vols.), Stuttgart, 1896, 1891 and 1896
- 70 Lieder des Rigveda übersetzt, together with Rudolph von Roth und Adolf Kägi, Tübingen, 1875
- Vedische Studien, together mit Richard Pischel (3 vols.), Stuttgart, 1889–1901
- Avestaliteratur, in: Grundriss der iranischen Philologie, ed. Kuhn and Geiger, Tübingen, 1904
- Der Rigveda in Auswahl (2 vols.), Stuttgart, 1907–1909
- Die indische Balladendichtung, Marburg, 1913
- Die zoroastrische Religion (Das Avesta), Tübingen, 1926
- Vedismus und Brahmanismus, Tübingen
- Der Rig-Veda aus dem Sanskrit ins Deutsche übersetzt (3 vols.), London and Wiesbaden, 1951
  Corrections and addendum (Namen- u. Sachregister zur Übersetzung, dazu Nachträge und Verbesserungen / Aus dem Nachlass des Übersetzers) by Johannes Nobel, Cambridge, 1957
