= Sih-rozag =

Zoroastrian religious text

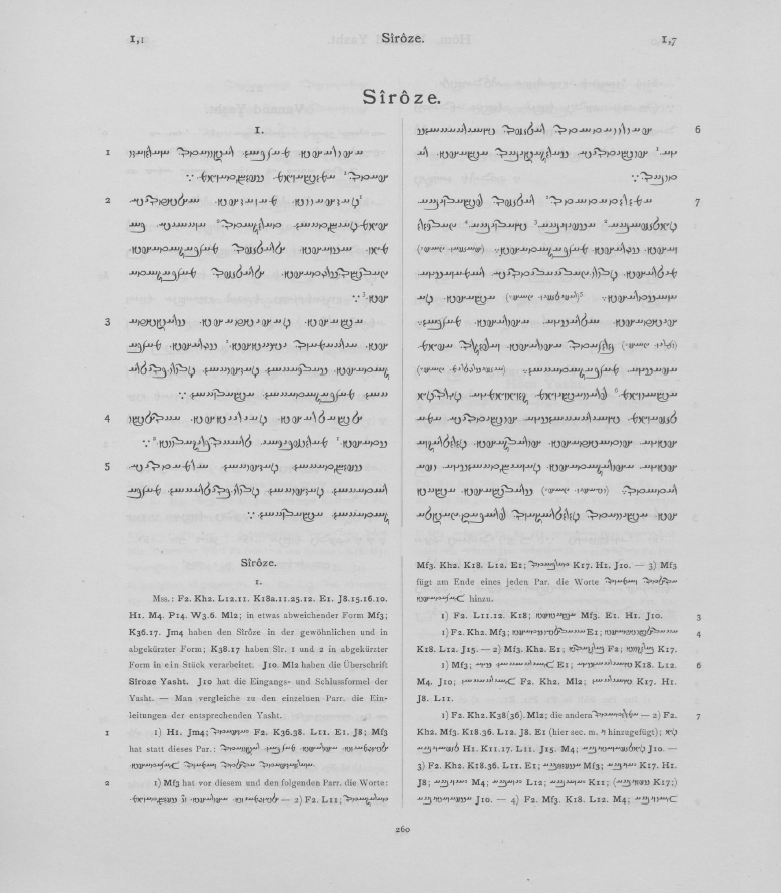
- First page of the Sih-rozag in Geldner's edition

Information
- Religion: Zoroastrianism
- Language: Avestan
- Chapters: 30

The Sih-rozag also known as Siroze are two closely related collections of short Avestan invocations and prayers dedicated to a number of Zoroastrian divinities, which in turn are connected to the thirty days in the Zoroastrian calendar.

== Name ==
Sih-rozag is derived from Middle Persian sīh, with the meaning thirty, and rōz, with the meaning days. It is, therefore, translated as thirty days or belonging to the thirty days. There is, however, no consensus on what thirty days are referenced here. On the one hand, authors like Darmesteter have interpreted them as the thirty days of the month in the Zoroastrian calendar to which the Sih-rozag is connected. On the other hand, it has been suggested that the name refers to the thirty-day long morning period for a deceased, during which the text is used.

== History ==
The origin of the Sih-rozag collection is unknown, but its strong connection with the Zoroastrian calendar suggests that it was put together after its creation, which happened in the 5th century BCE. during the Achaemenid period. The oldest mention of it is found in the Nerangestan dating to the Sasanian period. There are two version of the Sih-rozag, a short one and a long one. The former is called the Little Sih-rozag and the latter the Great Sih-rozag. Based on its grammatical structure, Raffaelli has speculated that the invocations of the Little Sih-rozag may originally have been part of other litanies, whereas the texts within the Great Sih-rozag were independent compositions.

In the extant manuscripts, the Sih-rozag is edited as part of the Khordeh Avesta, meaning its texts can be performed as prayers by both priest and lay people. In those manuscripts, the Avestan text of the Sih-rozag is presented jointly with a lengthy commentary in Middle Persian. In modern practice, the Sih-rozag is used in various rituals like the Afrinagan prayers, the Yasna, the Dron Yasht and during funerary rites.

== Structure and content ==
Overall, the content and structure of the two versions of the Sih-rozag is very similar, with invocations in the Great Sih-rozag being generally a somewhat more elaborate version of the same invocation in the Little Sih-rozag. In addition, the Little Sih-rozag addresses the divinites using a genitive construction, whereas in the Great Sih-rozag the accussative case is used, govered by the verb yazamaide (we sacrifize). For example, the prayer dedicated to the Waters, invoked on the 10th day, reads as follows in both versions:

To the good Waters, made by Mazda;
to the holy water-spring Ardvi Anahita;
to all waters made by Mazda;
to all plants made by Mazda.

— James Darmesteter
Little Sih-rozag 1.10
Translation:

We sacrifice unto the good Waters, made by Mazda and holy;
we sacrifice unto the holy waterspring Ardvi Anahita;
we sacrifice unto all waters, made by Mazda and holy;
we sacrifice unto all plants, made by Mazda and holy.

— James Darmesteter
Great Sih-rozag 2.10

There is some confusion as to the number of prayers, which comprise the collection. Most modern editions of the Sih-rozag divide it according to the 30 days of the Zoroastrian month and, as a result, the Sih-rozag consists of 30 prayers in these editions. In other editions, however, the last prayer, i.e., the 30th section, dedicated to Anagran in the above editions, is split into four distinct prayers dedicated to Anagran, Apam Napat, Haoma and Dahma Afriti. This division, therefore, results in 33 distinct prayers:

30: To the eternal and sovereign luminous space;
to the bright Garō-māna;
to the sovereign place of eternal Weal;
to the Kinvat Bridge, made by Mazda;
to the tall lord Apam Napat and to the water made by Mazda;
to Haoma, of holy birth;
to the pious and good Blessing;
to the awful cursing thought of the wise;
to all the holy Gods of the heavenly world and of the material one;
to the awful, overpowering Fravashis of the faithful,
to the Fravashis of the first men of the law,
to the Fravashis of the next-of-kin;
to every God invoked by his own name.

— James Darmesteter
Little Sih-rozag 1.30
Translation:

30: Of the Endless Lights, autonomous;
of the radiant Garo.nmana;
of the Misuuan Gatu, autonomous;
of the Cinuuat.peretu, created by Mazda;
31: of the high lord Apam napat, and of water, created by Mazda;
32: of Haoma, vehicle of Order;
33: of the good Dahma Afriti;
of the strong Damoiš Upamana;
of all the holy spiritual and material yazatas;
of the strong, unswerving frauuašis of the righteous;
of the frauuašis of the first believers;
of the frauuašis of the next of kin;
of the yazata whose name is pronounced.

— Enrico G. Raffaelli
Little Sih-rozag 1.30-33

Regardless of the division, the first 30 prayers are each dedicated to a Zoroastrian divinity with their own name day. This means, that they are invoked on the day of the month, which is named after and dedicated to this divinity. The only exception is Ahura Mazda which is invoked on every eighth day, i.e., day 1, 8, 15 and 23. As a result, there are 27 divinities with their own name day in the Zoroastrian calendar.

== Connection to the Yasht collection ==
The Sih-rozag has a strong connection to the collection of 21 Yashts. Like the former, the latter have an established relationship with the day names of the Zoroastrian calendars and the respective divinities celebrated on that day. In addition, both the introductory and concluding verses of each yasht draw material from the Sih-rozag.

Overview of the 30 Sih-rozag and the corresponding 21 Yashts
Sih-rozag				Yashts collection		
No	Avestan	Middle Persian	English	No	Name	Yazata
1	Ahura Mazda	Ohrmazd	Lord Wisdom	1	Ohrmazd Yasht	Ahura Mazda
2	Vohu Manah	Bahman	Good Thought	2	Hapt Amahraspand	Amesha Spentas
3	Asha Vahishta	Ardibehest	Best Truth	3	Ardwahisht Yasht	Asha Vahishta
4	Kshatra Vairya	Shahrevar	Desirable Dominion	2	Hapt Amahraspand	Amesha Spentas
5	Spenta Armaiti	Spendarmad	Right-mindedness	2	Hapt Amahraspand	Amesha Spentas
6	Haurvatat	Khordad	Wholeness	4	Hordad Yasht	Haurvatat
7	Ameretat	Murdad	Immortality	2	Hapt Amahraspand	Amesha Spentas
8	Daduuah Ahura Mazda	Dai pa Adar		1	Ohrmazd Yasht	Ahura Mazda
9	Atar	Adar	Fire			
10	Ab	Aban	Water	5	Aban Yasht	Anahita
11	Hvare-khshaeta	Khorshed	Sun	6	Xwarshed Yasht	Hvare-khshaeta
12	Maonghah	Mah	Moon	7	Mah Yasht	Maonghah
13	Tishtrya	Tir	Sirius	8	Tishtar Yasht	Tishtrya
14	Gosh Urvaan	Gosh	Soul of the Cow	9	Gosh Yasht	Drvaspa
15	Daduuah Ahura Mazda	Dai pa Mihir		1	Ohrmazd Yasht	Ahura Mazda
16	Mithra	Mihir	Contract	10	Mihr Yasht	Mithra
17	Sraosha	Srosh	Attentiveness	11	Srosh Yasht	Sraosha
18	Rashnu	Rashn	Justice	12	Rashn Yasht	Rashnu
19	Fravashis	Frawardin	Choices	13	Frawardin Yasht	Fravashis
20	Verethragna	Bahram	Victory	14	Bahram Yasht	Verethragna
21	Raman	Ram	Peace	15	Ram Yasht	Vayu
22	Vata	Bad	Wind			
23	Daduuah Ahura Mazda	Dai pa Din		1	Ohrmazd Yasht	Ahura Mazda
24	Daena	Den	Religion	16	Den Yasht	Chista
25	Ashi	Ard	Reward	17	Ard Yasht	Ashi
26	Arshtat	Ashtad	Rectitude	18	Ashtad Yasht	Khvarenah
27	Asman	Asman	Sky			
28	Zam	Zamyad	Earth	19	Zamyad Yasht	Khvarenah
29	Manthra Spenta	Mahraspand	Holy Mantra	20	Hom Yasht	Haoma
30	Anagra Raocah	Anagran	Endless Light	21	Vanand Yasht	Vanant

As can be seen from the table, the relationship between the Sih-rozag and the Yashts is both obvious and imperfect. Overall, there are three main differences. First, there are several days dedicated to Ahura Mazda, but only one yasht is dedicated to him. Second, the Amesha Spentas have collectivley only one yasht but a number of days are dedicated to them individually. Finally, a number of days do not have a yasht at all or are represented by yashts dedicated to other divinities.

The reasons for this discrepancy are unknown. On the one hand, it is possible that the Yasht collection originally also consisted of thirty hymns and some got lost over time. On the other hand, the hymns in the Yasht collection may originally have served other purposes and were only later expanded and imperfectly associated with the days of the Zoroastrian calendar.

== Scholarly editions and translations ==
The Sih-rozag has typically been edited and translated as part of the wider Avesta collection. The first scholarly translation of the Sih-rozag was published in 1771 by Anquetil-Duperron into French. The first critical edition, based on ten manuscripts, was published in 1852 as part of Westergaard's edition. In 1889, Geldner produced another critical edition, based on 24 manuscripts, which remains the standard work as of today. In 1883, Darmesteter published the first translation of the Sih-rozag into English and in 1892 a translation into French. In 2014, Raffaelli published the first critical edition dedicated to the Sih-rozag alone. It contains both its Avestan text and its Middle Persian commentary along with a translation into English, a commentary and a critical apparatus.
