= Hordad Yasht =

Zoroastrian religious hymn

- ← Ardwahisht Yasht Aban Yasht →
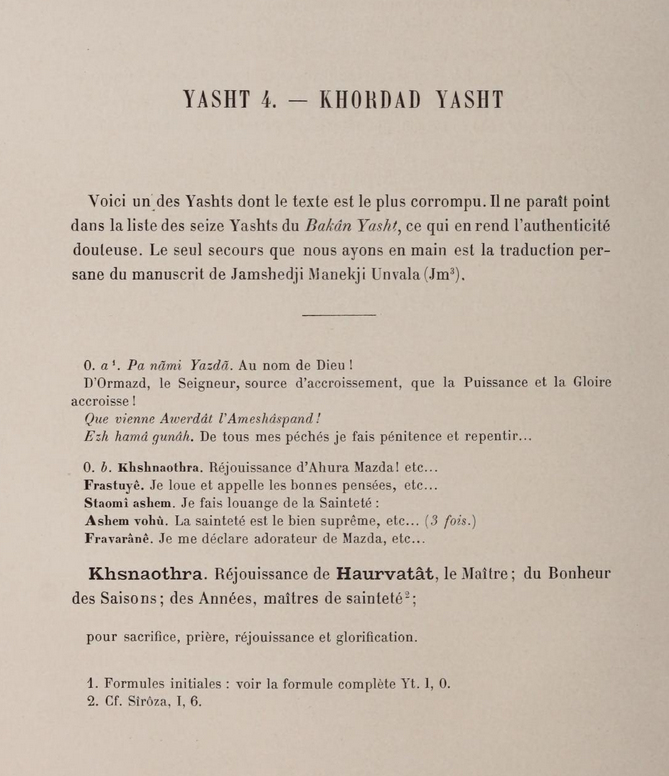
- First page of the Hordad Yasht in Darmesteter's French translation

Information
- Religion: Zoroastrianism
- Language: Avestan
- Period: Avestan period
- Verses: 11

The Hordad Yasht, also known as Khordad Yasht, or Awerdad Yasht, is the fourth hymn of the 21 Yashts. It is named after and dedicated to Haurvatat, the Zoroastrian divinity representing wholeness and perfection.

== Name ==
Hordad (hwrdt) is a Middle Persian term with the meaning perfection. It is also the name of the 3rd month and the 6th day of each month in the Zoroastrian calendar. It is derived from Avestan Haurvatat, one of the Amesha Spentas associated with water. Hordad is also the origin of Modern Persian Khordad (Persian: خرداد), which is the name of the third month and 6th day of each month in the modern Persian calendar.

== Within the Yasht collection ==
Within the collection of 21 Yashts, the Hordad Yasht is the fourth hymn. It is typically celebrated on the 6th day of the month in the Zoroastrian calendar. Jointly with Yasht 2, 3, 20 and 21, it is one of the few hymns which is not derived from the Bagan yasht. However, unlike those yashts but like most others, it does not have a translation into Middle Persian. It is considered to be of inferior quality and to be a late composition. As a result, the Hordad Yasht is counted among the so-called Minor Yashts.

== Structure and content ==
The Hordad Yasht consists of 11 stanzas, which makes it one of the shorter yashts. It also lacks the division into kardas and the frashna formula, both of which are otherwise common for the yasht genre. According to Darmesteter, only the first two stanzas are dedicated to Haurvatat, to which it is nominally dedicated, whereas the remaining part refers to the Barashnûm ceremony. Pananio argued that the Hordad Yasht may originally have belonged to an ancient ritual. Hintze has observed a connection of the Hordad Yasht with the Vendidad.

== History ==
According to later references in the Zoroastrian literature, the Hordad Yasht was not part of Bagan yasht, where most of the extant yashts had been collected by Zoroastrian priests. The oldest extant manuscript which contains the Hordad Yasht is the F1 manuscript (ms. 6550) written in 1591 by Asdin Kaka Dhanpal Laxmidar, a Zoroastrian priest from the Homajiar Ramyar family in Navsari. It is unknown from which source the Hordad Yasht was drawn. Its corrupt Avestan text indicates that it was compiled from earlier Avestan texts after Avestan ceased to be a spoken language. Swennen argued that this compilation must have been taken place during the Sasanian Empire, whereas Panaino argues that it could have happened later.

== Editions and translations ==
The text of the Hordad Yasht is extant through a number of different manuscripts, all of which trace back to the F1 and E1 manuscripts. There is no edition dedicated to this hymn specifically, but its text has been made available through critical editions of the whole Avestan corpus. Examples are the editions by Westergaard, Spiegel and Geldner. Translations into western languages were made by Darmesteter in 1883 into English and in 1892 into French, while Lommel published a translation into German in 1927.
