= Srosh Yasht Hadoxt =

Zoroastrian religious hymn

- ← Mihr Yasht Rashn Yasht →
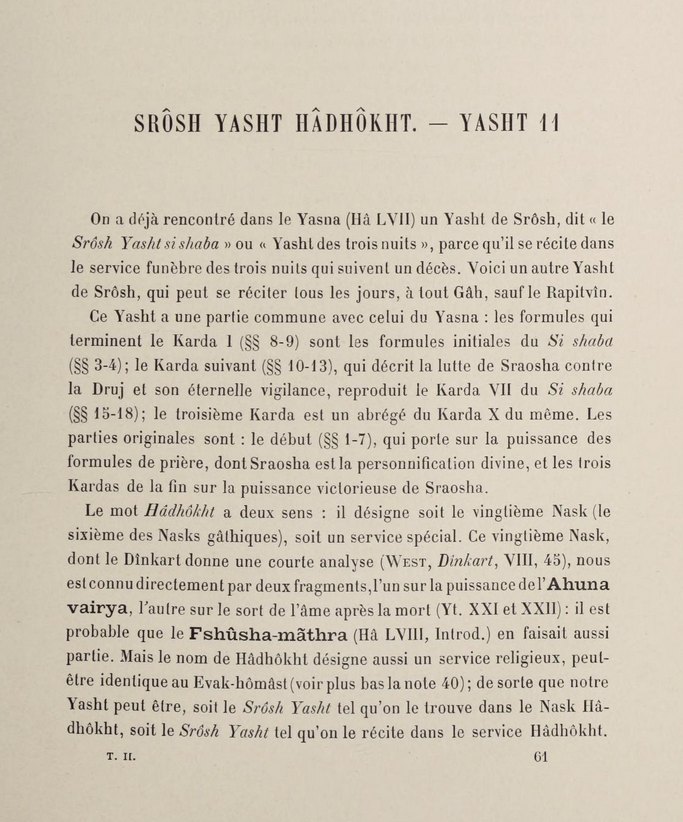
- First page of the Srosh Yasht Hadoxt in Darmesteter's French translation

Information
- Religion: Zoroastrianism
- Language: Avestan
- Period: Avestan period
- Chapters: 5 Kardes
- Verses: 22

The Srosh Yasht Hadoxt, also known as Srosh Yasht, is the 11th hymn in the Yashts. It is named after and dedicated to Sraosha, the Zoroastrian hypostasis of Obedience and Observance. It must not be confused with the Srosh Yasht se shabag, which is also called Srosh Yasht and also dedicated to the same divinity.

== Name ==
The Srosh Yasht Hadoxt is named after Sraosha, the Avestan name of the Zoroastrian divinity representing Obedience, whose name in Middle Persian became Srosh. It is also the name of the 17th day of the month in the Zoroastrian calendar. In the sources, this hymn is sometimes called Srosh Yasht or Srosh Yasht Hadoxt.

The origin of this hymn is unclear. According to the information provided in one of the oldest manuscripts, it is derived from the Hadoxt nask, one of the volumes of the now lost Sasanian Avesta. According to other sources, however, either the Srosh Yasht Hadoxt, or the Srosh Yasht se shabag, was part of Bagan yasht nask, where it may have formed its eighth chapter. Its name may also be derived from the Hadoxt ceremony, where it may once have been recited.

== Within the Yasht collection ==
Within the collection of 21 Yasht, the Srosh Yasht is the 11th hymn and with 22 verses, it is of average length. Next to Yasht 1, the Srosh Yasht Hadoxt is the only yasht with an old translation in Middle Persian. It shares a number of similarities with Yasht 8, Yasht 10, Yasht 12, Yasht 13 and Yasht 14, a group which is known as the Hymnic Yashts.

== Structure and content ==
Like many other yashts, the text of the Srosh Yasht Hadoxt is divided into chapters, kalled kardas. It does, however, not feature the frashna, i.e., the text is not framed as a consultation of Ahura Mazda by Zarathustra. Its content is dedicated to the praise of Sraosha. Most of the material is derived from the Srosh Yasht se shabag and it is generally regarded as derivative and comparatively inferior. Regardless, it is one of the most popular hymns.

== Ritual use ==
If the Srosh Yasht Hadoxt was indeed derived from the Bagan yasht nask, it may have been once part of the Bagan Yasn. This liturgy is no longer performed, but according to the information in the Nerangestan, this was a so-called intercalation ceremony. This means that its chapters would have been inserted into the Yasht i Visperad during the Staota Yasnya. In today's Zoroastrian practice, the hymn is celebrated on the 17th day of the month dedicated to Sraosha. The yasht can be performed at any time of the day except during Rapithwin.

== Editions and translations ==
There is no edition which is specifically dedicated to the Srosh Yasht. Instead, the hymn has been edited and translated as part of the wider Avesta or Yasht collection. It was included in both Westergaard's and Geldner's edition of the Avesta. Darmester provided a translation both into English and French, whereas Lommel provided a translation into German.
