= Ardwahisht Yasht =

Zoroastrian religious hymn

- ← Haft Amahraspand Yasht Hordad Yasht →
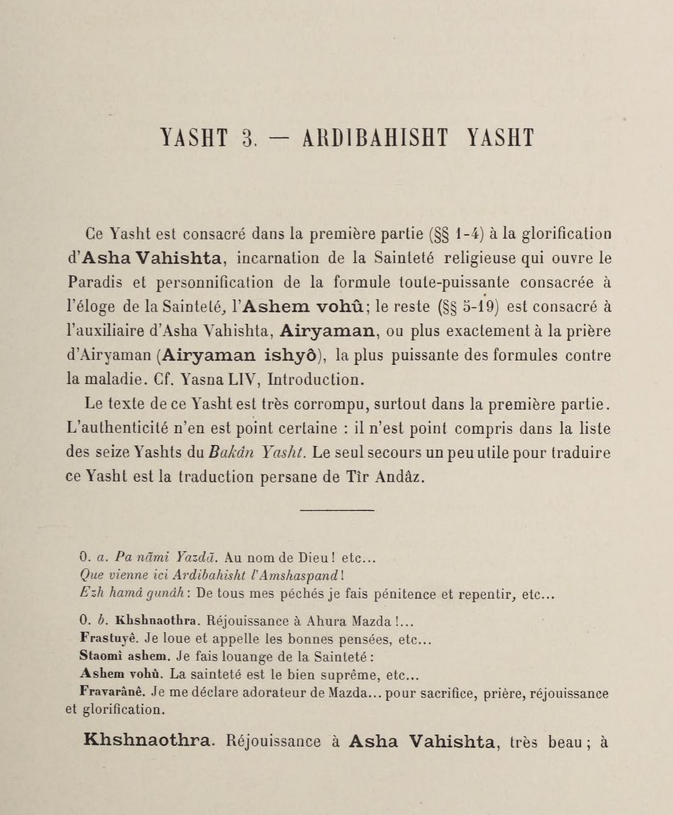
- First page of the Ardwahisht Yasht in Darmesteter's French translation

Information
- Religion: Zoroastrianism
- Language: Avestan
- Period: Avestan period
- Verses: 19

The Ardwahisht Yasht, also known as the Ordibehesht Yasht, is the third hymn of the 21 Yashts. It is named and dedicated to Asha Vahishta, the Amesha Spenta representing Asha.

== Name ==
Ardwahisht (rtwhšt) is the Middle Persian name of Asha Vahishta (Avestan: 𐬬𐬀𐬵𐬌𐬱𐬙𐬀 𐬀𐬴𐬀, The Best Asha), the Amesha Spenta and Yazata representing Asha. It is a compound term consisting of Ard, the Middle Persian name of Asha, and wahist, the Middle Persian word meaning The Best.

== Within the Yasht collection ==
Within the collection of 21 Yashts, the Ardwahisht Yasht is the third hymn. A number of factors set it apart from most of the other yashts. First, its Avestan text exhibits a number of errors and it appears to be stitched together from earlier sources. Next, it was not part of the Bagan yasht. Finally, it is considered to be a relatively late composition. As a result, it is counted among the so called Minor Yashts. Despite this, the Ardwahisht Yasht is a relatively popular hymn.

== Structure and content ==
The Ardwahisht Yasht consists of 19 stanzas. According to Darmesteter, they can be divided into two main parts. The first part consists of stanzas 1-4. This is the only part dedicated to Asha, the Zoroastrian divinity after which it is actually named. In addition, this part is dedicated to the Ashem Vohu manthra, the prayer in honor of Asha. The second and larger part consists of stanzas 5-19. It is dedicated to Airyaman, a Zoroastrian divinity with a strong connection to Asha, as well as to the Airyaman ishya manthra, the prayer dedicated to Airyaman.

== Editions ==
During the Sasanian Empire, a comprehensive edition of the Avestan corpus existed. Within this edition, most extant yashts were part of the Bagan yasht, one of the volumes of this edition. However, according to later descriptions, the Ardwahisht Yasht was not included and its provenience is unknown. After the loss of the Sasanian Avesta, sometime between the 10th and 14th century, the surviving Avestan texts were transmitted through a number of individual manuscript traditions. The oldest manuscript, which contains the Ardwahisht Yasht is the F1 manuscript (ms. 6550) written in 1591 by Asdin Kaka Dhanpal Laxmidar, a Zoroastrian priest from the Homajiar Ramyar family in Navsari.

There is no modern edition dedicated to this hymn specifically, but its text has been made available through critical editions of either the whole Avestan corpus or the yasht corpus specifically. One of the oldest editions was compiled by Westergaard in 1852. In 1863, Spiegel produced another edition of the Avesta, in which the Ardwahisht Yasht was published in Volume III, dedicated to the Khordeh Avesta and the yasht collection. In 1889, Geldner produced his seminal edition of the Avesta, which contains a critical apparatus of the manuscripts he used for editing and the textual variants contained therein.

== Translations ==
The Ardwahisht Yasht is one of the few yashts for which a translation into Middle Persian is available. This translation is, however, found in only 4 of the 22 manuscripts, namely the D 1810, MR 1844, U2 and U3 manuscripts. The translation shows similarities to the classic Zend commentaries of the Sasanian period. However, factors like the presences of an Arabic loan word as well as the influence of Modern Persian, demonstrate that it was produced some time after the Islamic conquest of Iran.

Translations into western languanges are based on the edition of Geldner and consequently translate either the whole Avesta or the yasht collection. The first translation into English was provided in 1883 by James Darmesteter as part of the Sacred Books of the East series by Max Müller. In 1892, Darmesteter also provided a translation into his native French. An important translation into German was produced by Lommel in 1927 as part of his seminal translation of the yasht collection.
