= Vishtasp Sast =

Zoroastrian religious text

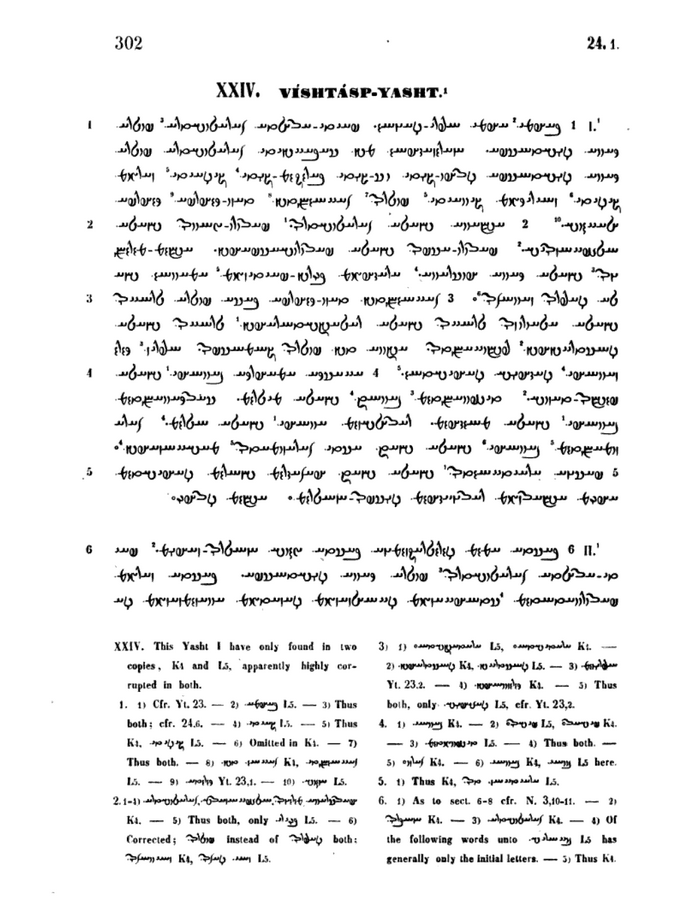
- First page of the Vishtasp Sast in Westergaard's edition (Note: In his edition, Westergaard uses the term Vishtasp Yasht for the text.)

Information
- Religion: Zoroastrianism
- Language: Avestan
- Chapters: 8

The Vishtasp Sast, also known as Vishtasp Yasht, is the name of an Avestan text, which is extant through a number of manuscripts and was once used in the Vishtasp Yasht ceremony. It is often seen as being derived from the Vishtasp-sast nask, one of the lost nasks, i.e., volumes, of the Sasanian Avesta.

== Name ==
The name of the text is used inconsistently in the sources. For instance in manuscript G18a, the term Vishtasp Sast (wštʾsp sʾt) is used for the text and Vishtasp Yasht (wštʾsp yšt) for the ceremony in which the text is used. However, in manuscript K4, both the text and the ceremony, are called Vishtasp Yasht. Cantera has argued that the former division should be considered the original one, whereas the fusion between both terms is the result of a later copying error.

In addition, different renderings of the Pahlavi wštʾsp sʾt are used by modern authors. Examples include Vishtāsp Sāst, Vishtasp-sasto and Wištāsp Sāst. The name itself has been interpreted as meaning "Instructions to Wishtasp" or "Instruction of Wishtasp".

== Manuscripts ==
The Vishtasp Sast is extant through two manuscript traditions, one in India and one in Iran. They have recently been analyzed by Jaime Martinez-Porro, who presented two different theories to explain the interdependencies between the different traditions. The Avestan Digital Archive has published the Pahlavi manuscript F12a_5310, and a number of Sade manuscripts, namely manuscripts G18a_5010, G120_5115, HM_5040, 5020 (K4), and 5102 (DY1).

== Structure and content ==
The text of the Vishtasp Sast is divided into eight chapters, called fragards. These fragards are used during the Vishtasp Yasht ceremony as insertions into the text of the Visperad ceremony. This is similar to the fragards of the Vendidad, which are likewise inserted into the Visperad ceremony during a performance of a Vendidad ceremony. Since the sections of the Visperad are called karde, the term fragard has consequently being interpreted as around a karde.

The content of the Vishtasp Sast is not always clear, due to the deteriorated Avestan of the text. On the other hand, the Middle Persian translation of the text, present in the Pahlavi manuscripts, has been considered to be rather faithful. The content of the text mostly consists of Zarathustra explaining a number of principles of the religion to Vishtaspa.

== Editions and translations ==
The Vishtasp Sast has been edited inconsistently by modern scholars. The first critical edition of the text was published in 1852 by Westergaard. However, Spiegel's edition as well Karl Friedrich Geldner's seminal edition of the Avesta, do not include it. A first translation into English was provided by Darmesteter in 1883. In this work, he calls the text Vishtasp Yasht and included it into the Yasht collection as the 24. Yasht. In 1892, he also published a translation into his native French.

== Connection to the Vishtasp-sast nask ==
It is traditionally believed that the text of the Vishtap Sast manuscripts originated, in whole or in parts, from the Vishtasp-sast nask, one of the volumes of the, now lost, Sasanian Avesta. For example, Edward William West observes how one of the information given about the lost Vishtasp-sast nask is that it consisted of eight sections, the same number as the fragards of the Vishtasp Sast. Likewise, Jean Kellens uses the name Vishtasp Yasht to label the Vishtasp-sast nask as the surviving parts of this nask. On the other hand, Marijan Mole was more sceptical about the connection, but stated that some parts of the Vishtasp Sast may have been taken from the lost Vishtasp-sast nask.
