= Gosh Yasht =

Zoroastrian religious hymn

- ← Tishtar Yasht Mihr Yasht →
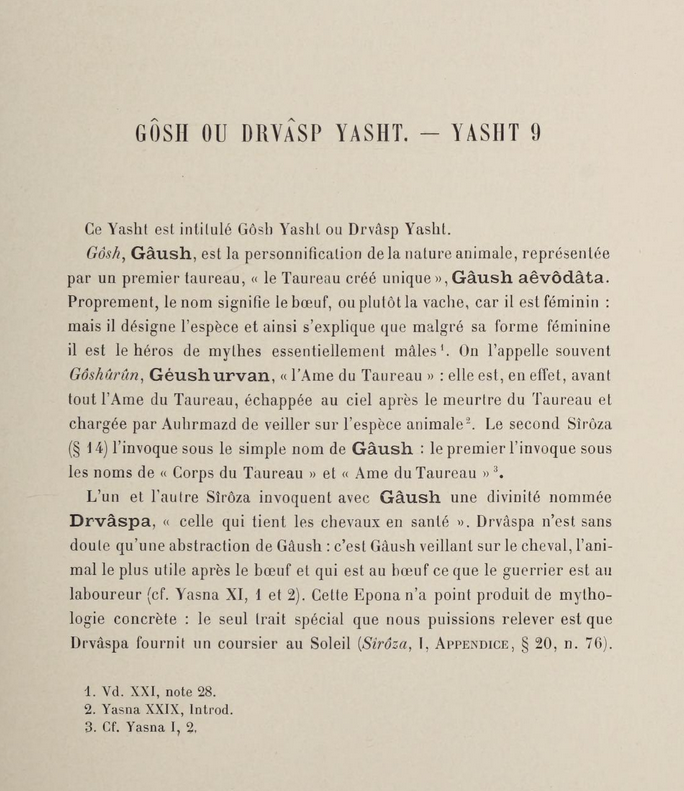
- First page of the Gosh Yasht in Darmesteter's French translation

Information
- Religion: Zoroastrianism
- Language: Avestan
- Period: Avestan period
- Chapters: 7 kardes
- Verses: 32

The Gosh Yasht also known as Drwasp Yasht is the ninth hymn of the 21 Yashts. It is named after the 14th day of the month in the Zoroastrian calendar, but its content is dedicated to the praise of Drvaspa, a Zoroastrian divinity associated with horses.

== Within the Yasht collection ==
Within the collection of 21 Yashts, the Gosh Yasht is the ninth hymn. It consists of 7 kardas, i.e., chapters, and 32 stanzas. It is classified as a Legendary Yasht because of the lengthy description of legendary figures worshipping Drvaspa. The yasht is celebrated on the 14th day of the month in the Zoroastrian calendar.

The written history of the Gosh Yasht probably began jointly with several other yashts by being part of the Bagan yasht, one of the volumes of the lost Sasanian Avesta. Descriptions in later works indicate that it may have formed its sixth chapter. The oldest manuscript containing the text of the Gosh Yasht is the F1 manuscript (ms. 6550) written in 1591 by Asdin Kaka Dhanpal Laxmidar of the Homajiar Ramyar family in Navsari. In this manuscript, it is already part of the 21 Yasht collection. Its text has been made avaiblable to modern scholarship by the editions of Westergaard and Geldner, whereas translations have been provided, e.g., by Darmesteter and Lommel.

== Name ==
In the extant manuscripts, the name of the yasht is used inconsistently. In some it appears under the Middle Persian name Gosh, i.e., the 14th day of the month in the Zoroastrian calendar. This day, on which the yasht is celebrated, is dedicated to Geush Uruuan, the soul of the primordial cow, as well as Geush Tashan, a divine Zoroastrian figure who created the cow. However, neither Geush Uruuan nor Geush Tashan appear in the yasht, which is instead dedicated to Drvaspa, a Zoroastrian divinity whose name means with solid horses. As a result, some of the manuscripts as well as some modern editions use the Middle Persian name Drwasp Yasht.

The reason for this inconsistent naming of the yasht remains unclear. Darmesteter has for example speculated that Drvaspa was an epithept of Geush Uruuan, i.e., it is the soul of the cow that watches over and protects horses. On the other hand, Malandra opines that the connection of the text with Geush Uruuan happened relatively late and was motivated by the content of the celebrations related to the 14th day in the calendar.

== Structure and content ==
The text of this yasht shows strong connections with Yasht 5 and Yasht 17, and it is generally assumed that the Gosh Yasht borrowed these elements. The first two stanzas of every karda, i.e., of every chapter, contain the only material unique to this yasht and the only one directly relating to Drvaspa. However, the text in these stanzas is regarded as defective. The yasht is therefore seen as a late compilation produced by redactors without an active command of Avestan. Each karda has the same structure, whereby the first karda reads as follows

We sacrifice unto the powerful Drvaspa, made by Mazda and holy, who keeps the flocks in health, the herds in health, the grown-up! (cattle) in health, the young ones in health; who watches well from afar, with a wide-spread and long-continued welfaregiving friendship;

Who yokes teams of horses, who makes her chariot turn and its wheels sound, fat and glistening, strong, tall-formed, weal-possessing, health-giving, powerful to stand and powerful to turn for assistance to the faithful.

To her did Haoshyangha, the Paradhata, offer up a sacrifice, upon the enclosure of the Hara, the beautiful height, made by Mazda, with a hundred male horses, a thousand oxen, and ten thousand lambs, and with an offering of libations:

Grant me this boon, O good, most beneficent Drvaspa! that I may overcome all the daévas of Mazana; that I may never fear and bow through terror before the daévas, but that all the daévas may fear and bow in spite of themselves before me, that they may fear and flee down to darkness

The powerful Drvaspa, made by Mazda, the holy Drvaspa, the maintainer, granted him that boon, as he was offering libations, giving gifts, sacrificing, and entreating that she would grant him that boon.

For her brightness and glory, I will offer her a sacrifice worth being heard; I will offer her a sacrifice well performed, namely, unto the powerful Drvaspa, made by Mazda and holy.

— Gosh Yasht karda I: verses 9.1 - 9.6 (translated by James Darmesteter).

The rest of the yasht, i.e. kardas II-VII, follows the same structure. The only variable element is the worshipper who addresses the goddes. Next to Haosyangha (karda I), these worshippers are Yima Khshaéta (karda II), Thraêtaona (karda III), Haoma (karda IV), Husravah (karda V), Zarathustra (karda VI) and Vishtaspa (karda VII). The exact same list of worshippers is also found in Yasht 17, where the worship is, however, addressed to Ashi instead of Drvaspa.
