= Vanand Yasht =

Zoroastrian religious hymn

- ← Hom Yasht
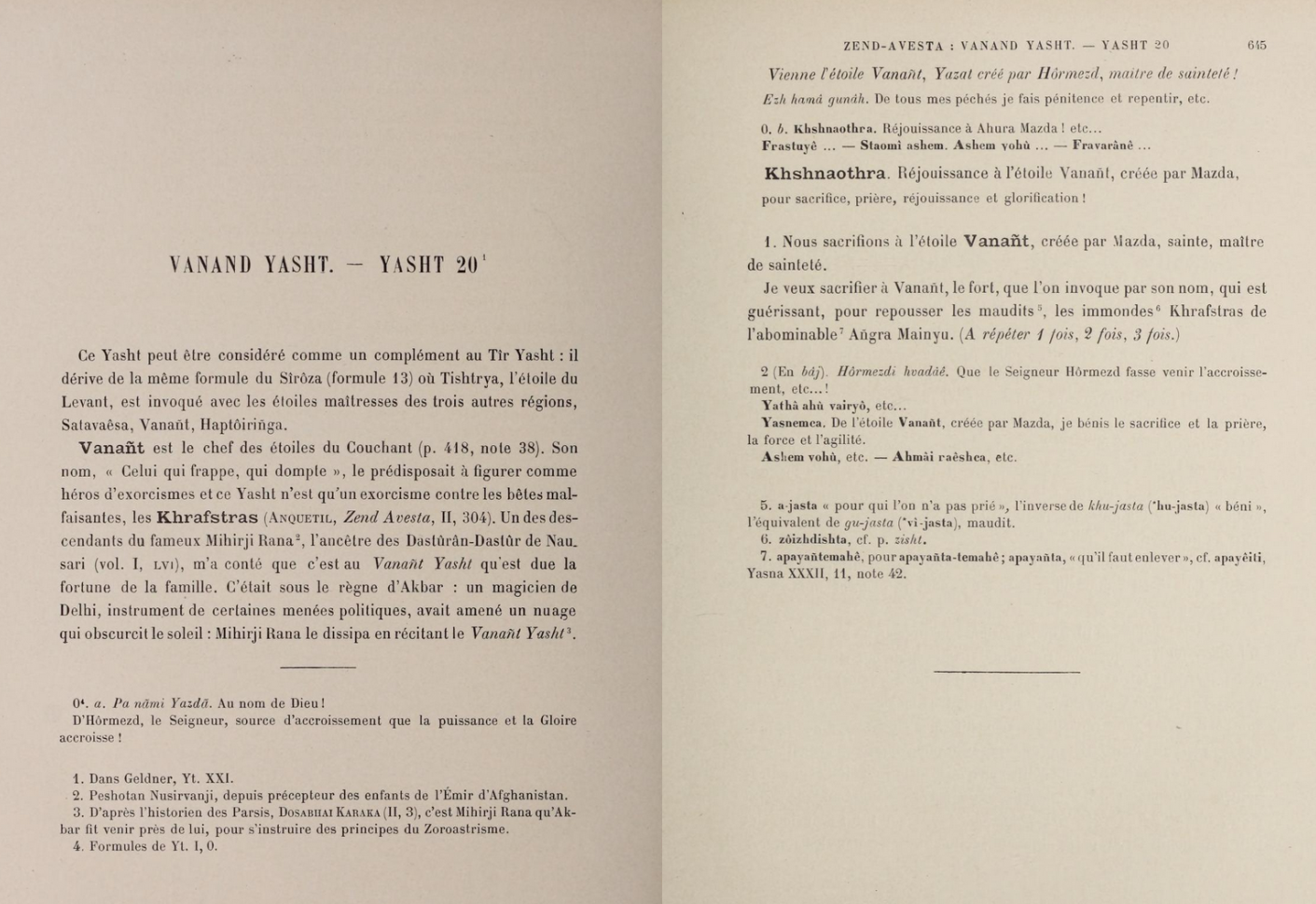
- Vanand Yasht (labeled as Yasht 20 therein) in Darmesteter's French translation

Information
- Religion: Zoroastrianism
- Language: Avestan
- Period: Avestan period
- Verses: 1

The Vanand Yasht also known as Wanand Yasht is the 21st hymn of the Yashts and dedicated to the praise of Vanant. It is the last and overall shortest hymn in the collection.

== Name ==
Vanand or Wanand is the Middle Persian name of Avestan Vanant, a minor Zoroastrian divinity representing the star of the West. It appears in later Zoroastrian literature like the Bundahishn together with Tishtar (East), Sataves (South) and Haptoring (North) as the four Royal stars of Persia. Its identity is unclear although it is often thought to represent Vega.

== Overview ==
The Vanand Yasht has a strong connection to the Tishtar Yasht in which Vanant is invoked alongside Tishtrya and Haptoring . According to Darmesteter, it is a mere supplement to that yasht and should be placed right after it. Excluding the introductory and closing formula, the Vanand Yasht has only one verse. This verse shows strong similarities to Sih-rozag 13 and may be derived from it.

== Within the Yasht collection ==
Within the collection of 21 Yashts, the Vanand Yasht is the last hymn. With only one stanza, it is overall the shortest hymn in the collection. Consequently, it is grouped among the so called Minor Yashts. Most editions of the Yasht collection rank it as the 21st yasht, but Darmesteter, for example, leaves out the Hom Yasht and places it instead as the 20th yasht. Similar to the Hom Yasht, it does not originate from the Bagan yasht, like most other yashts, but must have been drawn from another source.

== Ritual use ==
Like the Hom Yasht, the Vanand Yasht does not have a name day in the Sih-rozag. It is instead associated with the 30th day in the Zoroastrian calendar, which is dedicated to Anaghra, the endless light. In Zoroastrian practice, the yasht is used as a protective spell against noxious creatures and other forces of evil. For example, Darmesteter relates a story how during the reign of Akbar, a Zoroastrian priest allegedly used the yasht to dispell an evil charm obscuring the sun.

== Translations ==
The Vanant Yasht does have a short translation into Middle Persian. The first translation into English was published in 1883 by Darmesteter. In 1892, he also published a translation into French. In 1927, Lommel published a translation into German. A dedicated edition and translation of the yasht into Italian was produced in 1989 by Panaino.
