= Zamyad Yasht =

Zoroastrian religious hymn

- ← Ashtad Yasht Hom Yasht →
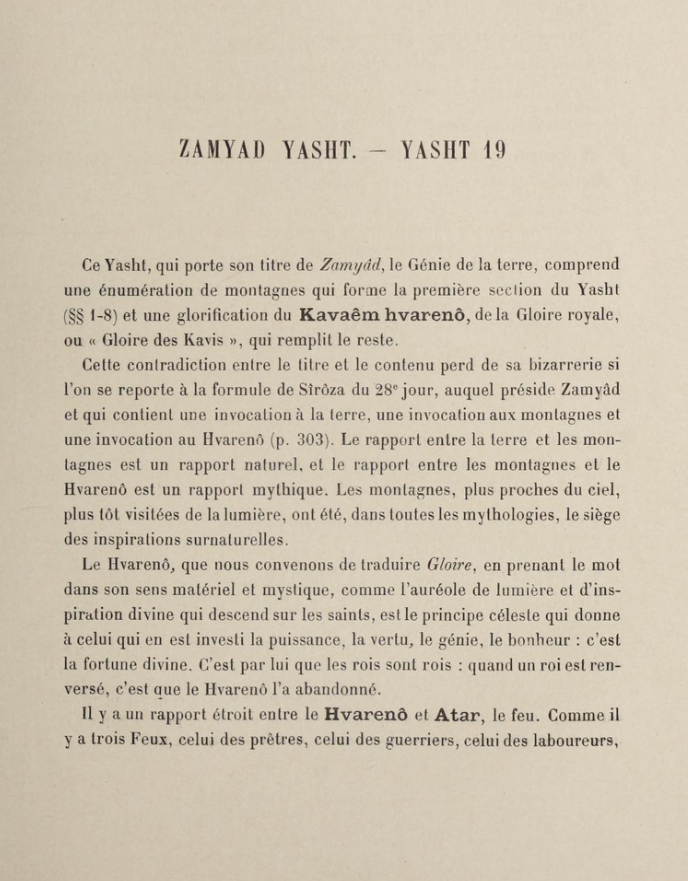
- First page of Darmesteter's French translation of the Zamyad Yasht

Information
- Religion: Zoroastrianism
- Language: Avestan
- Period: Avestan period
- Chapters: 15 kardes
- Verses: 96

The Zamyad Yasht also known as the Kayan Yasn is the nineteenth hymn of the 21 Yashts and is dedicated to the veneration of Zam. It belongs to the Legendary Yashts and, with 96 stanzas, it is the fourth longest in the collection.

== Name ==
The name of the yasht is reported in different ways in the sources. While today, the name Zamyad Yasht is widely used, the early manuscripts F1 and E1 use the name Kayan Yasn, i.e., Yasna of the Kayanians. This situation is caused by the disparate nature of the text, which consists of two different parts, one of which dedicated to the Kayanians.

In addition, the origin of Zamyad itself remains a matter of debate. While the first part is derived from Zam, the divinity of Earth to whom the yasht is dedicated, the second part is unclear. According to Pirar, it may be a corruption of zam yazata (Goddess Earth). Humbach and Ichaporia, however, reject this derivation based on the existence of the, otherwise implausible, phrase zamyad yazata (Goddess Zamyad), and derive it instead from a hypothetical early Middle Persian zam huyad yazad (munificent Goddess Earth).

== Overview ==
The Zamyad Yasht is generally divided into two distinct parts none of which mention Zam, i.e., the divinity of Earth to whom it is nominally dedicated. It has been speculated that the geographical references in the first part may establish a connection. The two parts are assumed to have originally been independent text, which were only joined at some later time. The yasht is celebrated on the 28th day of each month of the Zoroastrian calendar. Among the 21 Yashts, it is grouped into the Legendary Yashts because of the lengthy descriptions of the Kayanians.

== Content ==
The Zamyad Yasht consists of two parts. The first, smaller, part (stanzas 1-8) contains a description of important mountains of the Avestan world. The second, much longer, part (stanzas 9-96) is dedicated to the Kayanians. In addition to the partition into stanzas, the second part is furthermore grouped into 15 chapters, called kardas. This difference again points toward this part of the yasht having originally formed an independent text.

=== Geographical fragment - Stanzas 1-8 ===
The first part contains a list of mountains. This list is also found in the Bundahishn, where it is, however, followed by similar lists of seas, rivers, and lakes. This indicates that the Avestan descriptions in the Zamyad Yasht are the remnants of an originally much longer text, parts or all of which survived in the Middle Persian Bundahishn. This first part of the yasht is, therefore, called the geographical fragment.

=== Kayan Yasn - Stanzas 9-96 ===
The second part of the Zamyad Yasht is the Kayan Yasn proper. It is dedicated to the praise of the Kavyan Khvarenah, i.e., the Glory of the Kayanians and provides a long list of the early rulers of the Kayanians. The important role of the Khvarenah is established by the introductory verse of each karda being either "We worship the mighty Glory belonging to the Kavis" or "We worship the mighty un-taken Glory". The Khvarenah is often associated with mountains in the Avesta, and it has been speculated that this connection let to the joining of the two disparate parts.

== Editions and translations ==
The Zamyad Yasht has typically been edited by being part of the Avesta or Yasht collection. For example Darmesteter published in 1883 a translation into English and in 1892 into French. In 1927, Lommel published a translation of the Yasht collection into German. In addition, there have been editions focussing on the Zamyad Yasht specifically. In 1992, Eric Pirar published an edition of the Kayan Yasn, i.e., only Stanzas 9-96 including a translation and commentary into French. In 1994, Almut Hintze published a comprehensive edition of the yasht with a translation into German as well as a smaller one with a translation into English. In 1998, Humbach and Ichaporia published an edition of the Zamyad Yasht jointly with a translation into English and a commentary.
