= Ashtad Yasht =

Zoroastrian religious hymn

- ← Ard Yasht Zamyad Yasht →
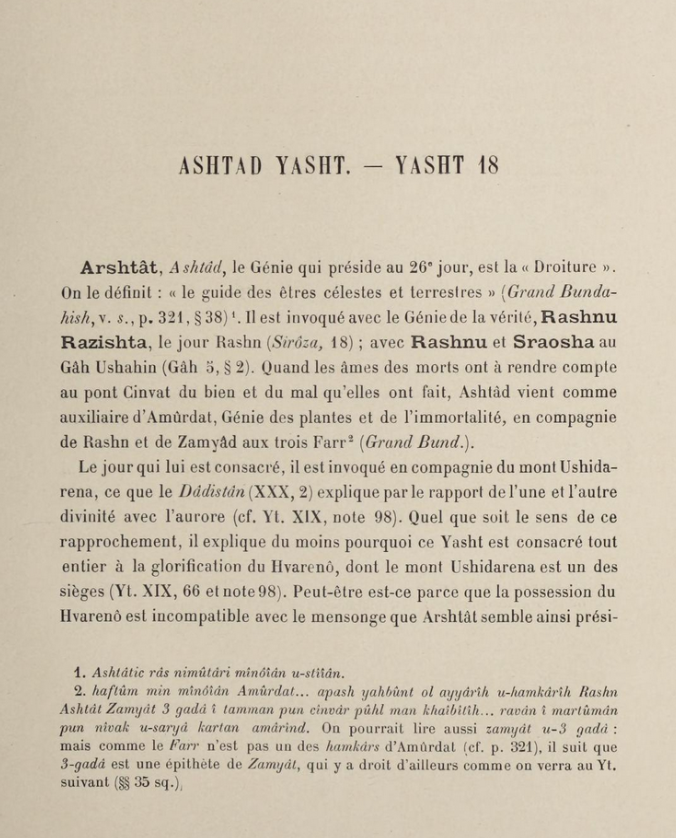
- First page of the Darmesteter's French translation of the Ashtad Yasht

Information
- Religion: Zoroastrianism
- Language: Avestan
- Period: Avestan period
- Verses: 8

The Ashtad Yasht is the eighteenth hymn of the 21 Yashts. It is named after Arshtat, the Zoroastrian divinity representing rectitude. The text, however, does not mention her.

== Name ==
Ashtad is the Middle Persian name of Arshtat the Zoroastrian hypostasis of rectitude. It is also the name of the 26th day of the month, on which the yasht is celebrated. The text, however, does not mention Arshtat but is mostly dedicated to the Khvarenah, i.e., the divine glory of the Iranians. It is thus unclear why it is named after Arshtat. Darmesteter opines that it is due to a connection between Arshtat and mount Ushi-darena, the place where the Khvarenah dwells. On the other hand, Lommel speculates that the occurrence of Avestan arš (correct) establishes a connection. Finally, Hintze argues that the connection may be due to the role of the Khvarenah, which also features prominently in Yasht 19.

== Within the Yasht collection ==
Within the collection of 21 Yashts, the Ashtad Yasht is the eighteenth hymn. It is a comparably short yasht consisting of only eight stanzas plus the introductory formula. It is generally grouped among the so called Minor Yashts. Like most of the yashts, it does not have a translation into Middle Persian. It probably once belonged to the Bagan yasht, where it may have formed its fifteenth chapter.

== Structure and content ==
According to Skjaervo, the Ashtad Yasht can divided into three parts. The first part (stanzas 1-2) is dedicated to the praise of the Khvarenah of the Iranians and its triumph over Angra Mainyu, Aeshma, Bushyasta, Apaosha, and Aneran. The second part (stanzas 3-5) is in praise of Ashi, whereas the third part (stanzas 5-7) describes the fight between Tishtrya and Apaosha. The last stanza 8 is devoted to the Ahuna vairya manthra, the most important Zoroastrian prayer.
