= Haft Amahraspand Yasht =

Zoroastrian religious hymn

- ← Ohrmazd Yasht Ardwahisht Yasht →
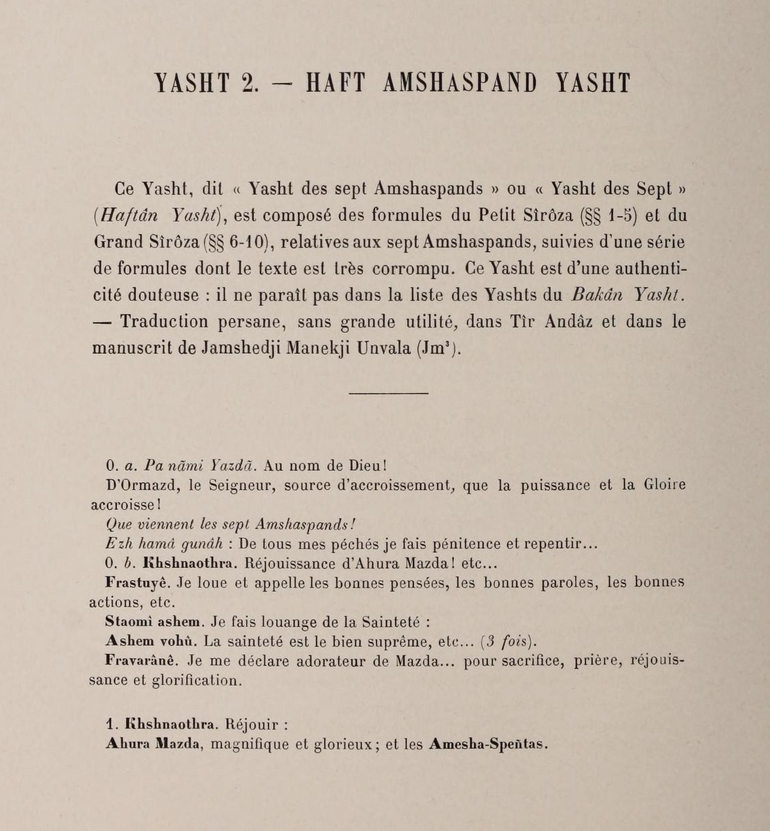
- First page of the Haft Amahraspand Yasht in Darmesteter's French translation

Information
- Religion: Zoroastrianism
- Language: Avestan
- Period: Avestan period
- Verses: 15

The Haft Amahraspand Yasht or Haf-tan Yasht is the second hymn of the Yashts, a collection of 21 yashts. It is named after and dedicated to the Amesha Spentas.

== Name ==
Haft Amahraspand is a compound term of Middle Persian haft, with the meaning seven, and amahraspand, the Middle Persian term for the Amesha Spenta. It therefore means the seven Amesha Spentas. The hymn is also known as Haf-tan Yasht or Haptan Yasht meaning Yasht of the Seven.

== Within the Yasht collection ==
Within the collection of 21 Yashts, the Haft Amahraspand Yasht is the second hymn. Overall, the literary quality of the yasht is considered inferior. It is performed on the first seven days of the month, which are dedicated to the Amesha Spenta.

There are a number of features which set it apart from the other yashts. First, while most yashts are dedicated to a single divinity, the Haft Amahraspand Yasht, as well as the Frawardin Yasht, is dedicated to several divinities. Furthermore, unlike most other yashts, it is not derived from the Bagan yasht, but must have been drawn from another source. Finally, the text does not follow the metrical pattern and the division into kardas as most other yashts.

== Structure and content ==
According to Darmesteter, the Haft Amahraspand Yasht can be divided into three main parts. The first part consists of stanzas 1–5, whereas the second part consists of stanzas 6–10. Both parts praise the Amesha Spantas using somewhat different formulas. According to Darmesteter, these two parts are drawn from the Sih-rozag, whereas Lommel considers them to be mere adaptation of the typical opening formulas of the yashts. The last part, comprising stanzas 11–15, is considered to contain the only verses original to the yasht. They are, however, written in a particularly defective Avestan, indicating them to be a late composition.
