= Ohrmazd Yasht =

Zoroastrian religious hymn

- Haft Amahraspand Yasht →
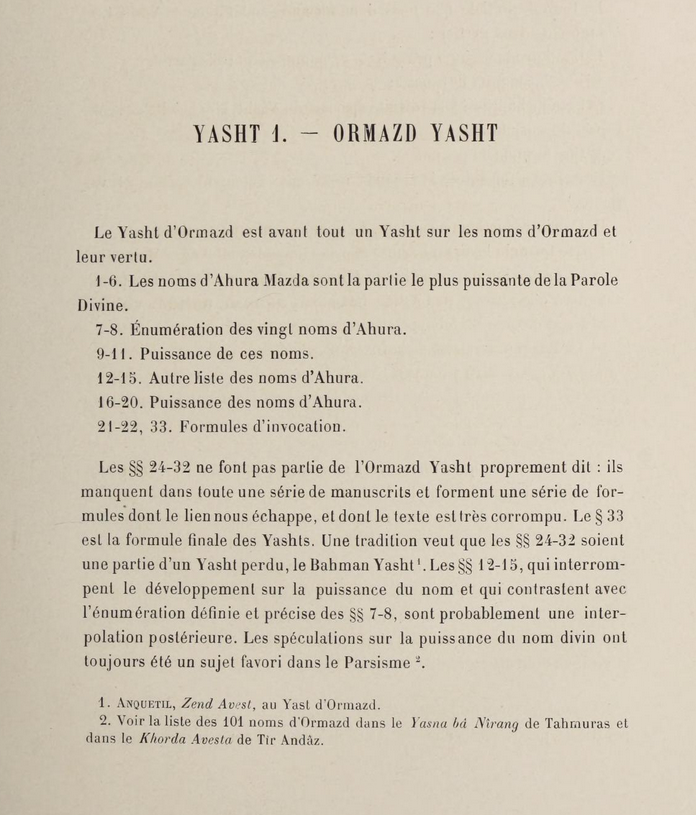
- First page of the Ohrmazd Yasht in Darmesteter's French translation

Information
- Religion: Zoroastrianism
- Language: Avestan
- Period: Avestan period
- Verses: 33

The Ohrmazd Yasht is the first hymn of the Yashts. It is named after and dedicated to Ahura Mazda, the central divinity of Zoroastrianism.

== Overview ==
Ohrmazd is the Middle Persian name of Ahura Mazda as well as of the first day of the month on which the yasht is celebrated. It consists of 33 stanzas. Within the collection of 21 Yashts, the Ohrmazd Yasht is the first hymn. Compared to the so called Great Yashts, it is assumed to be a later text. Regardless, it is by far the most popular of the hymns.

The Ormazd Yasht does not contain any of the elements typical of the legendary or Hymnic Yashts and is therefore categorized as a Minor Yasht. It does, however, use the so called frashna formula, where the texts is presented as a conversation between Zarathustra and Ahura Mazda.

== Structure and content ==
The content of the Ohrmazd Yasht primarily covers the many names of Ahura Mazda. After the introductory stanzas 1-6, stanzas 7-11 contain a list of the 20 names of Ahura Mazda and a description of their efficacy. Stanzas 12-15 contain a second list of names, which is independent from the first list and seems to be a later insertion.

Stanzas 16-19 continue the description from earlier part, i.e., they refer again to the first list. Stanzas 20-23 seeem to close off the yasht thematically with stanza 23 in particular containing the typical closing formula of the yashts. This part is, therefore, considered to have been its original ending. It is unclear when and why the remaining stanzas 24-33 were added to the text. Darmesteter, for example, has opined that they are a fragment from the lost Bahman Yasht to Vohu Manah.

== Translations ==
Next to Yasht 11, the Ohrmazd Yasht is the only yasht with an old translation in Middle Persian. In addition, the yasht has translations into modern Persian as well as Sanskrit. The first translation of the Ohrmazd Yasht into English was published in 1883 by Darmesteter. In 1892, he also published a translation into French. In 1927, Lommel published a translation into German. More recently, Panaino published a translation into English dedicated to the Ohrmazd Yasht as well as the Ram Yasht.
