= Rashn Yasht =

Zoroastrian religious hymn

- ← Srosh Yasht Hadoxt Frawardin Yasht →
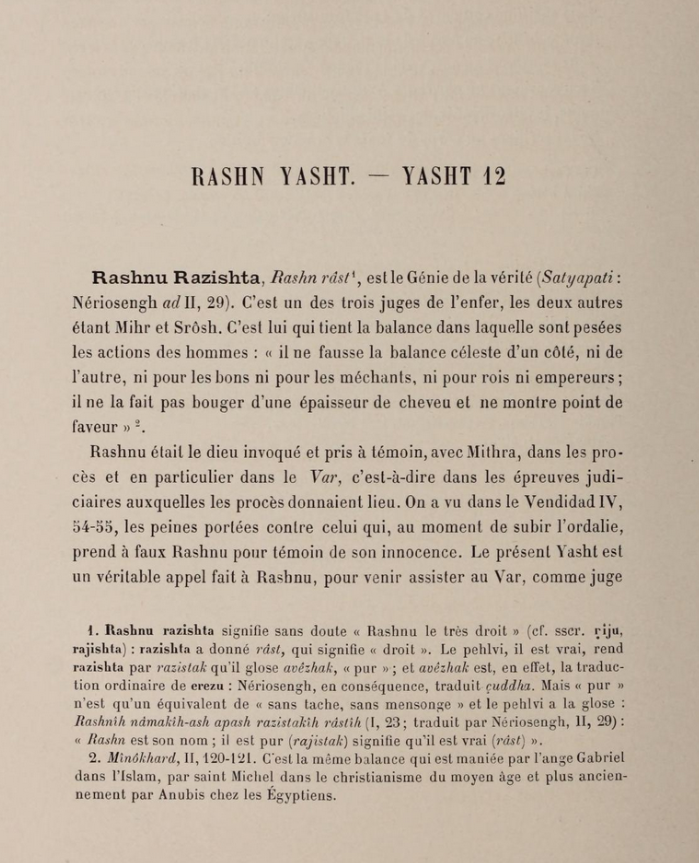
- First page of the Rashn Yasht in Darmesteter's French translation

Information
- Religion: Zoroastrianism
- Language: Avestan
- Period: Avestan period
- Verses: 38

The Rashn Yasht is the twelfth hymn of the 21 Yashts. It is named after and dedicated to the veneration of Rashnu, the Zoroastrian divinity representing Justice.

== Structure ==
The Rashn Yasht consists of 38 stanzas, but it is sometimes additionally divided into 30 or 31 sections called kardes. Such a subdivision can be found for many of the yashts. Its application to the Rash Yasht, however, is inconsistent, since several of the oldest manuscript traditions do not have it. As a consequence, there is no consensus in modern editions of the yasht as well. While, e.g., Westergaard and Darmesteter divide the yasht into kardes in their editions, Geldner and Lommel do not.

== Content ==
The Rashn Yasht begins with the typical framing of many yashts, as a dialogue between Zarathustra and Ahura Mazda. Unlike other yashts, however, this framing device is not used during the rest of the text. The next part is formed by stanzas 3-8. These verses include a description of the ritual actions that are needed to start the ordeal. The last part is by far the largest one and is formed by stanzas 9-37. It consists of a long list of 29 place names from which Rashnu is called forth to attend the ordeal. These verses are important for understanding the world view of the early Iranians.

== Use ==
It has been assumed that the main part of the yasht (stanzas 3-37) was originally used during Avestan times at a trial by ordeal. The opening stanzas may, therefore, have been added later to align the text with the structure established by other yashts. During Sasanian period it was part of the Bagan yasht where it may have formed the 9th chapter. In modern Zoroastrian practice, the Rashn Yasht is recited on the days the 7th, 18th, 26th, and 28th of the month in the Zoroastrian calendar, dedicated to Ameretat, Rashnu, Arshtat, and Zam, respectively.

== Editions and translations ==
The Rashn Yasht is extant in thirteen manuscripts in total, none of which contain a translation into Middle Persian. They have been made available in a number of editions and translations, typically as part of the Yasht collection of the Khordeh Avesta. Darmesteter published in 1883 a translation into English and in 1892 a translation into French. In 1927, Lommel published a translation of the Yasht collection into German. In 2009, Éric Pirart published an edition dedicated to the Rashn Yasht specifically and accompanied by a translation into French. In 2015, Leon Goldman published a critical edition of the Rashn Yasht accompanied by an English translation, commentary and glossary.
