= Drvaspa =

Goddess of the horse and protector of livestock in Zoroastrianism

Drvaspa Avestan: 𐬛𐬭𐬎𐬎𐬁𐬯𐬞𐬁
- Goddess of horses, protector of livestock
- Drvaspa in male form on the inverse of a Kushan coin
- Other names: Drvaspa, Druuaspa, Drwasp, Lrooaspo
- Affiliation: The Thirty-Three Deities, Guardians of the Days of the Month
- Symbol: Horses, chariots
- Attributes: Horse-drawn chariot, protection of herds, aid to worshippers
- Day: 14th day of every month in the Zoroastrian calendar
- Texts: Gosh Yasht
- Gender: Female
- Associated deities: Goshurvan, Ahrishwang, Anahita, Haoma

Equivalents
- Gallo-Roman: Epona

Drvaspa (Avestan: Druuāspā, also written Drwāspā or Drvaspa; Middle Persian: Druwāsp) is a female yazata in Zoroastrianism, whose name means “possessing sound horses” or “with sturdy horses” and whose protection extends to horses, herds and other livestock. She is invoked as a beneficent guardian who keeps animals healthy, drives a chariot and grants aid to her worshippers, including the legendary Iranian heroes whose sacrifices and requests are recounted in Yašt 9. The hymn is also known by its Middle Persian title Gosh Yašt, reflecting her association with Goshurvan, the Soul of the Cow, and the fourteenth day of the Zoroastrian calendar. Mary Boyce proposed that Drvaspa may have emerged as an independent goddess from a horse-related epithet of Ahrishwang, although this remains a scholarly hypothesis. On some Kushan coins, a deity associated with her name appears in male form, under a Bactrian inscription conventionally transcribed Lrooaspo or Lruwasp.

== Drvaspa as an independent goddess ==
The goddess Drvaspa protects horses and their health, and she is also a guardian of pastures and livestock. Beyond her short hymn, the Avestan texts give relatively little description of her. Her care extends to large and small cattle. In the opening verses of Yašt 9, she keeps flocks, herds, mature cattle and young animals healthy. She watches over them from afar and extends a wide and lasting friendship that brings them well-being. One word in the description is uncertain and has also been read as referring to a friend and a child. Drvaspa has also been compared with the Celtic horse goddess Epona, although her own character remains unusually elusive in the surviving Avestan material.

Yašt 9 is dedicated to Drvaspa and contains thirty-three verses arranged in seven kardes or divisions. Its first two verses give her distinctive epithets and invoke her with yazamaide, “we sacrifice.” Most of the remaining verses are adapted from other hymns. They recount sacrifices offered by early Iranian kings, heroes and religious figures. The customary offering consists of a hundred male horses, a thousand oxen, ten thousand lambs and libations. Haoma and Zoroaster make somewhat different offerings. Each worshipper asks the goddess for a particular boon, and the hymn repeatedly recounts her granting it.

Her hymn praises her as powerful, holy, created by Ohrmazd and a maintainer of those who worship her. She yokes teams of horses, turns her chariot and makes its wheels resound. Her epithets describe vigor, prosperity, health and strength. She can stand firm or turn to assist the faithful. The description of her chariot as gleaming or well-fed is textually uncertain. The worship offered to her includes libations, haoma plants, meat and the baresma, together with holy formulas, speech, deeds and properly spoken words. Her brightness and glory are repeatedly invoked, and the Yênhê hâtãm prayer appears in the closing ritual formula. Drvaspa is classed among specifically Iranian divinities alongside Ardwisur Anahid and xvarənah. Drvaspa is also associated with Ahrishwang and Mithra in the Avesta.

Hushang, called the Paradhata, sacrifices on the enclosure of Mount Hara, the beautiful height made by Ohrmazd. He offers a hundred male horses, a thousand oxen, ten thousand lambs and libations. He asks to overcome all the daevas of Mazana and never to bow before them in terror. Instead, he wants the daevas to fear him, bow before him and flee into darkness (hell). Drvaspa grants him the boon. Jamshid, the good shepherd, sacrifices on the height of Hukairya with the same offerings. He asks to bring fatness, abundant flocks and immortality into the world created by Ohrmazd. He also seeks to remove hunger, thirst, old age, death, hot winds and cold winds from the world for a thousand years. Drvaspa grants his wish.

Fereydun, heir of the valiant Athwya family, makes his offering in the four-cornered Varena with a hundred male horses, a thousand oxen, ten thousand lambs and libations. He asks to defeat Aži Dahāka, the three-mouthed, three-headed and six-eyed being with a thousand senses. Aži Dahāka is called the strongest destructive druj created by Ahriman against the material world, destined to destroy the world of the good principle. Fereydun also asks to free the two women Savanghavack and Erenavach, celebrated for their extraordinary beauty. Their names also appear in the forms Savanghavâk and Erenavâk. Drvaspa grants his request after he offers libations, gifts and sacrifices. The same episode is also mentioned in Yašts 5, 15 and 17.

Haoma, described as healing, life-giving, beautiful, lordly and golden-eyed, sacrifices on the highest point of Haraiti Bareza. He asks to bind the Turanian murderer Afrasiab and drag him captive before King Kay Khosrow. Kay Khosrow would then kill him behind Lake Chaechasta, the deep lake of salt waters, to avenge the murders of his father Siyavash and of Aghraeratha. The two victims are described respectively as a man and a semi-man. The goddess grants Haoma's request. Kay Khosrow himself, described as the king who united the Aryan peoples into one kingdom, offers a hundred male horses, a thousand oxen, ten thousand lambs and libations beside Lake Chaechasta. He asks to kill Afrasiab there in vengeance for Siyavash and Aghraeratha, and receives the boon from Drvaspa.

Zoroaster worships Drvaspa in Airyana Vaejah beside the river Daitya. His offerings include haoma, meat, baresma, holy spells, the wisdom of the tongue, speech, deeds, libations and rightly spoken words. He asks that Hutaosa come to think, speak and act according to the Mazdean law, spread it among others and praise his deeds. Drvaspa grants his petition. Kavi Vīštāspa sacrifices beside the same river with a hundred male horses, a thousand oxen, ten thousand lambs and libations. He asks to drive away Ashta-aurvant, the son of Vispa-thaurvo-asti. This opponent is described with a bronze helmet, bronze armor, a thick neck and seven hundred camels following behind him. Vīštāspa also seeks to put to flight the Hvyaona enemy Arejat-aspa and the daeva-worshipper Darshinika. He asks to strike down Tathravant, associated with the bad law, and Spinjaurushka, another worshipper of the daevas. He further asks to bring the Varedhakas and Hvyaonas to the good law and to defeat Hvyaona forces counted in fifties, hundreds, thousands, tens of thousands and still greater multitudes. Drvaspa grants the requested victories. The recurring invocations include the goddess's brightness and glory and the sacrificial gifts offered in return for her protection.

Outside the Avestan hymns, Drvaspa appears in the medieval Bundahishn (Greater Bundahishn 26.65), where her steeds are compared with those of Hvare-khshaeta, the divinity of the shining sun. Her name also appears in another form on the coinage of Kushan Bactria. A reverse issued under Kanishka shows a male deity riding a horse and holding out a beribboned diadem. The inscription is read as ΛΡΟΟΑΣΠΟ (Lrooaspo or Lruwasp). Other transcriptions include ΑΡΟΟΑΣΠΟ and DROOASPO. This figure has been identified with Drvaspa, despite the change from a female goddess in the Avesta to a male deity on the coins. The horse-riding figure and the diadem have parallels on coins of the Indo-Bactrian ruler Hippostratos at Taxila (about 80–60 BCE), the Indo-Parthian Gondophares (about 26–45 CE) and the early Kushan ruler Soter Megas (Vima Takto). The imagery has also been compared with the Dioscuri, whose male representation has been proposed as a possible influence. Other instances of changing divine gender in Kushan imagery suggest that such shifts did not necessarily arise from Greek models.

The change from Old Iranian initial dr- to Bactrian lr- is regular, so the name Druwāsp could appear as Lrooaspo or Lruwasp in Bactrian. A different identification connects the coin legend with the Middle Persian name Lwhlʾsp or Lohrāsp, belonging to Vīštāspa's father. This identification is problematic because his Avestan name is Auruuaṱ.aspa-, meaning “of rapid horses.” The regular Bactrian sound change makes derivation from Lohrāsp unnecessary. It is even possible that the Bactrian divine name influenced the later Persian form Luhrāsp, known from the Shāhnāme.

== Drvaspa as Ahrishwang ==
Drvaspa may originally have been an epithet of Ahrishwang, the Iranian goddess of recompense and fortune, before becoming an independent goddess. The proposed epithet, “possessing sound horses,” would have described Ahrishwang's connection with horses and chariots. Ahrishwang herself was a powerful pre-Zoroastrian divinity associated with the fortune of warriors and perhaps widely worshipped by fighting men.

The strongest textual connection lies between the hymns addressed to the two goddesses. Most of the thirty-three verses of Drvaspa's Yašt 9 reproduce verses 27–52 of Yašt 17, the Ard Yašt dedicated to Ahrishwang, with the divine name changed as needed. Only the opening two verses of Yašt 9 contain epithets particular to Drvaspa. The rest contains little independent material. Haoma, Zoroaster and the early Iranian heroes sacrifice to Ahrishwang in Yašt 17. The same list of worshippers, with their petitions, appears in Yašt 9. The account of Ahrishwang in the Ard Yašt also preserves her chariot and her role in the fortune of battle. The borrowed material also connects Yašt 9 with Yašt 5, the hymn to Ardwisur Anahid. The prayers and invocations addressed to Drvaspa closely resemble passages dedicated to Ahrishwang and Arədvi. In Yašt 17.45–47, Yašt 9.25–27 and Yašt 5.106–108, Zoroaster seeks help from each goddess in bringing the same woman to accept his religious teaching. Each goddess grants the boon, and Zoroaster succeeds in his request.

== Drvaspa as Goshurvan ==
Drvaspa is alternatively thought to be the bovine deity Goshurvan, the Soul of the Cow, to whom she is regularly linked with, and Goshtashan, also concerned with the protection of animals. The Sīrōza (1.14) invokes all three as patrons of "Gosh", the fourteenth day of the Zoroastrian month. Their shared guardianship embraces the animal world, especially cattle and horses. The association of the fourteenth day with the hymn to Drvaspa may reflect a deliberate theological arrangement of the calendar and its worship.

The Middle Persian title of Yašt 9 is Gosh Yašt, “hymn to Gosh” or “hymn to the kine,” even though Drvaspa is the goddess to whom it is dedicated. She is invoked directly in the opening verses. The rest of the hymn consists largely of prayers and invocations shared with the hymns of Ahrishwang and Anahid. Its contents therefore concern cattle and their protection as much as the horses suggested by Drvaspa's name. In one interpretation, Drvaspa, “she who keeps horses in health,” is an epithet of Gosh or Goshurvan. The latter name comes from Goshurvan, the Soul of the primordial Bull. Drvaspa would thus be Goshurvan in her horse-protecting capacity. This account also connects the name of the hymn with Goshurvan day and notes that its series of worshippers and prayers matches the corresponding material in the hymn to Ahrishwang.

== Bibliography ==
- Anklesaria, Behramgore Tehmuras (1956), Greater Bundahishn, Bombay: Rahnumae Mazdayasnan Sabha
- Boyce, Mary (1975), History of Zoroastrianism, vol. 1, Leiden: Brill
- Dhalla, Maneckji Nusserwanji (1938), A History of Zoroastrianism, New York: OUP
- Kellens, Jean (1994), "Drvāspā", Encyclopedia Iranica, vol. 7, Costa Mesa: Mazda
