= Hom Yasht =

Zoroastrian religious hymn

- ← Zamyad Yasht Vanand Yasht →
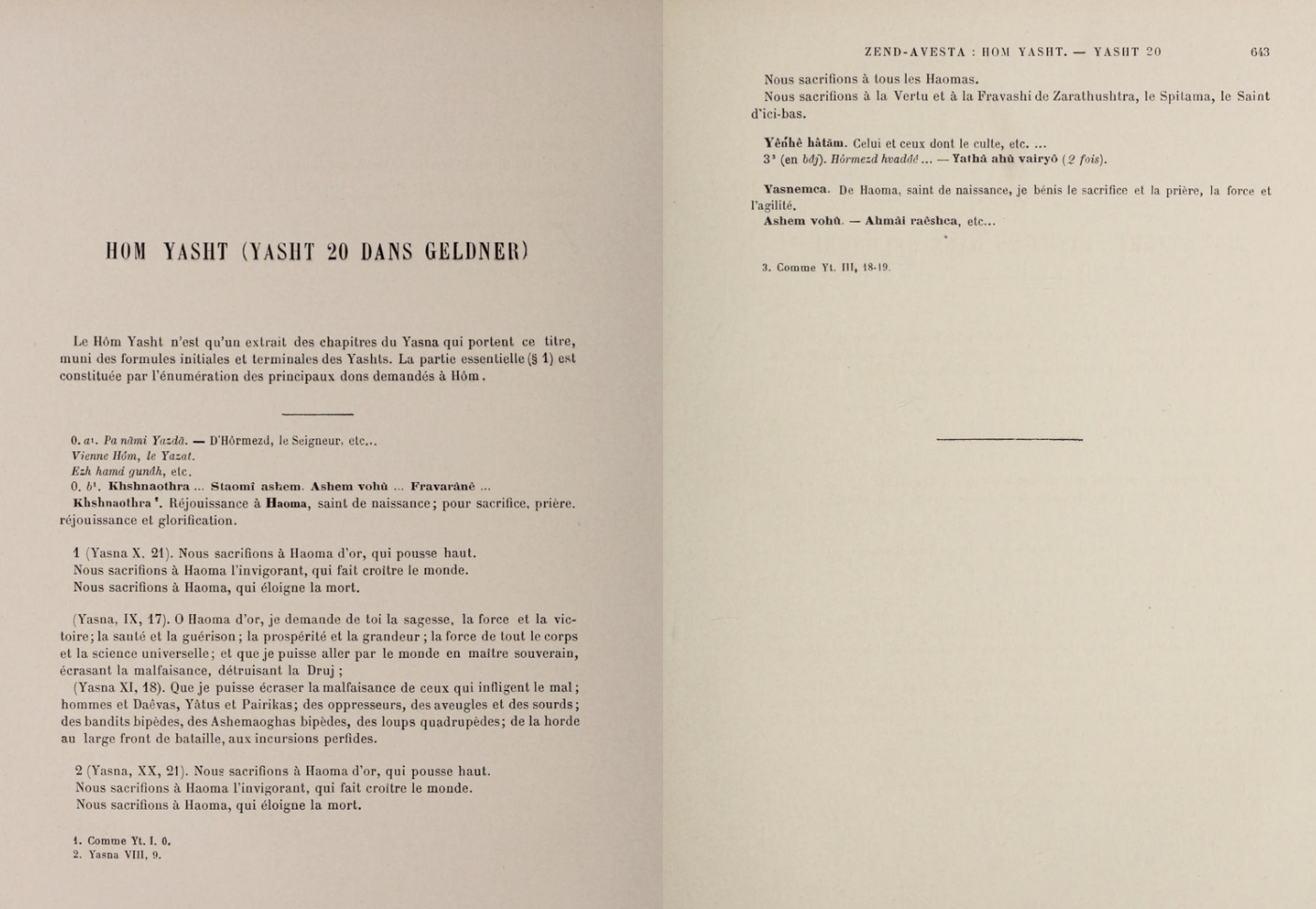
- Hom Yasht in Darmesteter's French translation

Information
- Religion: Zoroastrianism
- Language: Avestan
- Period: Avestan period
- Verses: 2

The Hom Yasht is the 20th hymn of the 21 Yashts. It must not be confused with the Hom Stom, another text which is named after and dedicated to the praise of Haoma. With only two verses, it is the second shortest hymn in the collection.

== Name ==
Hom is the Middle Persian name of Hauma, the Avestan name of the sacred plant of Zoroastrianism and its associated divinity. Avestan 𐬵𐬀𐬊𐬨𐬀 (hauma) is cognate with Sanskrit सोम (soma), the sacred plant of the Vedas. It is, therefore, considered to derive from a common Indo-Iranian sáwHmas, with the meaning extract. However, the botanical identity of the plant is still an open question

== Overview ==
The Yashts comprises 21 hymns, each of which is dedicated to individual Zoroastrian divinities and connected with a specific day of the Zoroastrian calendar. The collection is extant through the E1 and F1 manuscripts, dating back to 1601 and 1591, respectively. Already in the E1 manuscript, the Hom Yasht was listed as the 20th yasht. Most of the yashts were originally part of the Bagan yasht, one of the, now lost, volumes of the Sasanian Avesta. However, according to the notes in the E1 manuscript, the Hom Yasht was not, meaning it must have been drawn from another source. Due to its shortness and perceived lack in poetic quality, the Hom Yasht is grouped into the so called Minor or Apotropaic Yashts.

Excluding the introductory and closing formulas, The Hom Yasht has only 2 stanzas, making it is the second shortest yasht in the collection. Like the 21st Vanant Yasht, the overall shortest of the yashts, it does not have a name day in the Zoroastrian calendar. Instead, it is celebrated on the 29th day, which is dedicated to Manthra Spenta, the divinity personifying manthras.

== Connection to the Hom Stom ==
The Hom Stom, also called Hom Yasht, is another Avestan text dedicated to the praise of Hauma. This is not a stand-alone text but comprises chapters 9-11 of the Yasna. During the Yasna liturgy, the consumation of the parahom, i.e., the Hauma drink, takes place. The Hom Stom is overall a much longer text and the two verses of the Hom Yasht are considered to be derived from some of its verses.

== Manuscripts, editions and translations ==
The oldest manuscripts which contain the Hom Yasht are the E1 and F1 manuscripts, dating back to 1601 and 1591, respectively. Like other Minor Yashts, there is no edition specifically dedicated to it. Instead, the Hom Yasht has been edited and translated as part of the wider Avesta or Yasht collection. While it is not included in Westergaard's edition, its Avestan text can be found in Geldner's seminal edition of the Avesta. A translation into French was provided by Darmester, whereas his English translation of the Yashts does not include it.. In 1927, Lommel provided a translation into German.
