= Hadoxt nask =

Zoroastrian religious literature

The Hadoxt nask is the sixth nask (volume) of the Sasanian Avesta. The work is no longer extant, but the Hadoxt nask fragments as well as possibly other parts of the extant Avesta are considered to have been part of this nask.

== Sources ==
The nask itself is no longer extant. Some information on its content are given in Book 8 of the Denkard, a 9th-10th century compendium of Zoroastrianism. In addition, the Rivayats, a series of epistles from the 15th - 17th century, give a short overview on the content of the Hadoxt nask.

== Name ==
The name of the Hadoxt nask is derived from an Avestan adjective haδaoxta, with the meaning of recited with or together with that which is spoken. Jean Kellens has for instance opined that this nask originally contained texts which complemented other texts, in particular, the texts of the Stot yasht.

== In the Sasanian Avesta ==
The Sasanian Avesta was organized into 21 nasks, i.e., volumes, which were grouped into 3 divisions; the Gāhānīg (Gathic nasks), Hada Mānsrīg (manthras connected with the ritual), and Dādīg (legal nasks). Within this scheme, the Hadoxt nask was considered to be part of the Gāhānīg nasks, dealing with the contents of the Gathas. It consisted of either 133 or 134 chapters. Edward William West estimates, that the Hadoxt nask consisted of ca. 8.400 words of Avestan text accompanied by ca. 17.400 words of commentary in Pahlavi.

== In the extant Avesta ==
Although not being related to the content described in the Denkard, the Hadoxt nask 1 and Hadoxt nask 2 fragments are considered to have formed the first three fragards of the Hadoxt nask. Hadoxt 1 is a commentary on the Ashem Vohu manthra and may have originally been the first chapter. Hadoxt 2 provides a discussion of the fate of the soul after death. The Hadoxt fragments have been edited by West and Haug in 1872 as an appendix to the Book of Arda Viraf. A more recent edition was provided by Piras with a translation into Italian.

Based on the description given in the Denkard and the Rivayats, different authors have tried to identify other surviving Avestan texts which may have belonged to the Hadoxt nask. The so called Fshusho manthra (Y. 58) was considered, e.g., by James Darmesteter to be a part of the nask. Karl Friedrich Geldner, however, exlcuded it but considered the Srosh Yasht (Yt. 11) and the Afrinagan i Gasanoar (A. 3) to be part of the nask. Also, Jivanji Jamshedji Modi referred to Yasna 56 as “Srosh Hadokht”, without providing any discussion or textual analysis regarding its possible relationship with the Hadokht Nask.
