= Darmesteter =

Darmesteter is a surname. Notable people with the surname include:

- Agnes Mary Frances Duclaux (once Darmesteter) (1857–1944), English writer and scholar
- Arsène Darmesteter (1846–1888), French philologist
- James Darmesteter (1849–1894), French antiquarian
