= Haurvatat =

Zoroastrian concept of "perfection"

- Amshaspand of perfection and wholeness
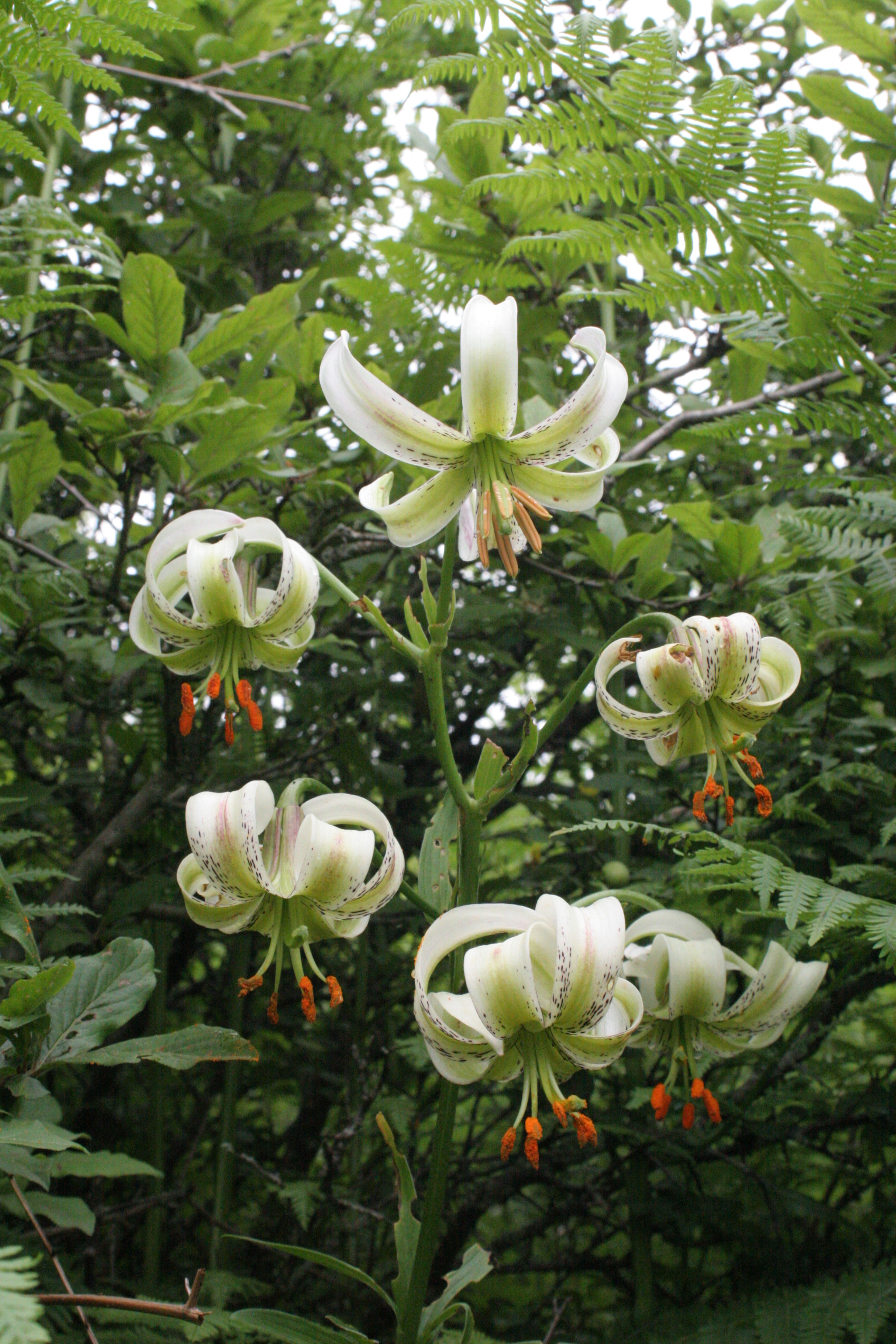
- Lilium ledebourii, the sacred flower of Haurvatat
- Avestan: Haurvatat
- Affiliation: The Thirty-Three Deities, Guardians of the Days of the Month, The Twelve Deities, Amesha Spenta
- Sacred flower: Lilium
- Attributes: Clarity, Perfection, Protection of Water.
- Enemy: Tauriz
- Day: 6th of each month in the Iranian calendar
- Festivals: Khordadgān
- Associated deities: Ameretat, Vayu-Vata, Tishtrya, Fravashi

Equivalents
- Islam: Harut

Haurvatat (/ˈhəʊrvətət/; Avestan: 𐬵𐬀𐬎𐬭𐬎𐬎𐬀𐬙𐬁𐬙, romanized: ha^{u}ruuatāt) is the Avestan language word for the Zoroastrian concept of "wholeness" or "perfection." In post-Gathic Zoroastrianism, Haurvatat was the Amesha Spenta associated with water (cf. apo), prosperity, and health.

Etymologically, Avestan haurvatat derives from an Indo-Iranian root and is linguistically related to Vedic Sanskrit sarvatāt "intactness, perfection". The Indo-Iranian root has in turn Indo-European origins. In Common Era Zoroastrian tradition, Haurvatat appears as Middle Persian Hordad, continuing in New Persian as Khordad. The Iranian civil calendar of 1925, which adopted Zoroastrian calendar month names, has Khordad as the name of the 3rd month of the year.

The Avestan language noun haurvatat is grammatically feminine and in scripture the divinity Haurvatat is a female entity. However, in tradition (K)Hordad was/is considered male; this development is attributed to the loss of grammatical gender in Middle Persian. In Isis and Osiris 46, Plutarch translates Haurvatat as Πλοῦτος ploutos "wealth, riches" and equates the divinity with "Plutus," the Greek god of riches.

== Scripture ==
=== Gathas ===
Like the other Amesha Spentas also, Haurvatat is already attested in the Gathas, the oldest texts of the Zoroastrianism and considered to have been composed by Zoroaster himself. And like most other principles, Haurvatat is not unambiguously an entity in those hymns. Unlike four of the other Amesha Spentas, Haurvatat does not have a standing epithet that in later Avesta texts becomes an element of her proper name.

Already in the Gathas, Haurvatat is closely allied with Ameretat, the Amesha Spenta of "Immortality". Addressing Ahura Mazda in Yasna 34.11, the prophet Zoroaster exclaims that "both Wholeness and Immortality are for sustenance" in the Kingdom of God. In the same verse, as also in Yasna 45.10 and 51.7, parallels are drawn between Ameretat and Haurvatat on the one hand and "endurance and strength" on the other.

=== Younger Avesta ===
The relationship between Ameretat and Haurvatat is carries forward into the Younger Avesta (Yasna 1.2; 3.1; 4.1; 6.17; 7.26; 8.1 etc.; Yasht 1.15; 10.92). The Younger Avestan texts allude to their respective guardianships of plant life and water (comparable with the Gathic allusion to sustenence), but these identifications are only properly developed in later tradition (see below). These associations with also reflect the Zoroastrian cosmological model in which each of the Amesha Spentas is identified with one aspect of creation.

The antithetical counterpart of Haurvatat is demon (daeva) Tarshna "thirst," while Ameretat's is Shud "hunger." Ameretat and Haurvatat are the only two Amesha Spentas who are not already assigned an antithetical counterpart in the Gathas. In the eschatological framework of Yasht 1.25, Ameretat and Haurvatat represent the reward of the righteous after death (cf. Ashi and ashavan). Haurvatat and Ameretat will destroy the demons of hunger and thirst at the final renovation of the world (Yasht 19.95-96).

Unlike Ameretat, Haurvatat has a Yasht consecrated to her (Yasht 4), and is invoked as the protector of the seasons and years (Yasht 4.0, Siroza 1.6, 2.6). In Yasht 4.1, Haurvatat is described as having been created by Ahura Mazda for "the help, joy, comfort, and pleasure of the ashavan." The righteous can put demons to flight by invoking the name of Haurvatat (Yasht 4.2). In Yasht 4.4, Haurvatat is implored to give mankind the power to withstand the seductive attacks of the Pairikas, the devilish sprites of Angra Mainyu.

== Tradition ==
Through the association with plants and water, Ameretat (MP: Amurdad) and Haurvatat (MP: Hordad) are consequently identified with food and drink (cf. sustenance in the Gathas, above), and traditionally it was out of respect for these two Amesha Spentas (MP: Ameshaspand) that meals were to be taken in silence. In Book of Arda Viraf 23.6–8, the righteous Viraz sees a man punished in hell "for consuming Hordad and Amurdad while unlawfully chattering while he chewed."

In the Bundahishn, a Zoroastrian account of creation completed in the 12th century, Ameretat and Haurvatat appear—together with Spenta Armaiti (MP: Spendarmad), the third female Amesha Spenta—on the left hand of Ahura Mazda (Bundahishn 26.8). Throughout Zoroastrian scripture and tradition, these three principles are most consistently identified with the creations that they represent: respectively plant life, water, and earth. In Arda Viraf 35.13, the three daughters of Zoroaster are described to be in the image of Armaiti, Ameretat, and Haurvatat.

In the hierarchy of yazatas, Haurvatat has as her assistants or cooperators (hamkars) three lesser yazatas: Vata-Vayu of the wind and atmosphere, Manthra Spenta of "bountiful spells" and the Fravashis, the hordes of guardian spirits.

In the day-name and month-name dedications of the Zoroastrian calendar (that makes the basis for the Jalali calendar), the sixth day of the month and third month of the year are named after Haurvatat/Hordad/Khordad/Xordad and are under her protection. The Iranian civil calendar of 1925 reinstated Zoroastrian month-name conventions and hence also has Khordad as the third month of the year, beginning at May 22 (21. in leap years). This calendar is thus the one with which western astrology is most accurately corresponding. Khordad confers exactly with Gemini, the passage of the sun through the ecliptical segment of 60 - 90 degrees from vernal equinox.

== Religiosity ==
Haurvatat-Ameretat (Pahlavi hrwdʼd ʼmwrdʼd) appears in Sogdian language texts as hrwwt mrwwt. A relationship to Armenian hawrot mawrot has been suggested but is not confirmed. According to Islam tradition, Al-Quran mentions two Angels sent to Babil (Babylon) named Harut and Marut, to test people faith because they teach witchcraft and sorcery. These entities stated that they were sent to test the faith of the people before teaching them.

== Bibliography ==
- Boyce, Mary (1975), History of Zoroastrianism, vol. 1, Leiden: Brill, pp. 205–208
- Boyce, Mary (1983), "Amurdād", Encyclopaedia Iranica, vol. 1, New York: Routledge & Kegan Paul, pp. 997–998
- Dhalla, Maneckji N. (1938), History of Zoroastrianism, New York: OUP, pp. 171–172
- Panaino, Antonio (2004), "Hordād", Encyclopaedia Iranica, vol. 12, Costa Mesa: Mazda, archived from the original on 2007-10-06
