= Aban Yasht =

Zoroastrian religious hymn

- ← Hordad Yasht Xwarshed Yasht →
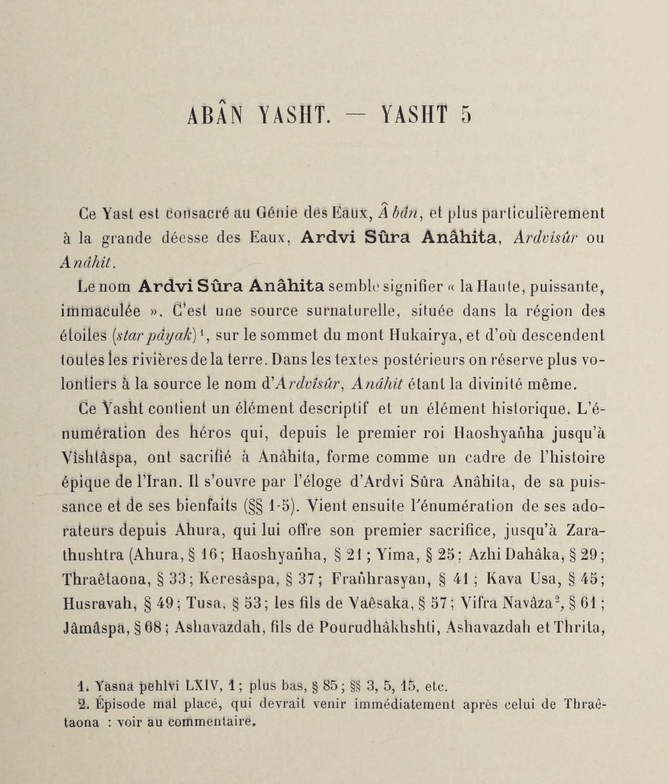
- First page of Darmesteter's French translation of the Aban Yasht

Information
- Religion: Zoroastrianism
- Language: Avestan
- Period: Avestan period
- Chapters: 20 kardes
- Verses: 132

The Aban Yasht is the fifth hymn of the 21 Yashts. It is named after Aban, the Waters, but is actually in praise of Anahita. It belongs to the so called Legendary Yashts and, with 132 stanzas, it is the third longest in the collection.

== Overview ==
The Aban Yasht is named after Aban, the personification of the Waters, but its content makes it clear that it is actually addressed to Anahita. Anahita is a goddess of rivers and lakes and, in Zoroastrian practice, she fused with Aban over time. It is the fifth hymn of the 21 Yasht collection and it is grouped into the Legendary Yashts, due to the lengthy descriptions of Avestan heroes sacrificing to her.

Several verses of the yasht form the Aban Niyayishn, also known as the Ardwi Sur Banu Niyayishn. The Aban Niyayishn is the fourth prayer from the Niyayishn collection, and likewise dedicated to Aban and Anahita. Both the Aban Yasht and Aban Niyayishn are never recited in the presence of fire but only near bodies of water.

== Content ==
Stanzas 1-16 form the opening of the yasht by praising the boons granted by Anahita. This opening is followed by two long parts ranging from stanzas 17-84 and 97-118, which describe how specific persons sacrificed to Anahita in order to receive such a boon. These descriptions are highly formulaic beginning with a verse describing the person performing the sacrifice, then a verse where a boon is asked for and finally a verse describing whether the boon was granted.

Thraêtaona of the house rich in life-giving strength sacrificed to her, the son of the house of Âthviya, by four-cornered Varna a hundred stallions, a thousand bulls, ten thousand rams.

Thus he asked her: Give me that prize, O good, Ardwî Sûrâ Anâhitâ, you most rich in life-giving strength, that I may overcome the giant dragon [...]

She gave him then that prize, Ardwî Sûrâ Anâhitâ. The giver of prizes to the expert (poet-sacrificer) carrying (Barsom) together with libations who sacrifices to (her and) asks (her favors). On account of her wealth and munificence [...] Thus, we sacrifice to the male and female deities [...]

— Yasht 5.33 - 5.35 (translated by Prods Oktor Skjaervo).

These two parts are separated by stanzas 85-96, which describe how Anahita descends from heaven and Zarathustra's injunctions on how to properly perform the sacrifice. It has been noted that the first part lists people like Yima and Thraetaona, associated with the mythical history of the Avestan people, whereas the second part lists people like Zarathustra and Vistaspa, associated with the Gathas. Stanzas 85-96 may therefore have served to signal the arrival of the new religion instituted by Zarathustra. Finally, stanzas 119-132 form the closing of the yasht, by describing and praising Anahita's appearance.

== History ==
The Aban Yasht is the product of a fluid oral culture, where over a long period of time material was added, revised and adapted. Some of the poetic elements in the yasht may point to very early times like the image of Anahita wearing beaver fur. Since this animal lives mostly in the northern regions of Eurasia, this image is sometimes assumed to go back to a time when the Iranians lived further north. Other elements are often speculated to have originated during the Achaemenid period. Since some verses have a focus on her visual representation, it has been speculated that they were added during the 5th-4th century BCE., when statues of Anahita were erected in Persia. This connection has however been criticized, such that the visual description in the yasht is more akin to a vision than a description of a statue. In general, there is no consenus on the dating and more recent scholarship has remained sceptical of connecting specific verses to a specific time period.

The purely oral history of the Aban Yasht ended during the Sasanian period, when the Avestan literature was edited into a comprehsive anthology of 21 volumes. Within this edition, the Aban Yasht was placed with a number of other yashts in the Bagan yasht, where it formed the second chapter. This work is now lost but the Aban Yasht survived by being part of the collection of 21 Yashts, which is extant through the F1 and E1 manuscript traditions.

There are no modern editions dedicated to the Aban Yasht alone but its text and translations is made available through critical editions of either the whole Avesta or the Yasht collection. For example Darmesteter published in 1883 a translation into English and in 1892 a translation into French, which also included an appendix. In 1927, Lommel published a translation of the Yasht collection into German.
