= Celestial Commanders =

Divine celestial generals commanding the stars in Zoroastrianism

Celestial Generals
- Commanders of the stars in the four quadrants of the first heaven
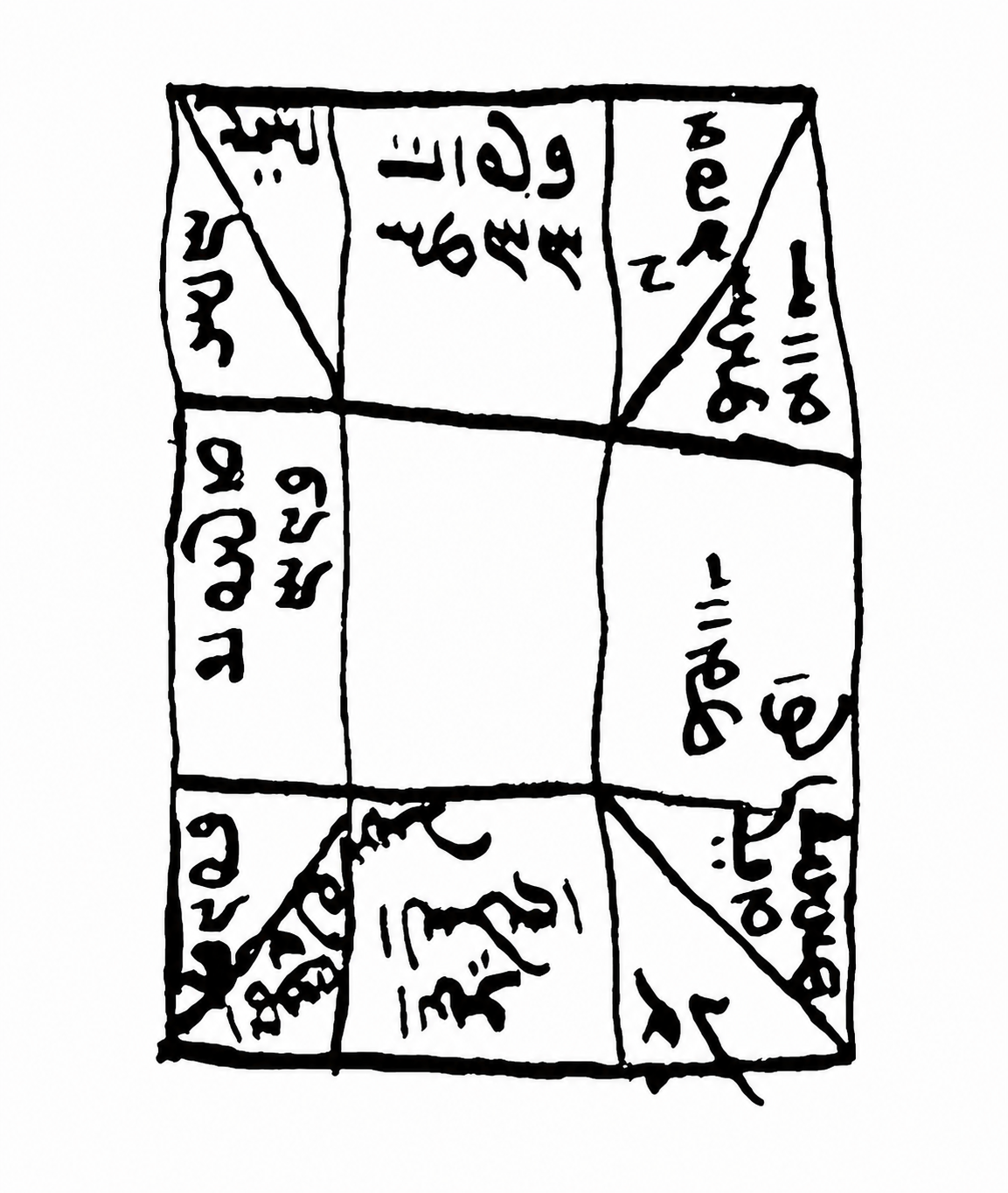
- Zaych-e Gehan (“Horoscope of the World”), showing the astrological arrangement at the beginning of the material world in Zoroastrian cosmology.
- Affiliation: The Thirty-Three Deities, Guardians of the Days of the Month
- Abode: The heavens
- Symbols: The stars
- Day: 13th day of each month
- Number: Five
- Texts: Bundahishn, Menog-i Xrad
- Region: Iran, Central Asia
- Festivals: Tirgan, 13th day of the Fourth month (Tir)

Equivalents
- Buddhism: Four Heavenly Kings

The five celestial generals are a group of yazatas and constellations in Zoroastrianism appointed by Ohrmazd as Spahbeds (commander-in-chief) of the four cardinal directions of the first heaven and commanders of the fixed stars in each of the 4 heavenly quadrants. Tishtar, representing Sirius, commands the east, Sadwēsh, (Avestan: Satavaēsa; Antares) commands the south, Wanand (Avestan: Vanant; The star Vega) commands the west, and Haftōrang (Ursa Major) commands the north, while the polar star, called Mex-i Gāh (Peg of the Meridian), serves as the “General of Generals” over the other four.

Ohrmazd created all material creatures with fixed stations, arrayed like battalions in an army before battle, so that during the period of Mixture (Ahriman's invasion of good creation), they should oppose and deliver creation from their designated nemeses. After having created a sphere between heaven and earth, Ohrmazd placed the sun, moon and the stars on it, and in particular the 12 constellations of the Lamb, Ox, Two Pictures, Crab, Lion, Spica, Balance, Scorpion, Centaur, Goat, Pail and the Fish, divided into subdivisions known lunar mansions. For each of these constellations he made some 6,480,000-odd stars, known as the "fixed stars" (Akhtar), apart from innumerable others, to assist them in their great fight. And it was over these fixed stars that Ohrmazd appointed the four generals, and the general of generals over them. The sphere of the fixed stars was arranged like a spinning wheel so that during the period of Mixture the stars could begin revolving, with yet another sphere of the "Unmixable Stars" placed on top of them to repel Ahriman in battle.

Within this conflict, the planets were portrayed as “distributors of harm”, diverting well-being (Nikih) intended for the righteous, although the beneficent luminaries and their opponents could sometimes restrain their influence and each of the celestial generals was known as the arch-nemesis of one of the planets.

The four commanders were also venerated together, appearing in the Sīrōza on the thirteenth day of each Zoroastrian month, in the order Tishtar, Sadwēsh, Wanand, and Haftōrang. Their association is also reflected in a Parsi drōn service honoring Wanand, in which the consecrated bread is divided into four portions, one for each commander.

== The celestial commanders ==
=== General of generals ===
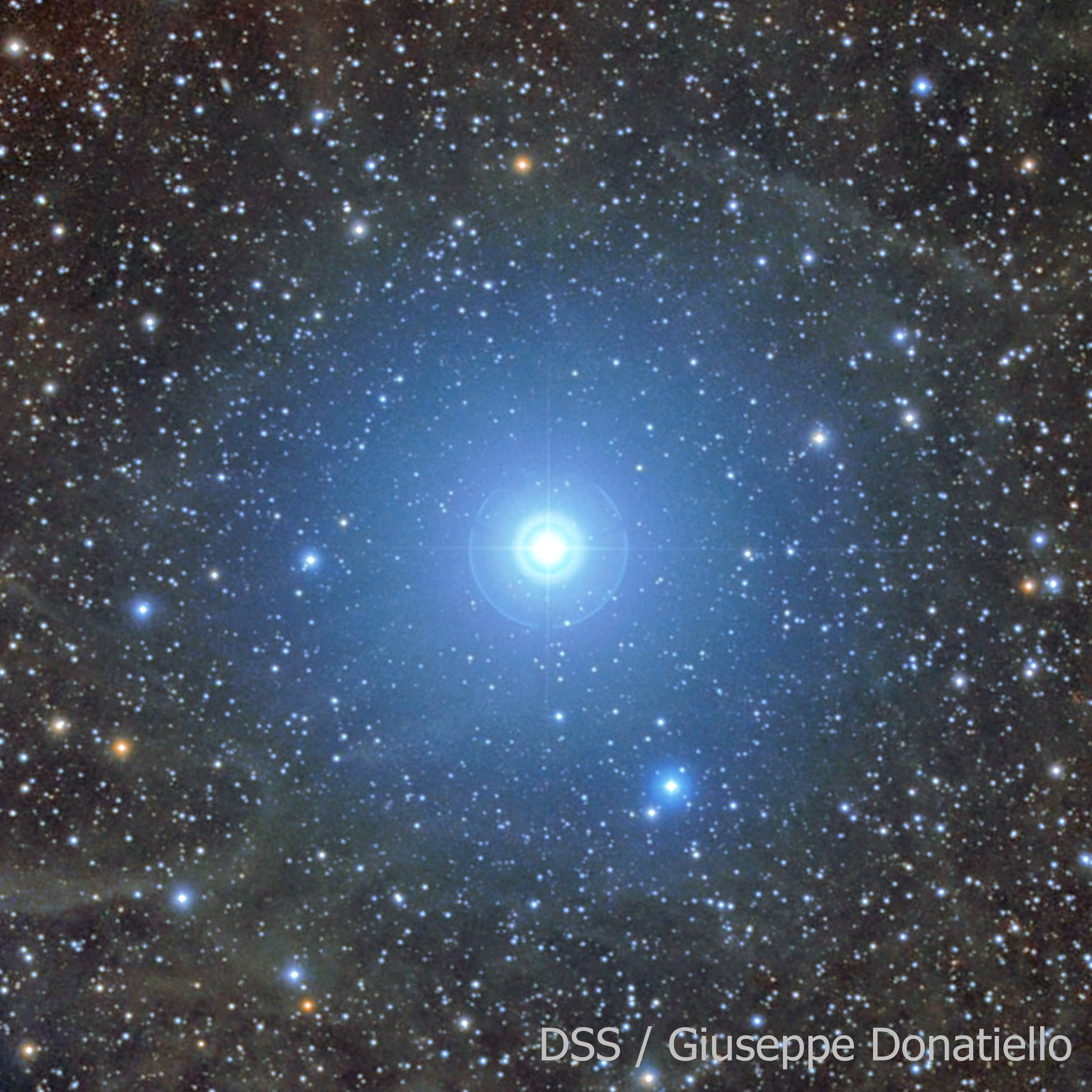
The star Polaris in the night sky

The polar star stood above the four directional commanders. Its nearly stationary position made it the commander-in-chief of the stars, with Pahlavi titles translated as “Peg of the Place”, “Peg of the Meridian”, and “Peg of Culmination”. Apart from this celestial office, it has relatively little independent mythology. Taqizadeh established the Pahlavi readings Gāh and Mex-i Gāh for the star. Henning distinguished these names from expressions for the zenith and nadir, including Mex ī miyān āsmān and Mex ī azēr zamīg.

A possible Avestan counterpart is mərəzu, found in Vendidad 19.42. The term has been connected with Iranian words meaning “peg” or “pivot”. In a New Persian version of the passage, Gāh is identified with the polar star. Mərəzu has also been interpreted as a dual form referring to the two celestial poles, while an alternative identification with Venus has been rejected.

=== Commander of the east ===
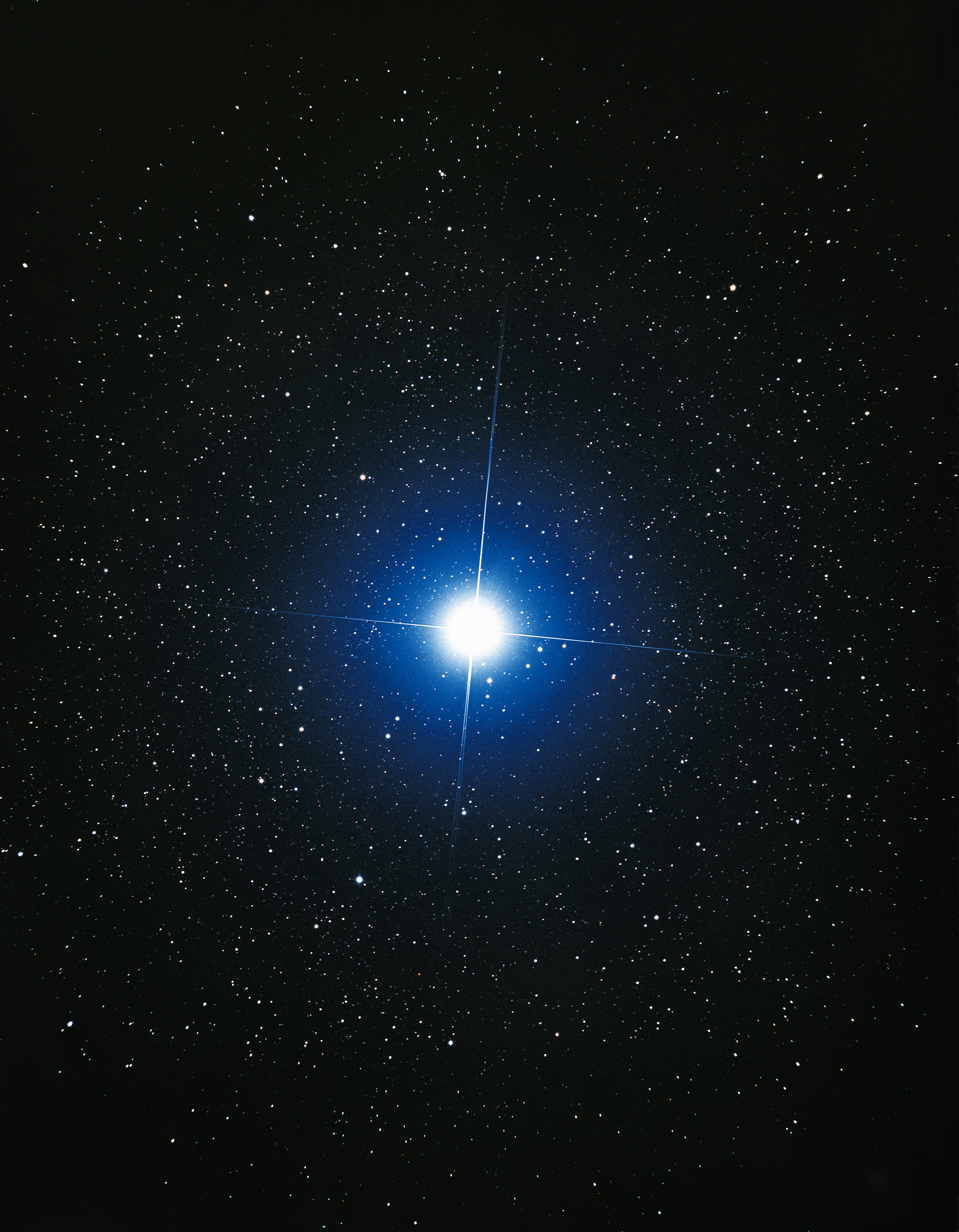
Cose-up of the star Sirius

Tishtar, personification of the star Sirius, the brightest star in the night sky, is a yazata and commands the fixed stars of the eastern quarter of the heavens as the chief adversary of the planet Mercury, The Mēnōg ī Xrad calls Tishtar the foremost star and connects its course with the prosperity and fertility of the world. Tishtar's association with the zodiacal sign Cancer, the “water-lord”, is expressed in the epithet “horse of Cancer”.

His main cosmic duty is to bring about rain from the waters of the sea Vourukasha by battling the demon Apaosha, the personification of drought. In this confrontation Tishtar takes three successive forms, remaining in each for ten days. First appearing as a fifteen-year-old man, then a bull with golden horns and finally a spelndid white horse. Beyond Apaosha, Tishtar faces other demonic threats, such as the witch Duzhyairya ("Bad Harvest"), whom he must bind “with twofold bonds and threefold bonds ... as if a thousand men were to bind one man”, or the Paris, released upon good creation by Ahriman to disrupt the regular movements of the fixed stars. These demonesses were generally interpreted as "worm stars" (stārō kərəmå) and were supported by the Jadus. Confronting them in battle every night, the Pari fall as shooting stars between heaven and earth after their defeat. Tishtar was associated and eventually merged with Tir (Mercury), derived likely from the Old Armenian god of scribes, Tiur, sharing with him religious calendar observances, both gods venerated on the thirteenth day of each month and the fourth month of the year, celebrated as the Tiragan festival, known among Iranian Zoroastrians as the "feast of Tir and Teshtar". Tiragan ranks among ancient Iran’s principal holy days and was chiefly a rain festival. Due to the Avesta comparing Tishtar's swift movements to that of an arrow, particularly the arrow of Arash, the greatest of Iranian archers, the deity became associated with arrows and archery, with Tir's name coincidentally corresponding to the Persian word "tir", meaning arrow. Tisthar appearas on Kushan coins under the name Teipo, where he, despite being an originally male god, is represented in the likeness of the Greek goddess Artemis, holding a bow and quiver.

=== Commander of the north ===
The constellation of the Great Bear

Haftōrang is the yazata identified with Ursa Major (The Great Bear), and the commander of the northern celestial quarter, or the "Abakhtar Spahbed" (lit. North general). Accompanied by 99,999 Fravahars of the righteous, he holds back an equal number of Divs, Paris and Jadus by guarding the gates of hell. Haftōrang maintains the proper movements of the constellations, while both protecting and receiving their support at the Alburz mountains. Each of its seven stars is linked by a tether to one of the seven continents, helping maintain the continents during the Mixture of good and evil when Ahriman invades the good creation. This connection gave rise to a Pahlavi explanation of its name as haft rag, “seven veins”. He is also a patron of rivers, and the sacrifice of kidneys are assigned to this deity. Haftōrang has been pitted against different planetary nemeses, namely Ohrmazd (Jupiter), Bahram (Mars), Kewan (Saturn) and Anahid (Venus). He is mentioned in the Avestan hymns and Siroza litanies, which call its stars healing, created by Ohrmazd, and endowed with khwarrah (glory).

His Young Avestan name is Haptōiriṇga-, identified in both Persian and Pahlavi traditions as Ursa Major, and while its etymology is unresolved, it likely means "having seven signs", with other disputed theories compare it with the Sanskrit liṅga, although Middle Iranian parallels may be more likely. Attempts made to identify Haftōrang with the Pleiades constellation instead have been largely rejected. In New Persian, Haftōrang bears names referring to "seven thrones", "seven stars", "seven brothers" or "Great Bear", while the Arabic-derived name "daughters of the bier" is also used.

The realm of hell which Haftōrang guards, the Avestan diaau-, may evoke an older realm of darkness beyond the created cosmos rather than simply denoting hell. After Ahriman breaches the sky during the Mixture, the movement of the stars was meant to seal and trap him within creation, with the rotation of the heavens having a similar function. Haftōrang's motion around hell then reads as the circumpolar rotation of Ursa Major, preventing Ahriman's escape and his interference with the zodiacs.

=== Commander of the west ===
The goddess Wanand on a Kushan coin

Wanand, "the Conqueror", also spelled in the Pazend form Varant, is the general of the western quarter and identified with the star Vega, brightest in the constellation Lyra, and a yazata of victory honored in Yasht 21. The name also appears as Vanand in the twentieth Sogdian lunar mansion, corresponding to the Indian Abhijit, and likewise designating the twentieth Pahlavi mansion.

In the early Kushan tradition, and likely due to associations with the goddess Nike, Wanand underwent a gender change, and was modeled after Nike as a goddess on coins issued by Huvishka. Though the trend of her shift in gender was likely a broader pattern not confined to Bactria. There, under the name Oaninda, she appears as a winged female figure, carrying a tasseled staff or trophy in her left hand and with her right hand, she holds a wreath or diadem.

Wanand guards the passes and gates of the mythical Alburz mountains, through which the sun, moon, and stars travel. She drives away divs, pairikas, and fiends so that they cannot interrupt the passage of the heavenly bodies. As a protector against demons, Wanand could also be invoked as a healer. Her hymn functions as an exorcistic formula, with a later tradition reporting that the priest Meherji Rana recited it before the emperor Akbar to end an eclipse in the sixteenth century. In another cosmological arrangement preserved in the Persian Rivāyats, Wanand occupies the eighth and outermost sky alongside four unnamed demons. The lower seven skies are assigned to Saturn, Jupiter, Mars, the Sun, Venus, Mercury, and the Moon.

=== Commander of the south ===
Artist's impression of the red supergiant star Antares

Sadwēsh, also called Satavaēsa, is the divinity commanding the southern celestial quarter associated with balance and the autumnal harvest. He assists Tishtar by distributing rainwater over the earth, a role linked to Yašt 8.9 and to a rain-making figure in the Manichaean version of the myth. Sadwēsh was an assistant to Tishtar, protecting the seas together with Haftōrang and Wanand.

Sadwēsh has been previously identified with the stars Canopus (Suhail) and Fomalhaut, but these observations have been challenged, and the Antares has been put forward as the most likely candidate, related to the sting of Scorpio and appearing in the Sogdian lunar mansion myn-Sadwes.

== See also ==
- Zoroastrian cosmology
- Worship of heavenly bodies
- Lokapala
- Astrology
