= Avestan manuscripts =

Zoroastrian religious manuscripts

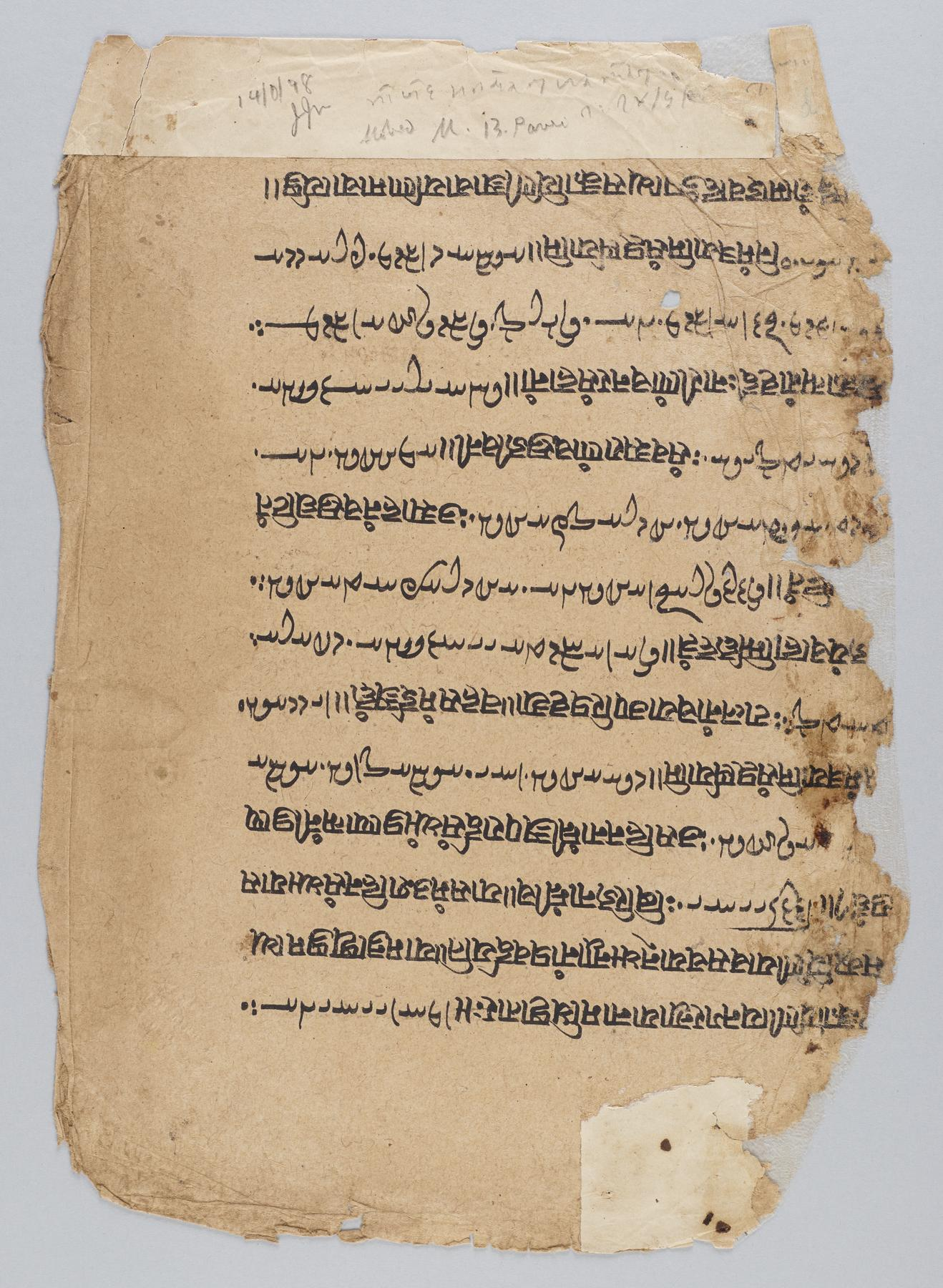
- Folie 4 (right) of the S1 Yasna with the Sanskrit translation of Neryosangh

Information
- Religion: Zoroastrianism
- Language: Avestan
- Period: 14th century-20th century

Avestan manuscripts are the only witnesses of the Avesta, the collection of religious texts of Zoroastrianism. While the texts originated in an oral culture during the Old Iranian period, the written tradition only started during the much later Sasanian Empire period. The oldest surviving manuscripts of this tradition date from the late Middle Ages.

== History ==
The individual texts of the Avesta were originally oral compositions and were produced during the Avestan period. They crystallized early on, meaning their transmission became fixed. It was not until the Sasanian period that a bespoke script was created. This led to the production of the first written Avestan documents.

The oldest extant manuscripts date from the late Middle Ages. One manuscript is dated to 1258 or 1288, but it may be a later copy. The two oldest securely dated manuscripts (J2 and L4) are from 1323. Only few manuscripts are known until the 17th century, most of which are from India. Only starting with the 18th century do a substantial number of manuscripts become available.

== Features ==
=== Construction ===
Avestan manuscripts are written on paper using iron gall ink. The Avestan text is typically written in black; translations, glosses or liturgical instructions are often written in red; and illuminations sometimes also use green. The use of iron gall ink has caused substantial ink corrosion to the paper of many of the older or less well kept manuscripts. The manuscripts themselves are all bound as codices but otherwise not standardized. Texts like the Khordeh Avesta may be rather small, whereas Vendidad manuscripts often have a large format.

=== Illumination ===
Only few Avestan manuscripts are illuminated. Most of them come from Iran and they are almost exclusively found in the Vendidad manuscripts. Since this text originated in the Sasanian Avesta, it has been speculated that this was common in other volumes of this work as well. A popular motive therein is the pomegranate tree, which is used during the Hom Stom in the Yasna liturgy. Other motives include animals like horses or birds. In addition, there are some illuminated manuscripts from India, which contain geometrical decorations.

=== Script ===
Avestan manuscripts are written in a specially designed script, namely the Avestan alphabet. It is based on the Pahlavi script, used for writing Middle Iranian languages like Middle Persian. It is unknown, when the script was created but a date toward the end of the Sasanian era is often assumed. The Avestan alphabet is a phonetic alphabet and was probably specifically created to closely capture and unify the pronunciation of Avestan texts.

== Classification ==
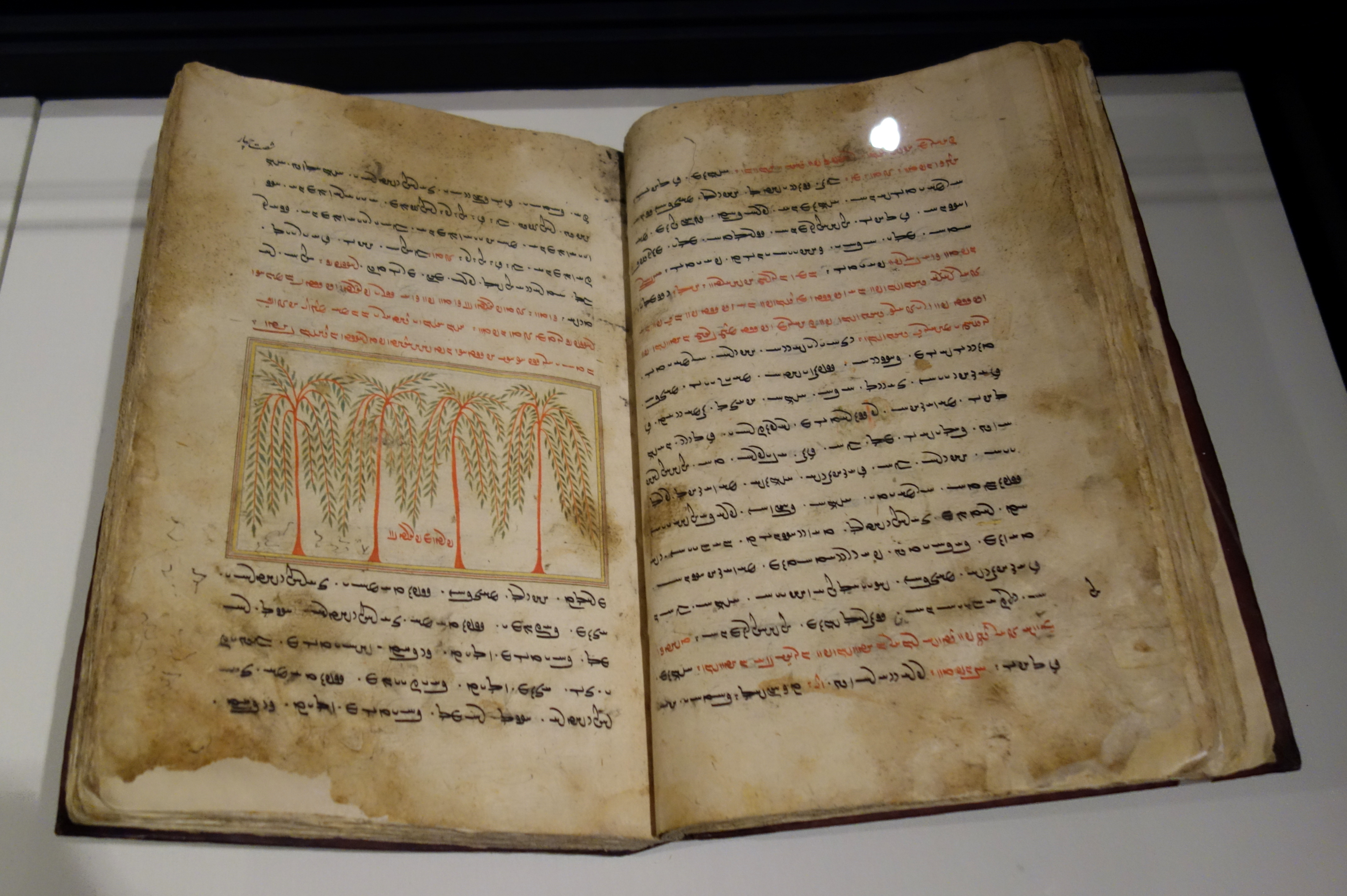
Illuminated Iranian Vendidad Sade manuscript (MS 4060/RSPA 230)

Scholars classify individual manuscripts according to a number of criteria. One criterion is whether they originated within the Iranian or Indian Zoroastrian communities. Another criterion is the liturgy, like the Yasna, Vendidad or Visperad, in which they are used. Finally, manuscripts are classified according to their use. They can either be liturgical or exegetical manuscripts. Liturgical manuscripst contain the Avestan text plus liturgical instructions. They are called Sade or Sadah, meaning pure, because they do not contain a translation. On the other hand, exegetical manuscripts contain the Avestan text jointly with a translation. Most exegetical manuscripts have a translation into Middle Persian, the written version of which is called Pahlavi. But there are also manuscripts with translations into Modern Persian, Sanskrit and Gujarati.

== Production ==
Avestan manuscripts were, and to some extent still are, produced by priestly scribes as part of their education. There are two centers of manuscript production; one in Iran, the homeland of Zoroastrianism, and the other one in India, where Zoroastrians had immigrated to escape persecution in Iran. Although all manuscript traditions go ultimately back to (Sasanian) Iran, this split has led to a pronounced difference between the two communities. Centers of Iranian manuscript production were historically in Yazd and Kerman, whereas in India they were mostly produced in Navsari, Surat and Bharuch.

== Textual criticism ==
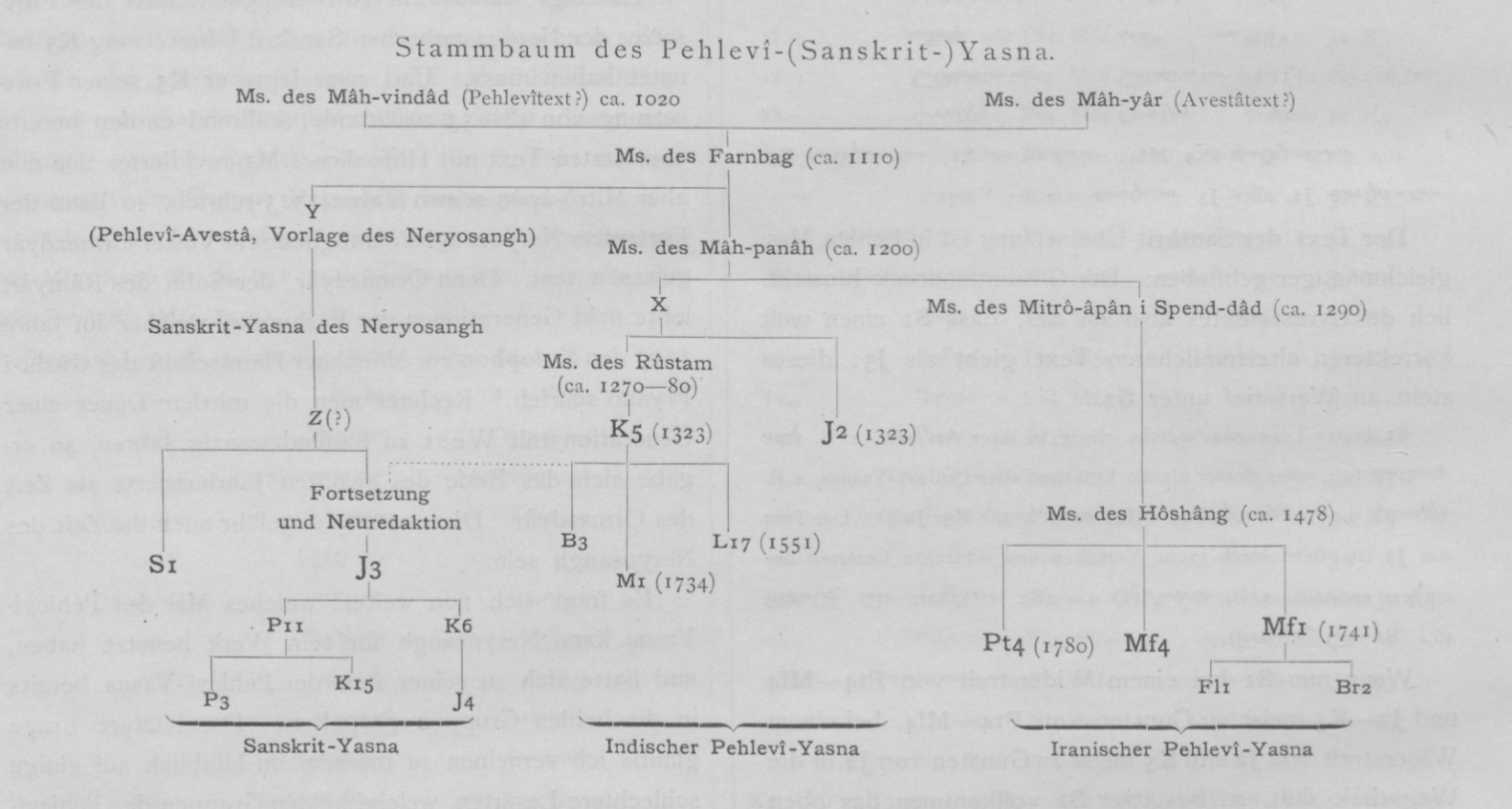
Stemmatics of the Yasna manuscripts used by Geldner with Pahlavi and Sanskrit translations

After Avestan manuscripts became known in the Western world, a number of critical editions were produced, all of which in the 19th century. The first critical two were published in 1852 by Westergaard, and in 1853–1858 by Spiegel. The most important edition, however, was published between 1886 and 1895 by Geldner. It was based on 135 manuscripts and has remained the standard critical edition until today. In the Prolegomena of his edition, Geldner also provided a critical apparatus, where he details the stemmatics of many of those manuscripts.

Since Geldner's edition, no new critical edition of the whole Avesta has been produced. There are, however, a number of editions of individual texts. In addition, Geldner's edition has a number of shortcomings which has increased the need for a new edition of the whole Avesta. A new project, which addresses this, is the Avestan Digital Archive (ADA). ADA is a digital archive, which as of 2013 has digitized already 150 manuscripts and made 80 of them available online.

== Collections ==
Today, more than 300 Avestan manuscripts are known. They are mostly kept in Indian, Iranian and Western libraries as well as private collections of Zoroastrian priestly families. In India, the largest collections are kept in the K. R. Cama Oriental Institute library in Mumbai, as well as in the Meherji Rana library in Navsari. One of the most important Western collections is the Codex Hafnienses (Copenhagen Codex), containing forty-three codices in Avestan and Middle Persian. The manuscripts were acquired by Rask and Westergaard and are now kept at the Royal Library. Other important collections are kept at the British Library in London, the Bodleian Library in Oxford and the Bavarian State Library in Munich.
