= Friedrich von Spiegel =

German orientalist (1820–1905)

Friedrich (von) Spiegel (11 July 1820 – 15 December 1905) was a German orientalist. He was one of the pioneers in the field of Iranian philology, and as such a major influence on the works of German 19th century philologist and philosopher Friedrich Nietzsche.

== Biography ==
Von Spiegel was born in Kitzingen. He studied at universities of Erlangen, Leipzig, and Bonn, and then spent five years in the libraries of Copenhagen, Paris, London, and Oxford. From 1849 to 1890, he was professor of oriental languages in the University of Erlangen. His early studies on Pali and the publication of the Kammavâkya (1841) and the Anecdota Palica (1845) did much for the knowledge of southern Buddhism. They were quickly followed by his researches on Zoroastrianism and the Avesta. The edition of the greater part of the extant Avesta, together with the Pahlavi translation (1853–1858), was followed by a German version (1852–1863), and supplemented by a commentary (1865–1869). von Spiegel published a number of Persian works, as well as grammars of the Old Persian and Old Bactrian languages. He also published several valuable linguistic and archaeological works, Die altpersischen Keilinschriften (1862), Erân (1863), Erânische Altertumskunde (1871–78), Vergleichende Grammatik der alterânischen Sprachen (1882), and Die arische Periode und ihre Zustände (1887).

Von Spiegel died on 15 December 1905 in Munich.

== Literary works ==
- Kammavâkya (Bonn, 1841)
- Anecdota palica (Leipzig, 1845)
- Kommentar über das Avesta (Leipzig, 1865–69, 2 vols.)
- Grammatik der altbaktrischen Sprache (Leipzig, 1867)
- Chrestomathia persica (Leipzig, 1845)
- Grammatik der Pârsisprache (Leipzig, 1851)
- Einleitung in die traditionellen Schriften der Parsen (Leipzig, 1856–60, 2 vols.)
- Die altpersischen Keilinschriften im Grundtext, mit Übersetzung, Grammatik und Glossar (Leipzig, 1862, 2nd ed. 1881)
- Erân, das Land zwischen dem Indus und Tigris (Berlin, 1863)
- Arische Studien (Leipzig, 1873)
- Erânischen Altertumskunde (Leipzig, 1871–78, 3 vols.)
- Vergleichende Grammatik der alterânischen Sprachen (Leipzig, 1882)
- Die arische Periode und ihre Zustände (Leipzig, 1887)
- “Beiträgen zur vergleichenden Sprachforschung,” in Zeitschrift der deutschen morgenländischen Gesellschaft
