= Herman Lommel =

German philologist

- Born: 7 July 1888; Erlangen, Germany
- Died: 13 March 1957 (aged 61); Prien am Chiemsee, Germany

Academic background
- Education: University of Göttingen
- Doctoral advisor: Jacob Wackernagel
- Other advisors: Hermann Oldenberg; Friedrich Carl Andreas

Academic work
- Discipline: Indo-European studies; Indology; Iranology
- Institutions: University of Göttingen; Goethe University Frankfurt
- Main interests: Avesta; Vedas

Herman Lommel (7 July 1885 – 5 October 1968), born Hermann Lommel, was a German Indologist and Iranologist who was Chair of Indo-European Studies at the Goethe University Frankfurt from 1917 to 1950.

== Biography ==
Herman Lommel was born in Erlangen, Germany on 7 July 1885, the son of physicist Eugen von Lommel (1837-1899). Since 1905, Lommel studied comparative philology, Indology and Iranian studies at the Ludwig-Maximilians-Universität München and the University of Göttingen under Jacob Wackernagel (Indo-European), Hermann Oldenberg (Indology) and Friedrich Carl Andreas (Iranian studies).

Lommel gained his Ph.D. at Göttingen in 1912 under the supervision of Wackernagel. He completed his habilitation at Göttingen in 1914, and subsequently lectured there. Lommel served in the German Army during World War I. From 1917 to 1950, Lommel was Chair of Indo-European Studies at the Goethe University Frankfurt. Lommel specialized in the study of Indo-Iranian languages and cultures. He was the author of notable works on the Avesta, Yasht, Yasna and Gathas, and the Rigveda. His most important work, Die Religion Zarathustras (1930), provides a survey on Zoroastrianism, and is still considered one of the best works available on the subject.

Lommel retired from Frankfurt in 1950. He died in Prien am Chiemsee, Germany on 5 October 1968.

== Selected works ==
- Studien über indogermanische Femininbildungen, Ph.D. diss., Georg-August-Universität zu Göttingen, 1911, pub. Göttingen, 1912.
- “Untersuchungen über die Metrik des jüngeren Awesta,” ZII 1, 1922, pp. 185–245; 5, 1927, pp. 1–92.
- Die Yäšt’s des Awesta, übersetzt und eingeleitet, Göttingen and Leipzig, 1927.
- Die Religion Zarathustras, nach dem Awesta dargestellt, Tübingen, 1930; repr., Hildesheim, 1971.
- Grundfragen der Allgemeinen Sprachwissenschaft, Berlin and Leipzig, 1931 (Lommel's tr. of Cours de linguistique générale, by Ferdinand de Saussure).
- “Gāthās des Zarathustra: Yasna 43-46, mit Benützung der Entwürfe von F. C. Andreas übersetzt und erklärt,” Nachrichten von der Gesellschaft der Wissenschaften zu Göttingen. New Series, 1/3, 1934, pp. 67–119.
- “Gāthās des Zarathustra: Yasna 47-51, mit Benützung der Entwürfe von F. C. Andreas übersetzt und erklärt,” Nachrichten von der Gesellschaft der Wissenschaften zu Göttingen, New Series, 1/4, 1935a, pp. 121–69.
- Die alten Arier: von Art und Adel ihrer Götter, Frankfurt, 1935b.
- “Yasna 29: Die Klage des Rindes,” ZII 10, 1935–36, pp. 96–115.
- “Yasna 32,” Wörter und Sachen 19, 1938, pp. 237–65.
- Der arische Kriegsgott, Frankfurt, 1939.
- “Yasna 34,” ZVS 67, 1942, pp. 6–26.
- Gedichte des Rig-Veda: Auswahl und Übersetzung, Munich, 1955.
- Altbrahmanische Legenden, Zürich and Stuttgart, 1964.
- Die Gathas des Zarathustra, ed. Bernfried Schlerath, Basel and Stuttgart, 1971.
- Kleine Schriften, ed. Klaus L. Janert, Wiesbaden, 1978 (with Lommel's full bibliography on pp. VII-XIX).

== See also ==
- Stig Wikander

== Sources ==
- Schmitt, Rüdiger (1 January 2000). "LOMMEL, HERMAN". Encyclopædia Iranica.
