= James Darmesteter =

Photoograph of Darmesteter by an unknown photographer

James Darmesteter (28 March 1849 – 19 October 1894) was a French author, orientalist, and antiquarian.

== Biography ==
He was born of Jewish parents at Château-Salins, in Lorraine. The family name had originated in their earlier home of Darmstadt. He was educated in Paris, where, under the guidance of Michel Bréal and Abel Bergaigne, he imbibed a love for Oriental studies, to which for a time he entirely devoted himself. In 1875, he published a thesis on the mythology of the Avesta, in which he advocated that the Persian religion of Zoroastrianism had been influenced by Judaism (and not that Zoroastrianism influenced Judaism as many scholars said). In 1877 became teacher of Persian language at the École des Hautes Études. He continued his research with his Études iraniennes (1883).

In 1887, he published a complete translation of the Zend-Avesta (the complete extant Avesta, with Zend referring to manuscript "commentary" from the Sasanian era), combined with historical and philological commentary of his own (Zend Avesta, 3 vols., 1892–1893) in the Annales du Musée Guimet. He also translated the Avesta for Max Müller's Sacred Books of the East series (vols. 4 and 23). He was the first scholar to translate the Zend-Avesta to English.

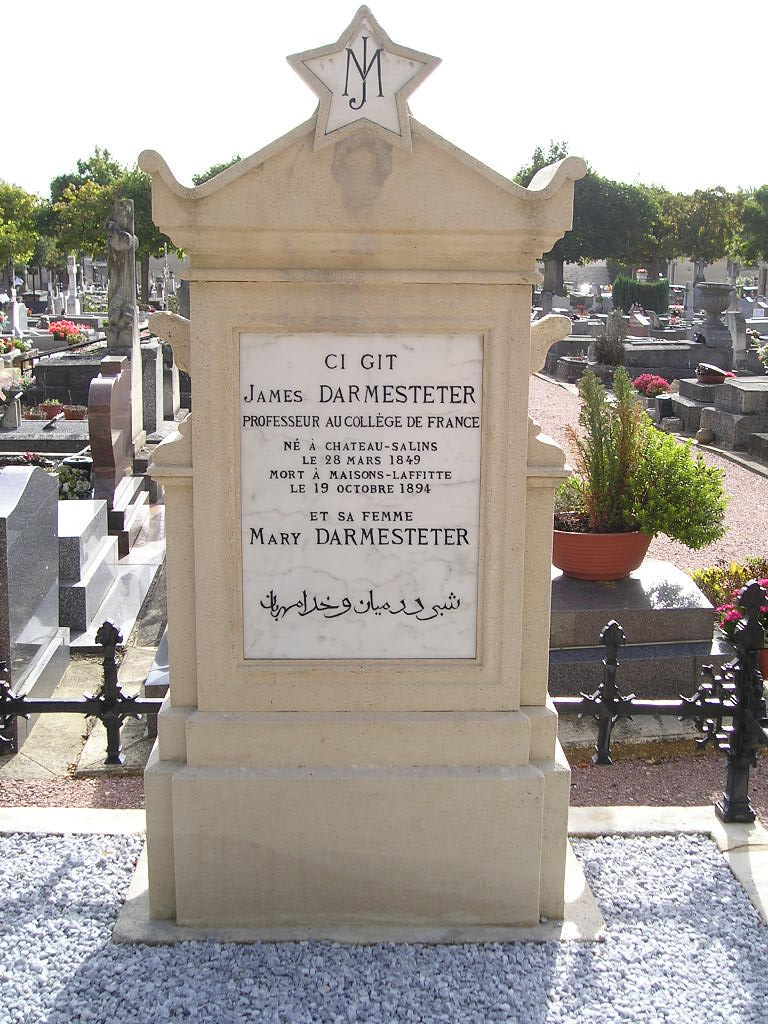
James Darmesteter's tomb

Darmesteter regarded the extant texts as far more recent than commonly believed, placing the earliest in the 1st century BC and the bulk in the 3rd century AD. In 1885 he was appointed professor in the Collège de France, and was sent to India in 1886 on a mission to collect the popular songs of the Afghans, a translation of which, with a valuable essay on the Afghan language and literature, he published on his return. His impressions of British rule in India were conveyed in Lettres sur l'Inde (1888). England interested him deeply; and his attachment to the gifted English writer, Agnes Mary Frances Robinson, whom he shortly afterwards married (and who in 1901 became the wife of Professor E. Duclaux, director of the Pasteur Institute at Paris), led him to translate her poems into French in 1888. Two years after his death a collection of excellent essays on English subjects was published in English. He also wrote Le Mahdi depuis les origines de l'Islam jusqu'a nos jours (1885); Les Origines de la poesie persane (1888); Prophètes d'Israel (1892), and other books on topics connected with the East, and from 1883 onwards drew up the annual reports of the Société Asiatique. He had just become connected with the Revue de Paris, when his delicate constitution succumbed to a slight attack of illness on 10 October 1894 at Maisons-Laffitte.

His elder brother, Arsène Darmesteter, was also a distinguished philologist and man of letters.

Further information can be found in a survey of James Darmesteter's work in the Journal asiatique (1894, vol. iv., pp. 519–534), and an obituary by Henri Cordier, with a list of his writings, in the Journal of the Royal Asiatic Society (January 1895); see also Gaston Paris, "James Darmesteter," in Penseurs et poètes (1896), (pp. 1–61).
