= Staota Yesnya =

Zoroastrian religious text

The Staota Yesnya (Avestan: 𐬯𐬙𐬀𐬊𐬙𐬀 𐬫𐬈𐬯𐬥𐬌𐬌𐬀, romanized: staōta ẏesńiia, Sacrificial Eulogy), also known as Stod Yasn, refers to the editorial arrangement of the central liturgical texts of Zoroastrianism. It contains all Old Avestan texts like the Gathas and the Yasna Haptanghaiti and may have been the original liturgy of the early Zoroastrian community.

In the Sasanian Avesta, which is now lost, the Staota Yesnya formed the Stod Yasn nask. In the extant Avesta, it is preserved in the Yasna and Visperad manuscripts and forms the central part of the respective liturgies.

== Name ==
The Staota Yesnya is called in Middle Persian sources Stod Yasn (in the Denkard) and Stod Yasht (in the Rivayats). The first part of the term is derived from Avestan 𐬯𐬙𐬀𐬋𐬙𐬀𐬭 (staōtar, praiser, laudator), whereas the second term is connected to Avestan 𐬪𐬈𐬯𐬦𐬌𐬌𐬀 (ẏesńiia, worthy of sacrifice). The name can therefore be translated as Sacrificial Eulogy or Praise Ritual.

== In the Sasanian Avesta ==
The Sasanian Avesta was the collection of Avestan literature produced during the Sasanian Empire. It consisted of 21 nasks (volumes), which were grouped into three divisions, namely the Gathic, manthric and legalistic nasks. Within this scheme, the Stod Yasn belonged to the Gathic group. Edward William West estimates, that it consisted of ca. 12,500 words of Avestan text accompanied by ca. 22,400 words of translation and commentary in Pahlavi.

== In the extant Avesta ==
In the extant Avesta, the Staota Yesnya forms the central part of the Yasna as well as the Visperad. However, the parts which are included differ slightly between these two. In the Yasna, the Staota Yesnya is referred to as comprising Yasna 14-58. In the Visperad, however, the Young Avestan parts before the Ahuna vairya manthra were not included.

Contents of the Staota Yesnya in the Yasna
Yasna	Name	Language
14-18	Intro to the Staota Yesnya	Young Avestan
19-21	Bagān yašt	Young Avestan
22-26	Hōmāst	Young Avestan
27.1-13	Prelude to the manthras	Young Avestan
27.14	Ahuna vairya manthra	Old Avestan
27.15	Ashem vohu manthra	Old Avestan / Pseudo Old Avestan
27.16	Yenghe hatam manthra	Pseudo Old Avestan / Middle Avestan
28-34	Ahunavaiti Gatha	Old Avestan
35-41	Yasna Haptanghaiti	Old Avestan
42	Appendix to the Yasna Haptanhaiti	Young Avestan
43-46	Ushtavait Gatha	Old Avestan
47-50	Spenta Mainyu Gatha	Old Avestan
51	Vohu Khshathra Gatha	Old Avestan
52	Hymn to Ashi	Young Avestan
53	Vahishto Ishti Gatha	Old Avestan
54	Airiieman ishya manthra	Old Avestan
55	Praise to the Gathas	Young Avestan
56	Srōš barišnīh	Young Avestan
57	Srōš Yasht	Young Avestan
58	Fshusho manthra	Middle Avestan

Almut Hintze has argued that the Staota Yesnya originally only consisted of the Old Avestan texts, i.e., the Gathas, the Yasna Haptanghaiti as well as the Ahuna vairya and Airyaman ishya manthras. According to this theory, this arrangement was the original liturgy of the early Zoroastrian community, possibly arranged by Zarathustra himself. Jean Kellens, however, has opined that the Staota Yesnya, while being indeed very old, was redacted some time later during the Young Avestan period.
