= Yasht i Visperad =

Zoroastrian religious ceremony

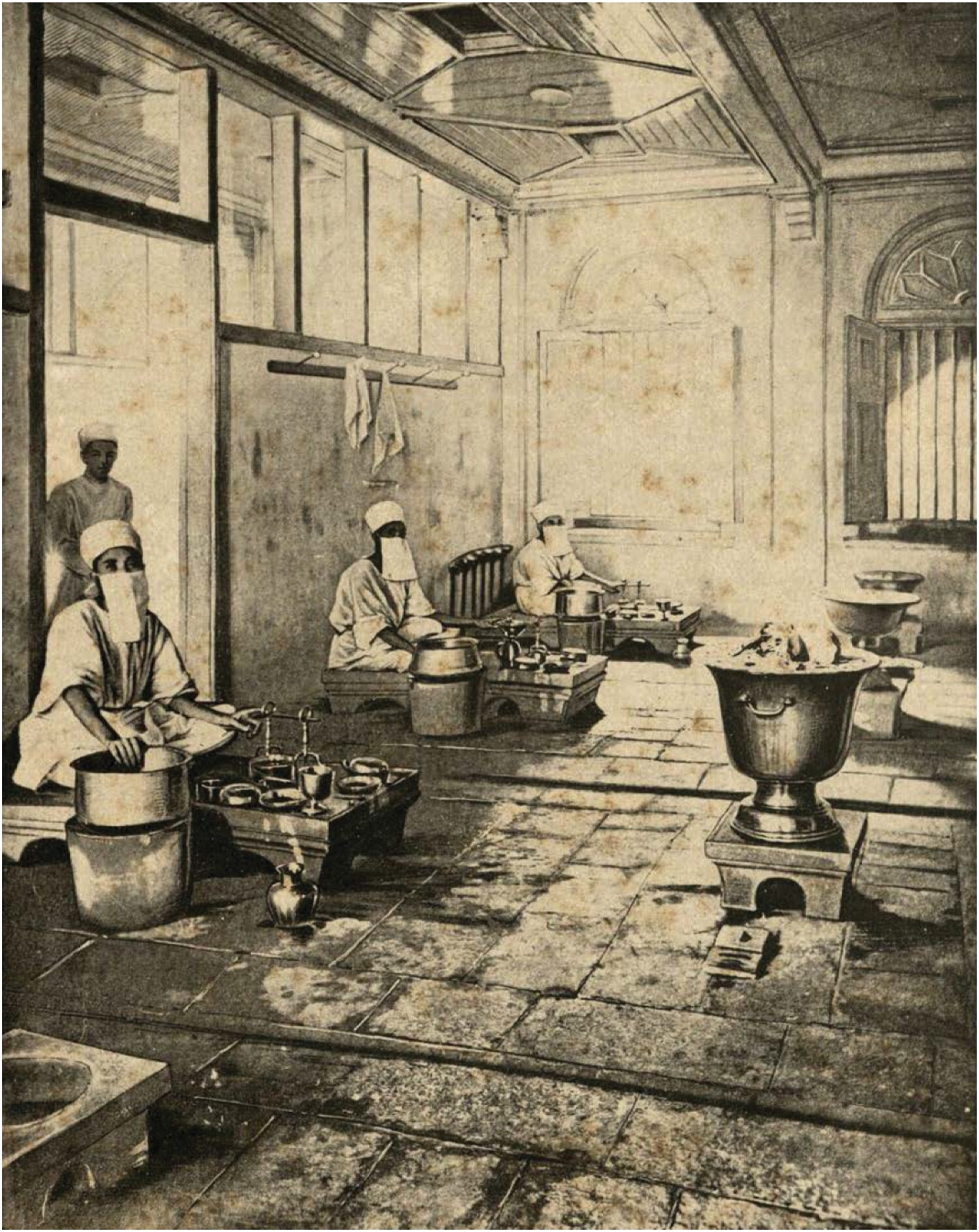
- Zoroastrian priests in the ritual precinct of Maneckji Seth Agiary fire temple in Bombay
- Genre: Long Liturgy
- Date: Havan gah
- Frequency: Seasonal

The Yasht i Visperad, or simply Visperad, is one of the main variants of the Long Liturgy, the main ritual of Zoroastrianism. It is based on the Yasna ceremony, extended by the text of the Visperad.

== Name ==
In the scholarly literature, both the text and the liturgy are called Visperad. The term in generally interpreted to mean all the ratus, i.e., a dedication to all the beneficial aspects of existence. In the Middle Persian Zoroastrian literature, however, the liturgy is called Yasht i Visperad, Yasht Visperad or Jesht i Visperad, meaning it is a Yasna ceremony (called yasht in Middle Persian) in which the text of the Visperad is used.

== History ==
Like other texts of the Avesta, the Visperad is assumed to be the product of layers of compositional and redactional work. Although, the concept of a ritual like the Visperad seems to go back to the common Indo-Iranian history, there is, e.g., no mention of such a ritual in Greek or Latin sources for the Achaemenid period. On the one hand, some scholars consider the Visperad ceremony to by a late and derivative work. Mary Boyce for instance assumes that it evolved during the Sasanian Empire, in order to accompanie the Gahambar festivals. On the other hand, scholars like Kellens have observed some contextual differences between the Yasna and Visperad, which indicates that their traditions diverged already while Avestan was still a productive language.

Textual evidence for the Visperad is first provided in the Zend of the Nerangestan, which shows that it was performed during the Sasanian Empire. During this time, it was performed by eight priests instead of only two today. Like the other variants of the Long Liturgy, the performance of the Visperad ceremony has declined rapidly in the last decades. In Iran, it is only celebrated as an outer ritual where ritual purity is not a requirement. Often there is only one priest instead of the two that are traditionally required, and the priests sit at a table with only a lamp or candle representing the fire. In India, it is only celebrated on a few special occasions, in particular the Gahambars.

== Structure ==
The Visperad ceremony has received comparably little attention in modern scholarship. This is due to the editorial editions made early on, where the Visperad text was always edited separately from the Yasna, thus, making it impossible to understand the liturgical arrangement. The first time, the Visperad was edited in its liturgical form was in a series of volumes by Kellens.

Structure of the Visperad liturgy
	Yasna	Visperad (Note: The numbering of the sections is not consistent in the manuscripts as well as different editions. The following numbering follows Geldner's edition.)
	1.1-1.8	
		1
	1.9-2.8	
		2
	2.9-11.8	
		3.1-3.5
	11.9-11.15	
		3.6-4.2
	11.17-14	
		5
	15	
		6
	16-17	
		7-8
	18-21	
		9
	22	
		Vr 10–11
	Y 23–27	
		Vr 12
Ahunavaiti Gatha I	Y 28–30	
		Vr 13
Ahunavaiti Gatha II	Y 32 - 34	
		Vr 14–15
Yasna Haptanhaiti	Y 35–42	
		Vr 16–17
Ushtavait Gatha	Y 43–46	
		Vr 18
Spenta Mainyu Gatha	Y 47–50	
		Vr 19
Vohu Khshathra Gatha	Y 51	
		Vr 20
2. Yasna Haptanhaiti		Vr 21–22
Vahishto Ishti Gatha	Y 52–53	
		Vr 23
Airiieman ishya manthra	Y 54	
		Vr 24
	Y 55–72	

The Visperad ceremony is based on the Yasna ceremony, but enlarged by the text of the Visperad. This means that its chapters, called kardes, are inserted before and during the central part of the Yasna, i.e., the Staota Yesnya. In addition to these insertions drawn from the Visperad text, the ceremony also contains a number of performative changes. One major change is the second performance of the Yasna Haptanghaiti. In current practice, this second performance is done by the raspi, i.e., the assisting priest, instead of the zot, i.e., the officiating priest. It is often slower and more melodious. No ritual action is performed during this second recitation. Another difference to the Yasna is the barsom bundle, which has 35 rods (tae), compared to the regular 21. A comprehensive list of all differences between the Yasna and Visperad ceremony is provided by Cantera.

== Liturgical use ==
=== Gahambar ni Visperad ===
The Gahambars are the festivals celebrated at the end of the six seasons of the Zoroastrian year. The Visperad ceremony performed during a Gahambar is known as Gahambar ni Visperad. It is celebrated during the Havan gah, i.e., between sunrise and noon. The Visperad has a strong connection to the Gahambars and scholars like Boyce and Malandra assume that it was specifically composed to be performed on these occasions.

=== Intercalation ceremonies ===
The Visperad liturgy forms the basis for the so-called intercalation ceremonies, where additional texts are inserted during the central part of the ceremony, i.e., the Staota Yesnya.These insertions are made in nine different places, precisely as indicated in the Visperad. Currently, only one of these ceremonies is still performed, namely the Yasht i Visperad abag Videvdad, or Videvdad for short, in which the text of the Videvdad is inserted. Another ceremony, no longer celebrated, is still attested in the manuscripts, namely the Vishtasp Yasht. In this ceremony, the text of the Vishtasp Sast is inserted. More such ceremonies have once existed and are mentioned in the Nerangestan.

=== Visperad i Do Homast ===
The Visperad i Do Homast was a variant of the Visperad ceremony, where a second Homast was performed after the Yasna Hapanghaiti, hence the name. Although it is no longer performed it can be reconstructed based on a number of liturgical manuscripts, which have survived, as well as a lengthy description given in the Nerangestan. According to these texts, the Do Homast differs from a regular Visperad not only by a second Homast but also a number of minor details. Examples are the number of Barsom twigs (70 instead of 35) or the proportion of water and milk in the Haoma preparation (6:2 instead of 4:2). A reconstruction of the liturgy is provided by Cantera.
