= Gathas =

Sacred hymns of Zoroastrianism

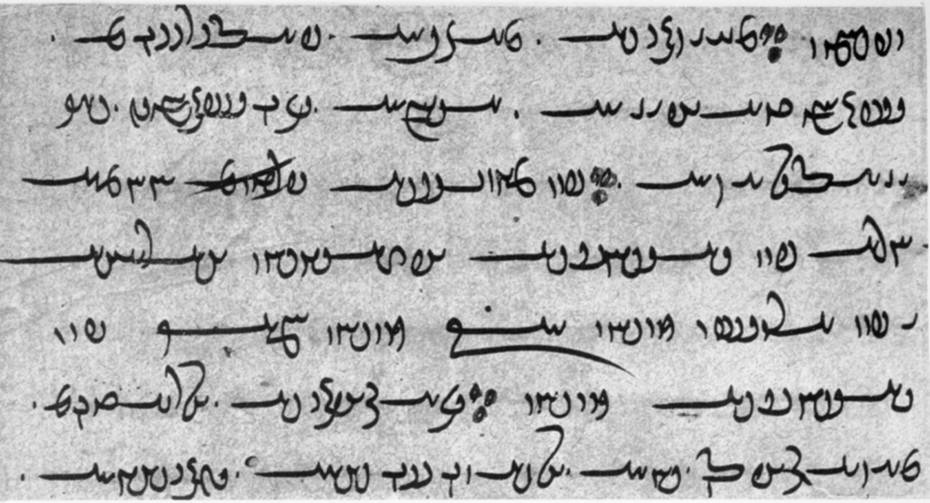
- Ahunavaiti Gatha (Y 28.1, Bodleian MS J2)

Information
- Religion: Zoroastrianism
- Author: Attributed to Zarathustra
- Language: Old Avestan
- Period: Old Avestan period (c. 1500–900 BCE) (Note: Modern scholarship considers a timeframe ranging from 1500 BCE to 900 BCE to be plausible, with a date around 1000 BCE considered the most likely: Daniel c. 1500–900 BCE, de Jong c. 1000 BCE, Foltz c. 1500–900 BCE, Grenet c. 1500–1200 BCE, Kellens c. 1000 BCE, Hale before 1000 BCE, Hintze c. 1500–1000 BCE, Kreyenbroek c. 1200-1000 BCE, Malandra c. 1100–900 BCE, Schmitt c. 1000 BCE, Skjærvø c. 1500–1000 BCE.)
- Chapters: 5
- Verses: 897

Full text
- The Gathas at English Wikisource

The Gathas (/ˈɡɑːtəz, -tɑːz/) are the central texts of Zoroastrianism, often attributed to Zarathushtra himself. They are composed in Old or Gathic Avestan and represent the oldest attestation of an Iranian language, as well as one of the oldest remnants of Indo-European literature.

== Name ==
Avestan gatha (𐬔𐬁𐬚𐬁) is variously translated as song, hymn, verse or poem. Transliterations from the Avestan script into the Latin script include gāthā, gāθā and gāϑā. The word is cognate with Sanskrit gatha (गाथा), and both go back to a reconstructed Proto-Indo-Iranian *gaHtʰás, song, itself derived from the root *geH-, to sing. The term appears in Middle Persian as gāh (plural gāhān).

== Overview ==
The Gathas comprise five distinct texts or poems, which are further subdivided into seventeen hymns. Each of these hymns forms a so called haiti, an Avestan term meaning section. Combined, these five poems consist of 238 stanzas and 897 verses. Jointly with the Yasna Haptanghaiti - which is composed in the same archaic dialect - they have 5567 words.

There are no Avestan manuscripts which contain the Gathas alone. Instead they are extant through manuscripts containing the liturgies in which they are recited. The most important of these liturgies is the Yasna liturgy and modern editions therefore specify an individual chapter and verse using the respective parts of the Yasna.

The Gathas as they appear in the Old Avestan core of the Yasna
Yasna	Gathas	Language	Haiti	Meter
27.14 - Ahuna vairya		Old Avestan		3(7||9)
27.15 - Ashem vohu		Old Avestan / Pseudo Old Avestan		-
27.16 - Yenghe hatam		Pseudo Old Avestan / Middle Avestan		-
28-34	Ahunavaiti	Old Avestan	7	3(7||9)
35-41 - Yasna Haptanghaiti		Old Avestan	7	-
42		Young Avestan	1	-
43-46	Ushtavaiti	Old Avestan	4	5(4||7)
47-50	Spentamainyu	Old Avestan	4	4(4||7)
51	Vohukhshathra	Old Avestan	1	3(7||7)
52 - Hymn to Ashi		Young Avestan	1	-
53	Vahishtoishti	Old Avestan	1	2(7||5)+2(7||7||5)
54 - Airiieman ishya		Old Avestan	1	2(7||5)+2(7||7||5)

The five gathas, as they appear in the Yasna, are the Ahunavaiti Gatha (Y 28-34), the Ushtavaiti Gatha (Y 43-46), the Spentamainyu Gatha (Y 47-50), the Vohukhshathra Gatha (Y 51) and the Vahishtoishti Gatha (Y 53). With the exception of the first gatha, their names are derived from the first words of their respective first verse. However, the name of the Ahunavaiti Gatha is derived from the first words of the Ahuna vairya manthra. Since the Ahuna vairya is composed in the same archaic dialect and has the same poetic meter as the Ahunavaiti Gatha, it has been argued that it was originally its first stanza. The same is true for the Airiieman ishya manthra with respect to the Vahishtoishti Gatha and it has likewise been argued that this was originally its last stanza. If so, this editorial separation must have happened after each gatha got its name, but before the Ashem vohu and Yenghe hatam manthras were inserted.

== History ==
=== Authorship ===
Already in the Avesta, Zarathustra is connected to the Gathas. He is the person most often named in them, and the Young Avestan texts describe him reciting them. This connection became stronger when 19th century scholarship established that the Gathas are linguistically more archaic than the bulk of the Avestan corpus. Starting with Haug, this was interpreted such that only the Gathas can be regarded as the authentic work of Zarathustra. After it was established that the Yasna Haptanghaiti is linguistically as old as the Gathas, Zarathustra was also considered as their author. More recently, Kellens and Skjærvø have strongly argued against the authorship of Zarathustra based on how he is presented in these texts. The traditional opinion has been reaffirmed, e.g., by Humbach and Hintze, and, as a result, there is currently no consensus on this question.

=== Time and place of composition ===
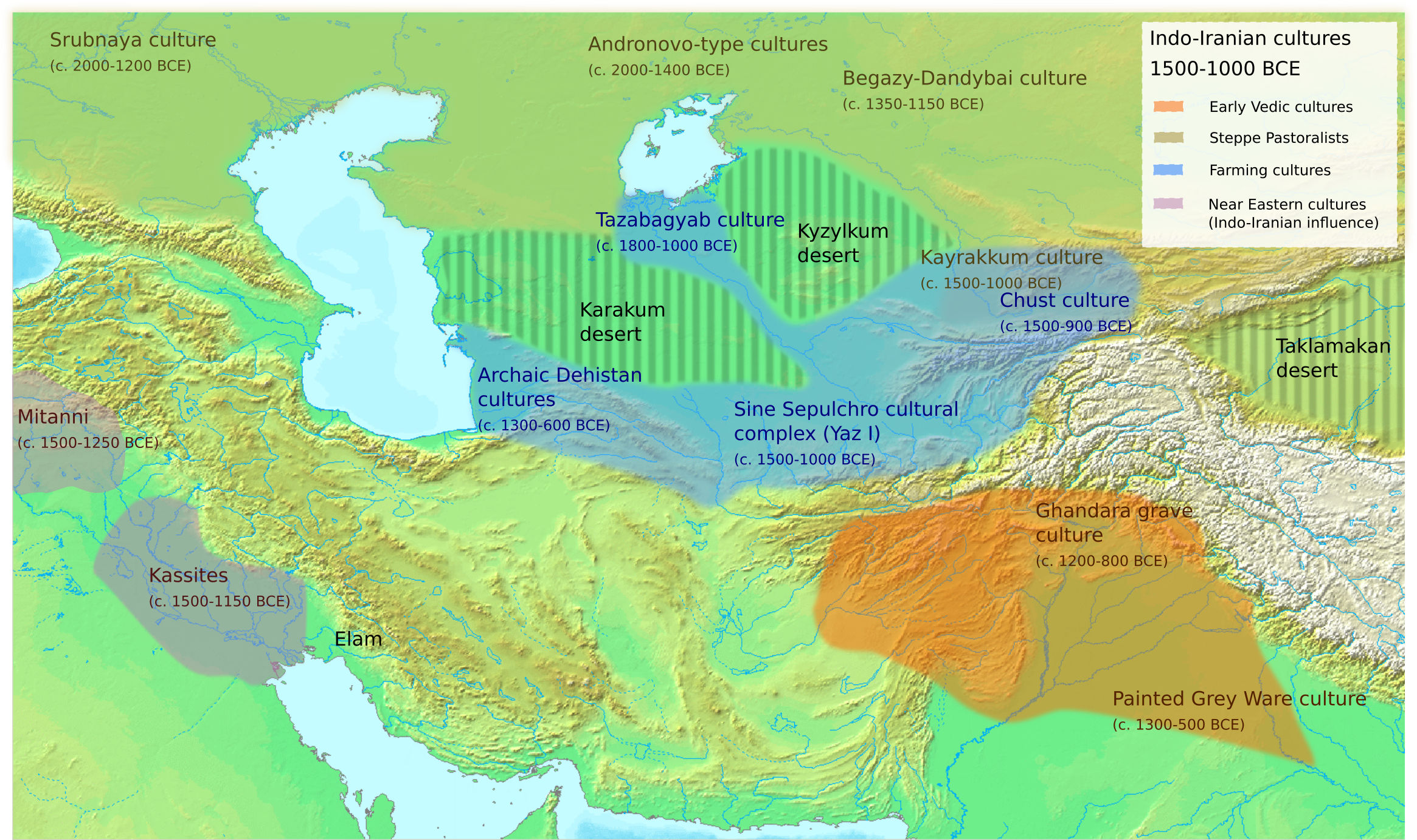
Archeological cultures associated with Indo-Iranian migrations during the possible time frame of the Old Avestan texts (c. 1500-900 BCE)

The Gathas do not contain any information which could connect them or Zarathustra's life to any events from known history. According to the Zoroastrian tradition, Zarathustra lived in the 6th century BCE and many scholars have historically accepted this dating. In the last decades, however, this date was gradually abandoned in favor of a much earlier dating. Today, many accept a date close to 1000 BCE as the most likely, while some consider a wider range, possibly as early as 1500 BCE.

The Young Avestan texts - separated from the Gathas by several centuries - contain recognizable locations which place them in the eastern parts of Greater Iran, centered around modern-day Afghanistan and Tajikistan. In contrast, the Old Avestan texts do not contain any such references and can, therefore, not be localized on such grounds. Later Zoroastrian texts cite Airyanem Vaejah as the birthplace of its tradition, but extracting reliable historical information remains elusive.

The internal evidence of the Gathas describe a rather simple society, with nomadic pastoralism being the primary economic activity. In addition, the abundance of hippophoric and camelophoric names in the Gathas show the importance of the horse and the Bactrian camel. Combined with the archaic linguistic nature of the texts, modern scholarship connects the Gathas to the historical movement of Iranian tribes into Southern Central Asia and eventually onto the Iranian plateau sometime in the mid to end of the 2nd millennium BCE.

=== Transmission ===
Due to their archaic linguistic stage, it is clear that the Old Avestan texts, like the Gathas and the Yasna Haptanghaiti, were fixed long before the Young Avestan material. This means that each new generation of priests memorized them by rote, and the Young Avestan texts themselves contain a number of passages referring to such memorization techniques. Despite their long history, the Gathic texts were preserved with high accuracy.

It is unknown when and why the linguistic crystallization of the Gathas happened. However, an analysis of the Young Avestan texts, in which the Old Avestan material is embedded, shows that already during the Young Avestan period, the number and arrangement of the Gathas was the same as it is today. Only after a long oral transmission did a written transmission begin with the invention of the Avestan alphabet during the Sasanian period.

== Liturgical arrangement ==
The Gathas are recited during the daily Yasna liturgy and the more solemn Visperad liturgy. In the Yasna liturgy, the Gathas are embedded within its central part, namely the Staota Yesnya. They are arranged with a number of other texts, which are linguistically as old as the Gathas. These are the Yasna Haptanghaiti ("seven-chapter Yasna", chapters 35–41) as well as the Ahuna vairya and the Airiieman ishya manthras. Others, like the Ashem vohu and the Yenghe hatam manthras are linguistically ambiguous, whereas the other texts are in Young Avestan, and therefore much later additions.

In the Visperad liturgy, the Old Avestan texts follow a similar arrangement but are editorially interrupted by the chapters of the Visperad. These chapters demarcate also the insertion points for the so called ham.parshti liturgies, which are extension of the Visperad liturgy. Only two such liturgies are still attested in the manuscripts, namely the Videvdad and Vishtasp Yasht liturgy, where the individual chapters of the Vendidad and Vishtasp Sast, respectively, are intercalated into the Visperad. More such liturgies did exist during Sasanian times and are described in the Nerangestan.

== Poetic structure ==
Modern scholarship established early on that each of the five gathas consists of hymns with the same metrical structure. This meter consists of quantitative criteria like a fixed syllable count, verse numbers and the position of the caesura. For example, all seven hymns of the Ahunavaiti Gatha have stanzas with three verses each divided by a caesura into two half lines of 7+9 syllables, i.e., a 3(7||9) scheme. Likewise all four hymns in the Ushtavaiti Gatha have a 5(4||7) scheme, whereas the four hymns in the Spentamainyu Gatha follow the 4(4||7) structure. The 22 stanzas of the single hymn of the Vohukhshathra Gatha have a 3(7||7) structure and the nine stanzas of the Vahishtoishti Gatha follow a more complex pattern of 2(7||5)+2(7||7||5), i.e., the first two verses are different from the last two.

Whether there are additional qualitative criteria of the poetic meter used in the composition of the Gathas is a topic of ongoing research. Except for the Ahuna vairya and the Airiieman ishya manthras, no other texts with the meter of the Gathas exist within the Iranian tradition. As a result, they have been analyzed with respect to the poetic meter in the closely related Old Indic tradition of the Vedas. In particular the eleven-syllable Trishtubh meter has been used in comparison with the Ushtavaiti and the Spentamainyu Gatha since they share the syllable count and a caesura after the first four syllables. However, establishing additional qualitative similarities has remained elusive.

According to Gippert, the end of the seven-syllable half line, present in all Gathic verses, shows a tendency toward ᴗ ᴗ x, i.e., two short syllables and an anceps. Comparing this with the Trishtubh meter, he interprets this as the residual of an older Indo-European foot. This approach has been expanded by Kümmel, who proposed a number of reconstructions of Indo-European poetic meters based on the Gathic, Vedic and Greek material. Overall, he agrees with Gippert but posits a closer relationship of the Gathic meters with the Gāyatrī meter.

== Content ==
Despite the long history of Avestan studies, opinions on the precise content of the Gathas still diverge. Large parts of the text are highly debated and translations are often seen as interpretations. This is due to a number of factors. On the one hand, the Old Avestan text corpus is comparably small and, therefore, contains a large number of hapax legomena. This makes any direct translation extremely challenging. On the other hand, the original function of the Gathas, which would provide the context for their interpretation, is unknown. According to Stausberg, two different interpretative frameworks have been developed and applied by scholars to address this: (i) a theological-biographical one and (ii) a ritualistic one.

Starting with Haug, early scholarship focused on the first framework and considered the Gathas to contain Zarathustra's theological teachings in poetic form infused with biographical details from his life. One example of such a biographical interpretation is found in the Vahishtoishti Gatha, which is often read as a wedding sermon for the marriage between Zarathustra's youngest daughter Pourucista and Jamaspa of the Hvoguva clan. Overall, this framework has remained an important model for interpreting the Gathas and elucidating details of Zarathustra's life.

Beginning with Humbach, however, the Gathas were increasingly interpreted according to the ritualistic framework. In this model, the audience of the Gathas isn't Zarathustra's followers but the supreme god Mazda, and the context is his worship during the sacrificial ritual. Humbach motivated this approach by a detailed linguistic and structural comparison with the closely related Old Indic material, in particular the Indian gathas as represented in the yajnagathas (sacrificial songs) of the Brahmana literature. This ritualistic interpretation has been expanded by scholars like Kellens and Skjærvø.

Regardless of the interpretative framework being used, there is a consensus regarding some general themes expressed in the Gathas. The central figure is Mazda, the creator of everything good in the world. Zarathustra is described as the link between the faithful and Mazda, and the only human who can effectively communicate Mazda's will. Humans need these communications to properly navigate the cosmic opposition between the two principles of Asha (truth, harmony) and Druj (deception). The Gathas strongly criticize certain ritualistic practices of (unnamed) followers of Druj, and they are in particular opposed to the daevas, a group of supernatural entities who are worshiped by those opponents.

== Text ==
=== Manuscripts ===
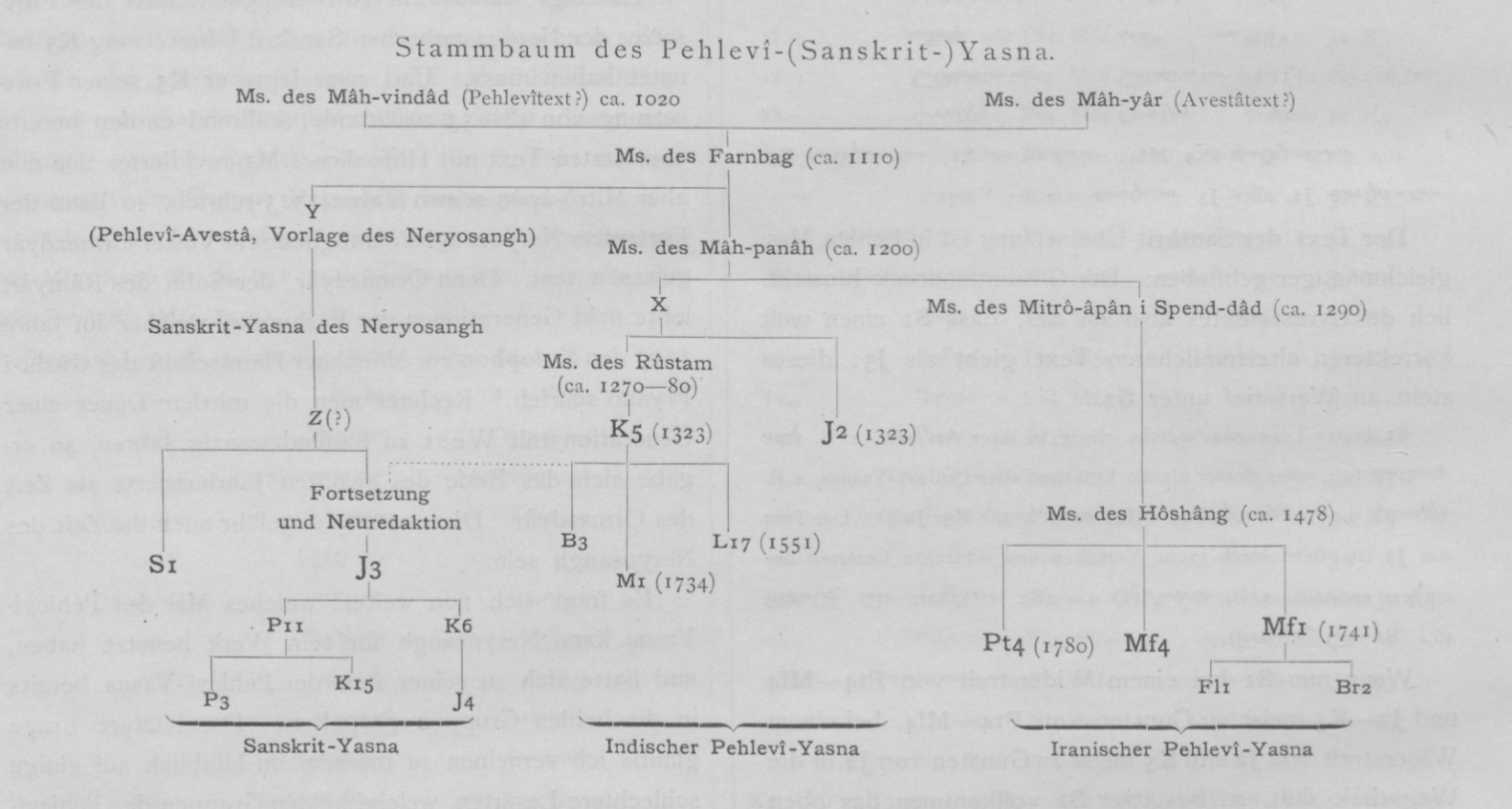
Stemmatics of the Pahlavi and Sanskrit Yasna manuscripts used by Geldner

None of the extant Avestan manuscripts contains the Gathas alone. Instead they are found in liturgical manuscripts, which contain the text of the Long Liturgies namely the Yasna, Visperad, Vendidad and Vishtasp Sast manuscripts. In addition, exegetical manuscripts of the Yasna also contain a translation jointly with the Avestan text. A recent overview of manuscripts containing the Gathas is provided by Peschl.

=== Editions ===
During the Sasanian period, the Zoroastrian priesthood produced an authoritative edition of the Avestan corpus. This Sasanian Avesta consisted of 21 volumes. The first of those volumes was the Stod Yasn, Middle Persian for Staota Yesnya, which consequently contained the five gathas.

The first modern critical edition of the Gathas was produced in 1852 by Westergaard. This edition was largely superseded by Geldner in 1885, due to the much larger number of manuscripts being used. To this day, Geldner's edition remains the reference edition of the Avestan corpus as a whole. However, a number of recent developments have increased the need for an updated edition. Starting in 2021, a multi-volume, multi-author edition of the Yasna is being published at SOAS as part of the Multimedia Yasna (MuYa) project led by Hintze. This work is ongoing but a new edition of the first three hymns of the first gatha has already been published.

=== Translations ===
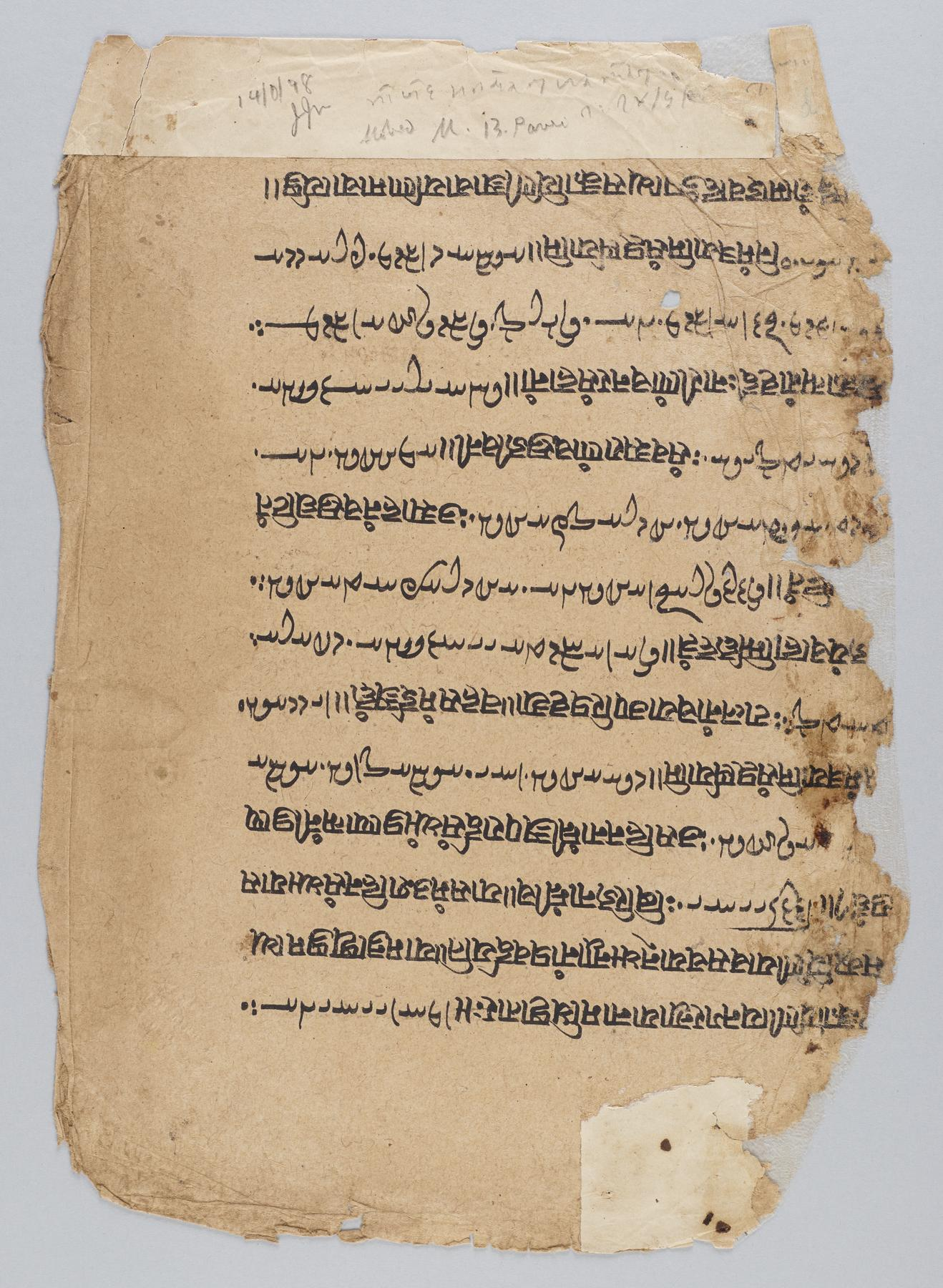
Folio of a Sanskrit Yasna manuscript with the Sanskrit translation of Neriosangh

Due to the aforementioned challenges, the Gathas are notoriously difficult to translate and any translation of them is considered to be an interpretation, i.e., it is strongly informed by what the translator considers to be their original context. Despite these challenges, they have been translated more often than any other text in the Avesta.

The oldest translations were produced by Zoroastrian priests. The Sasanian Avesta already contained a translation of all its Avestan texts into Middle Persian, the written version of which is called Pahlavi. The extant Pahlavi Yasna manuscripts contain such a Middle Persian translation, which may have originated from the Sasanian Avesta. Overall the quality of this translation is considered to be poor. In addition there are Sanskrit Yasna manuscripts, with the Sanskrit translation being produced by the Parsi scholar Neriosangh in India based on the Middle Persian translation. It is possible that translations into other Iranian languages existed as well.

The first important modern translations were done by Mills, as part of the Sacred Books of the East, and by Darmesteter, as part of his complete translation of the Avesta into French. They are based on the Middle Persian translations instead of the Avestan original, and, as a result, they are no longer considered relevant.

Around the turn of the 20th century, the field of Avestan studies was based on solid editorial and philological grounds with the publication of its two foundational works: Geldner's edition of the Avesta and Bartholomae's Altiranisches Wörterbuch. Bartholomae was also the first to use these advancements in order to provide a linguistically sound translation of the Gathas into German, with others following up with translations into English.

The postwar period saw a major innovation in Avestan studies, with Humbach's first translation of the Gathas in 1959. Humbach used strict etymological and comparative methods to establish the meaning of Gathic phrases, and during his lifetime he has produced a number of works that provide updated translations. Overall, Humbach's work is often seen as the most faithful approach to these texts.

Since Humbach, a number of other important translations have been published, which elucidate different aspects of the texts. One example is Lommel's translation, which was a decades long project and only released posthumously. Kellens and Pirart have continued the ritual approach of Humbach and interpret many Gathic passages in light of inferred ritual actions. Finally, Schwartz has employed the framework of ring composition to analyze the text.
