= Ushtavaiti Gatha =

Zoroastrian religious hymn

- ← Yasna Haptanghaiti Spentamainyu Gatha →
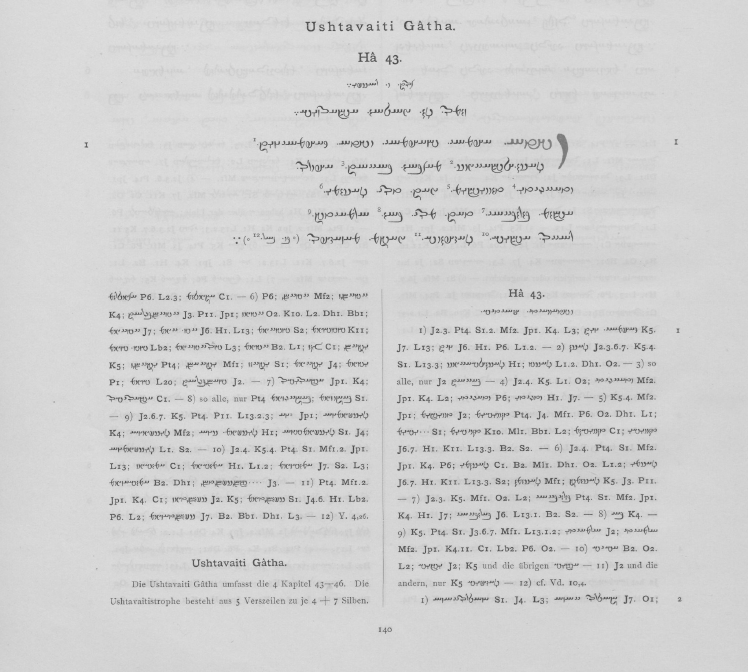
- First page of the Ushtavaiti Gatha in Geldner's edition of the Avesta

Information
- Religion: Zoroastrianism
- Author: Zarathustra
- Language: Old Avestan
- Chapters: 4
- Verses: 330

The Ushtavaiti Gatha is the second of the five Gathas, the most important texts of Zoroastrianism. It is named after ushtâ (desire), the first word of the first verse, and with 66 stanzas grouped into four songs, it is the second longest of the Gathas.

== Overview ==
The name of the Ushtavaiti Gatha, also rendered as Gāθā uštavait or Uštauuaitī Gāθā, refers to the fist word of the first verse, namely ushtâ (desire). With 330 verses it would be the longest among the Gathas according to verse count. However, each of the 300 verses of the Ahunavaiti Gatha is longer, which makes the Ushtavaiti Gatha only the second longest of all Gathic poems in terms of word count.

== Within the Yasna ==
The Ushtavaiti Gatha never appears alone in the manuscripts but within the Long Liturgies, in particular the Yasna. All Gathas are, therefore, edited as part of the wider Yasna, and its chapters and stanzas are referenced using the notation of the Yasna. Within this system, the Ushtavaiti Gatha covers chapters, called ha, 43-46 of the Yasna. It does not directly follow the first gatha, i.e., the Ahunavaiti Gatha (Y 28-34), but the Yasna Haptanghaiti (Y 35-42). It is followed by the next two gathas (Y 47-51),, which are then followed by the hymn to Ashi (Y 52) and finally by the fifth Gatha (Y 53).

== Structure ==
The Ushtavaiti Gatha consists of four hymns, each corresponding to a chapter (ha) of the Yasna. While the number of stanzas per hymn varies between 11 and 20, each stanza consist of five verses. Its first stanza (Y 43.1) is repeated at the end of each of the four has that compose it. As in the Ahunavaiti Gatha, this refrain is followed by three Ashem vohu manthras, the invocation of the ha, and a Yenghe hatam manthra. The meter of each verse is a line with eleven syllables with a caesura resulting in two half lines with four and seven syllables.

To examplify the poetic structure of the Ushtavaiti Gatha, its first stanza reads as follows:

Transliteration
ushtâ ahmâi // ýahmâi ushtâ kahmâicît
vasê-xshayãs // mazdå dâyât ahurô
utayûitî // tevîshîm gat tôi vasemî
ashem deredyâi // tat môi då ârmaitê
râyô ashîsh // vanghêush gaêm mananghô

Meter:
x x x x // x x x x ᴗ ᴗ x
x x x x // x x x x ᴗ ᴗ x
x x x x // x x x x ᴗ ᴗ x
x x x x // x x x x ᴗ ᴗ x
x x x x // x x x x ᴗ ᴗ x

Translation:
I desire that stability and strength
should come as desired, to whomsoever Ahura Mazda,
ruling as he desires may grant what is desired.
Oh right mindedness, grant me truth to keep it,
(grant me) rewards of wealth and a life of good thought.

— Yasna 43.1 (translated by Stanley Insler)

The Gathic meters have been analyzed in comparison with the Vedic metre and the meter of the Ushtavaiti Gatha shows a particular affinity to the Trishtubh meter. This comprises both the eleven-syllable verse count as well as (sometimes) a caesura after the fourth syllable. On the other hand, the Gathic verses lack a clear qualitative structure, i.e., there is no recognicable pattern of stressed vs. unstressed syllables. Gippert, however, has noted a tendency of ᴗ ᴗ x for the end of a seven-syllable half line.

== Content ==
Like the other gathas, the Ushtavaiti Gatha is composed in a very poetic style with no clearly defined narrative. Its first hmyn (Y 43) is characterized by the phrase "I realise that Thou art prosperous, O Wise Ahura." This indicates that the text is relating a meeting of Mazda and Zarathustra. The second hymn (Y 44) is characterized by the phrase "this I ask Thee, tell me plainly. O Ahura." This text is, therefore, widely regarded as relating the subsequent consulation of Mazda by Zarathustra. The third hymn (Y 45) deals with a central theme of Zoroastrianism; the opposition between good and evil and the necessity to choose the former. The last hymn (Y 46) seems to relate to events from Zarathustra's life, namely his early "search for rescue and support" and his eventual "acceptance by his patron, the nobleman Vishtaspa."
