= Airyaman =

Zoroastrian divinity, and Avestan term for "community member"

In the Avesta, airyaman (Avestan: 𐬀𐬌𐬭𐬌𐬌𐬀𐬨𐬀𐬥, romanized: a^{i}riiaman) is both an Avestan language common noun and the proper name of a Zoroastrian divinity.

The common noun is a theological and social term literally meaning "member of (the) community or tribe",^{[a]} from the ethnonym Arya. In a secondary development, the common noun became the proper name of a divinity Airyaman, who is the yazata of health and healing.^{[*]}

In Zoroastrian tradition, Avestan Airyaman is Middle Persian Erman (Ērmān).

== In scripture ==
=== In the Gathas ===
The divinity Airyaman does not appear in the Gathas, the oldest texts of Zoroastrianism and considered to have been composed by Zoroaster himself. In the few instances where the term does appear (Yasna 32.1, 33.3, 33.4, 49.7), airyaman is a common noun denoting the social division of priests.

=== In the Younger Avesta ===
According to a cosmogonical story preserved in the Vendidad, not long after Ahura Mazda had created the world, Angra Mainyu unleashed innumerable^{[g]} sicknesses upon it. In response, Ahura Mazda requested Manthra Spenta, Sraosha and Airyaman to find cures for them, promising each that he would reward them and bless them with Dahma Afriti.^{[h]} With Airyaman's assistance, Ahura Mazda then brought 10,000 plants to the earth, so providing Thraetaona with the means to cure the world of all ills (Vendidad 22.5).

Airyaman is closely associated with Asha Vahishta, the Amesha Spenta of "Best Truth" (or "Best Righteousness"). In Vendidad 20.11 and in Yasht 2 (dedicated to the seven Amesha Spentas), he is described as "following" asha, which is what Asha Vahishta is the hypostasis of. The third Yasht, which is nominally a hymn to Asha Vahishta is for the greater part a praise of the airyaman ishyo, which in Zoroastrian tradition is considered to be an invocation of the divinity Airyaman.

Like the truth/order (asha) that is preserved through the proper recitation of prayer, "Airyaman does not heal by means of herbs and drugs, medicine and surgery, but by the holy spells." Although Airyaman does not have a day-name dedication in the Zoroastrian calendar, he is invoked together with Asha Vahishta on the third day of the month (Siroza 2.3).

Airyaman's stock epithet is ishya "desirable" (Yasna 27.5, Visparad 1.8, 2.10, Vendidad 22.9, 22.19, 22.20). In other passages of the Vendidad, Airyaman is "vow-fulfilling" (11.7, 21.20 and 21.21).

== In tradition ==
According to Denkard 3.157, it is due "to the superior assistance and friendship" of Airyaman (→ MP Erman) that a physician can heal through medicinal herbs. The physician's medical skills depend on the quality of his relationship with Airyaman. In the same section, Airyaman's healing powers are said to be "hidden" or have "occult efficacy." He has the God-commanded power to cure 4,333 kinds of diseases.

The Avesta's identification of Airyaman with Asha Vahishta (→ MP Ardavahisht) is carried forward into Zoroastrian tradition. In Denkard 8.37.13, Airyaman's role as healer is even shared with Asha Vahishta: While Airyaman is responsible for corporeal health, Asha Vahishta is responsible for spiritual health.

In the eschatology of Zoroastrian tradition, "Fire and Airyaman will melt the metals that are in the mountains and hills, and they will flow over the earth like rivers. And they will make all men to pass through that molten metal and thereby make them clean." Similarly, in the Bundahishn (completed 12th century), the proper noun airyaman is an epithet of the saoshyant, an eschatological figure who brings about the final renovation of the world. Like the divinity Airyaman, the saoshyant is closely connected to Asha Vahishta.

In a Pazend nuptial hymn that continues to be recited at Zoroastrian weddings, the divinity of health is invoked as the guardian of matrimony. The doctrinal foundation of this identification is Yasna 54.1 (reiterated in the hymn), which invokes Airyaman "for the joy of the marrying couple."

In present-day Zoroastrianism, the Gathic airyaman ishyo prayer is considered to be an invocation of the divinity Airyaman.

== Scholastic issues ==
In relationship to Vedic aryaman-

The common meaning of airyaman/aryaman as "member of community" is preserved in both Avestan and Vedic sources, as in both cultures the common noun airyaman/aryaman defines "a type of social group."

However, the respective divinities do not have a common primary attribute: While the RigVedic Aryaman is apparently the "[friend^{[e]} by] hospitality,"^{[d]} Avestan Airyaman is unambiguously a divinity of healing. Attempts to explain this anomaly range from an alternative interpretation of the masculine form of the Vedic noun, for example, as "protector of aryan men," to a reinterpretation of "healing", for example, "he [i.e. Vedic Aryaman] also exists in the Avesta, under the name Airyaman, and there also is he the helper, the benefactor of man, inasmuch as he is a healing god."

Name versus Function

Zoroastrian divinities are – Airyaman being a solitary exception – hypostases of the common nouns that their names represent. Why this is not so for airyaman/Airyaman is generally accepted to be a secondary development:

One hypothesis dates the identification with healing to before the composition of the Gathic airyaman ishyo. Here, (following a well established meaning^{[b]}) "member of (the) community," is interpreted to signify a member "of the fellowship of priests (sodalis)." Accordingly, Airyaman came to be understood as the divinity of healing (and the prayer came to be considered a charm against sickness) because in antiquity priests were repositories of medicinal knowledge and "the healer among healers was he who healed by the holy WORD."^{[f]}

According to a "strict philology" methodology that relies only on etymological and grammatical evidence, the genenis of Airyaman lies in a Younger Avestan exegesis of the Gathic airyaman ishyo prayer. The proper noun was misconstrued to be an invocation of a divinity named Airyaman, who became the yazata of healing because the prayer was identified with healing (for example, eulogized in Yasna 3 as "the greatest of manthras against sickness"). While it was accepted that the Avestan common noun airyaman and Vedic aryaman- both indicate a type of social group, that 'Avestan Airyaman is a chimera ... would have been determined long ago if a Vedic divinity of this name ... had not confused the issue.'^{[c]}

== See also ==
- Aryaman
- Heros

== Notes ==
| a | Boyce explains the social term as "the members of the tribe or district—a larger community, that is, than the family or village, comprising those with whom one stands in a friendly relationship established through hospitality exchanged, or from whom hospitality may be looked for," cf. Bartholomae's Genosse.^{[e]} |
| b | Bartholomae citing Yasna 49.7, 32.1, 33.4, 33.3 notes: "Genosse uzw. priesterlicher, Angehöriger des ersten oder Priesterstandes (s. unter pištra-), 'Sodale';" |
| c | "Le dieu avestique airiiaman est une chimère. N'eût été l'aryamán védique, on l'aurait su depuis longtemps. [...] La comparison ne peut s'établir qu'entre le dieu védique aryamán- et un type de groupement social défini par l'avestique airiiaman." |
| d | In Thieme's analysis of the Rigvedasamhita, the linguist suggests that in pre-Vedic times arya- originally expressed a relationship between host and guest (that Thieme translates as Fremdling, German for "stranger"). Thieme glosses Vedic arya- with īśvara- "possessor" and arí/ári- "enemy," and these words were traced to a base ar-, well attested in Iranian in the sense of "get" and "cause to get, give" (cf. ashi). |
| e | cf. Bartholomae's Genosse, German for the like-minded, confrere, someone sharing one's own goals/objectives. |
| f | Among the three kinds of healers, the "best-healing of all healers [is] who heals with the Holy Word [manthra spenta]; he will best drive away sickness from the body of the faithful." (Vendidad 7.44) |
| g | Literally "99999," which - for the Avesta composers - is the largest representable number. Cf. the same number of Fravashis of Yasht 13. |
| h | Boyce suggests that the use of the afriti as a malediction may derive from this cosmogonical legend. (cf. Vendidad 18.11, Denkard 3.321) |

== Bibliography ==
- Bartholomae, Christian (1904), Altiranisches Wörterbuch, Strassburg: Trübner (fasc., 1979, Berlin: de Gruyter)
- Boyce, Mary (1975), The History of Zoroastrianism, vol. 1, Leiden: Brill
- Boyce, Mary (1993), "Dahma Afriti and Some Related Problems", Bulletin of the School of Oriental and African Studies, 56 (2): 209–218, doi:10.1017/S0041977X00005474, S2CID 162403128
- Carnoy, Albert J. (1917), "The Moral Deities of Iran and India and Their Origins", The American Journal of Theology, 21 (1): 58–78, doi:10.1086/479791
- Carnoy, Albert J. (1918), "The Iranian Gods of Healing", Journal of the American Oriental Society, 39, Journal of the American Oriental Society, Vol. 38: 294–307, doi:10.2307/592614, JSTOR 592614
- Vendîdâd in Darmesteter, James (1880), Müller, Max (ed.), Sacred Books of the East, vol. 4, Oxford: OUP
- Dhalla, Maneckji N. (1922), Zoroastrian Civilization, New York: OUP
- Dhalla, Maneckji N. (1938), History of Zoroastrianism, New York: OUP
- Gray, Louis H. (1926), "List of the Divine and Demonic Epithets in the Avesta", Journal of the American Oriental Society, 46, Journal of the American Oriental Society, Vol. 46: 97–153, doi:10.2307/593793, JSTOR 593793
- Kellens, Jean (1977), "Un 'ghost-God' dans la tradition zoroastrienne", Indo-Iranian Journal, 19 (1): 89–95, doi:10.1007/BF00958986
- Kellens, Jean (1995), Le pantheon de l'Avesta ancien, Wiesbaden: Reichert, ISBN 3-88226-207-9
- Moulton, James Hope (1917), The Treasure of the Magi: A Study of Modern Zoroastrianism, London: Humphrey Milford
- Thieme, Paul (1938), "Der Fremdling im Ṛgveda. Eine Studie über die Bedeutung der Worte ari, arya, aryaman und ārya", Abhandlungen für die Kunde des Morgenlandes, XXIII (2/3)
- Zaehner, Richard Charles (1940), "A Zervanite Apocalypse I", Bulletin of the School of Oriental Studies, University of London, 10 (2): 377–398, doi:10.1017/S0041977X00087577, S2CID 170841327
- Zaehner, Richard Charles (1956), Teachings of the Magi. A Compendium of Zoroastrian beliefs, London: Allen & Unwin
- Waddle, Charles W. (1909), "Miracles of Healing", The American Journal of Psychology, 20 (2): 219–268, doi:10.2307/1413297, JSTOR 1413297
