= Visperad =

Zoroastrian text within the Avesta

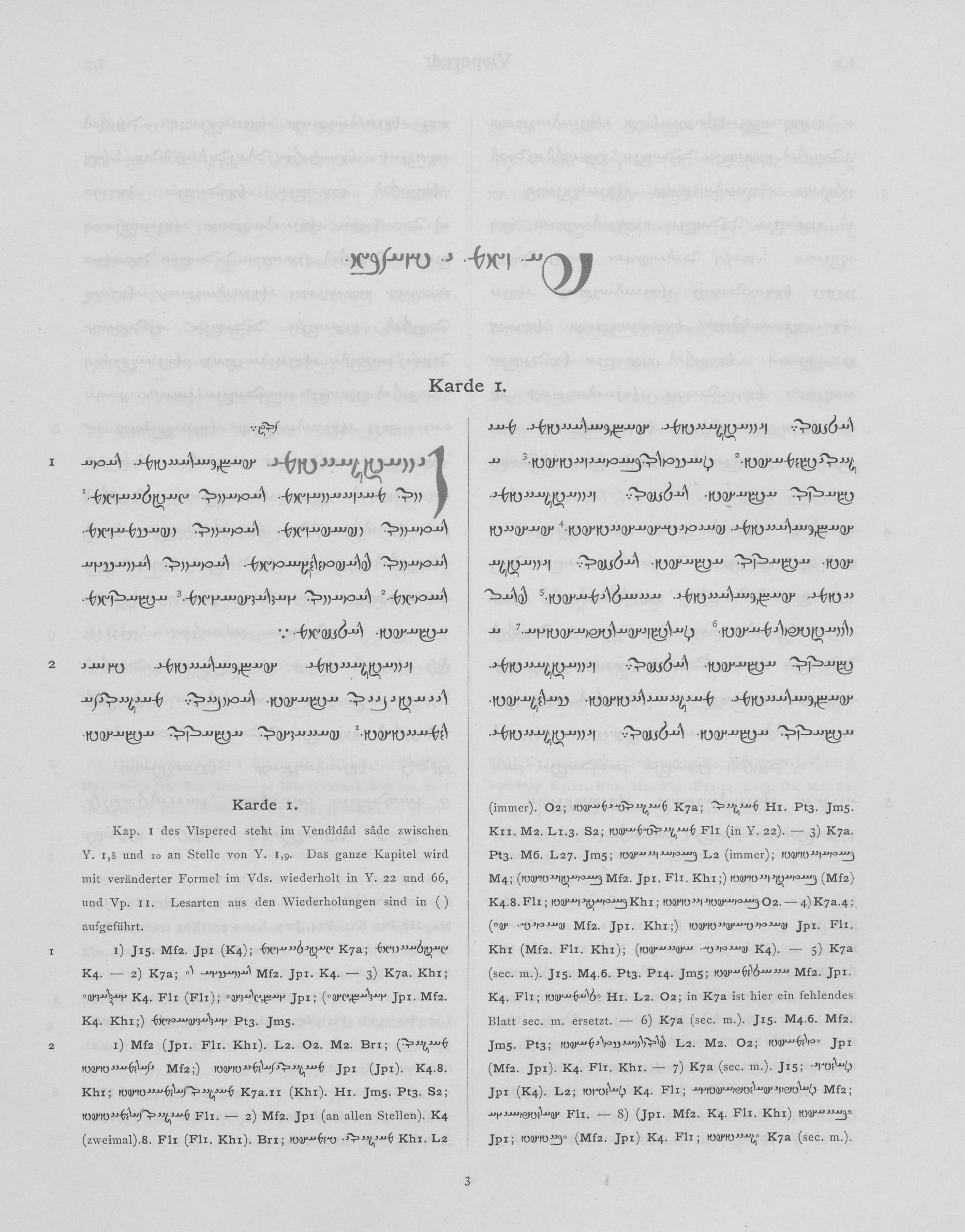
- First page of the Visperad in Geldner's edition

Information
- Religion: Zoroastrianism
- Language: Avestan
- Chapters: 24^{[a]} Kardes

The Visperad (wysplt') is one of the texts in the Avesta collection. Its 24 chapters do not have any internal unity, but are only used within the Yasht i Visperad liturgy, where they are individually inserted into the text of the Yasna.

== Name ==
The name of the text is based on Middle Persian wysplt', itself derived from Avestan vispe ratavo.^{[b]} It has been variously transliterated by scholars as Visperad, Vispered, Vispéred or Wisperad. The term itself has an ambiguous meaning. Subject to how ratu is translated,^{[c]} vispe ratavo may be translated as "(prayer to) all patrons", "all masters", or, the older and today less common, "all chiefs." or "all lords."

== Text ==
The text of the Visperad has no unity of its own, and is never recited separately from the Yasna. During the Visperad liturgy, its sections are not recited en bloc but are instead interleaved into the text of the Yasna. These supplementary sections (karda) are then – from a philological perspective – the passages that make up the Visperad. The standard abbreviation for Visperad chapter-verse pointers is Vr., though Vsp. may also appear in older sources.

The Visperad itself exalts several texts of the Yasna, including the Ahuna Vairya and the Airyaman ishya, the Gathas, and the Yasna Haptanghaiti (Visperad 13–16, 18–21, 23-24) Unlike in a regular Yasna liturgy, the Yasna Haptanghaiti is recited a second time between the 4th and 5th Gatha (the first time between the 1st and 2nd as in a standard Yasna).

== Visperad liturgy ==
The text of the Visperad is used during the Visperad liturgy, also known in Middle Persian as Yasht i Visperad or Jesht-i Visperad. This means it is a Yasna liturgy, known in Middle Persian as Yasht, which includes a worship of all the ratus. The Visperad liturgy has a strong connection to yearly Zoroastrian festivals known as Gahambars, and it may have been created as an "extended service" for that occastion.

As seasonal festivals, the gahambars are dedicated to the Amesha Spentas, the divinities that are in tradition identified with specific aspects of creation, and through whom Ahura Mazda realized ("with his thought") creation. These "bounteous immortals" (amesha spentas) are the "all patrons" – the vispe ratavo – who apportion the bounty of creation. However, the Visperad liturgy itself is dedicated to Ahura Mazda, the ratūm berezem "high Master."

== Manuscripts ==
The manuscripts of the Visperad have come to us in two different traditions. The first group comprises the actual Visperad manuscripts. Exegetical manuscripts only contain the text unique to the Visperad plus a translation into Middle Persian or Gujarati. Since the written form of Middle Persian is called Pahlavi, they are called Visperad Pahlavi or Visperad Gujarati. Visperad Pahlavi all descend from the K7 manuscript, held in the Copenhagen collection, written in 1287 by Rustam Mihirban Marzban. Liturgical manuscripts, on the other hand, contain the text as it is performed in the Visperad liturgy and therefore comprise the text of the Visperad jointly with text of the Yasna. The second group comprises the liturgical manuscripts of the Vendidad, called Venidad Sadeh. Since the Vendidad liturgy is an extension of the Visperad, these manuscripts contain the text of the Yasna, Visperad and Vendidad as they are performed in the Vendidad liturgy. A lengthy treatment of the different manuscripts is provided by Geldner and Dhabhar. A recent overview of all available Visperad manuscripts if provided by Martínez-Porro.

== Editions ==
The Visperad has been edited as part of the wider Avesta collection. The most important critical editions were provided by Westergaard, and Geldner. In 1949, Herbed Dhabhar published an edition dedicated to the Pahlavi manuscripts of the Yasna and Visperad. Despite its age, Geldner has remained the reference edition to this day. One of the drawbacks of these old editions is that they do not present the text within its liturgical context. This has been addressed more recently by Kellens who published a multi-volume edition and translation of the Yasna and Visperad with a focus on their liturgical use.

== Translations ==
Translations of the Visperad are likewise being typically published as part of translations of the whole Avesta. A first translation into English was published in 1887 within the Sacred Books of the East series, edited by Max Müller. Volume 31 of the series was dedicated to the Visperad with a translation done by Mills. In 1892 Darmesteter provided a translation of the Visperad into French, as part of his translation of the whole Avesta. In 1910, Fritz Wolff produced a translation into German.
