= Yasna Haptanghaiti =

Zoroastrian hymns

- ← Ahunavaiti Gatha Ushtavaiti Gatha →
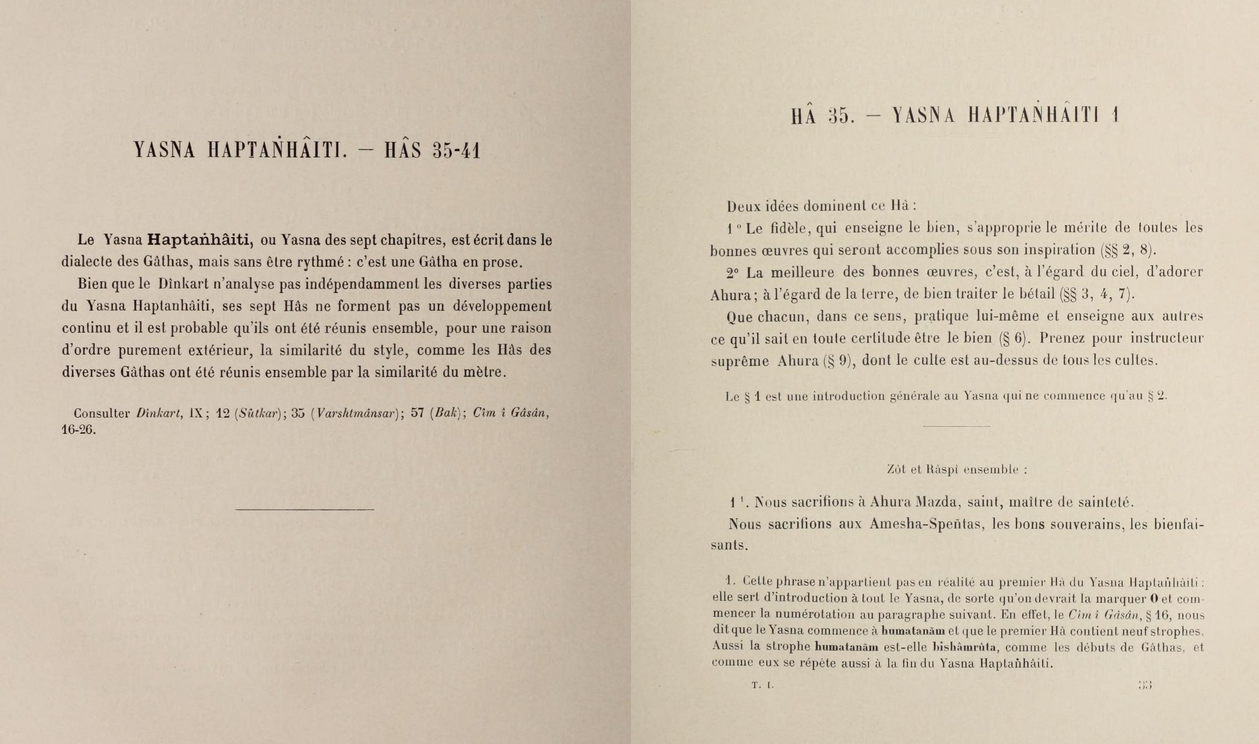
- Yasna Haptanghaiti in Darmesteter's French translation

Information
- Religion: Zoroastrianism
- Language: Old Avestan
- Period: Avestan period
- Chapters: 7

The Yasna Haptanghaiti, Avestan for "Worship in Seven Chapters," is a set of seven hymns composed in the Old Avestan language. Jointly with the Gathas, they form the central part of the Zoroastrian High Liturgies like the Yasna and Visperad Liturgy.

== Name ==
The name Yasna Haptanghaiti (Avestan: 𐬫𐬀𐬯𐬥𐬀 𐬵𐬀𐬞𐬙𐬀𐬢𐬵𐬁𐬌𐬙𐬌, yasna haptaŋhāiti) consists of three components. The first, yasna (Avestan: 𐬫𐬀𐬯𐬥𐬀), is a general Avestan term for sacrifice or worship. It is cognate with Sanskrit Yajna, with the same meaning. In modern scholarship, yasna is commonly used for the Yasna text and liturgy in which the Yasna Haptanghaiti is embedded. This is, however, a modern convention and not based on the Avestan text.

Furthermore, hapta (Avestan: 𐬵𐬀𐬞𐬙𐬀) is Avestan for seven and hāiti (Avestan: 𐬵𐬁𐬌𐬙𐬌) is Avestan for section or bundle. As a result, the name Yasna Haptanghaiti is variously translated as The Worship in Seven Chapters, Yasna of the seven chapters, Yasna des sept chapitre or Das Siebenteilige Verehrungsgebet.

== Structure and content ==
Both in the manuscripts and in liturgical practice, the Yasna Haptanghaiti never appers alone but is instead embedded within the other Old Avestan texts of the Staota Yesnya. As such, it apperas in the center of the Long Liturgies, in particular the Yasna and the Visperad liturgy. Within the Yasna liturgy, it is placed (and recited) between the first and second gatha, whereas in the Visperad liturgy, it is repeated a second time between the fourth and the last gatha.

The sections of the Yasna Haptanghaiti as they appear in the Yasna
Yasna	Content	Verses
35	Praise to Ahura and the Immortals; Prayer for the practice and diffusion of the faith	10
36	To Ahura and the Fire [i.e. Atar]	6
37	To Ahura, the holy Creation, the Fravashis of the Just [i.e. ashavan], and the Bounteous Immortals	5
38	To the earth and the sacred waters" [i.e. Zam and the Apas]	4
39	To the soul of the kine (cattle) [i.e. Gavaevodata]	5
40	Prayers for Helpers	4
41	Prayer to Ahura as the King, the Life, and the Rewarder	6

Due to its importance, modern scholarship uses the edition of the Yasna text to refer to the individual sections of the Yasna Haptanghaiti and within this notation, it covers Yasna 35-41. In the 19th century, Yasna 42 was considered to be a supplement to the Yasna Haptanghaiti, but later discussions of the text do not include it as such.

== Age and importance ==
The last verse of the last chapter suggests that the seven chapters represent the historical Yasna liturgy, around which the other chapters of the present-day Yasna were later organized. In that verse (41.6), the Yasna Haptanghaiti is personified as "the brave Yasna" and "the holy, the ritual chief." While the first two verses (i.e. Y. 35.1-2, cf. of the Yasna Haptanghaiti are in Younger Avestan, the rest of the seven hymns are in Gatha Avestan, the more archaic form of the Avestan language. The older part of the Yasna Haptanghaiti is generally considered to have been composed by the immediate disciples of Zoroaster, either during the prophet's lifetime or shortly after his death. Joanna Narten (Narten 1986) has suggested that, like the Gathas, the hymns of the Yasna Haptanghaiti were composed by Zoroaster himself, but this hypothesis has not received a significant following from the academic community.

In substance, the seven chapters are of great antiquity and contain allusions to the general (not necessarily Zoroaster-influenced) religious beliefs of the period in which Zoroaster was himself a priest. The texts are thus also of significance to scholars of religious history, and play a key role in the reconstruction of Indo-Iranian religion and for distinguishing Zoroaster's contributions from previously existing ideas and beliefs.

== Text ==
=== Manuscripts ===
None of the extant Avestan manuscripts contains the Yasna Haptanghaiti alone. Instead it is found in liturgical manuscripts, which contain the text of the Long Liturgies namely the Yasna, Visperad, Vendidad and Vishtasp Sast manuscripts. In addition, exegetical manuscripts of the Yasna also contain a translation jointly with the Avestan text. An overview of the different manuscripts containing the Yasna Haptanghaiti is provided by Hintze.

=== Editions and translations ===
Until recently, the Yasna Haptanghaiti was only included in editions wider Avesta collection. The first critical edition was provided in 1852 by Westergaard,. This edition of the Avestan cropus was largely supeceded by Geldner's edition, which has remained the most important Avesta edition to this day. Only in 1986 was a dedicated edition of the Yasna Haptanghaiti produced by Narten. In 1991, Humbach, Elfenbein and Skjaervo produced an edition of the Old Avestan texts in two volumes, which included the text plus translation as well as a commentary . In 2007, Hintze produced another edition of the text jointly with a translation and glossary.
