= Gatha (India) =

Sanskrit and Prakrit poetic verse form

Gāthā is a Sanskrit term for 'song' or 'verse', especially referring to any poetic metre which is used in legends or folklores, and is not part of the Vedas but peculiar to either Epic Sanskrit or to Prakrit. The word is originally derived from the Sanskrit/Prakrit root gai, which means 'to speak, sing, recite or extol', cognate to the Avestan term gatha.

== In Buddhism ==
The stanzas of the Prakrit dialects of Ardhamagadhi, Sauraseni and Pāli are known as gathas as opposed to shlokas and sutras of Sanskrit and dohas of Apabhramsha. Most of the Jain and Buddhist texts written in Prakrit are composed of gathas (or verses/stanzas). Thus, gatha can mean any Prakrit and Pali verses in general, or specifically the arya meter of Sanskrit; versified portions of Pāli Canon (Tipitaka) of Theravāda Buddhism are also specifically called gathas.

== See also ==
- Dhammapada
- Early Buddhist texts
- Gandhāran Buddhist texts
- Gatha Saptashati
- Jain Agamas
- Jain Prakrit
- Pāli Canon
- Vedic meter
