= Spentamainyu Gatha =

Zoroastrian religious hymn

- ← Ushtavaiti Gatha Vohukhshathra Gatha →
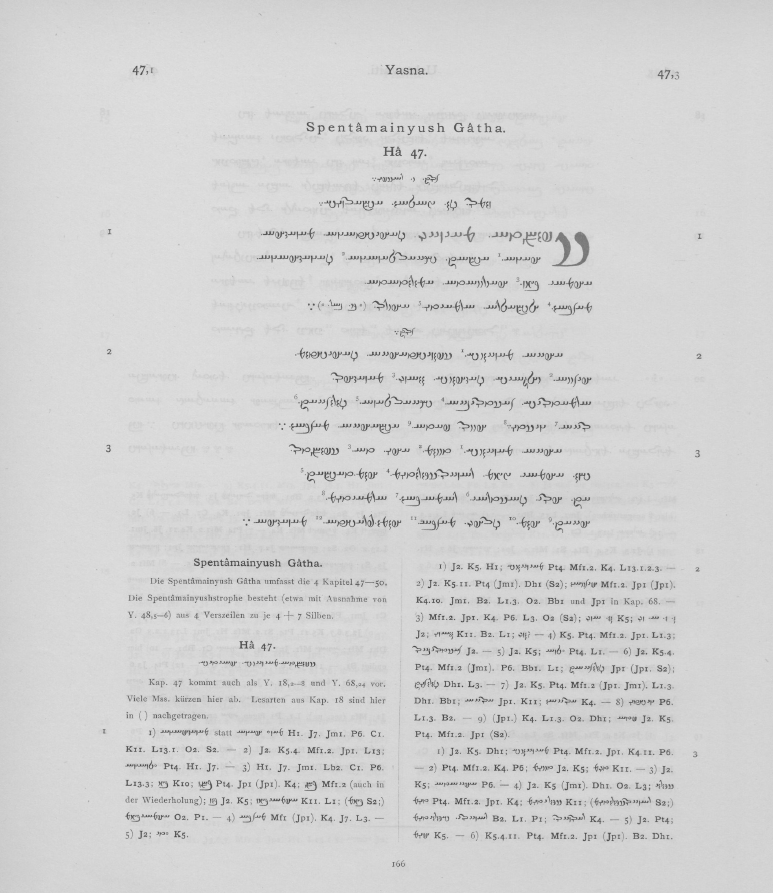
- First page of the Spentamainyu Gatha in Geldner's edition of the Avesta

Information
- Religion: Zoroastrianism
- Author: Zarathustra
- Language: Old Avestan
- Chapters: 4
- Verses: 164

The Spentamainyu Gatha is the third of the five Gathas, the most important texts of Zoroastrianism. It is named after Spenta Mainyu and with 164 verses grouped into four hymns, it is the third longest of the Gathas.

== Overview ==
The name of the Spentamainyu Gatha, also rendered as Spə̄ṇtāmańiiu Gāθā, Gāθā spə̄ntā.mainiiuš or Spentamainyush Gatha, refers to Spenta Mainyu, a supernatural entity which is either the head of the Amesha Spenta or a direct emanation of Ahura Mazda. Like most other gathas, the name is chosen from the first word of the first stanza, but Spenta Mainyu is also an important topic in the gatha itself.

Among the Gathas, the Spentamainyu Gatha is the third poem and also the third longest by number of verses. Following Geldner, the Gathas are edited as part of the wider Yasna and its chapters and stanzas are, therefore, referenced using the notation of the Yasna. Within this system, the Spentamainyu Gatha covers Yasna 47.1-50.11.

== Structure ==
The Spentamainyu Gatha covers four chapters in the Yasna, namely 47-50. They are the Spentamainyu Haiti (Y 47.1-47.6), the Yezida Haiti (Y 48.1-48.12), the At Maiayu Haiti (Y 49.1-49.12), and the Kat Moi Urva Haiti (Y 50.1-50.11). Despite the poem being divided into several sections, it is generally seen as a coherent whole.

The meter of the Spentamainyu Gatha consists of verses with eleven syllables with a caesura after the first four. Four verses form a single stanza. The first stanza reads as follows:

Transliteration
speñtâ mainyû / vahishtâcâ mananghâ
hacâ ashât / shyaothanâcâ vacanghâcâ
ahmâi dãn / haurvâtâ ameretâtâ
mazdå xshathrâ / ârmaitî ahurô

Meter:
/ x x x x / x x x x ᴗ ᴗ x /
/ x x x x / x x x x ᴗ ᴗ x /
/ x x x x / x x x x ᴗ ᴗ x /
/ x x x x / x x x x ᴗ ᴗ x /

Translation:
Through a virtuous spirit and the best thinking,
through both the action and the word befitting truth,
they shall grant completeness and immortality to Him.
The Wise One in rule is Lord through piety.

— Yasna 47.1 (translated by Stanley Insler)

Among the Gathas, the meter of the Spentamainyu Gatha shows a particular quantitative affinity to the Trishtubh metre found in the Vedas. It shares the eleven-syllable verse count as well as the caesura after the fourth syllable. Although the Gathic verses lack any qualitative structure, Gippert has noted a tendency of ᴗ ᴗ x for the end of a seven-syllable half line.

== Significance ==
The Spentamainyu Gatha is important for listing and describing some of the features of the Amesha Spenta. It may therefore have played an important role in the development of their doctrine. It also provides evidence for the social conditions during the Old Avestan times, and for the close connection between the Old Iranian poetry and the earlier Indo-Iranian poetic traditions.
