= Yenghe hatam =

Important prayer in Zoroastrianism

- ← Ashem vohu Ahunavaiti Gatha →
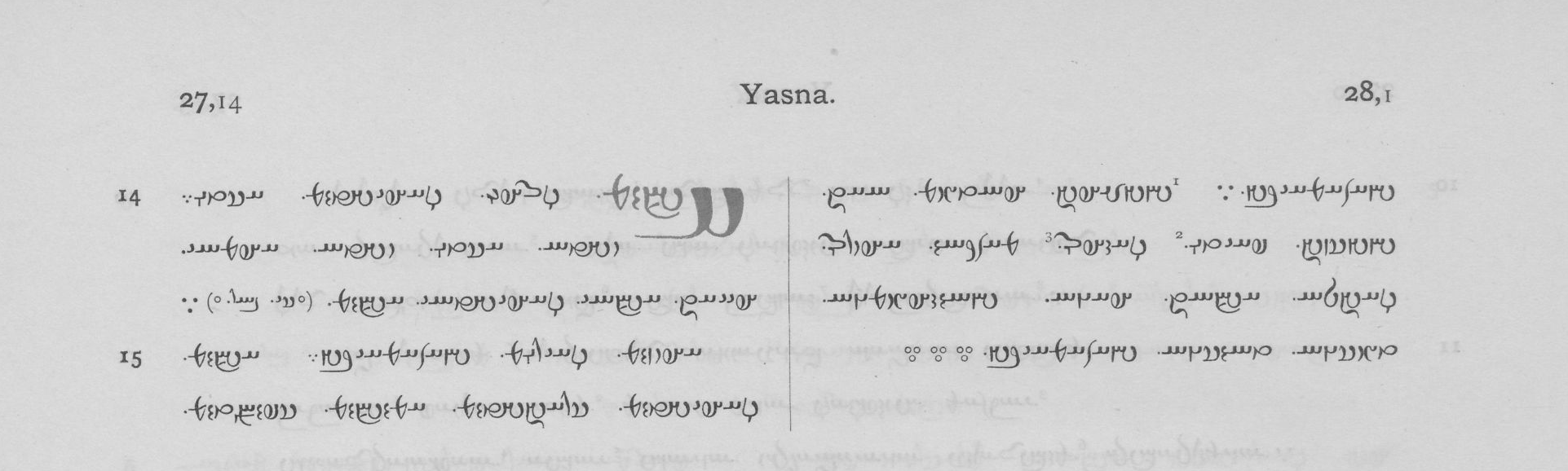
- Ashem vohu (Y 27.14) and Yenghe hatam (Y 27.15) manthra in Geldner's edition of the Avesta

Information
- Religion: Zoroastrianism
- Language: Avestan
- Period: Avestan period

The Yenghe hatam (Avestan: 𐬫𐬈𐬣𐬵𐬉 𐬵𐬁𐬙𐬅𐬨) is one of the four major manthras, and one of the most important prayers in Zoroastrianism. It is interpreted as a call to pray specifically to the Amesha Spentas, or generally to all Zoroastrian divinities.

Jointly with the Ahuna vairya, the Ashem vohu, and the Airyaman ishya; the Yenghe hatam forms the four manthras that enclose the Gathas in the Yasna and form the linguistically oldest part of the Avesta. It is furthermore found throughout many other parts of the Avesta, where it often marks the transition from one portion of the text to the next.

== Text and interpretation ==
The Yenghe hatam reads as follows

yeŋ́hē hātąm āat̰ yesnē paitī vaŋhō
mazdå ahurō vaēθā aṣ̌āt̰ hacā
yåŋhąmcā tąscā tåsca yazamaidē

A Pahlavi and Parsi Avestan translation would be:

That one (masculine or neuter singular) of the beings indeed is for worship
who Mazda Ahura knows as better according to righteousness from the female beings also
These ones (masculine) and these ones (feminine) we worship.

Starting with the early exegesis of the Yenghe hatam in the Young Avestan period, the beings (hātąm) in the first line are generally interpreted to refer to the Amesha Spentas. However, some scholars have opined that it may refer to living men and women. The latter interpretation has become more influencal in modern interpretations of the manthra.

=== Source ===
The Yenghe hatam is generally considered to have been derived from Yasna 51.22, i.e., the 22nd stanza of the Vohukhshathra Gatha. It reads as follows:

yehiiā mōi aṣ̌āt̰ hacā vahištəm yesnē paitī
vaēdā mazdā̊ ahurō yōi ā̊ŋharəcā həṇticā
tą yazāi xvāiš nāmə̄nīš pairicā jasāi vaṇtā

The main difference is to whom the worship is addressed. In the Gathic verse, the first line can be translated as "At whose sacrifice Ahura Mazda knows the best for me according to righteousness." In the Yenghe hatam, however, this is changed to "At whose of-the-beings [masc.] and of whom [fern. pl.] therefore Ahura Mazda knows the better for worship according to righteousness."

=== Language ===
The Yenghe hatam is placed within a series of texts, which are linguistically distinct from the other parts of the Avesta. These texts are the major manthras, the Gathas and the Yasna Haptanghaiti. The language in these texts is considered to be more archaic and is therefore referred to as Old Avestan vis-a-vis the Younger Avestan of the other texts. However, among these texts, the language of the Yenghe hatam has been singled out due to a number of differences. One example of this differences in the language in the Yenghe hatam is the relative pronoun yeŋ́hē (whose), which seems closer to the Young Avestan form yeŋ́he than the Old Avestan yehiiā as used in Y. 51.22.

To account for this, Karl Hoffmann has for instance labelled it pseudo-Old-Avestan. It has been argued that the manthra may have originated during the early Young Avestan period but was composed to make it appear more ancient. On the other hand, scholars like Cantera and Redard group the manthra together with a number of other texts, which, they claim form a distinct intermediate stage of Avestan. They call this variant Middle Avestan, and opine that these texts were composed chronologically between the Old and Young Avestan texts, thus representing proper Avestan during this time.

=== Authorship ===
There is no consensus on the authorship of the Yenghe hatam. According to Yasna 21, originally being the 3. fragard of the Bag nask, Zarathustra is its author. This identification has, e.g., been affirmed by scholars like Gershevitch. On the other hand, scholars like Boyce have pointed to the linguistic idiosyncrasies of the manthra and concluded that it was composed by his early followers, who used the Gathic verse Y 51.22 as a model.

== Translations ==
Like the other manthras, the Yenghe hatam can be difficult to translate due to its brevity, complex grammatical forms and poetic ambiguity. As a result, a number of different translations exist. For examples, Skjaervo translates it as follows:

Thus, he among those that are, as well as the women,
in return for whose sacrifice the better good is to be given,
him (and them) Ahura Mazdā knows
to be according to Order
to those men and those women we sacrifice.

Vazquez's liturgically inclined translation is:

They that are,
Who are of any gender,
Ahura Mazda knows through Asha of their glorious sacrifices
Thus we offer them worship!.
