= Kshatra Vairya =

Zoroastrian deity

- Guardian of Metals
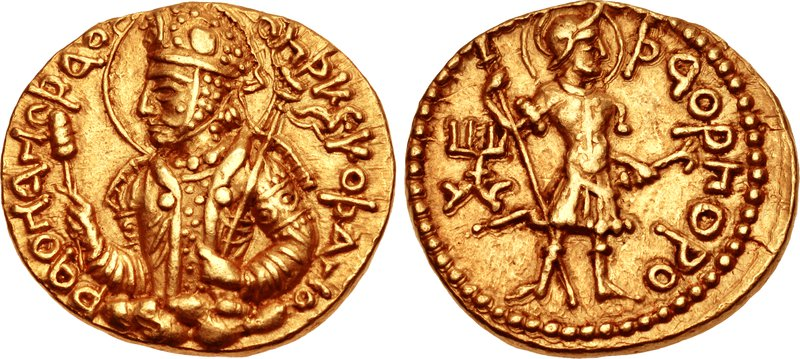
- Coinage of Kushan ruler Huvishka, with Kshatra Vairya (Bactrian script: ϷΑΟΡΗΟΡΟ, Shaoreoro) on the reverse. 150-180 CE.
- Other names: Xšaθra, Šahrewar
- Avestan: Kshatra Vairya 𐬑𐬱𐬀𐬙𐬭𐬀 𐬬𐬀𐬌𐬭𐬌𐬌𐬀
- Affiliation: The Thirty-Three Deities, Guardians of the Days of the Month, The Twelve Deities, Amesha Spenta
- Symbol: Weapons, Victory, Metals, Kingdom
- Sacred flower: Costmary
- Attributes: Sovereignty, Ahuric power, strength, guardian of the order Asha
- Enemy: Saurva
- Day: 4th of each month in the Iranian calendar
- Gender: Male
- Festivals: Shahrivargān
- Associated deities: Mithra, Verethragna, Asha Vahishta

Kshatra Vairya (Avestan: 𐬑𐬱𐬀𐬚𐬭𐬀 𐬬𐬀𐬌𐬭𐬌𐬌𐬀, romanized: xšaθra va^{i}riia; also Šahrewar Middle Persian: 𐭱𐭲𐭥𐭩𐭥𐭥, and Xšaθra 𐬑𐬱𐬀𐬚𐬭𐬀, a cognate of Sanskrit kṣatrá in the Avestan language, from Proto-Indo-Iranian kšatrám) is one of the great seven "Amesha Spenta" of Ahura Mazda in the Zoroastrian religion.

The spelling Xšaθra is used by followers of the Zoroastrian faith in a representation of the dominion of the Creator Ahura Mazda. In the cosmology of the faith, Kshathra Vairya is borne of the divine principal of Vohu Manah, from which comes the core belief of 'Good Thoughts'.

In the Gathas, Xšaθra Vairya does not have an association with a specific creation, and it is only in later texts that this Amesha Spenta is considered the guardian of metals. This anomaly is explained in modern scholarship by the fact that, in Stone Age cosmogony, the sky was considered to be the first of the creations (and thought to be of stone), but metal has no place among the creations (the bronze and Iron Ages were yet to come). This is also reflected in Zoroaster's revelation, where the sky is "of the hardest stone" (Yasna 30.5). Later, with the advent of bronze and then iron tools, this sky evolved to being of crystal, which was seen as both of stone and of metal (Yasht 13.2). In due course, Xšaθra's association with a stony firmament was eclipsed by the association with a metallic sky, and thence to metals in general. The 6th Persian month Shahrivar is named after him.
