= Vohukhshathra Gatha =

Zoroastrian religious hymn

- ← Spentamainyu Gatha Vahishtoishti Gatha →
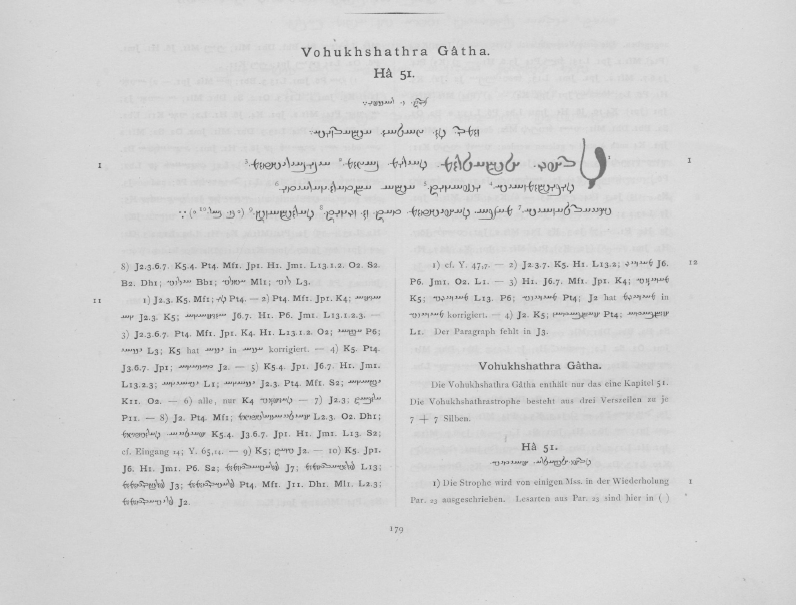
- First page of the Vohukhshathra Gatha in Geldner's edition of the Avesta

Information
- Religion: Zoroastrianism
- Author: Zarathustra
- Language: Old Avestan
- Chapters: 1
- Verses: 66

The Vohukhshathra Gatha is the fourth of the five Gathas, the most important texts of Zoroastrianism. It consists of only one hymn with 22 stanzas and 66 verses, which makes it is the second shortest poem in the collection.

== Name ==
The name of the Vohukhshathra Gatha, also rendered as Vohuxšaθrā Gāθā, Gāθā vohu.xšaθra or Vohu.xšaθrā Gāθā, is drawn from the first words of the poem vohû xshathrem. It refers to Kshatra Vairya, one of the Zoroastrian Amesha Spenta representing authority and rule.

== Structure ==
The Vohukhshathra Gatha covers chapter 51 in the Yasna. It consists of a single hymn with 22 stanzas, each having 3 verse lines. The meter of each of these three verses consits of fourteen syllables with a caesura resulting in two seven-syllable half lines. The first stanza reads as follows:

Transliteration
vohû xshathrem vairîm // bâgem aibî-bairishtem
vîdîshemnâish îzhâcît // ashâ añtare-caraitî
shyaothanâish mazdâ vahishtem // tat nê nûcît vareshânê

Meter:
x x x x ᴗ ᴗ x // x x x x ᴗ ᴗ x
x x x x ᴗ ᴗ x // x x x x ᴗ ᴗ x
x x x x ᴗ ᴗ x // x x x x ᴗ ᴗ x

Translation:
That good rule must be chosen which brings good fortune
to the man serving it with milk. In alliance with truth, it shall encompass the best (for us)
through its actions, Wise One. This very rule shall I now bring to realization for us.

— Yasna 51.1 (translated by Stanley Insler)

Like all the Gathic meters, the meter of the Vohukhshathra Gatha has been analyzed in comparison with the Vedic metre found in the Vedas. It shares the eleven-syllable verse count as well as the caesura after the fourth syllable. On the other hand, the Gathic verses lack any qualitative structure, i.e., there is no recognicable pattern of stressed vs. unstressed syllables.

== Content ==
The main theme of the Vohukhshathra Gatha is Kshatra Vairya, the desirable good power, after which the poem is also named. Another central theme is praise of Zarathustra's important allies, namely kavi Vishtaspa his followers Frashaoshtra and Jamaspa as well as Maidyoimangha. The poem closes with the hope for the advent of good power in exchange for proper worship of The Wise One.

== Editions and translations ==
The Vohukhshathra Gatha has been edited and translated as part of the Yasna or wider Avesta collection. The most important edition was published by Geldner. Early translations were provided by Mills into English and by Darmesteter into French. An important scholar on the Gathas is Helmut Humbach who published a seminal scholarly translation as well as a translation aimed at lay people. A review of the most important translations is provided by Malandra.
