= Vahishtoishti Gatha =

Zoroastrian religious hymn

- ← Vohukhshathra Gatha Airyaman ishya →
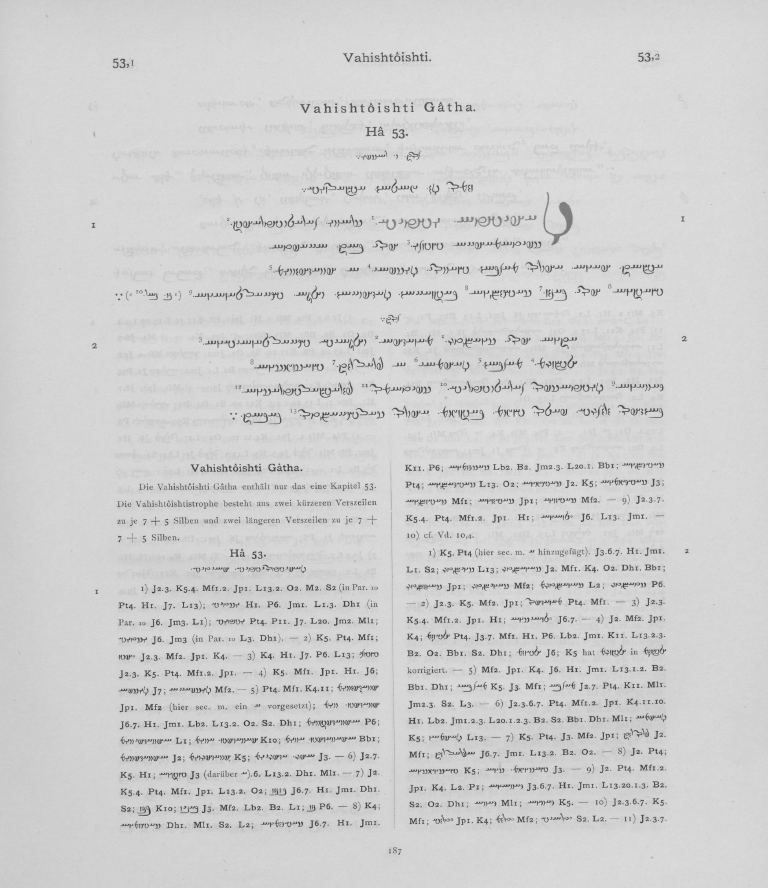
- First page of the Vahishtoishti Gatha in Geldner's edition of the Avesta

Information
- Religion: Zoroastrianism
- Author: Zarathustra
- Language: Old Avestan
- Verses: 36

The Vahishtoishti Gatha is the last of the five Gathas, the most important texts of Zoroastrianism. It is named after the first word of the first verse. With just 9 stanzas and 36 verses it is the shortest poem in the collection.

== Overview ==
The name of the Vahishtoishti Gatha, also rendered as Gatha Vahishtoishti, Gāθā vahištōištiš or Vahištōišti Gāθā , is drawn from the first words of the poem vahishtâ îshtish. The meaning of these words translates as best wish, but there is no particular connection to its content.

Among the Gathic hymns, the Vahishtoishti Gatha is the shortest overall and the least well preserved. It only covers a single chapter of the Yasna, called haiti or ha. Since the Gathas are edited as part of the wider Yasna, their chapters and stanzas are, therefore, referenced using the notation of the Yasna. Within this system, the Vahishtoishti Gatha covers ha 53 of the Yasna.

== Structure ==
The Vahishtoishti Gatha consists of a single ha (chapter) with nine stanzas. Each stanza consists of four verses leading to 36 verses in total. The meter varies within each stanza. The first two verses of a stanza consist of 12 syllables with a caesura after the first seven, whereas the remaining two verses consist of 21 syllables with two ceasuras after seven syllables each.

The first stanza of the Vahishtoishti Gatha reads as follows:

Transliteration
vahishtâ îshtish srâvî // zarathushtrahê
dà spitâmahyâ ýezî hôi // dât âyaptâ
ashât hacâ ahurô // mazdå ýavôi vîspâi â // hvanghevîm
ýaêcâ hôi daben sasheñcâ // daênayå vanghuyå // uxdhâ shyaothanâcâ

Meter:
x x x x ᴗ ᴗ x // x x x x x
x x x x ᴗ ᴗ x // x x x x x
x x x x ᴗ ᴗ x // x x x x ᴗ ᴗ x // x x x x x
x x x x ᴗ ᴗ x // x x x x ᴗ ᴗ x // x x x x x

Translation:
The best quest of Spitama Zarathustra
has has found a hearing
since Mazda Ahura, in accordance with truth, has granted the boons of good existence for all times
to him as well as to those who practice and master the utterances and actions of his good religion.

—Yasna 51.1 (translated by Humbach and Ichaporia)

Like all the Gathic meters, the meter of the Vahishtoishti Gatha has been analyzed in comparison with the Vedic metre found in the Vedas. It shares the eleven-syllable verse count as well as the caesura after the fourth syllable. On the other hand, the Gathic verses lack any qualitative structure, i.e., there is no recognicable pattern of stressed vs. unstressed syllables.

== Content ==
The Vahishtoishti Gatha differs substantially from the other four gathas. It is less about the ritual aspects of the religion and has a pronounced "didactic character". The poem is commonly interpreted as a wedding sermon, which may have been created for the occasion of the marriage between Zarathustra's youngest daughter Pourucista and Jamaspa of the Hvoguva clan. This would make it the only gatha which directly relates to a specific event in Zarathustra's life.
