= Helmut Humbach =

German scholar in Iranian Studies (1921–2017)

- Born: 12 April 1921; Munich, Germany
- Died: 3 April 2017 (aged 95); Mainz, Germany

Academic background
- Education: LMU Munich
- Thesis: (1951)
- Academic advisors: Ferdinand Sommer; Karl Hoffmann

Academic work
- Discipline: Indo-European philology; Iranian studies; Zoroastrism
- Institutions: Saarland University; University of Mainz
- Main interests: Gathas
- Influenced: Jean Kellens; Prods Oktor Skjærvø

Helmut Humbach (* December 4, 1921 in Munich; † April 3, 2017 in Mainz) was a German linguist and Iranist. He was a professor of Indo-European philology at the Johannes Gutenberg University Mainz. He is recognized particularly for his work on the Gathas of Zarathustra.

== Career ==
After completing his military service in World War II, Helmut Humbach studied Indo-European linguistics at LMU Munich under Ferdinand Sommer. In 1951, he received his doctorate and habilitated on the recommendation of Karl Hoffmann in 1954 with a translation of the Gathas. In 1956, he became a full professor of comparative linguistics at Saarland University and from 1958 for Oriental Studies at the same university. From 1961 until his retirement, he was professor of Indo-European philology at University of Mainz. In 1972, he became a fellow of the Royal Asiatic Society of Great Britain and Ireland. His assistants included Jean Kellens and Prods Oktor Skjærvø.

== Research ==
Helmut Humbach's research focussed on pre-Islamic languages and the history of Iran, Afghanistan and Central Asia. This includes, in particular, the Avestan language, Zoroastrianism as well as the Sassanid and Bactrian epigraphy. Helmut Humbach spent his life studying the Geographike Hyphegesis of Claudius Ptolemy, in particular volume 6, which covers the regions of Iran and Central Asia.

His main work was the translation of the Gathas. In was first published in German in 1959 as Die Gathas des Zarathustra. A substantially revised and expanded version of his translation was published in English in 1991 as The Gathas of Zarathustra and the Other Old Avestan Texts. In 1994, he also published a different English translation of the Gathas, which had a stronger focus on readability. Shortly before his death, he published a monograph reviewing his own work.

== Recognition ==
Humbach is mostly recognized for his translation of the Gathas, which have been described as the most faithful translations into a Western language. In addition, his work on the Gathas is seen as a turning point in their interpretation. Before Humbach, the Gathas were considered to be biographically infused, reflections on the theology system created by Zarathustra. Beginning with Humbach, however, the Gathas began to be increasingly seen as hymns directed to Ahura Mazda and intended to be performed at the sacrifice.

== Honors ==
The impact of his work on the studies of Zoroastrianism was repeatedly recognized through a number of honors. In 1986, a Festschrift was published on the occasion of his 65th birthday. In 2001, a second Festschrift was published on the occasion of his 80th birthday. Finally, in 2017, a book was issued in honor of his 95th birthday.

== Selected works ==
- Humbach, Helmut (1959). Die Gathas des Zarathustra: Bd. 1: Einleitung; Text; Übersetzung; Paraphrase. Indogermanische Bibliothek. Vol. 1. Heidelberg: Carl Winter Universitätsverlag.
- Humbach, Helmut (1959). Die Gathas des Zarathustra: Bd. 2: Kommentar. Indogermanische Bibliothek. Vol. 2. Heidelberg: Carl Winter Universitätsverlag.
- Die Kaniška-Inschrift von Surkh-Kotal: Ein Zeugnis des jüngeren Mithraismus aus Iran. Wiesbaden, 1960.
- Die awestische Länderliste. Wiener Zeitschrift für die Kunde Süd- und Ostasiens. Band 4. Wien 1960. S. 36–46.
- Ptolemaios-Studien. Wiener Zeitschrift für die Kunde Süd- und Ostasiens. Band 5. Wien 1961. S. 68–74.
- Kušān und Hephthaliten. München 1961.
- Baktrische Sprachdenkmäler. 2 Bände. Wiesbaden 1966/67.
- Vaeθā Nask: An Apocryphal Text on Zoroastrian Problems. Wiesbaden, 1969. (zusammen mit Kaikhusroo M. JamaspAsa)
- Die aramäische Inschrift von Taxila. Mainz und Wiesbaden 1969.
- Pursišnīhā: A Zoroastrian Catechism. 2 Bände. Wiesbaden 1971. (zusammen mit Kaikhusroo M. JamaspAsa).
- Historisch-geographische Noten zum sechsten Buch der Geographie des Ptolemaios (=Jahrbuch des Römisch-Germanischen Zentralmuseums Mainz. Band 19). Mainz 1972, S. 89–98.
- Eine weitere aramäoiranische Inschrift der Periode des Aśoka aus Afghanistan. Mainz and Wiesbaden 1974. (zusammen mit Gholam Djelani Davary).
- Die baktrische Inschrift IDN 1 von Dasht-e Nāwūr (Afghanistan). Mainz and Wiesbaden 1976. (zusammen mit G. Djelani Davary).
- The Sassanian Inscription of Paikuli. 3 Teile in 4 Bänden. Wiesbaden 1978–83. (zusammen mit Prods O. Skjærvø)
- Die sogdischen Inschriftenfunde vom oberen Indus (Pakistan). Beiträge zur Allgemeinen und Vergleichenden Archäologie. Band 2. Darmstadt 1980. S. 201–28.
- A Western Approach to Zarathushtra. Journal of the K. R. Cama Oriental Institute. Band 51. 1984. S. 1–56.
- Ērbedestān: An Avesta-Pahlavi Text. Edition und Übersetzung. München 1990. (zusammen mit Josef Elfenbein)
- Humbach, Helmut (1991). The Gathas of Zarathustra and the Other Old Avestan Texts. Carl Winter Universitätsverlag.
- The Heritage of Zarathushtra: A New Translation of His Gāthās. Heidelberg 1994. (zusammen mit Pallan Ichaporia).
- Humbach, Helmut; Ichaporia, Pallan R. (1998). Zamyād Yasht: Yasht 19 of the Younger Avesta; Text, Translation, Commentary. Wiesbaden: Harrassowitz Verlag. ISBN 978-3447040266.
- Ptolemy, Geography, Book 6: Middle East, Central and North Asia, China. 2 Bände. Wiesbaden 1998–2002 (zusammen mit Susanne Ziegler)
- Humbach, Helmut; Faiss, Klaus (2010). Zarathushtra and his Antagonists - A Sociolinguistic Study with English and German Translations of His Gathas. Wiesbaden: Reichert Verlag. ISBN 978-3895007682.
- Humbach, Helmut; Faiss, Klaus (2012). Herodotus's Scythians and Ptolemy's Central Asia: Semasiological and Onomasiological Studies. Wiesbaden: Reichert Verlag. ISBN 978-3895008870.
- Humbach, Helmut; Faiss, Klaus (2016). Avestica. Münchener Studien zur Sprachwissenschaft. Vol. 25. Dettelbach: J.H.Röll Verlag. ISBN 978-3897544772.

== See also ==
- Karl Hoffmann
- Jean Kellens
- Prods Oktor Skjærvø
