= Sitz im Leben =

German phrase in Biblical criticism

Sitz im Leben (German pronunciation: [ˈzɪts ʔɪm ˈleːbm̩]) is a German phrase roughly translating to "setting in life". It originated in Biblical criticism, and stands for the context in which a text, or object, has been created, and its function and purpose at that time. The Sitz im Leben is also used to refer to the social, ethnic and cultural setting of a site at a particular era. When interpreting a text, object, or region, the Sitz im Leben has to be taken into consideration in order to allow a proper contextual interpretation.

== Origins ==
The term originated with the German Protestant theologian Hermann Gunkel and originally was stated in the Bible. The term Sitz im Volksleben ("setting in the life of the people") was employed for the first time in 1906 and the term Sitz im Leben in 1918. The term Sitz im Leben was used by classic form critics, as discussed by Chris Tuckett, "...it has been pointed out that the term Sitz im Leben was used in a rather peculiar way by the classic form critics. In fact the term is a sociological one, describing a typical situation within any community" so that the meaning of the text is bound up with its function in the community, and social context. Some have noted that it is also used in biblical language.
