= Ahunavaiti Gatha =

Zoroastrian religious hymn

- ← Yenghe hatam Yasna Haptanghaiti →
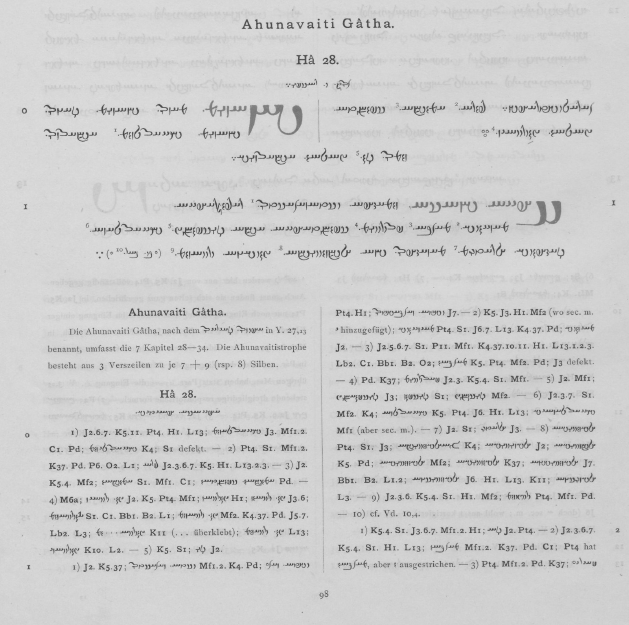
- First page of the Ahunavaiti Gatha in Geldner's edition of the Avesta

Information
- Religion: Zoroastrianism
- Author: Zarathustra
- Language: Old Avestan
- Chapters: 7
- Verses: 300

The Ahunavaiti Gatha is the first of the five Gathas, the most important texts of Zoroastrianism. It is named after the Ahuna vairya manthra and, with 300 verses grouped into seven hymns, it is the longest of the Gathas.

== Overview ==
The name of the Ahunavaiti Gatha, also transliterated as Ahunauuaitī Gāθā, is derived from the Ahuna vairya, the most important Zoroastrian manthra. It is different from the other gathas which are named after their first words. Since the Ahuna vairya has the same poetic meter, it may have originally been its first stanza. Overall, the Ahunavaiti Gatha has attracted the most scholarly interest of all the five Gathas.

== Within the Yasna ==
In the manuscripts, the Ahunavaiti Gatha never appears individually but always within the Long Liturgies, in particular the Yasna. As a result, the Gathas are edited as part of the wider Yasna, and its chapters and stanzas are, therefore, referenced using the notation of the Yasna. Within this system, the Ahunavaiti Gatha covers chapters, called ha, 28-34 of the Yasna. It is not directly followed by the second gatha, i.e., the Ushtavaiti Gatha, but by the Yasna Haptanghaiti. Only thereafter, follow the next three gathas, whereas the fifth and final gatha only follows after another interruption.

== Structure ==
The Ahunavaiti Gatha is grouped into seven hymns with 100 stanzas and 300 verses. Although the Ushtavaiti Gatha has slightly more verses (330), the verses of the Ahunavaiti Gatha are longer, which makes it the longest of all Gathic poems in terms of word count.

The meter of the poem consists of verses with sixteen syllables. It has a caesura after the first seven, leading to a verse with two half lines of seven and nine syllables. Three verses form a single stanza. In addition, the first stanza of the Ahunavaiti Gatha is repeated twice at the end of each of its seven has. This refrain is followed by the Ahuna vairya manthra, repeated four times, then the Ashem vohu manthra, repeated three times, next the invocation of the ha, and finally a Yenghe hatam manthra.

The first stanza of the Ahunavaiti Gatha reads as follows:

Transliteration
ahyâ ýâsâ nemanghâ // ustânazastô rafedhrahyâ
manyêush mazdâ pourvîm // speñtahyâ ashâ vîspêñg shyaothanâ
vanghêush xratûm mananghô // ýâ xshnevîshâ gêushcâ urvânem

Meter:
x x x x ᴗ ᴗ x // x x x x x x x x x
x x x x ᴗ ᴗ x // x x x x x x x x x
x x x x ᴗ ᴗ x // x x x x x x x x x

Translation:
With hands outstreched in reverence of him, (our) support, the spirit virtuous through truth,
I first entreat all (of you), Wise One, through this act
for (that) through which Thou mayest satisfy the determination of (my) good thinking and of the soul of the cow.

— Yasna 28.1 (translated by Stanley Insler)

Like all the Gathic meters, the meter of the Ahunavaiti Gathahas been analyzed in light of the Vedic metre, but no direct relationship is established. Its 16 syllable verse has no direct correspondence. There is also no established prosody for the Gathas, but Gippert notes a tendency of ᴗ ᴗ x , i.e., two short syllables and an anceps, for the end of a seven-syllable half line. Furthermore, the syllable count of the second half line shows some fluctuations in the extant texts (between 8-10) for which no universal explanation has been found yet. There are, however, a number of prosodic regularities like the fact that all occurrences of the inverse naming of Ahura Mazda, i.e., Mazda Ahura, are found in the Ahunavaiti Gatha. Gippert, for example, has argued that the seven-syllable half line, found in all Gathic poems, is the remnant of an earlier Indo-Iranian rhythmic unit and that the second, nine-syllable half line of the Ahunavaiti Gatha formed as an extension of the first one.

== Content ==
Overall, the first four gathas have a complex and elaborate poetic style, and do not present a structured narrative. This is particularly true for the first hymn of the Ahunavaiti Gatha (Y 28), which is characterized by a "complicated and ambiguous syntactical structure". The second hymn (Y 29) is known as the Complaint of the Ox-Soul or the Bovine's Lament. It is structured as a dialogue between a cow and an unnamed audience, in which the cow laments the suffering she endures as a result of the cattle raids that were common among the Indo-Iranian pastoral nomads. It has been described as "the most esoteric of all the Gatha hymns." The third hymn (Y 30) covers a number of fundamental Zoroastrian ideas, like the opposition between good and evil as well as the rejection of the daevas, whereas the fourth hymn (Y 31) focusses on the "precepts of the Wise Lord" and their benefits to his followers. The dominant theme of the fifth hymn (Y 32) is the "condemnation of the ways of deceit and sin". In the sixth hymn (Y 33), the topic returns to how the faitful can best fulfill Mazda's commands. Finally, the seventh hymn (Y 34) contains the promise of Zarathustra that Mazda will be provided with proper worship and praise. It ends with the prospect of the final perfection and transfiguration of the world.
