= Airyaman ishya =

Important prayer in Zoroastrianism

- ← Vahishtoishti Gatha
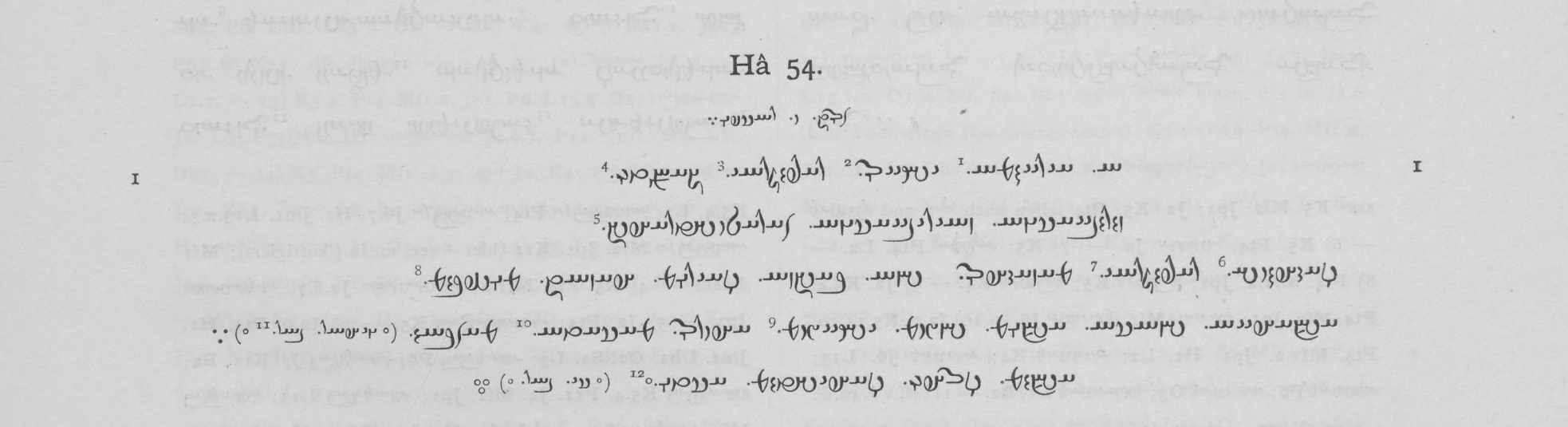
- Airyaman ishya (Y 54.1) manthra in Geldner's edition of the Avesta

Information
- Religion: Zoroastrianism
- Language: Old Avestan
- Period: Old Avestan period

The Airyaman ishya (/ˈɛəriˌæmən ˈɪʃiə/; airyaman išya, airyə̄mā išyō) is Zoroastrianism's fourth of the four Gathic Avestan manthras, and one of the most important prayers in Zoroastrianism. It is assumed to be a call toward the community or its hypostasis Airyaman.

== Name ==
The prayer is named after its opening words, ā airyə̄mā išyō. In present-day Zoroastrian usage, the airyama of these opening words are considered to be an invocation of the divinity Airyaman, the yazata of healing. The opening words may however have originally been an appeal to "the community" (or "tribe"), which would reflect the etymologically derived meaning of airyaman.

== In relation to the other manthras ==
Like the other three manthras (Ahuna vairya, Ashem vohu, Yenghe hatam), the Airyaman ishya is in Old Avestan. While the first three manthras are placed at Yasna 27.13-27.15, immediately preceding the Gathas, the Airyaman ishya - at Yasna 54.1 - provides the closure. Also unlike the first three, the theological exegesis of the Airyaman ishya is not embedded in the Yasna liturgy itself. Like the Yenghe hatam, the third of the four manthras, the Airyaman ishya is a prayer. Both it and the Yenghe hatam are without the enigmatic "pronounced magical character" of the first two manthras.

== In other scripture ==
In Yasht 3.8, 11 and 15, the Airyaman ishya is described as the weapon with which to put the daeva Taromaiti ("heresy") to flight. Like the Ahuna vairya (the first of the four great manthras), the Airyaman ishya is "the most excellent, the most mighty, the most efficacious, the most smiting, the most victorious, the most healing, the greatest" of the manthras. (Yasht 1.1-1.3, 3.5-3.6 and 11.3) Also like the Ahuna vairya, the Airyaman ishya has the power to elicit good thoughts, words and deeds, and so further Asha and weaken the Druj. (Visperad 24.0-2).

Since its incantation was considered the most effective form of healing (Yasht 3.6), the Airyaman ishya was accorded special status in the religion. Vendidad 20.12 notes its efficacy against "all sickness and death, all sorcerers and witches, all seducers belonging to the Lie." The Yasna verse immediately following the prayer considers the Airyaman ishya "the greatest uttering of Asha." (Yasna 54.2)

== In Zoroastrian tradition ==
In the Middle Persian literature of the 9th-12th century, the Airyaman ishya is described to be the prayer that will be recited by the saoshyans to bring about the final renovation of the world. This eschatological role is already alluded to in Avestan texts, and the concepts of Asha ("Truth"), Ashi ("Reward"/"Recompense") and Airyaman (see translation below, the three words are also etymologically related) all have an eschatological aspect.

Besides being recited (four times) during the Yasna ceremony, the prayer is also part of the Ashirvad, the blessings invoked during a Zoroastrian marriage ceremony.

== Structure and content ==
Transliteration based on the edition of Karl F. Geldner, Avesta, the Sacred Books of the Parsis, Stuttgart, 1896:

ā airyə̄mā iš́yō rafəδrāi jaṇtū
nərəbyascā nāiribyascā zaraθuštrahē
vaŋhə̄uš rafəδrāi manaŋhō

yā daēnā vairīm hanāt̰ mīždəm
aṣ̌ahyā yāsā aṣ̌īm
yąm iš́yąm ahurō masatā mazdå

Like all Gathic Avestan verses, the prayer is altogether ambiguous and translations vary significantly.

== Translation ==
A translation by Dr. Irach J. S. Taraporewala below.

May the much desired Brotherhood come hither for our rejoicing,
For the men and for the maidens of Zarathushtra,
for the fulfilment of Vohu Mano (good mind);
Whosoever Inner-self earns the precious reward.
I will pray to Asha (righteousness) for the blessing,
Which greatly to be desired, Ahura Mazda hath meant for us.

A liturgically inclined translation by Vazquez reads:

May Airyaman bring aid to all people of Zarathushtra,
And uphold the enlightened spiritual teachings,
Which deserve enviable praise.
I plead for the empowerment,
Which Ashi provides through Asha,
As Ahura Mazda has ordained.

== Bibliography ==
- Boyce, Mary (1984), "Airyaman", Encyclopaedia Iranica, vol. 1, New York: Routledge & Kegan Paul, pp. 694–695.
- Brunner, Christopher J. (1984), "Airyaman išya", Encyclopaedia Iranica, vol. 1, New York: Routledge & Kegan Paul, p. 695.
- Dhalla, Maneckji N. (1938), History of Zoroastrianism, New York: OUP.
- Humbach, Helmut; Elfenbein, Josef; Skjærvø, Prods Oktor (1991), The Gāthās of Zarathushtra and other Old Avestan texts, Part II, Commentary, Heidelberg: Winter.
- Windfuhr, Gernot (2001), "Cosmic numerology in Zoroastrianism: the four sacred formulas", Philologica et Linguistica (Festschrift für Helmut Humbach zum 80.), Trier: WVT, pp. 562–571.
- Humbach, Helmut; Ichaporia, Pallan (1994), "Yasna 54,1. Conclusion", The Heritage of Zarathushtra. A new translation of his Gāthās, Heidelberg: Winter.
- Humbach, Helmut; Faiss, Klaus (2010), "Yasna 54,1. Conclusion", Zarathushtra and his Antagonists, Wiesbaden: Ludwig Reichert.
