= Ashem vohu =

Important prayer in Zoroastrianism

- ← Ahuna vairya Yenghe hatam →
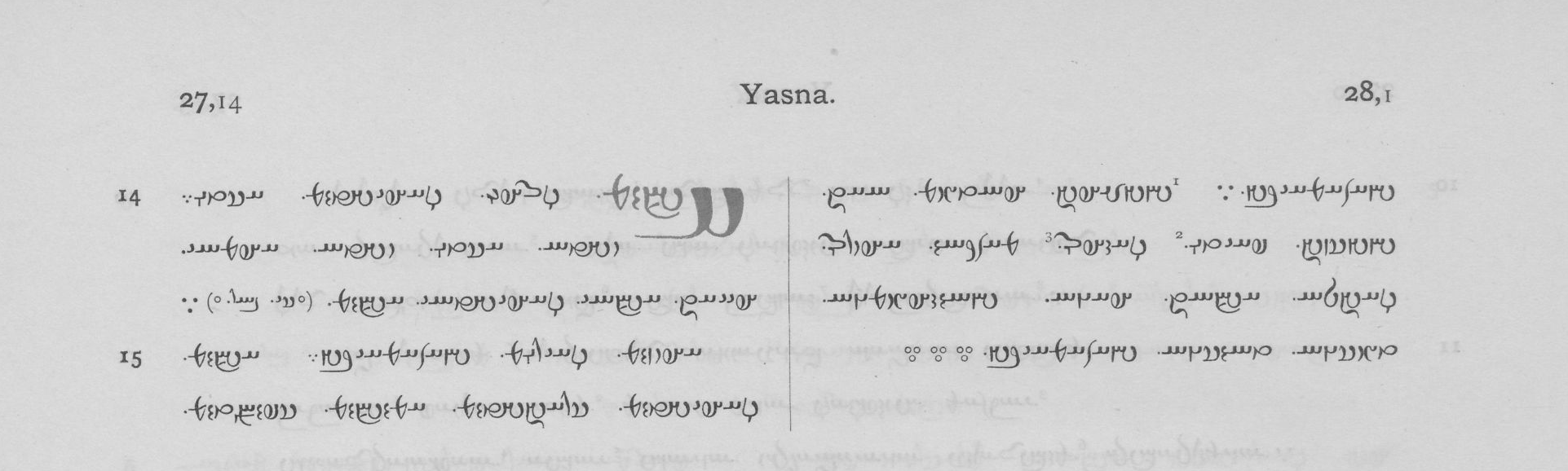
- Ashem vohu (Y 27.14) and Yenghe hatam (Y 27.15) manthra in Geldner's edition of the Avesta

Information
- Religion: Zoroastrianism
- Language: Avestan
- Period: Avestan period

The Ashem vohu (/ˈʌʃɛm ˈvɔːhuː/, Avestan: 𐬀𐬴𐬆𐬨 𐬬𐬊𐬵𐬏 aṣ̌əm vohū) is the second most important manthra, and one of the most important prayers in Zoroastrianism. It is dedicated to Asha, a Zoroastrian concept denoting truth, order or righteousness.

Together with the Ahuna vairya, the Yenghe hatam, and the Airyaman ishya; the Ashem vohu forms the four manthras that enclose the Gathas in the Yasna. It is also at the end of most of the prayers in the Khordeh Avesta, except a certain few, most notably the Fravarane.

== In the Avesta ==
In the Yasna, the Ahuna vairya (Y. 27.13), the Ashem vohu (Y. 27.14), and the Yenghe hatam (Y. 27.15) precede the Gathas, which are followed by the Airyaman ishya (Y. 54.1). Together with the Yasna Haptanghaiti, these texts form the Old Avestan layer of the Avesta. In the Younger Avestan portions of the texts, the Ashem vohu appears more than 200 times.

== Text and interpretation ==
The Ashem vohu is overall the shortest of the four Gathic manthras. It is dedicated to Asha, a central concept of Zoroastrianism. It consists of only twelve words which are arranged in an alliterative fashion. This may have helped ordinary people to more easily remember it. It repeatedly uses the words aṣ̌a (truth, order), vohū/vahištā (good/best), astī (is) and uštā (desire); showing the centrality of these terms. It has been argued that it was one of the prayers used from early on at the five daily times of prayer known as gáh.

Prayer
aṣ̌əm vohū vahištəm astī
uštā astī uštā ahmāi
hyat̰ aṣ̌āi vahištāi aṣ̌əm

Translation:

IPA Transliteration:
aʂəm vohuː vahiʃtəm astiː
uʃtaː astiː uʃtaː ahmaːi
hjat aʂaːi vahiʃtaːi aʂəm

The text poses a number of challenges for a grammatical analysis. The term vohū translates to good and can be used as a regular adjective or as a noun. In the latter case it acquires the meaning of possession, comparable to the English noun good in the sense of item of merchandise. The first line can therefore mean both "asha is the best possession" or "asha [is] good, it is best." The term uštā is equally ambiguous. It can be derived from ušta (desired things) or from ušti (desire). Finally, the term ahmāi can refer to itself or to the next words hyat̰ aṣ̌āi. These ambiguities have resulted in a number of diverging translations, none of which has found universal acceptance.

== Translations ==
Translations include:

Order is the best good (reward/possession) there is.
There are wished-for things in his wish for this one
when his Order is for the best Order.

and

Truth is best (of all that is) good.
As desired, as desired, truth
is for him who (represents) best truth.

and

Holiness (Asha) is the best of all good:
it is also happiness.
Happy the man who is holy with perfect holiness!"

== Sogdian version ==
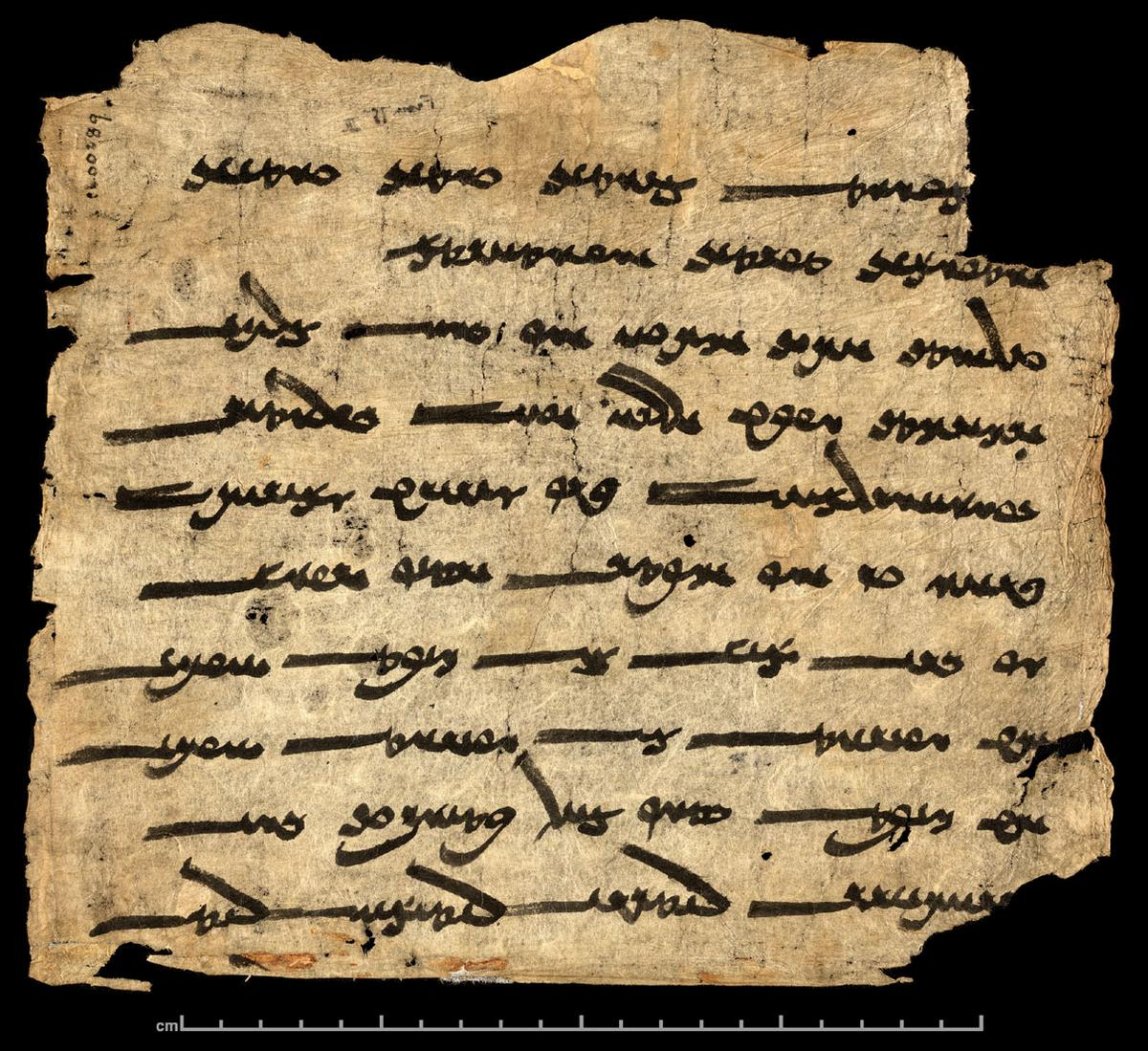
Sogdian manuscript from the 9th century CE, containing a Sogdian version of the Ashem Vohu

In the early 20th century, several thousands documents were discovered by the Daoist monk Wang Yuanlu in the Library Cave at Dunhuang. They were subsequently acquired and brought to Britain by Sir Aurel Stein. In these documents, a Sogdian version of the Ashem vohu was discovered in the 1970 and translated by Nicholas Sims-Williams.

Sogdian
𐼺𐼴𐼶𐽁𐽂 𐼺𐼷𐽁𐽂𐼰𐼷
𐼴𐽁𐽂𐼰𐼰𐼷 𐼰𐽁𐽂𐼴𐼶𐼺𐼰𐼷
𐽂𐼴𐽀𐽂𐼰𐼷 𐼰𐼶𐼴𐽁𐽂𐼰𐼷𐽀𐽂𐼺

Translation:

Reconstruction in Old Sogdian (Note: This is a reconstruction by Gershevitch into a hypothetical Old Iranian stage of the Sogdian language.)
urtam wahu wahištam ištī
uštā istī uštā ahmāi
yat urtāi wahištāi urtam

This version shows some phonological and linguistic peculiarities compared to the extant Avestan version. Ilya Gershevitch has, for example, opined that the Ashem vohu must have been known to the Sogdians before they converted to Zoroastrianism. Combined with the fact that it contains no specific Zoroastrian beliefs, Gershevitch argues that the manthra should be considered to be pan-Iranian. On the other hand, Alberto Cantera sees the text as a merely Sogdianized version of the Old Avestan original. He particularly points out the preservation of rt, which, according to him, indicates that the Avestan variation between aṣ̌a and arta is simply a late phonological development from the Sasanian Empire period and not original to Old Avestan.

== See also ==
- Zoroastrian prayer
