= Ahuna vairya =

First Zorastrian Canonical Formula

- Ashem vohu →
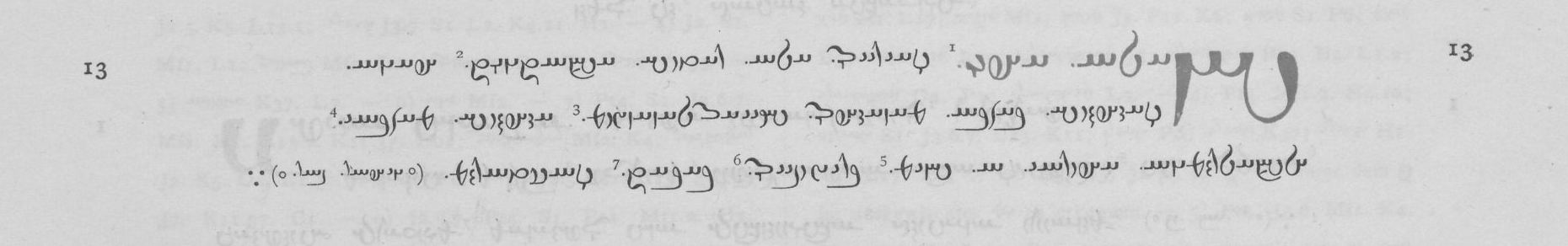
- Ahuna vairya manthra in Geldner's edition of the Avesta

Information
- Religion: Zoroastrianism
- Language: Avestan
- Period: Avestan period

Ahuna vairya (Avestan: 𐬀𐬵𐬎𐬥𐬀 𐬬𐬀𐬌𐬭𐬌𐬌𐬀) is the first of Zoroastrianism's four Gathic Avestan manthras. The text, which appears in Yasna 27.13, is also known after its opening words yatha ahu vairyo. In Zoroastrian tradition, the manthra is also known as the ahun(a)war.

Numerous translations and interpretations exist, but the overall meaning of the text remains obscure. The Ahuna vairya and Ashem vohu (the second most sacred manthra at Yasna 27.14) are together "very cryptic formulas, of a pronounced magical character." The Ahunavaiti Gatha (chapters 28-34 of the Yasna), is named after the Ahuna vairya manthra.

== In relation to the other manthras ==
Like the other three manthra (Ashem vohu, Yenghe hatam, Airyaman ishya), the Ahuna vairya is part of the Gathic canon, that is, part of the group of texts composed in the more archaic dialect of the Avestan language. Together with the other three manthras, the Ahuna vairya is part of the 'envelope' that liturgically encloses the Gathas, i.e. the hymns attributed to Zoroaster. One of the manthras, the Airyaman ishya (Yasna 54.1) follows the Gathas, while the other three manthras – Ahuna vairya, Ashem vohu and Yenghe hatam (together at Yasna 27.13-27.15) – precede them.

Unlike the third and fourth manthra, the first two —the Ahuna vairya and the Ashem vohu—are part of the Kusti prayers. Unlike the third and fourth manthra, the first two do not express wishes and are technically purificatory and meditational declarations (asti, "it is").

== In the Avesta ==
The Ahuna vairya is already a subject of theological exegesis in the Avesta itself, in particular in Yasna 19, where "this utterance is a thing of such a nature, that if all the corporeal and living world should learn it, and learning hold fast by it, they would be redeemed from their mortality." (19.10) In Yasna 19.3 and 4.8, the manthra is described as having been a primordial utterance of Ahura Mazda, articulated immediately after the creation of the spiritual world (and before the material world), and that its efficacy in aiding the righteous is due to its primordial nature.

As a primordial utterance, the Ahura vairya is described to have talismanic virtues: the power to aid mortals in distress, and inversely as a potent weapon against the daevas. Elsewhere in the Avesta, the Ahuna vairya is described as the "most victorious" (Yasht 11.13), as the "veracious word" (Yasna 8.1), as the "sacred gift" (Yasna 27.7). In Vendidad 11.3, in addition to being "most healing", frequent recitation of the Ahura vairya is prescribed as an act of hygiene to "protect the body". In Yasna 9.14, Zoroaster is given credit as the first mortal to recite it.

== In tradition ==
The hymn's supremacy among sacred Zoroastrian formulae is well developed in the 9th-11th century texts of Zoroastrian tradition.

In the Denkard ('Acts of Religion', 9th century), four of the twenty-one nasks are described to have expounded on the efficacy of the hymn (8.44.1), and each volume of the nasks is said to have been initially assigned its title from a word in the Ahuna vairya prayer (Denkard intro, 6, 8, 17, 18, 9.1.4). The manthra's potency to smite daevas and protect life and property are described at length (4.38-45, 8.43.81, 9.1.4), and the it's primordial nature is seen as the root and summation of the belief in Ahura Mazda, "the seed of seeds of the reckoning of the religion." (8.45.1)

The Bundahishn, an 11th/12th century narrative of Zoroastrian cosmological myths, continues and embellishes the Avesta's description of the Ahuna vairya as a primordial utterance. In that tradition, Ahuna vairya is not only an utterance of Mazda following the creation of the spiritual world. Additionally, in Bundahishn 12.13-14, the spirit of the yatha ahu vairyo is the first manifestation of the luminaries that Ahura Mazda created, i.e. the spirit of the manthra is the first of the material creations, and is at the same time the "fire form" force from which the material world is created. Moreover, in articulating the manthra, Ahura Mazda made his ultimate triumph evident to "the evil spirit" (Angra Mainyu), who then fell back "confounded and impotent as to the harm he caused the creatures of Ahuramazd" (1.29-30).

The Vendidad's prescription of recitation of the manthra as an act of hygiene is reiterated in the Sayast ne Sayast, which prescribes recitation when sneezing or coughing (12.32), and recommends invocation when pouring potable liquids (10.7). The Sayast ne Sayast additionally notes that a mumbling of the prayer is particularly offensive. (10.25) The Denkard additionally suggests the manthra be uttered when entering a house (9.18.5).

While the Avesta's Yasna 19 sees the subject of the Ahuna vairya manthra as referring to Zoroaster, and possibly to his successors, later tradition (Denkard 9.24.1, also Zatspram 1.13.19) infers no such connection, and applies it evenly to all followers of Zoroaster's teaching.

== Text, translation and interpretation ==
Like all Gathic Avestan verses, the prayer is altogether ambiguous and translations vary significantly. Even though several translations and interpretations exist, the overall meaning of the prayer remains obscure. The terseness of the prose, elaborate arrangement and poetical techniques make a translation from the Old Avestan difficult (See also: difficulties in translating the Gathas). Given its syntactic density, scholarly agreement on a definitive translation, or even close approximation of its meaning, remains unlikely. Translations based on Middle Persian interpretations (and commentaries) of the hymn also exist and can differ greatly from those based on the Avestan original.

The version found in the Avesta edition of Geldner reads:

yaθā ahū vairyō aθā ratuš aṣ̌āt̰cīt̰ hacā
vaŋhə̄uš dazdā manaŋhō š́yaoθananąm aŋhə̄uš mazdāi
xṣ̌aθrəmcā ahurāi ā yim drigubyō dadat̰ vāstārəm

There are transliterations available with differences concerning certain words. Transliteration of Helmut Humbach:

yaθā ahū vairyō, aθā ratuš aṣ̌āt̰cīt̰ hacā
vaŋhə̄uš dazdā manaŋhō, š́yaoθənanąm^{1} aŋhə̄uš mazdāi
xšaθrəmcā ahurāi ā, yim^{2} drigubyō dadat̰ vāstārəm

^{1} other version is "š́yaoθananąm" (Geldner)
^{2} this is the younger avestan form, old avestan is "yə̄m"

Dastur Dhalla also notes that a corrupt form of the prayer is commonly used:

athāu veryo thāre tose sāde chide chāvanghoise dezdā manengho sotthenanām
anghyos Mazdāe khosetharamchāe orāe āiyem daregobyo daredar vāstārem'

Translation by Boyce essentially derived from that of S. Insler:

As the master, so is the judge to be chosen in accord with truth.
Establish the power of acts arising from a life lived with good purpose,
for Mazda and for the Lord whom they made pastor for the poor.

A simple translation from the Zoroastrian Middle Persian by Darmesteter:

the will of the Lord is the law of righteousness.
the gifts of the Good Mind to the deeds done in this world for Mazda.
he who relieves the poor makes Ahura king.

A translation from the Avestan by Windfuhr:

Whereas he shall be chosen by the world, so, according to Truth,
the judgement of deeds done by the world in Good Faith (Mind) is yielded to Mazda,
and the Power of the Ahura whom they shall assign as pastor to the poor.

Vazquez's liturgically inclined translation is:

Worthy and chosen through Asha are they,
The Ratus throughout the world,
Who bring enlightenment to the world,
Through deeds done on behalf of Ahura Mazda,
Who has become the advocate of the impoverished.

An interpretive poetic translation of Yatha Ahu Vairyo grounded in camel (Zarath-"ustra") pastoral reality and emphasizing accuracy of meaning:

As the one fit to guide the camels is chosen,
so the measure of judgment is set from what is true.

Through good understanding, action is shaped,
in alignment with knowing.

And authority belongs to the one they establish
as guardian of the weakest in the caravan.

Humbach, Elfenbein and Skjærvø translate it as:

As judgment is to be chosen by the world,
so the judgment (which is) in accord with the truth,
(which is to be passed) on the actions of good throughout the world,
is assigned to the Wise (Lord) (Mazdāi),
and the power (is assigned) to the (Wise) Lord (ahurāi)
whom they established as shepherd to the needy.

The Zoroastrian Assembly translates it as:

Both the lord and the leader are to be chosen

because of their righteousness.

These two appointments are made with good mind

so that acts of life are done for the Wise One,

and the dominion of God is well established,

in which the chosen person becomes the rehabilitator

of the rightful who are oppressed.

A metrically preserved, theologically precise poetic translation ensuring accuracy in both meaning and cadence:

As rules the Ahu, so must one guide,

Through Asha alone, by wisdom’s side.

With Vohu Manah, let wisdom take lead,

Through truth-bound hands and selfless deed.

To Mazda’s realm, the rule must go,

To shield the weak from pain and woe.

Ahu – A title meaning "lord" or "ruler," referring to both spiritual and worldly leadership. Unlike later interpretations that limit Ahu to a religious figure, it originally applied to any authority governing under Asha’s law.

Asha – The cosmic law of truth and righteousness, governing not just ethics but the very structure of existence. Leadership must be aligned with Asha to be legitimate.

Vohu Manah – Literally "Good Mind," representing divine wisdom, moral clarity, and rational thought. A just ruler must lead not by force, but by intellect and virtue.

Mazda – The supreme principle of divine insight, creation, and justice. In Zoroastrian thought, Mazda is the embodiment of wisdom itself.

Other interpretations are listed in the further reading section below.
