= Jamaspa =

Figure from the Iranian national history

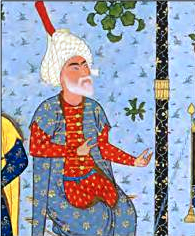
- Illustration of Jamaspa in the Shahnameh

In-universe information
- Affiliation: Vishtaspa
- Nationality: Iranian

Jamaspa (Avestan: 𐬬𐬌𐬱𐬙𐬁𐬯𐬞𐬀 Jāmāspa; Avestan pronunciation: [d̠ʒaːmaːspa]) is a figure from the Iranian national history, where he appears as an official at the court of Vishtaspa and overall important figure in the early history of Zoroastrianism.

== Name ==
The name Jamaspa is widely considered to be a contraction of tetrasyllabic jāma-aspa, an Avestan compound term, where the second word means aspa, i.e. horse. This term is also found in the names of people like Vishtaspa, Arjaspa and Lohraspa. Since they all originate from the same story, it has been interpreted as an important element in their culture. However, the meaning of the first term is unclear. One interpretation connects jāma- to Vedic kṣāmáh-, with the meaning burnt, singed. On the other hand, Gershevitch proposed leading horses, whereas Schwartz has argued for he who bridles horses.

== In the Avesta ==
In the Avesta, Jamaspa first appears in the Gathas with his brother Frashaoshtra, both from the clan of the Hvōgva. He is described as a counsellor and chancellor of Vishtaspa, the patron of Zarathustra, and quickly converts to the new faith. In the later texts found in the Young Avesta, Jamaspa also appears. In the Aban Yasht, he is grouped with people from the Gathas, and set apart from other, probably pre-Zoroastrian figures of the Iranian national tradition. In the Frawardin Yasht, he is again praised jointly with Frashaoshtra and Vishtaspa.

== In later tradition ==
According to later tradition, it is Jamaspa, who acquires a leadership role in the Zoroastrian community after the death of Zarathustra and it is him who writes down his teachings in the Avesta. He is a prominent figure in the Jamasp Namag (Story of Jamasp), also known as Ayatkar i Zamaspik (Memorial of Jamaspa). This text discusses a number of topics framed as a dialogue between him and Vishtaspa. He also appears in works like the Denkard, the Ayadgar i Zariran and the Shahnameh.
