= Trishtubh (Vedic metre) =

Vedic meter of 11 syllables

Trishtubh (Sanskrit: त्रिष्टुभ्, IPA: [tɽɪˈʂʈʊbʱ], IAST: Triṣṭubh) is a Vedic metre of 44 syllables (four padas of eleven syllables each), or any hymn composed in this metre. It is the most prevalent metre of the Rigveda, accounting for roughly 40% of its verses.

The Trishtubh pada contains a "break" or caesura, after either four or five syllables, necessarily at a word-boundary and if possible at a syntactic break.

== Structure ==
Different scholars have different methods of showing the structure of the line. Thus Hermann Oldenberg (1888) divided the line into three sections by placing one break at the caesura and another break four syllables before the end:

x x x x x, | x x | – ᴗ – x
x x x x, | x x x | – ᴗ – x

E. Vernon Arnold (1905) divided it into 4 + 3 + 4 syllables, whatever the caesura:

x x x x | x x x | – ᴗ – x

A more recent author, H. N. Randle (1957), on the other hand, divides it 4 + 4 + 3:

x x x x | x x x – | ᴗ – x

The division 4 + 4 + 3 is also favoured by the comparative metrist Paul Kiparsky (2018).

Because the line is catalectic, the final four syllables form a trochaic cadence.

== Statistics ==
A statistical study of 600 lines by Randle shows that 75% of triṣṭubh lines start with an iambic pattern (x – x –). The opening x u – – accounts for another 10%, x – ᴗ ᴗ for 6%, and x – – ᴗ for 4%.

The second measure tends not to be fully iambic: x – ᴗ – occurs in less than 7% of lines and x – – – hardly at all. The most common forms of the second measure are x ᴗ ᴗ – (63%) and x ᴗ – – (30%). When x ᴗ – – is used, the caesura always follows the 4th syllable.

Another study, by Gunkel and Ryan (2011), based on a much larger corpus, confirms the above and shows that the propensity for a syllable to be long in a triṣṭubh is greatest in the 2nd, 4th, 5th 8th and 10th positions of the line, while the 6th and 9th are almost always short. Long (heavy) syllables are found in the following percentages in the various positions:

49%, 86%, 52%, 96%, 63%, 12%, 40%, 97%, 4%, 98% 76%.

The two caesura positions (after the 4th or 5th syllable) according to Randle's statistics, are almost exactly equally common overall. But when the second measure is – ᴗ ᴗ –, a caesura after the 5th syllable is four times more common.

Thus, summing up the statistics above, the most common scheme is:

x – x – | –, ᴗ ᴗ – | ᴗ – x

But when the caesura comes after the 4th syllable, the following is common:

x – ᴗ –, | ᴗ ᴗ – – | ᴗ – x

== Example ==
An example of a triṣṭubh stanza is RV 2.3.1:

sámiddho agnír níhitaḥ pṛthivyâm
pratyáṅ víśvāni bhúvanān_{i}y asthāt
hótā pāvakáḥ pradívaḥ sumedhâ
devó devân yajat_{u}v agnír árhan

"Agni is set upon the earth well kindled
he standeth in the presence of all beings.
Wise, ancient, God, the Priest and Purifier
let Agni serve the Gods for he is worthy."
(trans. Ralph T. H. Griffith; the translator attempts to imitate the meter in English)

Following Randle's division, the above lines can be scanned as follows:

ᴗ – – – | –, ᴗ ᴗ – | ᴗ – x
– – – – | ᴗ, ᴗ ᴗ – | ᴗ – x
– – – ᴗ | –, ᴗ ᴗ – | ᴗ – x
– – – –, | ᴗ ᴗ ᴗ – | ᴗ – x

The Avesta has a parallel stanza of 4x11 syllables with a caesura after the fourth syllable.

== Later use ==
Trishtubh verses are also used in later literature, its archaic associations used to press home a "Vedic" character of the poetry. The Bhagavad Gita, while mostly composed in shloka (developed from the Vedic anushtubh) is interspersed with Trishtubhs. A particularly long section of Trishtubhs is chapter 11, verses 15-50.

== See also ==
- Anustubh
- Vedic meter
