= Jean Kellens =

Belgian Iranian studies professor (b. 1944)

Jean Kellens (born 26 January 1944 in Seraing, Belgium) is a Belgian Iranologist who specialises in Avestan studies. From 1974 to 1980 he was the assistant of German Professor and Iranologist, Helmut Humbach at Johannes Gutenberg University of Mainz. He also taught at the University of Liège until 1993 and then became a member of the Science Committee at the Collège de France.

== Works ==
- Les noms-racines de l'Avesta, Dr. Ludwig Reichert Verlag, Wiesbaden, 1974.
- Fravardin Yašt (Yt 13, 1-70), Wiesbaden, 1975.
- Le verbe avestique, Dr. Ludwig Reichert Verlag, Wiesbaden, 1984
- Avec Éric Pirart: Les textes vieil-avestiques, 3 volumes, Dr. Ludwig Reichert Verlag, Wiesbaden, 1988, 1990, 1991.
  - Kellens &Pirart, Eric & Jean (1991). "Les Textes vieil-avestiques". Journal of the American Oriental Society. 111 (3). American Oriental Society: 659–662. doi:10.2307/604322. JSTOR 604322.
- Langues et religions indo-iraniennes: Leçon inaugurale prononcée le mercredi 6 avril 1994. Paris : Collège de France, 1994.
- Le panthéon de l'Avesta ancien, Dr; Ludwig Reichert Verlag, Wiesbaden, 1994.
  - Kellens, Jean (1994). Le panthéon de l'avesta ancien. Dr. Ludwig Reichert Verlag.
- Zoroastre et l'Avesta ancien, Ludwig Reichert Verlag, Wiesbaden, 1994.
- Liste du verbe avestique, Wiesbaden, Dr. Ludwig Reichert Verlag, 1995.
- Essays on Zarathustra and Zoroastrianism, Mazda Publishers, Costa Mesa, 2000.
- avec Gérard Fussman, Henri-Paul Francfort et Xavier Tremblay, Āryas, Aryens et Iraniens en Asie Centrale, en collaboration, Paris : Collège de France, 2005.
- La quatrième naissance de Zarathushtra, Paris, Seuil, 2006.
  - Translated by Richard C. Foltz : The Fourth Incarnation of Zarathushtra. Avestan Studies in the West, Mazda Publishers, Inc. 2019.
- Études avestiques et mazdéennes. Vol. 1-9, Persika series, Peeters Publishers. 2006-2022.
- L’exégèse du sacrifice comme principe unitaire de l’Avesta, Les Conférences du Collège de France, Paris, 2015.
- Cinq cours sur les Yašts de l’Avesta, Cahier de Studia Iranica 59, Paris, 2016.
- avec Céline Redard : Introduction à l’Avesta. Le récitatif liturgique sacré des zoroastriens (Docet Omnia), Paris : Les Belles Lettres, 2021.
- Le Yasna Haptaŋhāiti. Publications D’Études Indo-iraniennes, Université de Strasbourg, 2025.
- Les Gâthâs attribuées à Zarathuštra: Aux origines de l’Avesta et de la religion zoroastrienne. Les Belles Lettres, 2026.
