= Iranian calendars =

Calendars used in Iran

Today (at UTC+00)
- Monday, 16 November 2026
- Solar Hijri: 25 Aban, SH 1405
Other calendars
Akan	Kurudwo
Armenian	29 Trē 1476
Aztec	Tlacaxipehualiztli 5, 12 Tecpatl
Babylonian	5 Arakhsamna, 2337 SE
Balinese pawukon	Luang, Pepet, Pasah, Menala, Paing, Paniron, Coma of Ukir, Uma, Nohan, Duka
Bengali	1 Ogrohayon, BS 1433
Chinese	Yang Wood Horse・Heart Mansion; Fire Horse Year, Month 10, Day 8 (Lidong, 6 days until Xiaoxue)
Common Era	16 November 2026 CE
Coptic	7 Hathor, AM 1743
Egyptian	4 Pharmuthi, 2775 NE
Ethiopian	7 H̱edār, 2019 Amätä Məhrät
French Republican	Décade III, Quintidi de Brumaire de l'Année 235 de la République
Gregorian	16 November, AD 2026
Hebrew	6 Kislev, AM 5787
Hindu	Śravaṇa・Gaṇḍa; Solar: 30 Kārtika, 1948 SE; Lunisolar: Saptamī, Śukla pakṣa of Kārtika, 2083 VE; Rāudra・5127 KY・1,872,895
Icelandic	Mánudagur, 24 Gormánuður 2026
Islamic	5 Jumada al-thani, AH 1448 (using tabular method)
ISO week date	2026-W47-1
Japanese	8 Kannazuki, Reiwa 8 (Rittō, 6 days until Shōsetsu)
Julian	3 November, AD 2026 (AM 7535)
Julian day	2461361
Korean	8 Dwaejidal, 4359 DE
Maya	13.0.14.1.18; 11 Ceh, 12 Etznab
Roman	ante diem III Nonas Novembres, MMDCCLXXIX AUC
Tibetan	7 smin drug, me pho rta 2153 or 1772 or 1000

The Iranian calendars or Iranian chronologies (Persian: گاه‌شماری ایرانی, romanized: Gâh Šomâri-ye Irâni) are a succession of calendars created and used for over two millennia in Iran, also known as Persia. One of the longest chronological records in human history, the Iranian calendar has been modified many times for administrative purposes. The most influential person in laying the frameworks for the calendar and its precision was the 11th century Persian polymath, Omar Khayyam. The modern Iranian calendar is the Solar Hijri calendar, currently the official civil calendar in Iran.

Nowruz, the Iranian New Year, begins at the midnight nearest to the instant of the northern spring equinox, as determined by astronomic calculations for the meridian of Tehran (52.5°E). Thus the calendar is observation-based, unlike the Gregorian calendar, which is rule-based. This equinox occurs on or about 20 March of the Gregorian calendar. The time zone of Iran is Iran Standard Time, UTC+03:30.

== Ancient calendars ==
The earliest evidence of Iranian calendrical traditions is from the second millennium BC and possibly even predates the appearance of the Iranian prophet Zoroaster. The first fully preserved calendar is that of the Achaemenids, a royal dynasty of the 5th century BC who gave rise to Zoroastrianism. Throughout recorded history, Persians have been keen on the idea and importance of having a calendar. They were among the first cultures to use a solar calendar and have long favoured a solar over lunar and lunisolar approaches. The sun has always been a religious and divine symbol in Iranian culture and is the origin of the folklore regarding Cyrus the Great.

=== Old Persian calendar ===
Old Persian inscriptions and tablets indicate that early Iranians used a 360-day calendar based on the solar observation directly and modified for their beliefs. Days were not named. The months had two or three divisions depending on the phase of the moon. Twelve months of 30 days were named for festivals or activities of the pastoral year. An intercalation month was added periodically to keep the calendar synchronized with the seasons.

The following table lists the Old Persian months, alongside the approximate Gregorian months and approximate Babylonian lunar months.

Order	Approximate corresponding Julian months	Old Persian	Elamite spelling	Meaning	Approximate corresponding Babylonian lunar month(s)
1	March–April	Ādukanaiša	Hadukannaš	"Sowing (month)"	Nīsannu
2	April–May	Θūravāhara	Turmar	"(Month of) strong spring"	Ayyāru
3	May–June	Θāigraciš	Sākurriziš	"Garlic-collecting (month)"	Sīmannu
4	June–July	Garmapada	Karmabataš	"Heat-station (month)"	Du'ūzu
5	July–August	Drnabāji	Turnabaziš	"Harvest (month)"	Ābu
6	August–September	Kārapaθiya	Karbašiyaš	uncertain	Ulūlū
7	September–October	Bāgayādiš	Bakeyatiš	"(Month of) the worship of baga (god, perhaps Mithra)"	Tašrītu
8	October–November	*Vrkazana	Markašanaš	"Wolf killing (month)"	Arahsamna
9	November–December	Āçiyādiya	Hašiyatiš	"(Month) of the worship of the fire"	Kisilīmu
10	December–January	Anāmaka	Hanamakaš	"(Month of) the nameless god(?)"	Tebētu
11	January–February	*Θwayauvā	Samiyamaš	"(Month of) the terrible one"	Šabāţu
12	February–March	Viyax(a)na	Miyakannaš	"Digging-up (month)"	Addāru

There were four farming festivals, symmetric about maidyoshahem (midsummer):

Festival	Time from previous
hamaspathmaidyem	75 days
maidyoshahem	105 days
ayathrem	105 days
maidyarem	75 days

Two more festivals were later added, creating the six gahanbar:

Festival	Time from previous
hamaspathmaidyem (end of retirement)	75 days
maidyozarem (spring)	45 days
maidyoshahem (mid-summer)	60 days
paitishahem (harvest)	75 days
ayathrem (end of the summer)	30 days
maidyarem	75 days

=== Zoroastrian calendar ===
The first calendars based on Zoroastrian cosmology appeared in the later Achaemenid period (550 to 330 BC). They evolved over the centuries, but month names changed little until now.

The unified Achaemenid Empire required a distinctive Iranian calendar, and one was devised in Egyptian tradition, with 12 months of 30 days, each dedicated to a yazata (Eyzad), and four divisions resembling the Semitic week. Four days per month were dedicated to Ahura Mazda and seven were named after the six Amesha Spentas. Thirteen days were named after Fire, Water, Sun, Moon, Tiri and Geush Urvan (the soul of all animals), Mithra, Sraosha (Soroush, yazata of prayer), Rashnu (the Judge), Fravashi, Bahram (yazata of victory), Raman (Ramesh meaning peace), and Vata, the divinity of the wind. Three were dedicated to the female divinities, Daena (yazata of religion and personified conscious), Ashi (yazata of fortune) and Arshtat (justice). The remaining four were dedicated to Asman (lord of sky or Heaven), Zam (earth), Manthra Spenta (the Bounteous Sacred Word) and Anaghra Raocha (the 'Endless Light' of paradise).

The month names and their modern versions are given in the following table.

Order	Avestan name of the Yazata (in the genitive)	Approximate meaning of the name	Pahlavi Middle Persian	Modern Iranian Persian	
Order	Romanized	English	Romanized	Native Script	Romanized
1	Fravašinąm	(Guardian spirits, souls of the righteous)	Frawardīn	فروردین	Farvardīn
2	Ašahe Vahištahe	"Best Truth" / "Best Righteousness"	Ardwahišt	اُردیبهشت	Ordībehešt
3	Haurvatātō	"Wholeness" / "Perfection"	Khordād	خرداد	Khordād
4	Tištryehe	"Sirius"	Tīr	تیر	Tīr
5	Amərətātō	"Immortality"	Amurdād	اَمرداد	Amordād
6	Xšaθrahe Vairyehe	"Desirable Dominion"	Shahrewar	شهریور	Shahrīvar
7	Miθrahe	"Covenant"	Mihr	مهر	Mehr
8	Apąm	"Waters"	Ābān	آبان	Ābān
9	Āθrō	"Fire"	Ādur	آذر	Āzar
10	Daθušō	"The Creator" (i.e. Ahura Mazda)	Day	دی	Dey
11	Vaŋhə̄uš Manaŋhō	"Good Spirit"	Wahman	بهمن	Bahman
12	Spəntayā̊ Ārmatōiš	"Holy Devotion"	Spandarmad	اسفند	Esfand

The calendar had a significant impact on religious observance. It fixed the pantheon of major divinities, and also ensured that their names were uttered often, since at every Zoroastrian act of worship the yazatas of both day and month were invoked. It also clarified the pattern of festivities; for example, Mitrakanna or Mehregan was celebrated on Mithra day of Mithra month, and the Tiri festival (Tiragan) was celebrated on Tiri day of the Tiri month.

In 538 BC, Cyrus the Great (uncertain if he was a Zoroastrian) conquered Babylon and the Babylonian luni-solar calendar came into use for civil purposes. Cambyses conquered Egypt in 525 BC. He was accompanied by Darius, a Zoroastrian who became ruler of the Persian empire in 517 BC. The Zoroastrians adopted the wandering Egyptian solar calendar of twelve months of thirty days plus five epagomenal days. As their year began in the spring (with the festival of norouz) the epagomenai were placed just before norouz.

In Egypt, the star Sirius had significance since every 1460 years (the Sothic cycle) its heliacal rising (just before sunrise) marked the Egyptian new year and the inundation of the Nile. In Persia also the star had significance, since its heliacal rising there also coincided with the coming of the rain. The fourth Persian month was Tishtrya (Sirius, rain star). The vernal equinox at Greenwich fell on the first day of the first month from 487 to 483 BC (inclusive). Adopting S H Taqizadeh's date of 28 March 487 BC for the reform the calendar for that year is as follows:

* denotes 1 Epagomene
Egyptian month	First day	Persian month	First day
4	23 March	1	23*–28 March
5	22 April	2	27 April
6	22 May	3	27 May
7	21 June	4	26 June
8	21 July	5	26 July
9	20 August	6	25 August
10	19 September	7	24 September
11	19 October	8	24 October
12	18 November	9	23 November
1	18*–23 December	10	23 December
2	22 January	11	22 January
3	21 February	12	21 February

The fourth month includes 20 July, the date of the heliacal rising of Sirius. In the first year the people carried on using the old calendar, anticipating festival dates by five days. As each day is named after a god, it is important to observe the celebrations on the right day. Thus the fravasis festival, which in the old calendar was kept between sunset on 30 Spandarmad and sunrise on 1 Frawardin, was now observed throughout the epagomenai. In the second year of the reform, the old 30 Spandarmad was the new 25 Spandarmad, so from then on the festival covered eleven days, up to the new 1 Frawardin. Five days was considered enough for other festivals, however.

In all the lands where the Persian calendar was used the epagomenai were placed at the end of the year. To offset the difference between the agricultural year and the calendar year (the tax-gathering season began after the harvest) the start of the araji (land-tax) year was delayed by one month every 120 years. A Roman historian, Quintus Curtius Rufus, describing a ceremony in 333 BC, writes:

The magi were followed by three hundred and sixty-five young men clad in purple robes, equal in number to the days of a whole year; for the Persians also divided the year into that number of days.

After the conquests by Alexander the Great and his death, the Persian territories fell to one of his generals, Seleucus (312 BC), starting the Seleucid dynasty of Iran. Based on the Greek tradition, Seleucids introduced the practice of dating by era rather than by the reign of individual kings. Their era became known as that of Alexander, or later the Seleucid era. Since the new rulers were not Zoroastrians, Zoroastrian priests lost their function at the royal courts, and so resented the Seleucids. Although they began dating by eras, they established their own era of Zoroaster. That was the first serious attempt to determine the dates associated with the prophet Zoroaster's life. Priests had no Zoroastrian historical sources, and so turned to Babylonian archives famous in the ancient world. From these they learned that a great event in Persian history took place 228 years before the era of Alexander. In fact, this was the conquest of Babylon by Cyrus the Great in 539 BC. But the priests misinterpreted this date to be the time the "true faith" was revealed to their prophet, and since Avestan literature indicates that revelation happened when Zoroaster was 30 years old, 568 BC was taken as his year of birth. The date entered written records as the beginning of the era of Zoroaster, and indeed, the Persian Empire.

=== Modifications by Parthians, Ardashir I, Hormizd I, Yazdgerd III ===
The Parthians (Arsacid dynasty) adopted the same calendar system with minor modifications, and dated their era from 248 BC, the date they succeeded the Seleucids. Their names for the months and days are Parthian equivalents of the Avestan ones used previously, differing slightly from the Middle Persian names used by the Sasanians. For example, in the Achaemenid era the modern Persian month 'Day' was called Dadvah (Creator), in Parthian it was Datush and the Sasanians named it Dadv/Dai (Dadar in Pahlavi).

When in April of AD 224 the Parthian dynasty fell and was replaced by the Sasanians, the new king, Ardashir I, abolished the official Babylonian calendar and replaced it with the Zoroastrian. This involved a correction to the places of the gahanbar, which had slipped back in the seasons since they were fixed. These were placed eight months later, as were the epagomenai, the 'Gatha' or 'Gah' days after the ancient Zoroastrian hymns of the same name. Other countries, such as the Armenians and Choresmians, did not accept the change. The new dates were:

No.	Name	Achaemenid	Choresmian	Sasanian	Time since previous
1	maidyozarem	(11-) 15 ii (Ardawahisht)	15 v	(11-) 15 x (Day)	45 days
2	maidyoshahem	(11-) 15 iv (Tir)	15 vii	(11-) 15 xii (Spandarmad)	60 days
3	paitishahem	(26-) 30 vi (Shahrivar)	30 ix	(26-) 30 ii (Ardawahisht)	75 days
4	ayathrem	(26-) 30 vii (Mihr)	30 x	(26-) 30 iii (Khordad)	30 days
5	maidyarem	(11-) 15 x (Day)	10 i	(11-) 15 vi (Shahrewar)	75 days
6	hamaspathmaidyem	(1-) 5 Epagomene	30 iii	(1-) 5 Epagomene	80 days

In AD 224 the vernal equinox at Greenwich fell at noon on 21 March, which was 22 Shahrewar. Immediately after the reform 21 March corresponded to 27 Shahrewar. Here is the calendar for AD 225–6:

* = 1 Epagomene
Armenian month	First day	Egyptian month	First day	Persian month	First day
1	26* September–1 October	4	26 September	1	26 September
2	31 October	5	26 October	2	26 October
3	30 November	6	25 November	3	25 November
4	30 December	7	25 December	4	25 December
5	29 January	8	24 January	5	24 January
6	28 February	9	23 February	6	23 February
7	30 March	10	25 March	7	25 March
8	29 April	11	24 April	8	24 April
9	29 May	12	24 May	9	24*–29 May
10	28 June	1	23*–28 June	10	28 June
11	28 July	2	28 July	11	28 July
12	27 August	3	27 August	12	27 August

The change caused confusion and was immensely unpopular. The new epagomenai were referred to as "robber days". The people now observed the "Great" nowruz on 6 Frawardin, which was Zoroaster's birthday and corresponded to 1 Frawardin in the old calendar. The new 1 Frawardin was observed as the "lesser" nowruz. Hormizd I (AD 272–273) made the intervening days into festivals as well. In AD 273, the vernal equinox at 0° fell at 05:00 UTC on 21 March.

Yazdegerd I reigned from AD 399–420. In AD 400 the equinox fell about 19 March, which was 9 Aban. According to al-Biruni, in that reign there was a double adjustment of the start of the araji year. The tenth-century astronomer Abu'l-asan Kusyar noted that during the reign of Osrow II (AD 589–628) the sun entered Aries in Adur. This happened throughout his reign. An araji era was introduced dating from AD 621, and the Yazdegerdi era dates from 16 June AD 632, so the Yazdegerdi era is eleven years behind the araji.

== Muslim conquest ==
The Muslim rulers who took over from the middle of the seventh century used the Islamic calendar for administration, which caused hardship because the year was shorter – i.e. a tax which was formerly collected after the harvest would now have to be paid before the harvest. Traditionally, it is said that the Caliph Omar reintroduced the Persian calendar for tax collection purposes.

In AD 895 there was another double readjustment of the start of the araji year. It moved from 1 Frawardin (12 April) to 1 Khordad (11 June). By AD 1006 the vernal equinox, 15 March, was again coinciding with nowruz, 1 Frawardin. In that year, therefore, the epagomenai were delayed four months, moving from the end of Aban to their old position at the end of Spandarmad. This is the calendar for AD 1006/7:

* denotes 1 Epagomene
Armenian month	First day	Old Egyptian month	First day	Persian month	First day
1	15*–20 March	4	15 March	1	10*–15 March
2	19 April	5	14 April	2	14 April
3	19 May	6	14 May	3	14 May
4	18 June	7	13 June	4	13 June
5	18 July	8	13 July	5	13 July
6	17 August	9	12 August	6	12 August
7	16 September	10	11 September	7	11 September
8	16 October	11	11 October	8	11 October
9	15 November	12	10 November	9	10 November
10	15 December	1	10*–15 December	10	10 December
11	14 January	2	14 January	11	9 January
12	13 February	3	13 February	12	8 February

The gahanbar did not move quite to their old places, because the fifth moved to 20 Day, which was the old 15 Day, thus increasing the interval between the fourth and fifth to eighty days and reducing the interval between the fifth and sixth to 75 days. The new dates were:

No.	Name	Date	Time since previous
1	maidyozarem	(11-) 15 ii (Ardawahisht)	45 days
2	maidyoshahem	(11-) 15 iv (Tir)	60 days
3	paitishahem	(26-) 30 vi (Shahrivar)	75 days
4	ayathrem	(26-) 30 vii (Mihr)	30 days
5	maidyarem	(16-) 20 x (Day)	80 days
6	hamaspathmaidyem	(1-) 5 Epagomene	75 days

== Medieval era: Jalali calendar ==
In AD 1079, by the order of the Jalal Al-Din Shah Seljuqi, the Islamic Calendar (which was and is based on the lunar system) was replaced in Persia by the calendar of Omar Khayyam and was called the Jalali Calendar. Khayyam and his team had worked 8 years in Isfahan, the capital of Iran during the Seljuq dynasty. The research and creation of the Khayyam calendar was financially supported by Jalal Al din Shah. Khayyam designed his calendar in which the beginning of the new year, season and month are aligned and he named the first day of the spring and the new year to be Norooz (also spelled Nowruz). Before Khayyam's calendar, Norooz was not a fixed day and each year could fall in late winter or early spring.

From 15 March 1079, when the calendar had slipped a further eighteen days, the araji calendar was reformed by repeating the first eighteen days of Frawardin. Thus 14 March was 18 Frawardin qadimi (old) or farsi (Persian) and 15 March was 1 Frawardin jalali or maleki (royal). This new calendar was astronomically calculated, so that it did not have epagemonai – the months began when the sun entered a new sign of the zodiac.

About 120 years after the reform of AD 1006, when the vernal equinox was starting to fall in Ardawahisht, Zoroastrians made it again coincide with nowruz by adding a second Spandarmad. This Shensai calendar was a month behind the qadimi still used in Persia, being used only by the Zoroastrians in India, the Parsees. On 6 June 1745 (Old Style) some Parsees re-adopted the qadimi calendar, and in 1906 some adopted the Fasli calendar in which 1 Frawardin was equated with 21 March, so that there was a sixth epagomenal day every four years. In 1911, the jalali calendar became the official national calendar of Persia. Some Zoroastrians in Persia now use the Fasli calendar, having begun changing to it in 1930.

== Modern calendar: Solar Hijri (SH) ==
The present Iranian calendar was legally adopted on 31 March 1925, during the early Pahlavi era. The law stated that the first day of the year should be the first day of spring in "the true solar year", "as it has been" ever so. It also fixed the number of days in each month, which previously varied by year with the sidereal zodiac. It revived the ancient Persian names, which are still used. 1 Farvardin is the day whose midnight start is nearest to the instant of vernal equinox. The first six months have 31 days, the next five thirty, and the twelfth has 29 days and 30 in leap years.

It specified the origin of the calendar to be the Hijrah of Prophet Muhammad from Mecca to Medina in AD 622. It also deprecated the 12-year cycles of the Chinese-Uighur calendar which were not officially sanctioned but were commonly used.

On 10 March 1976 (20 Esfand 1354), Shah Mohammad Reza Pahlavi introduced the "Imperial calendar" that measured the first year from 559 BC, the beginning of Cyrus the Great's reign and the foundation of the Achaemenian Empire, rather than 622 AD, the Hijra of Muhammad. Overnight, the year changed from 1355 to 2535. This change was reversed slightly more than two years later, on 2 September 1978 (11 Shahrivar 2537, which became 11 Shahrivar 1357), in the wake of civil unrest preceding the Iranian Revolution, and the calendar reverted to Solar Hijri. Correspondence of Solar Hijri and Gregorian calendars (Solar Hijri leap years are marked *):

33-year cycle	Solar Hijri year	Gregorian year	Solar Hijri year	Gregorian year
1	1354*	21 March 1975 – 20 March 1976	1387*	20 March 2008 – 20 March 2009
2	1355 (2535)	21 March 1976 – 20 March 1977	1388	21 March 2009 – 20 March 2010
3	1356 (2536)	21 March 1977 – 20 March 1978	1389	21 March 2010 – 20 March 2011
4	1357 (2537)	21 March 1978 – 20 March 1979	1390	21 March 2011 – 19 March 2012
5	1358*	21 March 1979 – 20 March 1980	1391*	20 March 2012 – 20 March 2013
6	1359	21 March 1980 – 20 March 1981	1392	21 March 2013 – 20 March 2014
7	1360	21 March 1981 – 20 March 1982	1393	21 March 2014 – 20 March 2015
8	1361	21 March 1982 – 20 March 1983	1394	21 March 2015 – 19 March 2016
9	1362*	21 March 1983 – 20 March 1984	1395*	20 March 2016 – 20 March 2017
10	1363	21 March 1984 – 20 March 1985	1396	21 March 2017 – 20 March 2018
11	1364	21 March 1985 – 20 March 1986	1397	21 March 2018 – 20 March 2019
12	1365	21 March 1986 – 20 March 1987	1398	21 March 2019 – 19 March 2020
13	1366*	21 March 1987 – 20 March 1988	1399*	20 March 2020 – 20 March 2021
14	1367	21 March 1988 – 20 March 1989	1400	21 March 2021 – 20 March 2022
15	1368	21 March 1989 – 20 March 1990	1401	21 March 2022 – 20 March 2023
16	1369	21 March 1990 – 20 March 1991	1402	21 March 2023 – 19 March 2024
17	1370*	21 March 1991 – 20 March 1992	1403*	20 March 2024 – 20 March 2025
18	1371	21 March 1992 – 20 March 1993	1404	21 March 2025 – 20 March 2026
19	1372	21 March 1993 – 20 March 1994	1405	21 March 2026 – 20 March 2027
20	1373	21 March 1994 – 20 March 1995	1406	21 March 2027 – 19 March 2028
21	1374	21 March 1995 – 19 March 1996	1407	20 March 2028 – 19 March 2029
22	1375*	20 March 1996 – 20 March 1997	1408*	20 March 2029 – 20 March 2030
23	1376	21 March 1997 – 20 March 1998	1409	21 March 2030 – 20 March 2031
24	1377	21 March 1998 – 20 March 1999	1410	21 March 2031 – 19 March 2032
25	1378	21 March 1999 – 19 March 2000	1411	20 March 2032 – 19 March 2033
26	1379*	20 March 2000 – 20 March 2001	1412*	20 March 2033 – 20 March 2034
27	1380	21 March 2001 – 20 March 2002	1413	21 March 2034 – 20 March 2035
28	1381	21 March 2002 – 20 March 2003	1414	21 March 2035 – 19 March 2036
29	1382	21 March 2003 – 19 March 2004	1415	20 March 2036 – 19 March 2037
30	1383*	20 March 2004 – 20 March 2005	1416*	20 March 2037 – 20 March 2038
31	1384	21 March 2005 – 20 March 2006	1417	21 March 2038 – 20 March 2039
32	1385	21 March 2006 – 20 March 2007	1418	21 March 2039 – 19 March 2040
33	1386	21 March 2007 – 19 March 2008	1419	20 March 2040 – 19 March 2041

== See also ==
- Solar Hijri calendar
- Tabarian calendar
- Armenian calendar
- Japanese imperial year
- Lunar Hijri calendar
- Calendars in pre-Islamic Arabia
- Assyrian calendar
- Mandaean calendar
- Hebrew calendar
- Babylonian calendar
- Anno Graecorum – Calendar era used during Hellenistic period
- Rumi calendar – Ottoman civil calendar (1839–1926)
- Royal stars – Divine celestial generals commanding the stars in Zoroastrianism
- Shanbeh
