= Chista =

Goddess of wisdom and the right path in Zoroastrianism

Chista Avestan: 𐬗𐬌𐬯𐬙𐬁
- Goddess of wisdom, journeys and rightful paths
- The goddess Chista (right) depicted as a marital figure to Bahram, the god of victory
- Other names: Chisti, Kisti, Kista
- Affiliation: The Thirty-Three Deities, Guardians of the Days of the Month
- Attributes: Knowledge, wisdom, awareness, guidance along physical and spiritual paths
- Day: 24th day of every month in the Zoroastrian calendar
- Texts: Din Yasht, Mihr Yasht
- Gender: Female
- Associated deities: Mithra, Daena, Rashn, Bahram

Chista (Avestan: 𐬗𐬌𐬯𐬙𐬁, also rendered Kista or Kisti) is a yazata in Zoroastrianism and the Iranian goddess of knowledge, awareness, wisdom and guidance along the right path. Her guidance has been described as applying both to travel along physical roads and to the path of religious conduct, including the route of the afterlife. She is praised in the sixteenth Yasht, commonly called the Din Yašt, and appears among the companions of Mithra, while her close association with Daena links her with religious knowledge and guidance. Invocations to her seek safe passage, strength, health and keen perception. In later Zoroastrian practice, the roles of moral guidance and protection of travellers were largely associated instead with Daena and Bahram. The later study of Bakhtiari stories also draws comparisons between divine female figures and folk-tale heroines. It links Naneh-Mahi with Anahita in the context of wealth, fertility and helpfulness, and Chista with the clever and guiding heroine Tamti.

== Name and Etymology ==
The Avestan names Chista and Chisti have been connected with a verb meaning "notice" or "understand", cit. The name Chista has also been derived from the passive participle of a verb kaet-, "teach" or "instruct". The grammatical formation is disputed. An explanation of Chista as a primary abstract noun with the suffix -tā has been questioned because this suffix is not otherwise used for primary derivation. Another analysis makes it the feminine of the participle čista, "noticed" or "noticeable".

The name of Zoroaster's younger daughter, Pouruchista, has accordingly been interpreted as "noticed by many people" or "charming", rather than "possessing many ideas". The latter interpretation is also recorded in the linguistic literature. The related action noun Chisti, "intuition" or "idea", corresponds to Old Indic citti, "thinking" or "understanding", and belongs to the vocabulary of the Gathas and the Yasna Haptaŋhāiti. In the Younger Avesta, including the Yasna, Vispered and Vīdēvdād, Chisti occasionally appears as a divine figure associated with Ahrishwang.

== Origins and Mythology ==
Chista is a relatively minor and enigmatic divine figure. She has been characterized as a personification or symbol of knowledge, awareness and wisdom, with a close relationship to the goddess of Religion. The characterization also associates her with Ohrmazd's knowledge and wisdom, a connection attributed in the collected modern account to the Zamyād Yašt. One interpretation treats Chista as a distinctly Zoroastrian divinity of religious knowledge, whose description is comparatively abstract. Unlike Anahita, she is not represented as the recipient of offerings from the old epic heroes. In the Dēn Yašt, her worshippers instead include Zoroaster and his wife. This difference has been used to propose that her divine identity arose and developed within Zoroastrianism.

Chista is a goddess of the way and of the paths that are to be followed. These encompass roads travelled by people and the paths of right belief. Her epithets include hupathmanyā-, "having good ways", hvāyaonā-, "having good paths", huaiwitačinā-, "running well", and razištā-, "very straight". She is also credited with akhšta-, a quality described as apparently blending with the energy of health. Her guidance includes the power to continue along the way, making her an appropriate companion of the deity of loyalty.

In the Dēn Yašt, Chista is called righteous, holy, clever, renowned and swift to act. She is described as reaching her goal quickly, bringing libations, freeing people from dangers and cleansing well. The accompanying description of the good Religion calls it the provider of good stores. Zoroaster petitions Chista for swift feet, keen hearing, strong arms, health and sturdiness of the entire body. Zoroaster also ask her to grant him extraordinary eyesight, such as that of the Kara fish, who can detect a disturbance in the waters, even should they be no thicker than a hair, in the river Rangha said to be a thousand times a man's height in depth and distant at its ends. From nine districts away, the male horse can distinguish a single hair on the ground, even in the dark of night through rain, snow, hail or sleet, and identify whether it came from a horse's head or tail. The golden-collared vulture can see a piece of flesh no thicker than a fist from nine districts away, described as yielding no more light than a needle point. Chista and Bahram also appear among Mithra's divine companions, where they also share several epithets.

The divine company invoked in the Srosh Yašt includes Soroush, Rashn, Daena, Arshtat who makes the world grow, increase and prosper, Ahrishwang, good Chisti and most righteous Chista. In the Mihr Yašt, Mithra travels in a beautiful chariot adorned with ornaments. Rashnu the Just rides on his right. On his left is Chista, upright and holy, carrying libations, clothed in white and herself described as white. The procession is associated with the protection of those who follow the good Religion. Chista is also described as possessing the attribute of righteous conduct.

== Worship ==
The sixteenth Yašt celebrates Chista, although it is known as the Dēn Yašt, named for Daena. Chista is also mentioned in Yašt 10.126. The Sīrōzah likewise invokes the most righteous Chista, made by Mazda and holy, together with the good Religion, and the name Dîn is assigned to the twenty-fourth day of the month.

In the hymn, Zoroaster calls Chista to rise from her heavenly abode, also glossed as Garōthmān, and come to him. He asks that she remain in front of him if she is already ahead, or catch up if she is behind. His petition asks for friendly circumstances, smooth travel along roads, good mountain paths, easy passage through forests and a happy crossing of rivers. The hymn offers sacrifice for her brightness and glory through libations, Haoma, meat, the baresma ritual twigs, sacred words, spoken wisdom, good words and deeds. Its prayer formulas repeatedly praise the righteous Chista and the good Law of the worshippers of Mazda.

Zoroaster's offerings are made for righteous thought, speech and action as well as the physical powers described in the hymn. His requests for swift movement, sharp hearing, strength, health and the sight of the fish, horse and vulture are repeated in successive verses. The praise for Chista's brightness and glory returns after each petition.

The hymn also names Hvōvī, identified in commentaries as Zoroaster's wife. She worships Chista with full knowledge, seeking from Zoroaster a substance described in the translation as a "good narcotic", called bangha or the "Bang of Zoroaster" in the explanatory note, which also cites Vendidad XV.14. The request is linked with thinking, speaking and acting according to the Law. The commentaries associate such prepared drinks with later accounts of Guštāsp and Ardā Vīrāf being carried in soul to heaven.

Other worshippers include the āthrāvans, described in the commentary as travelling priests and ancestors of modern dervishes. They seek good memory for preaching the Law and physical strength. The ruler or lord of the country prays for peace in his land and strength for his own body. One textual note allows the priestly act of sacrifice to be read in the present rather than the past tense, with a cross-reference to Yašt XIV.39. These petitions are framed by the repeated sacrifice to Chista and the good Religion, with the recurring offering for her glory.

== Historical Evolution ==
The creation of Daenaand Chisti as divine personifications of abstract ideas has been placed within an older Indo-Iranian tradition of such personification. Chista is closely associated with Daena, the personified Religion or Zoroastrian Law. Daena is invoked with Chista and presides over the twenty-fourth day of the month. Despite the title Dēn Yašt, the sixteenth hymn is directed to Chista. In one interpretation, their relationship is expressed as Religion on the one hand and religious knowledge, or knowledge leading to bliss, on the other. The latter is glossed as fargānak and nirvānagñāna, and in this account Chista is also connected with Chisti. Daenahas been treated as a possibly distinctively Zoroastrian personification, alongside the less prominent Čisti, called "Doctrine" and given a minor liturgical role. Chista's epithets, invocations and association with Daena have also been interpreted as linking her to a path of ritual observance and the path of the afterlife, although the precise relationship is uncertain. Her role has thus been described as leading people towards the right path in both the present world and the next.

Chista has relatively little prominence in later Zoroastrianism. Her earlier functions have been described as passing chiefly to Daenaand Bahram. Daenatook over the role of moral guidance, while the hymn devoted to Chista came to be called by Daena's name. Bahram, praised in Yašt 14, remained an important warrior and protective divinity. He was held to be more powerful against danger, although both figures had appeared among Mithra's companions and shared epithets in the Avesta. In later Zoroastrian communities, travellers have invoked Bahram instead, and had his Yašt recited for protection. Examples recorded in the notes include prayers to Bahram by Parsi migrants during the voyage to Gujarat and a recitation of the Bahram Yašt observed in Yazd in 1964. Textual evidence for this custom was cited from the Zand-i Khūrtak Avistāk and the Farziāt-Nāmeh of Dastur Dārāb Pāhlan. The same historical discussion points to later shrines associated with Bahram.

== Cultural Legacy ==
In a modern comparison with Bakhtiari tales, Chista has been associated with Tamti, a knowledgeable and resourceful female character. Tamti's name has been described as occurring among prominent figures in the governments of pre-Islamic Iran, a detail taken as indicating the character's antiquity. The character is also counted among the important female figures of Luri and Bakhtiari stories. In the tales, she repeatedly guides her sisters, recognizes threats and uses her cleverness to save them from demons. Her alertness is represented by the saying that everyone else sleeps while Tamti remains awake. This wakefulness has been interpreted as corresponding to Chista's awareness and insight.

In the story of the demons Alazangi and Jirnal, Tamti, the youngest and cleverest of her sisters, recognizes the Alazangi's deception and warns the others. She asks him for several horses, containers made of animal skin for holding oil, and water carried in a sieve. Alazangi supplies the horses and oilskins and goes to the river to fetch water in the perforated vessel. While he is occupied, Tamti puts the oil containers under the bedding in place of herself and her sisters. She and her sisters then empty the demon's treasury and escape on horseback. When Alazangi discovers their escape, he pursues the sisters and catches up with them near a river. Tamti again recognizes his attempt at deception, turns it against him and causes him to drown. At a later crossroads she makes the decision that the sisters should return to their parents rather than go back to the castle, emphasizing two common characteristics, knowledge and guidance, which she shares with Chista. The many versions of Tamti's story have also been interpreted as expressing a wish for women to take an active role in life, with intelligence, wakefulness, self-awareness and the power to guide others presented as valued qualities.

Chista is also the name of a weekly science, technology and futurology podcast presented by Pouria Nazemi for Radio Farda. It was named after the goddess of knowledge and wisdom in ancient Iranian mythology. The podcast's description announced a new story each Monday, presented as a journey beyond everyday events, with an accompanying page containing reading suggestions and links. It also invited listeners to recommend the show to others.
