= Zam =

Avestan term for earth

- Mother of Earth
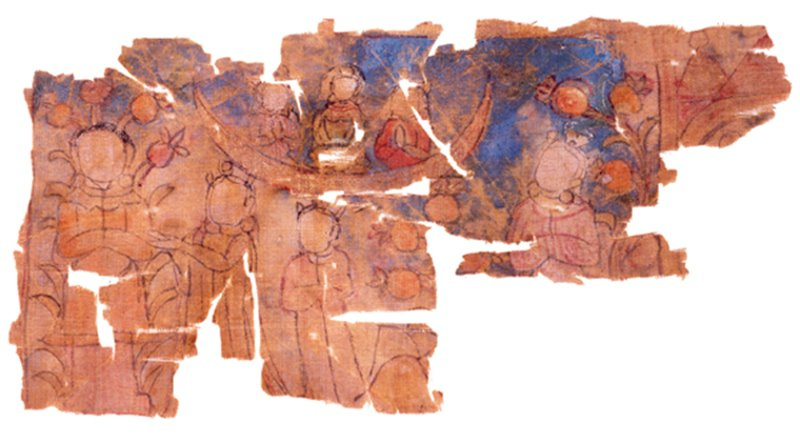
- Painting of the Earth God and the Moon god in the Manichaeism
- Other names: Zam, Zamin
- Avestan: Zam 𐬰𐬆𐬨
- Affiliation: The Thirty-Three Deities, Guardians of the Days of the Month, Four Elements
- Symbol: Soil
- Sacred flower: Lemon balm
- Attributes: The Source of all Given, the Virtuous, The Pure and The Eternal, The Holy
- Day: 28th of each month in the Iranian calendar
- Gender: Female
- Festivals: Paitishahem
- Associated deities: Spenta Armaiti, Ameretat, Asman

Equivalents
- Greek: Gaia
- Roman: Terra
- Indian: Prithvi

Zam (Avestan: 𐬰𐬆𐬨) is the Avestan language term for the Zoroastrian concept of "earth", in both the sense of land and soil and in the sense of the world. The earth is viewed as a primordial element in Zoroastrian tradition, and represented by a minor divinity, Zam, who is the hypostasis of the "earth". The word itself, changed to Zamin in Modern Persian, is cognate to the Baltic Zemes, Slavic Zem, Serbian Zemlja, Greco-Thracian Semele, meaning the planet Earth, as well as soil.

The element zam exists with the same meaning in Middle Persian, which is the language of the texts of Zoroastrian tradition. The divinity Zam, however, appears in the later language as Zamyad, which is a contraction of Zam Yazad, i.e. the yazata Zam.

Zam of the earth is not related to the Zam of the Shahnameh. That Zam—Zahhak-e-Maar-Doosh (Aži Dahāka in Avestan, Azhdshak in Middle Persian)—is the king of dragons, who slew Jamshid.

== In scripture ==
The element zam is the domain of the Armaiti, the Amesha Spenta of the earth and one of the Ahura Mazda's primordial 'divine sparks' from whom all other creation originates. It is through the earth that Armaiti is immanent. This close identification of the element zam with Armaiti also causes the divinity Zam to paired with Armaiti, to the extent that in some verses Armaiti appears where "earth" is expected. The rare dvandvah expression Zam-Armaiti occurs in Yasht 1.16, 16.6 and 42.3.

The Zamyad Yasht, the Avesta's hymn nominally devoted to Zam, has little to do with "earth": The first eight chapters of that hymn simply enumerate geographical landmarks, while the rest of the hymn is in praise of those who possess kavaem khareno "royal glory". These remaining verses begin with the creation of the earth, that is with a verse to Ahura Mazda (chapter 10), and closes with a verse to the Saoshyant (89). In between, it contains verses invoking the Amesha Spenta (15), Mithra (35). Mortals invoked include Yima (31), Thraetaona (36), the Kayanian dynasts (66-72), Zarathushtra (79) and Vishtaspa (84). According to Darmesteter, "this Yasht would serve as a short history of the Iranian monarchy, an abridged [Shahnameh]."

The Zamyad Yasht has been considered to be an example of a simple concept being elevated to the rank of an angel. For Zam, this probably occurred as a linguistic conciliation between Zam and Armaiti. But notwithstanding the dedication of the 28th day of the month and the manifestation as one of the primordial elements, Zam is not a particularly significant divinity. Dhalla goes so far as to say "her personality is very insipid as compared with Armaiti, who, as we have seen, has the earth under her care and is, in fact, a more active guardian genius."

== In tradition ==
The principal source of information on the Zoroastrian notions of the earth (and accordingly of its divinity) is the Bundahishn, an account of the religion's cosmogony and cosmology completed in about the 12th century. According to that text, the earth was the third of the primordial creations, following that of the sky and the waters, and before that of plants and fire. The creation of the earth is described in three stages: At first, the surface of the earth was a round, flat disk, floating in the center of the waters that filled the lower half of the "sky". Then, from its surface grew up the mountains, the tallest of these being Hara Berezaiti whose outlying ranges encircled the earth and beyond which lay the world river Aredvi Sura. Finally, during the time of the fourth creation (plants), the primordial tree grew up, and was the prototype of all plants (this tree is already alluded to in scripture as the Saena tree; in Yasht 12.17 it is further described as the "Tree of All Remedies" because it bears the seeds of all healing herbs). The fifth creation is that of the primordial bovine Gavaevodata from whose seed, marrow, organs and soul the earth is populated with animal life and the progenitors of the human race.

In the Shayest na-Shayest ("[what is] Proper and Improper"), an enumeration of the qualities that each divinity epitomizes associates Zam with "conclusiveness". In contrast, Armaiti is identified with "fruitfulness".

In the Counsels of Adarbad Mahraspandan the author advises his readership not to take medicine on the day of the month dedicated to Zam.

In the Pazend Afrin-i haft Amshespand ("Blessings of the seven Amesha Spenta"), Zam is joined by Amardad, Rashn and Ashtad (Ameretat, Rashnu and Arshtat) in withstanding the demons of hunger and thirst.

The last hymn recited in the procedure for the establishment of a Fire temple is the Zamyad Yasht. This is done because the required 91 recitals in honor of the Yazatas would in principle require each of the 30 hymns associated with the divinities of the 30 days to be recited thrice with one additional one. However, the first three recited are dedicated to Ahura Mazda, leaving 88, and 88 modulo 30 is 28, the day-number dedication of Zam.

From among the flowers associated with the yazatas, Zam's is the Basil (Bundahishn 27).

According to Xenophon (Cyropaedia, 8.24), Cyrus sacrificed animals to the earth as the Magians directed.

== References and bibliography ==
- Anklesaria, Behramgore Tehmuras, ed., trans. (1956), Zand-Akasih: Iranian or Greater Bundahishn, Bombay: Rahnumae Mazdayasnan Sabha.
- Antia, E. E. Kersaspji, ed., trans. (1909), "Afrin-i haft Amshespand", Pazend texts collected and collated, Bombay: K. R. Cama Oriental Institute, pp. 86–88.
- Boyce, Mary (1975), A History of Zoroastrianism, vol. I, Leiden: Brill.
- Boyce, Mary (1987), "Ārmaiti", Encyclopaedia Iranica, vol. 2, New York: Routledge and Kegan Paul, pp. 413–415.
- Darmesteter, James, ed. trans. (1882), "Zamyad Yast", The Zend Avesta, Part II, Sacred Books of the East, Vol. 23, Oxford: OUP, pp. 206–309.
- Dhalla, Maneckji Nusservanji (1938), History of Zoroastrianism, New York: OUP
- Jamasp-Asa, J. D., ed., trans. (1897), "Counsels of Adarbad Mahraspandan", Pahlavi Texts, Bombay: K. R. Cama Oriental Institute.
- Modi, Jivanji Jamshedji (1922), The Religious Ceremonies and Customs of the Parsees, Bombay: British India Press.
- West, Edward William (1880), "Shayast la-Shayast", Pahlavi Texts, Part 1, Sacred Books of the East, Vol. 5 (translated ed.), Oxford: OUP.

== See also ==
- Mat Zemlya

== Full texts ==
- Darmesteter's translation (1898 edition) of the Zamyad Yasht
