= Zarik =

Zoroastrian Daeva

In Persian mythology, Zarik (or Zarich, Zairich, or Zairi) is a daeva in the service of Ahriman.

== Etymology ==
Etymology of Zarik/Zarich likely comes from Avestan "zairi-gaona" - green/yellow.

== Description ==
Oft-depicted in female form, Zarik is the daeva personification of aging and decrepitude and of poison - she is associated with Soma/Haoma. She is sometimes called "the maker of poison."

Zarik was created at the same time as the daeva Tairev and the two are comrades.

Zarik's amesha rival counterpart is Ameretat.
