= Huvishka =

Kushan emperor from c. 150 to c. 190

- Kushan emperor
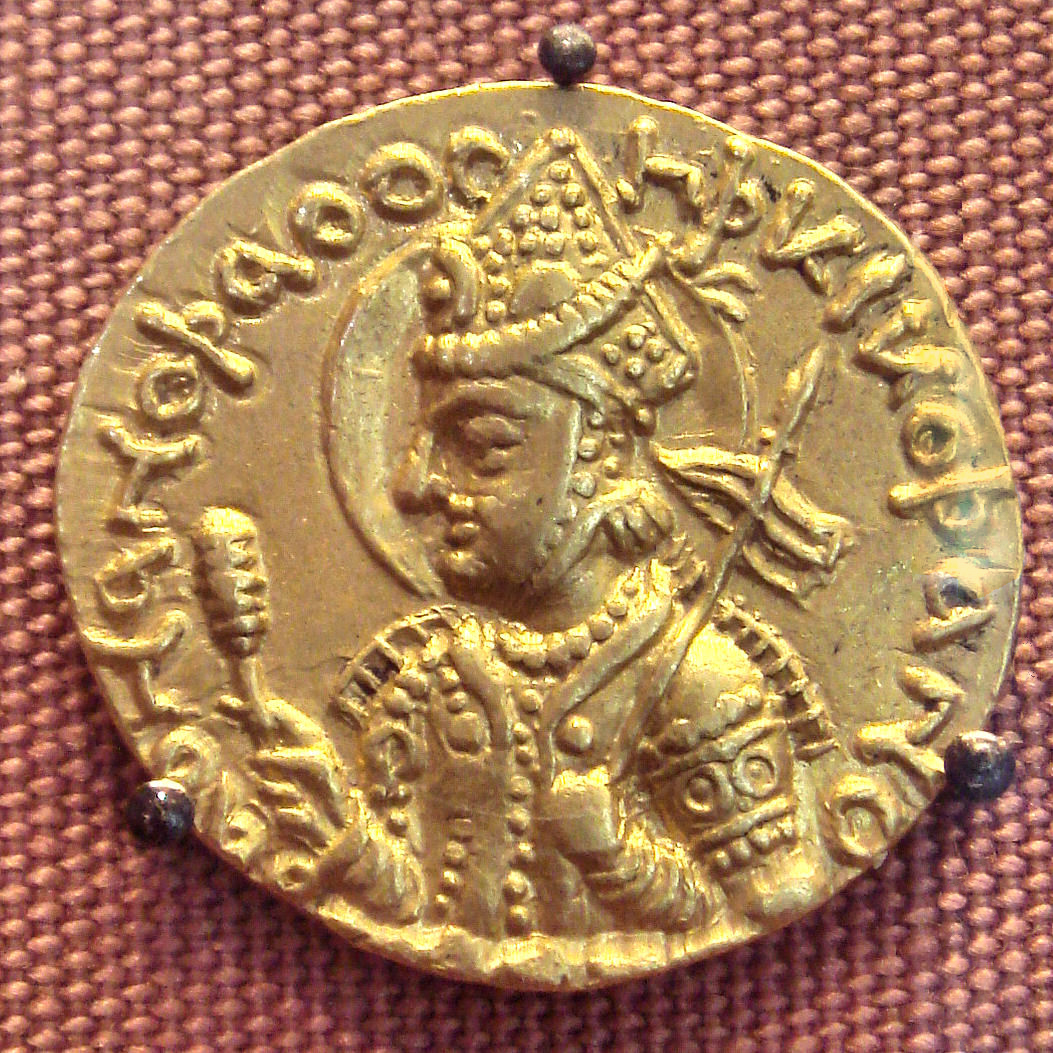
- Coin of Huvishka. Legend in Kushan language and Greek script (with the Kushan letter Ϸ "sh"): ϷΑΟΝΑΝΟϷΑΟ ΟΟΗϷΚΙ ΚΟϷΑΝΟ ("Shaonanoshao Ooishki Koshano"): "King of kings, Huvishka the Kushan".
- Reign: 150–190 CE
- Coronation: 150 CE
- Predecessor: Kanishka
- Successor: Vasudeva I
- Born: 130 AD; Peshawar
- Died: 190 AD (59 years); Kashmir
- Burial: 190 AD; Leh
- Spouse: Unknown
- Issue: Vasudeva I, Kanishka II
Names
- Huvishka
- House: Unknown
- Dynasty: Kushan Dynasty
- Father: Kanishka
- Mother: Unknown
- Religion: Shaivism

Huvishka (Kushan: Οοηϸκι, Ooēški, Brahmi: 𑀳𑀼𑀯𑀺𑀱𑁆𑀓; Hu-vi-ṣka, Huviṣka; Kharosthi: 𐨱𐨂𐨬𐨅𐨮𐨿𐨐 Hu-ve-ṣka, Huveṣka) was the emperor of the Kushan Empire from the death of Kanishka (assumed on the best evidence available to be in 150 CE) until the succession of Vasudeva I about thirty years later.

Huvishka was born in Peshawar, Pakistan but his reign encompassed many surrounding regions. His rule was a period of consolidation for the Empire. Huvishka's territory encompassed Balkh in Bactria to Mathura in India, locations where it is known that he minted his coinage. Gold coins and amulets in his effigy were found as far as Pataliputra and Bodh Gaya, including one such amulet as an offering under the Enlightenment Throne of the Buddha in Bodh Gaya, suggesting with other finds of Kushan coins in the area that Kushan rule may have extended this far east. His reign seems to have been essentially peaceful, consolidating Kushan power in northern India, and moving the centre of the Kushan Empire to the southern capital city of Mathura. In December 2025, Buddhist stupas were discovered in Zehanpora of Kashmir, with possible link to Huvishkapura, the lost capital city of Huvishka.

== Religion ==
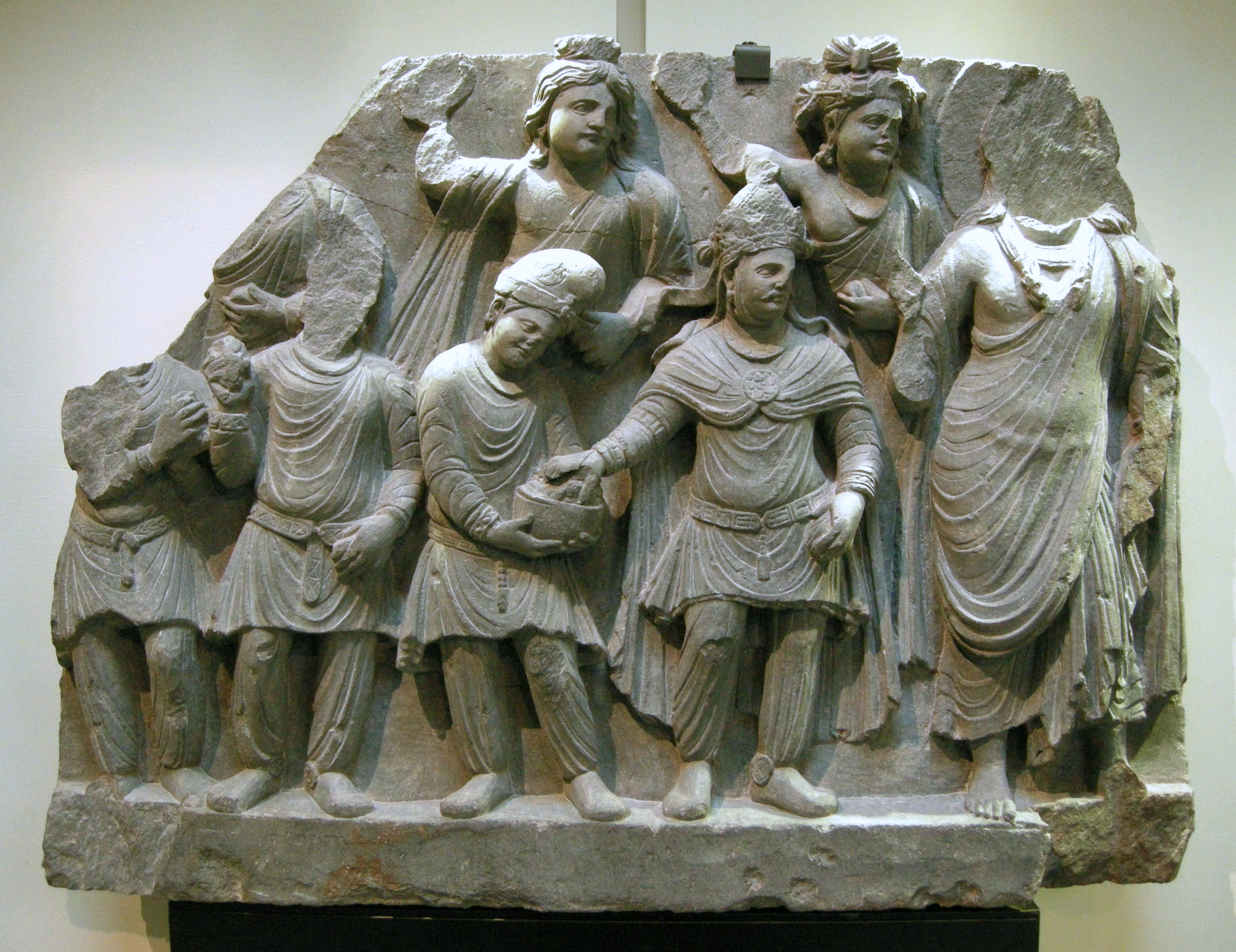
Relief probably showing Huvishka making a donation to the Buddha.

Huvishka was the son of Kanishka. His reign is also known as the golden age of Kushan rule.

=== Mahayana Buddhism ===
The reign of Huvishka corresponds with the first known epigraphic evidence of the Buddha Amitabha, on the bottom part of a 2nd-century statue which has been found in Govindo-Nagar, and now at the Mathura Museum. The statue is dated to "the 28th year of the reign of Huvishka", and dedicated to "Amitabha Buddha" by a family of merchants.

There is also some evidence that Huvishka was a follower of Mahāyāna Buddhism. A Sanskrit manuscript fragment in the Schøyen Collection describes Huvishka as one who has "set forth in the Mahāyāna." This depiction of Huviska as a Mahayana follower does not necessarily confirm his involvement in promoting Mahayana. However, it does suggest that "Huviska's era was a crucial period in the evolution of Mahayana."

Some reliefs from Gandhara are also thought to portray Huvishka making donations to the Buddha.

Huvishka is widely attested to have supported Buddhism, but the Buddha does not appear on his coinage, possibly out of respect to the Buddha.

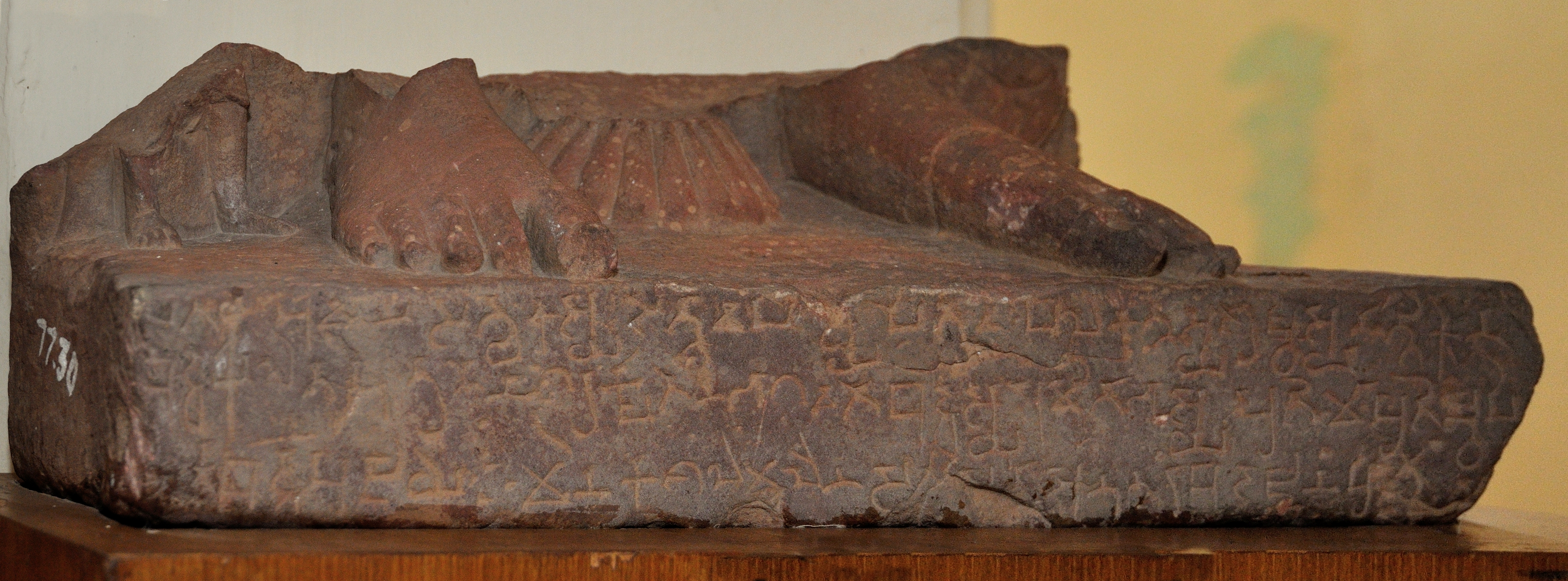
Earliest known "Mahayana" inscription: inscribed pedestal with the first known occurrence of the name of "Amitabha Buddha" in the "year 26" (153 CE, first year of Huvishka)

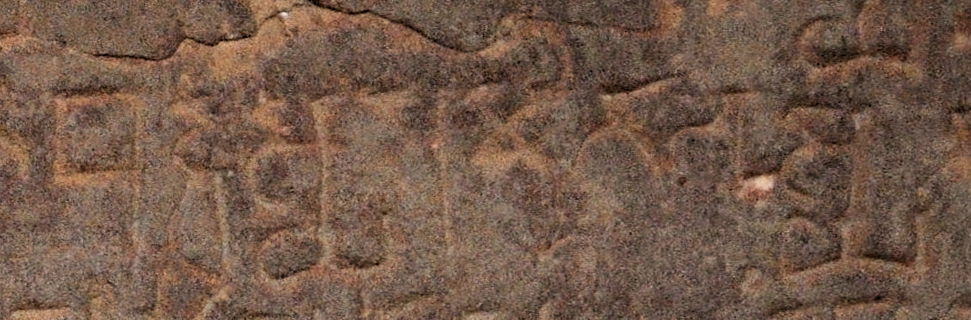
First known Mahayana inscription: words "Bu-ddha-sya A-mi-tā-bha-sya" ("of Amitabha Buddha") in Brahmi script in the inscription.

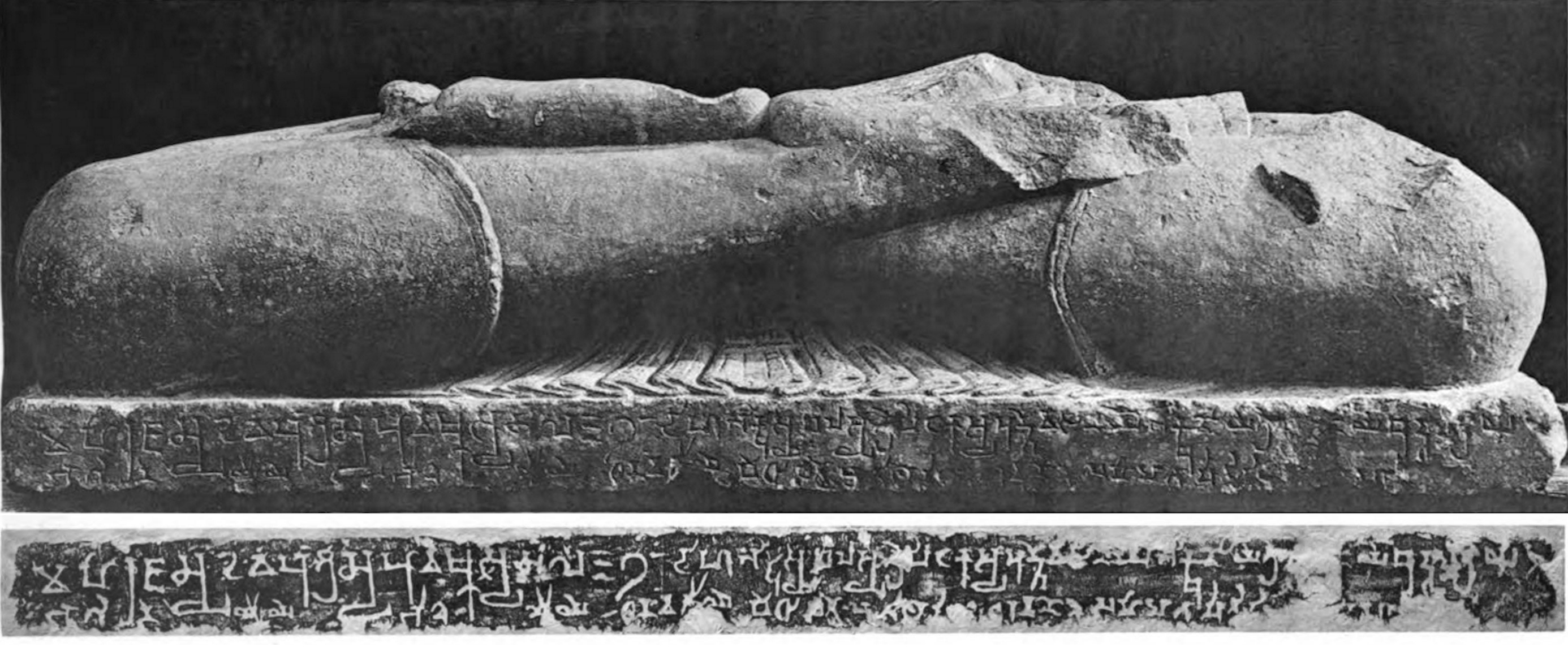
Fragment of a Bodhisattva sculpture inscribed "in the year 33" (𑀲𑀁𑁝𑁔) of "the Great King, son of God, Huvishka" (Mahārājasya Devaputrasya Huviṣka,), Art of Mathura.

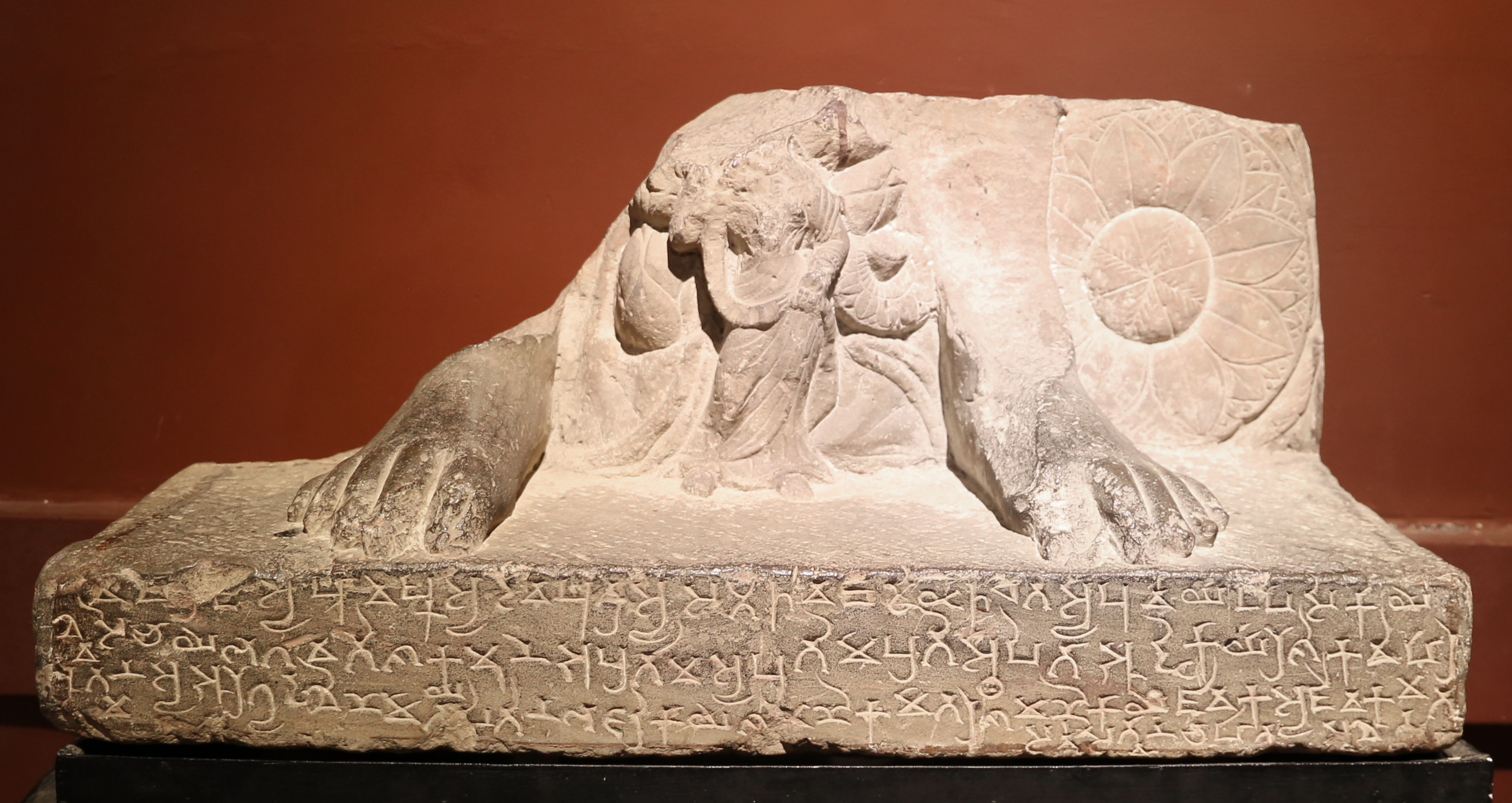
Pedestal of a Buddha statue, with inscription in the name of Huvishka "in the year 45" (𑀲𑀁𑁞𑁔). Starts with Mahārājasya Huviṣkasya Devaputrasya...,... Uttar Pradesh. Chhatrapati Shivaji Maharaj Vastu Sangrahalaya Museum.

=== Graeco-Roman deities ===
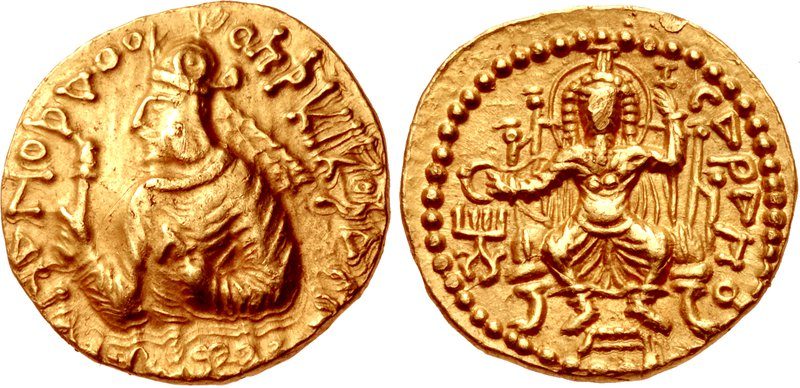
Huvishka with seated Roman-Egyptian god Serapis (ϹΑΡΑΠΟ, "Sarapo") wearing the modius.

Huvishka also incorporates in his coins for the first and only time in Kushan coinage the Hellenistic-Egyptian Serapis (under the name ϹΑΡΑΠΟ, "Sarapo"). Since Serapis was the supreme deity of the pantheon of Alexandria in Egypt, this coin suggests that Huvishka had a strong orientation towards Roman Egypt, which may have been an important market for the products coming from the Kushan Empire.

Another coin possibly depicts the Goddess Roma ("Roma aeterna"), under the name "Rishti" (Greek: ΡΙϷΤ), or "Riom" (Greek: ΡΙΟΜ).

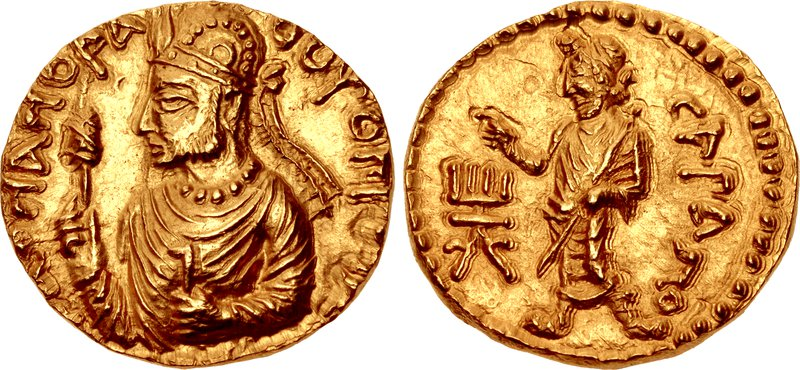
Another coin of Huvishka holding a scepter, with, on the reverse, deity Serapis (ϹΑΡΑΠΟ, "Sarapo")

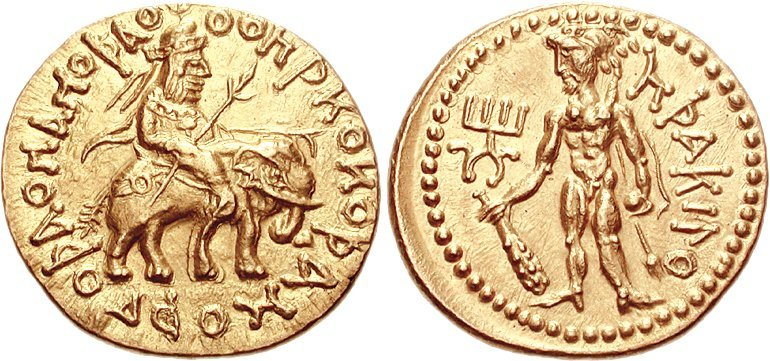
Coin of Huvishka. Obverse: ϷΑΟΝΑΝΟϷΑΟ ΟΟΗϷΚΙ ΚΟϷΑΝΟ (Shaonanoshao Ooishki Koshano, "King of kings, Huvishka the Kushan"). Reverse: Herakles with legend ΗΡΑΚΙΛΟ (Erakilo).

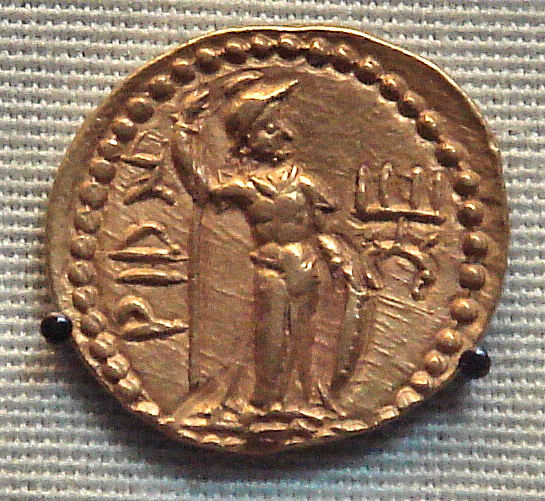
Possible depiction of "Roma Aeterna". The legend has been variously read Riom (Greek: ΡΙΟΜ), or more recently Rishti (Greek: ΡΙϷΤ).

=== Iranian deities ===
Huvishka is also known to have included Iranian deities in his pantheon. Between 164 and 174, he established a temple to Pharro ("Royal splendour")-Ardoxsho in the stronghold of Ayrtam, near Termez, according to the Ayrtam inscription. He also issued numerous coins in the name of these deities. Many more Iranian deities are also known from his coinage, such as Miiro (Mitra), Mao (the Lunar deity Mah), Nana (Anahita), Atsho (Atar, "The Royal fire"). Another Zoroastrian deity, the supreme god Ooromozdo (Ahura Mazda), and Mazdo oana ("Mazda the victorious") also appears. Other Zoroastrian deities include Rishti ("Uprightness", Arshtat), Ashaeixsho ("Best righteousness", Asha Vahishta), the Lunar deity Mah (Mao), Shaoreoro ("Best royal power", Khshathra Vairya).

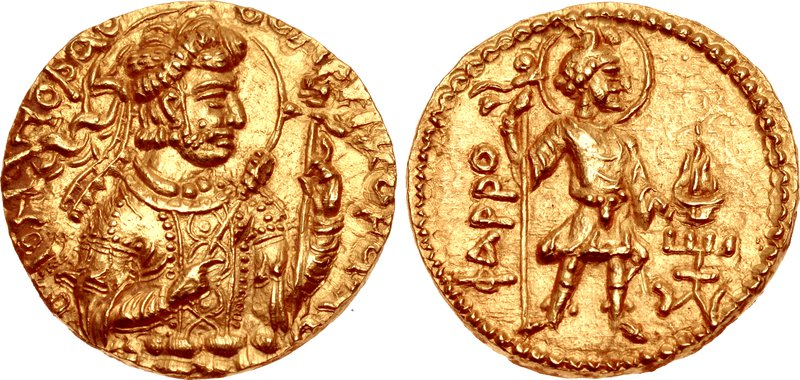
Coin of Kushan ruler Huvishka diademed, with deity Pharro ("ΦΑΡΡΟ"). Circa CE 152-192

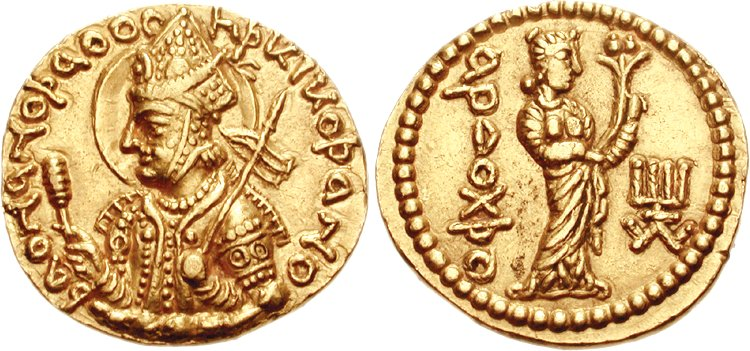
Coin of Kushan ruler Huvishka diademed, with deity Ardoxsho. Circa CE 152-192

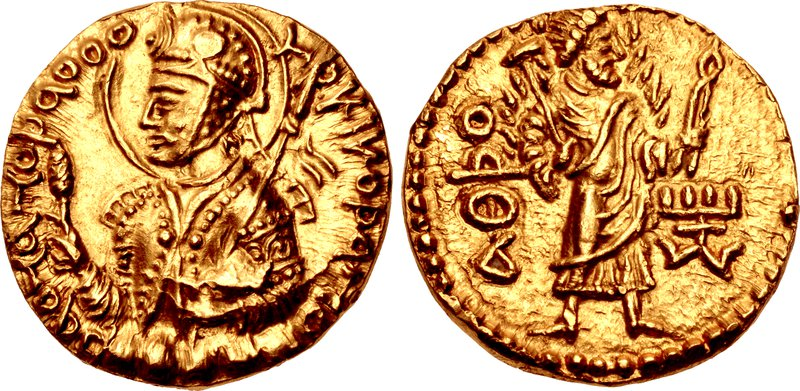
Huvishka with Atosho (ΑΘΟϷΟ "The Royal fire").

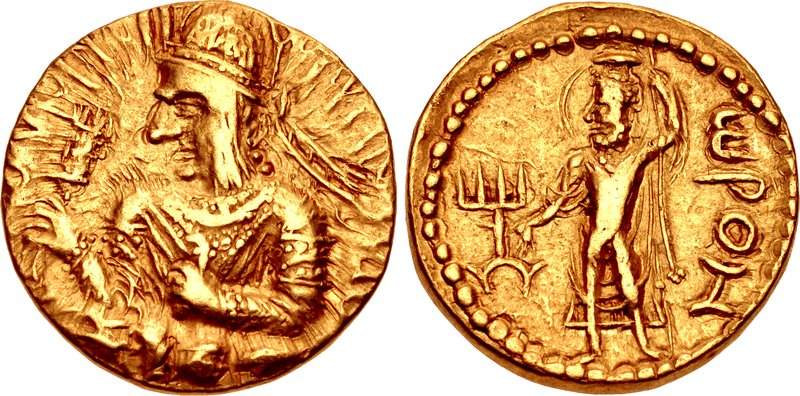
Huvihska with Ahuramazda (ωΡΟΜ, Orom[zdo]).

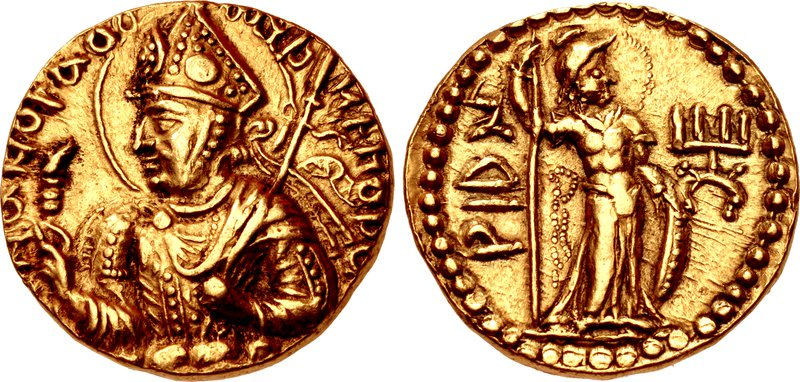
Huvishka with Rishti.

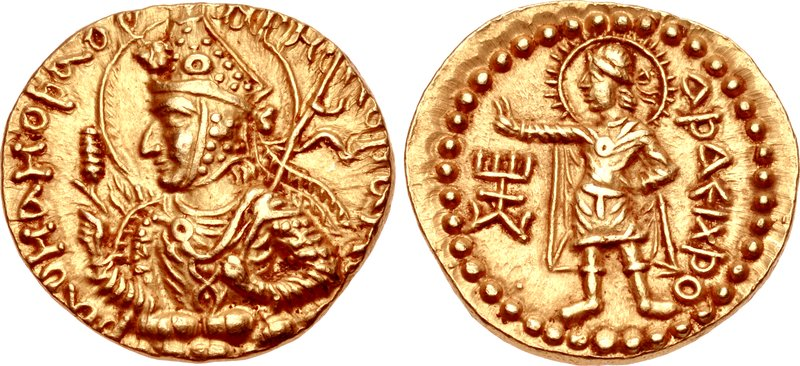
Huvishka with "Asha Vahishta" (ΑϷΑΕΙΧϷΟ, Ashaiexsho).

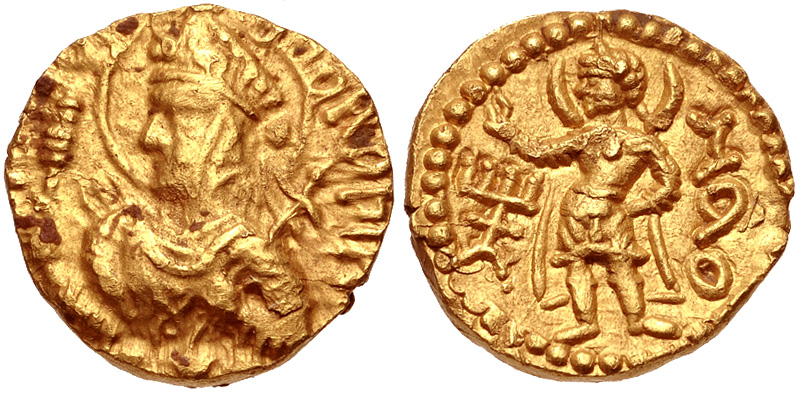
Huvishka with the Lunar deity Mah (Mao). The lunar crescent appears behind the shoulders.

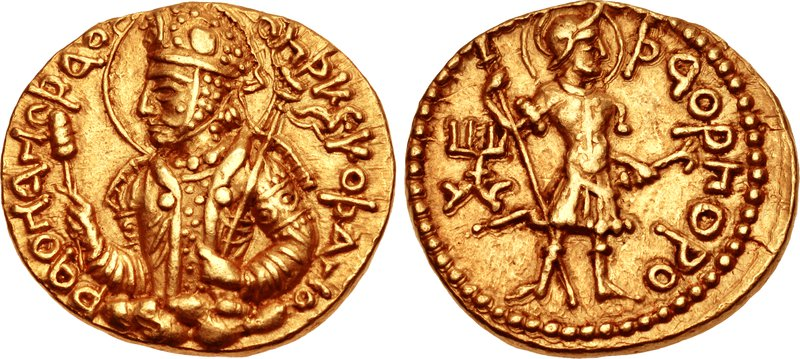
Huvishka with Shaoreoro (ϷΑΟΡΗΟΡΟ, "Best royal power", Khshathra Vairya).

=== Indian deities ===
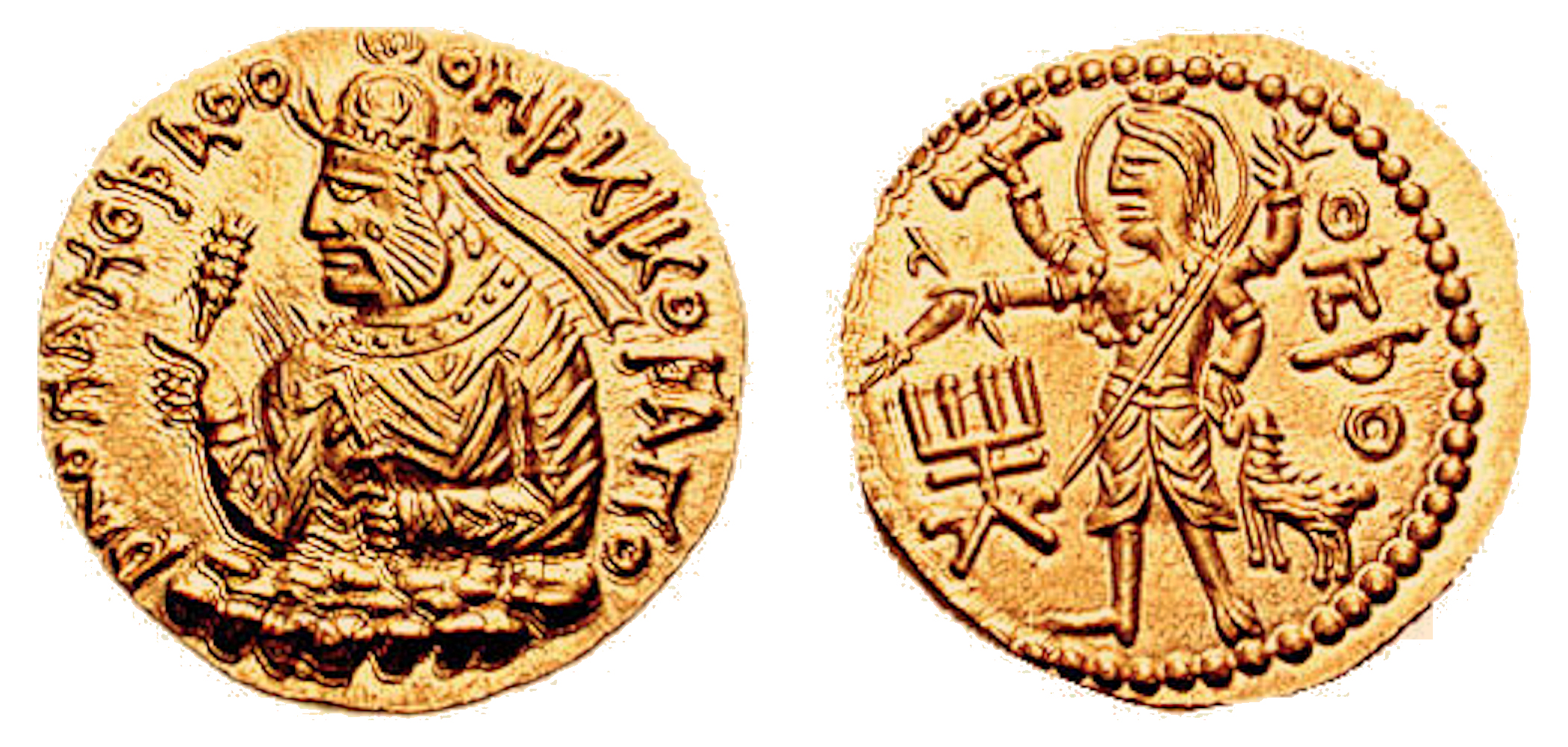
Coin of Huvishka with deity Oesho ("ΟΗϷΟ", Shiva).

Huvishka is known to have restored a temple in Mathura, where provisions were made for hospitality towards the Brahmans. Some of the coins of Huvishka also featured Maaseno on his coins, the Kushan incarnation of the Hindu god Karttikeya, or Skanda, whose epithet was "Mahasena". This god being particularly important to the Yaudheyas, it may have been incorporated into Kushan coinage when the Kushans expanded into Yaudheya territory in order to establish control of the Mathura area. It may also have been adopted as a way to appease the warlike Yaudheyas. In effect, the Kushans became the suzerains of the Yaudheyas in the area.

In a departure from his predecessor Kanishka, Huvishka also added Oesho ("ΟΗϷΟ", Shiva) on some of his coinage. In replacement of the Iranian god of war Ořlagno, he also added several Indian war gods, such as Skando (Old Indian Skanda), Komaro (Old Indian Kumara), Maaseno (Old Indian Mahāsena), Bizago (Old Indian Viśākha), and even Ommo (Old Indian Umā), the consort of Siva. This could suggest an evolution toward Indian deities among the Kushans, possibly motivated by the enlisting of Indian warriors.

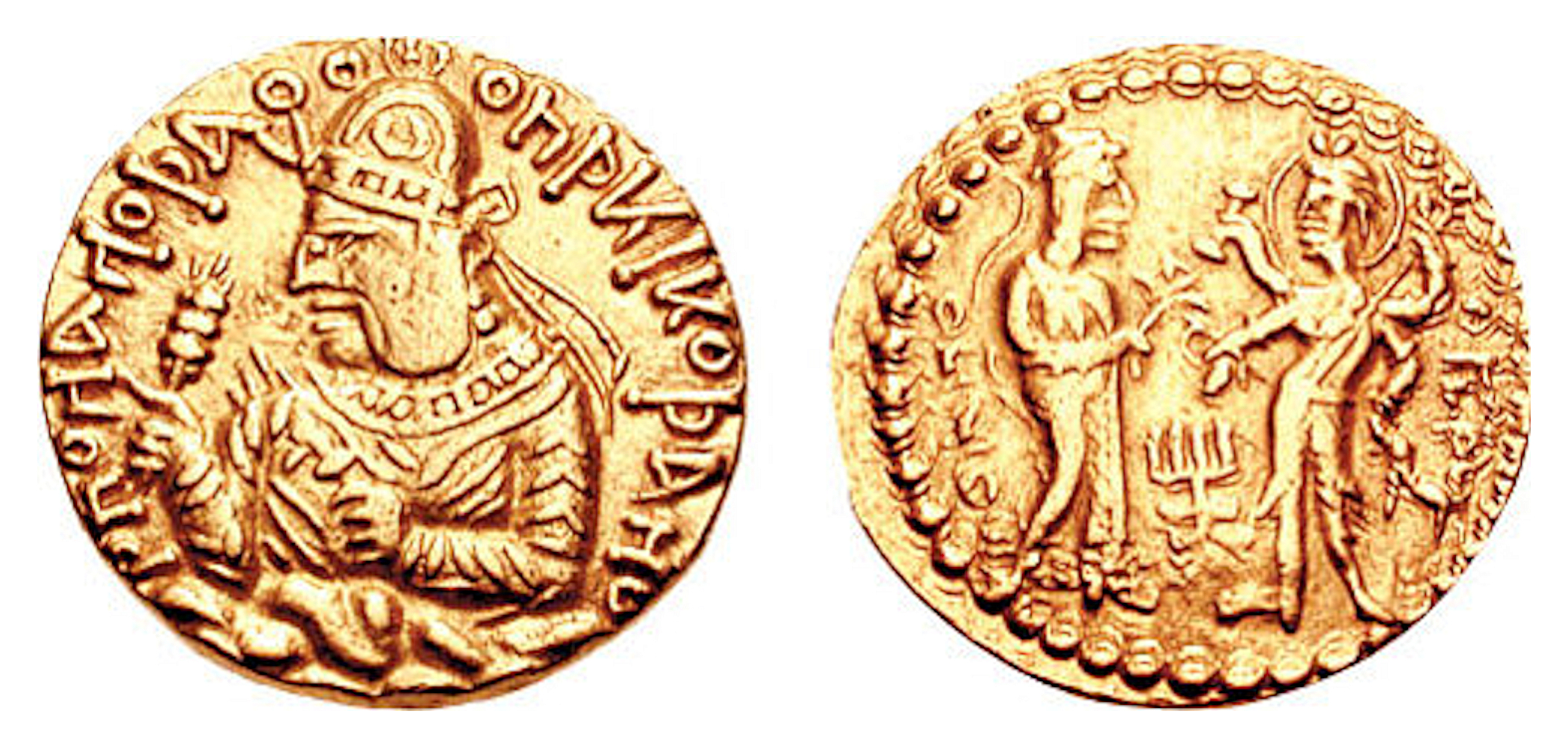
Coin of Huvishka with the divine couple Ommo ("ΟΜΜΟ", Umā) holding a flower, and Oesho ("ΟΗϷΟ", Shiva) with four arms holding attributes. c. 150-180 CE.

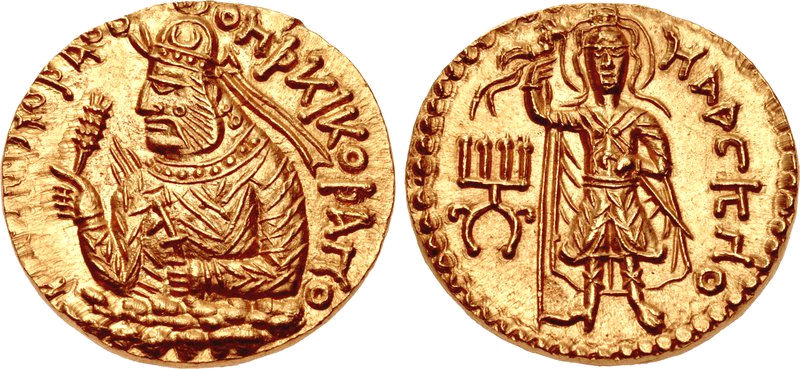
Coin of Huvishka with Indian deity Maaseno (Old Indian Mahāsena).

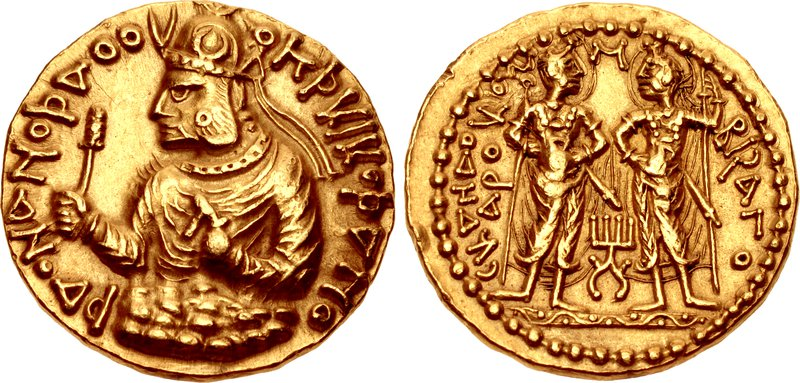
Coin of Huvishka with Indian deities Skando-Komaro (Old Indian Skanda-Kumara) and Bizago (Old Indian Viśākha)

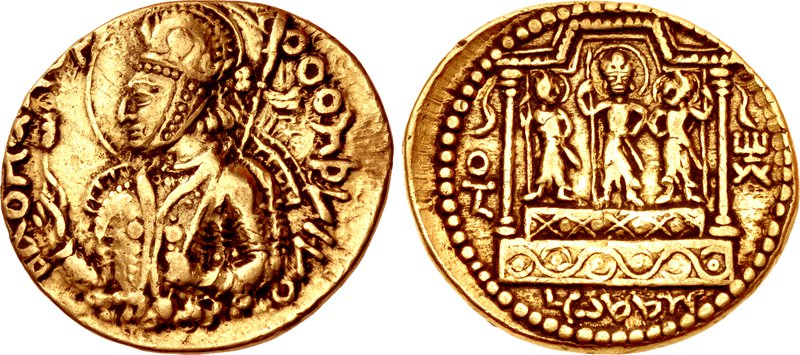
Huvishka with Maaseno (Old Indian Mahāsena) and attendants

== Coinage and statuary ==
The coinage of Huvishka is characterized by a great variety of designs and the large quantity of gold coins that were minted: more gold coins from Huvishka are known than from all other Kushan rulers combined. The locations of his mints were mainly in Balkh and Peshawar, with smaller mints in Kashmir and Mathura.

One of the great remaining puzzles of Huvishka's reign is the devaluation of his coinage. Early in his reign the copper coinage plunged in weight from a standard of 16g to about 10–11g. The quality and weight then continued to decline throughout the reign until at the start of the reign of Vasudeva the standard coin (a tetradrachm) weighed only 9g. The devaluation led to a massive production of imitations, and an economic demand for the older, pre-devaluation coins in the Gangetic valley. However, the motivation and some of the details of this devaluation are still unknown.

Huvishka

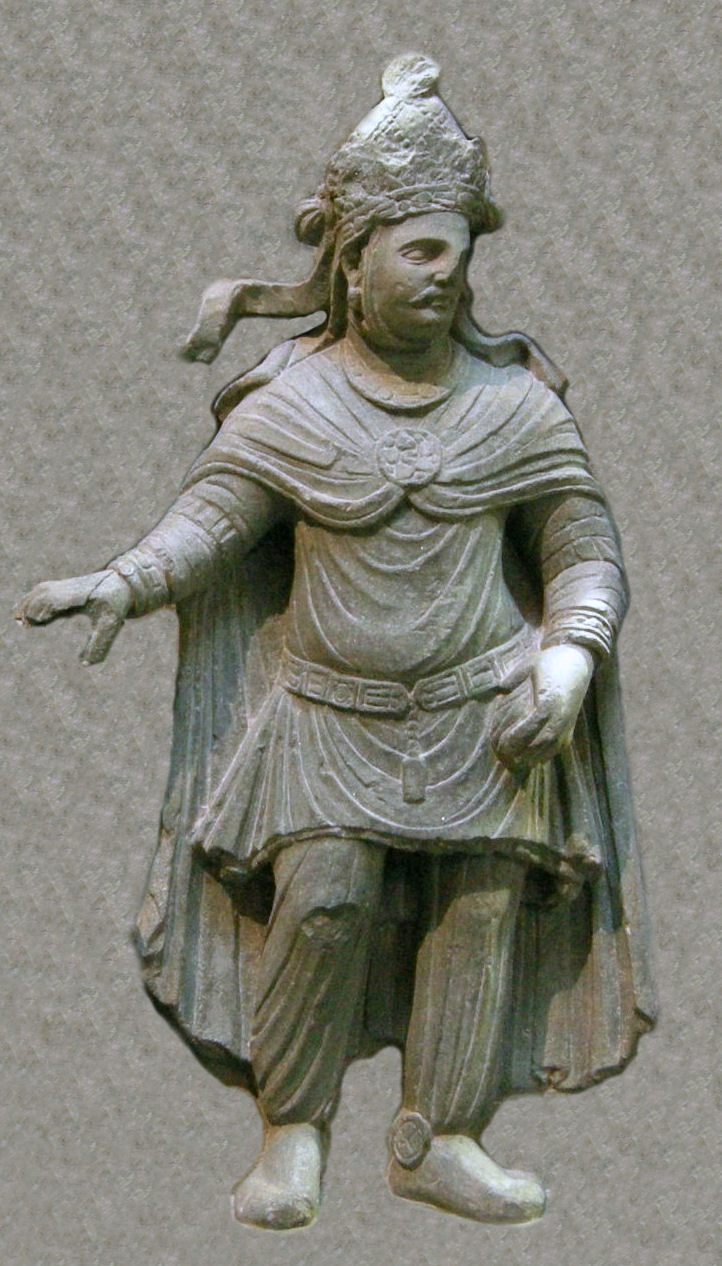
Kushan king or prince, said to be Huvishka, Gandhara art.

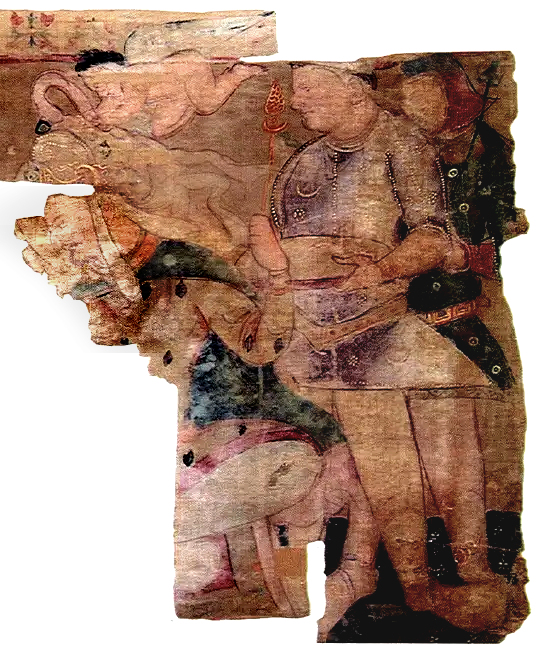
Painting of a Kushan ruler (probably Huvishka, seated) and attendants, Bactria.

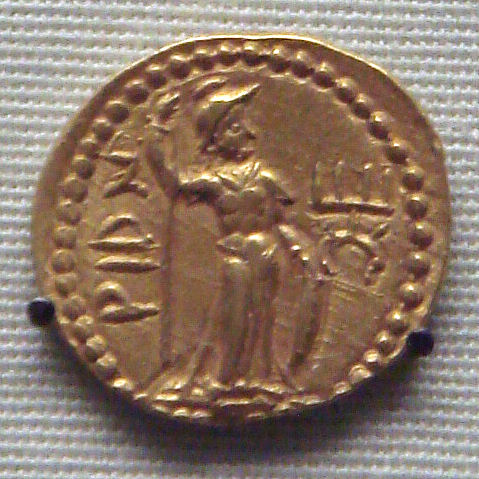
Coin of Huvishka 126–163, with Kushan goddess Rishti, possibly depicted as Roma copied from a Roman coin.

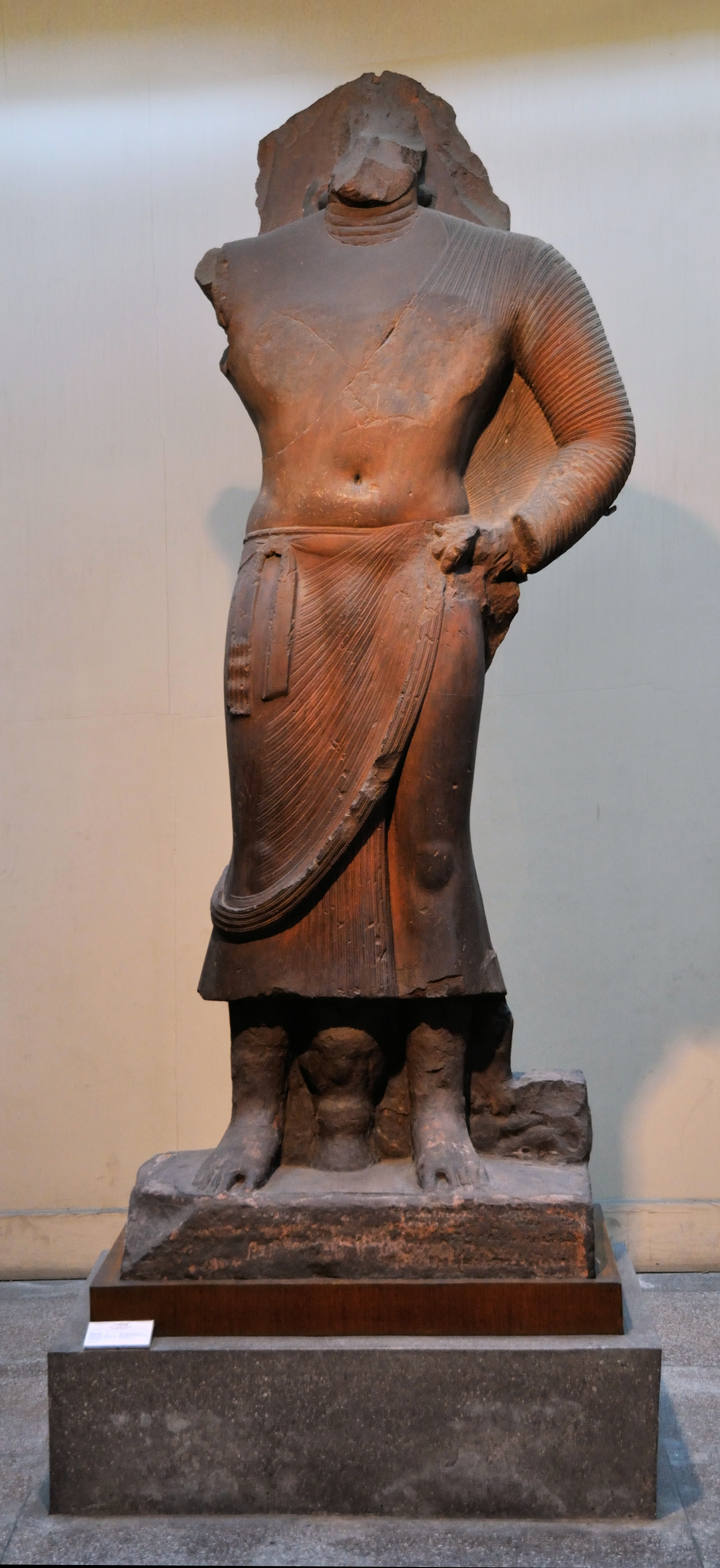
Bodhisatva of Sravasti, inscribed "reign of Huvishka" (or possibly Kanishka).

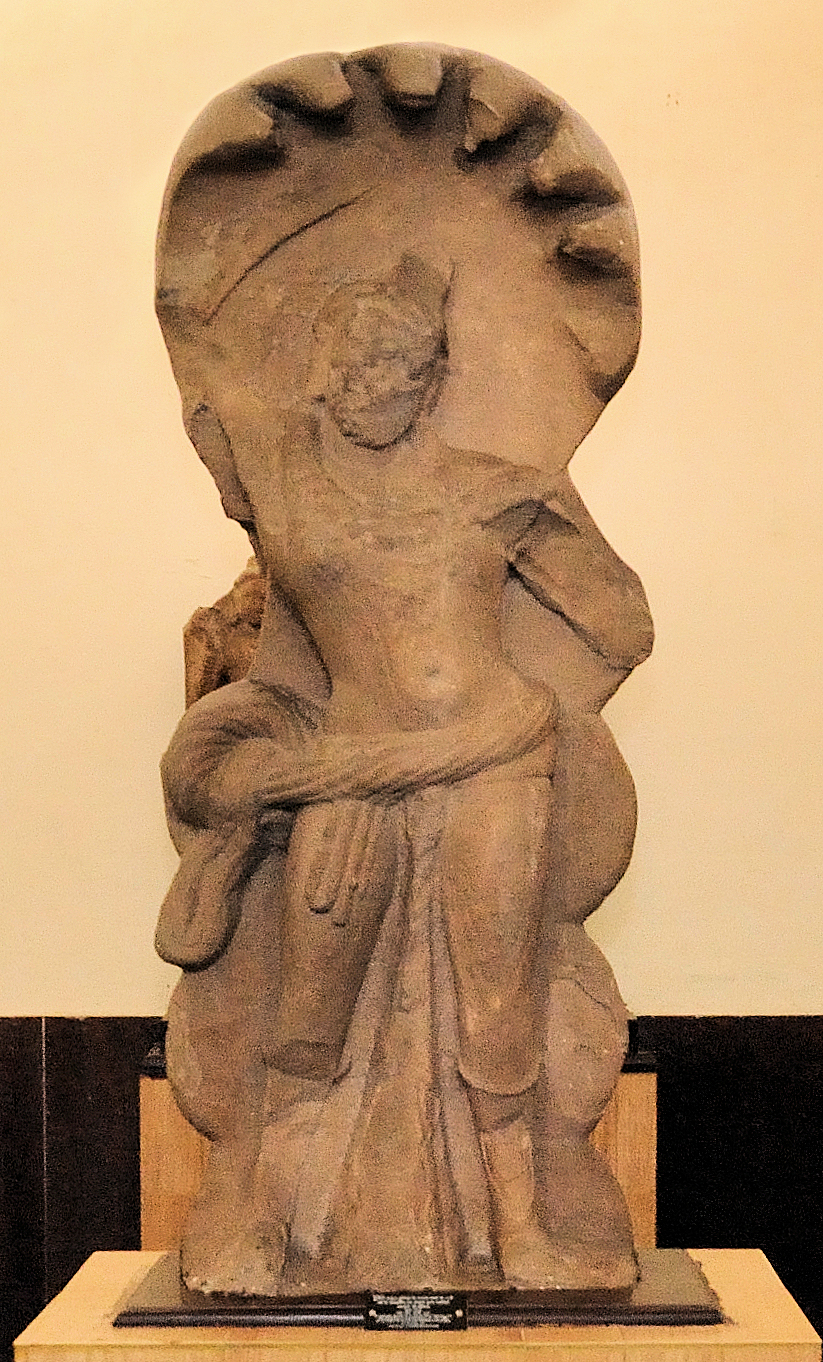
Naga statue with inscription of "the 40th year of the reign of Huvishka". Mathura Museum.

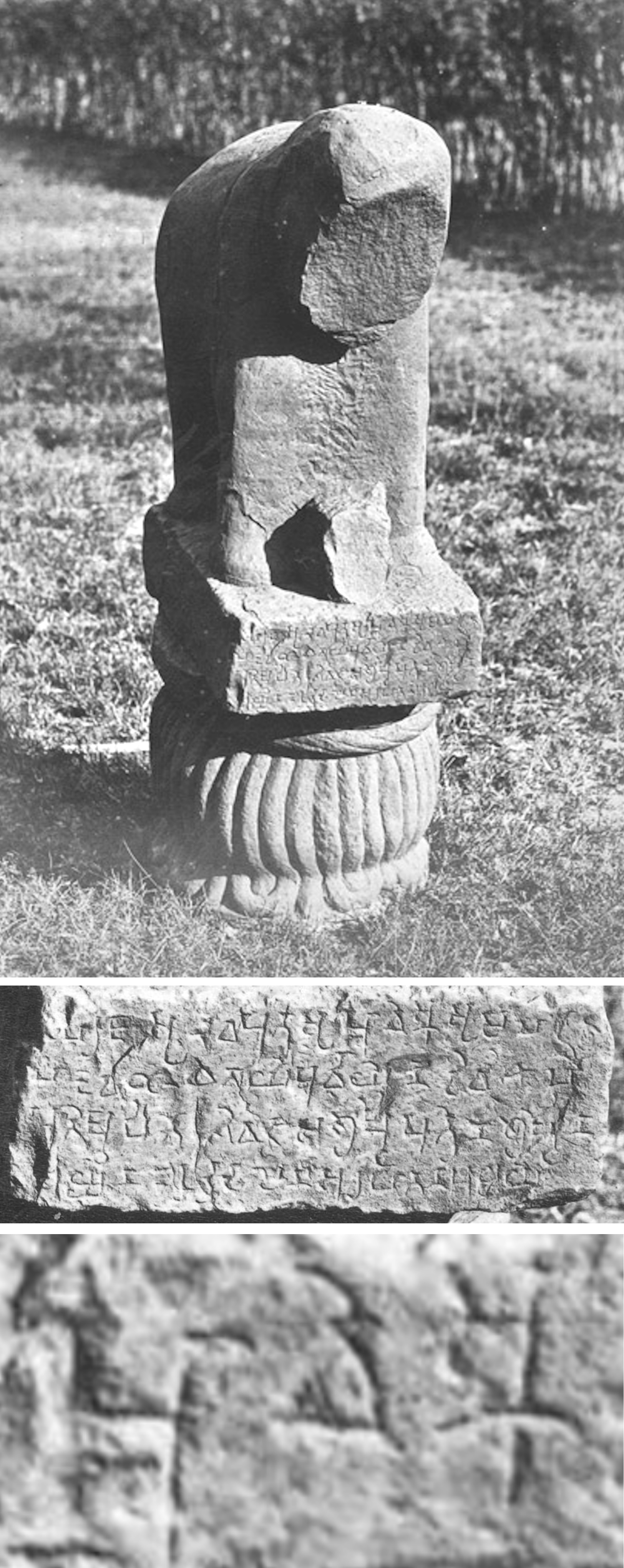
Kankali Tila elephant capital with inscription of "Huvishka in the year 39". Detail of the name Hu-vi-ṣka

== Sources ==
- Bivar, A. D. H. (2004). "HUVIŠKA". Encyclopaedia Iranica, Vol. XII, Fasc. 6. pp. 583–585.

Preceded by Kanishka	Kushan Ruler; 150–183 CE	Succeeded by Vasudeva I

Territories/ dates	Western India	Western Pakistan Balochistan	Paropamisadae Arachosia	Bajaur	Gandhara	Western Punjab	Eastern Punjab	Mathura	Pataliputra
				INDO-SCYTHIAN KINGDOM			INDO-GREEK KINGDOM	INDO-SCYTHIAN Northern Satraps	
25 BCE – 10 CE				Indo-Scythian dynasty of the APRACHARAJAS; Vijayamitra (ruled 12 BCE – 15 CE) (Note: From the dated inscription on the Rukhana reliquary)	Liaka Kusulaka; Patika Kusulaka; Zeionises	Kharahostes (ruled 10 BCE– 10 CE); Mujatria	Strato II and Strato III	Hagana	
10-20CE		INDO-PARTHIAN KINGDOM; Gondophares		Indravasu	INDO-PARTHIAN KINGDOM; Gondophares		Rajuvula		
20–30 CE			Ubouzanes; Pakores	Vispavarma (ruled c. 0–20 CE)	Sarpedones		Bhadayasa	Sodasa	
30-40 CE			KUSHAN EMPIRE; Kujula Kadphises (c. 50–90)	Indravarma	Abdagases		...	...	
40–45 CE				Aspavarma	Gadana		...	...	
45–50 CE				Sasan	Sases		...	...	
50–75 CE							...	...	
75–100 CE	Indo-Scythian dynasty of the WESTERN SATRAPS; Chastana		Vima Takto (c. 90–113)				...	...	
100–120 CE	Abhiraka		Vima Kadphises (c. 113–127)						
120 CE	Bhumaka; Nahapana	PARATARAJAS; Yolamira	Kanishka I (c. 127–151)				Great Satrap Kharapallana and Satrap Vanaspara for Kanishka I		
130–230 CE	Jayadaman; Rudradaman I Damajadasri I Jivadaman; Rudrasimha I Isvaradatta; Rudrasimha I Jivadaman; Rudrasena I	Bagamira; Arjuna; Hvaramira; Mirahvara	Huvishka (c. 151 – c. 190); Vasudeva I (c. 190 – 230)						
230–250 CE	Samghadaman; Damasena; Damajadasri II; Viradaman; Yasodaman I Vijayasena; Damajadasri III; Rudrasena II; Visvasimha	Miratakhma; Kozana; Bhimarjuna; Koziya; Datarvharna; Datarvharna	KUSHANO-SASANIANS; Ardashir I (c. 230 – 250); Ardashir II (?-245)	Kanishka II (c. 230 – 247)					
250–280	Samghadaman; Damasena; Damajadasri II; Viradaman; Yasodaman I Vijayasena; Damajadasri III; Rudrasena II; Visvasimha	Miratakhma; Kozana; Bhimarjuna; Koziya; Datarvharna; Datarvharna	Peroz I, "Kushanshah" (c. 250 – 265); Hormizd I, "Kushanshah" (c. 265 – 295)			Vāsishka (c. 247 – 267); Kanishka III (c. 267 – 270)			
280–300	Bhratadarman	Datayola II	Hormizd II, "Kushanshah" (c. 295 – 300)			Vasudeva II (c. 267 – 300)		GUPTA EMPIRE; Chandragupta I Samudragupta; Chandragupta II	
300–320 CE	Visvasena; Rudrasimha II; Jivadaman		Peroz II, "Kushanshah" (c. 300 – 325)			Mahi (c. 300–305); Shaka (c. 305 – 335)		GUPTA EMPIRE; Chandragupta I Samudragupta; Chandragupta II	
320–388 CE	Yasodaman II; Rudradaman II; Rudrasena III; Simhasena; Rudrasena IV		Varahran I (325–350); Shapur II Sassanid king and "Kushanshah" (c. 350)			Kipunada (c. 335 – 350)		GUPTA EMPIRE; Chandragupta I Samudragupta; Chandragupta II	
388–396 CE	Rudrasimha III		KIDARITES invasion					GUPTA EMPIRE; Chandragupta I Samudragupta; Chandragupta II	
