= Arshtat =

- Goddess of Truth and Justice
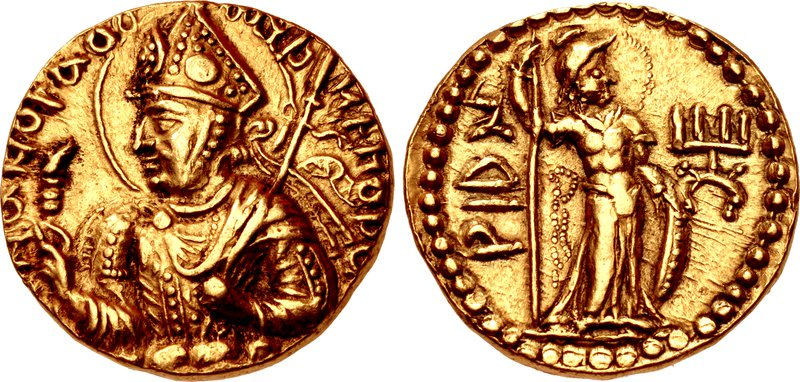
- Kushan ruler Huvishka with Rishti (Arshtat) on the reverse.
- Other names: Ashtad
- Avestan: Arshtat 𐬀𐬭𐬱𐬙𐬁𐬝
- Affiliation: The Thirty-Three Deities, Guardians of the Days of the Month
- Abode: Oshida
- Symbol: Truthfulness
- Sacred Flower: Tulip
- Attributes: Guardian of Wisdom, Labor, and Justice, World-Furthering, Guide of the Spiritual and Worldly Beings
- Associated Deities: Zam, Ameretat, Rashnu
- Day: 26th of each month in the Iranian calendar
- Gender: Female

Arshtat (Avestan: 𐬀𐬭𐬱𐬙𐬁𐬝) is the Avestan language name of a Zoroastrian principle and signifies either "justice" or "honesty." As a substantive, arshtat designates the divinity Arshtat, the hypostasis of "Rectitude" and "Justice". Her standing epithet is "world-furthering" or "world-promoting."

== In scripture ==
Although there is a yasht nominally dedicated to Arshtat (Yasht 18), this hymn does not mention her, and it has been supposed that "the occurrence of arš- 'correct' may have been the reason" for the dedication.

Arshtat is closely allied with "the most upright" Rashnu, the "Judge." The two appear as a dvandva compound "Rashnu-Arshtat" in Yasna 1.7 and 2.7, in Yasht 10.139 and 12.40, and in Sirozeh 1.18 and 2.18. This is an eschatological identification, and in the liturgy recited on the third day after death she is invoked with Rashnu, Sraosha "Obedience" and Mithra "Covenant", together the three guardians of the Chinvat bridge.

In Sirozeh 1.26 and 2.26, Arshtat is invoked as the divinity presiding over the 26th day of the month (cf. Zoroastrian calendar). Both verses associate her with the mythical Mount Ushidarena the "keeper of intelligence" that in Zoroastrian tradition is where Zoroaster spent his years in isolation. Yasna 16.6 states the 26th day of the month is sacred to her.

Arshtat is once (Visperad 7.2) identified with Daena (generally translated as "Religion").

== In tradition ==
Arshtat's eschatological role is carried forward into the 9th–14th century texts of Zoroastrian tradition, where she appears as Middle Persian Ashtad.

Arshtat is an assayer of deeds at the Chinvat bridge, the bridge of judgement that all souls must cross. in Bundahishn (37.10–14), Arshtat plays this role together with the Amesha Spenta Ameretat, of whom Arshtat is a hamkar "co-operator"; and in the Book of Arda Wiraz (5.3), she stands there with Mithra, Rashnu, Vayu-Vata, and Verethragna.

In the apocalyptic Zand-i Wahman yasn (7.19-20), Arshtat—together with Nairyosangha, Mithra, Rashnu, Verethregna, Sraosha and a personified Khwarenah—assists the hero Peshyotan.

== Bibliography ==
- Bartholomae, Christian (1904), Altiranisches Wörterbuch, Strassburg: Trübner (fasc., 1979, Berlin: de Gruyter)
- Dhalla, Maneckji Nusservanji (1938), History of Zoroastrianism, New York: OUP
- Gershevitch, Ilya (1959), The Avestan Hymn to Mithra, Cambridge: University Press
- Gnoli, Gerardo (1987), "Aštād", Encyclopaedia Iranica, vol. 2, New York: Routledge & Kegan Paul: 826
- Lommel, Herman (1927), Die Yašts des Awesta, Göttingen/Leipzig: J. C. Hinrichs
- Skjærvø, Prods Oktor (1987), "Aštād Yašt", Encyclopaedia Iranica, vol. 2, New York: Routledge & Kegan Paul: 826
