= Rashnu =

Zoroastrian god of divine judgement

Rashn
- God of Judgement
- Rashn (left) depicted on a Sogdian plaque holding his scales of judgement
- Other names: Rashnu
- Avestan: 𐬭𐬀𐬴𐬢𐬏
- Associate: Soroush, Mithra, Arshtat
- Symbols: Golden scales
- Day: 18th day of each month
- Texts: Rashn Yasht, Mihr Yasht
- Gender: Male
- Region: Iran, Central Asia

Rashn (Avestan: Rashnu) is a yazata and the god of judgement in Zoroastrianism and ancient Iranian religion. He is said to be the son of Ohrmazd and Armaiti and the brother of Soroush, Mithra, Ahrishwang, and Daena. In Middle Persian writings, Rašnu appears as Rašn, with the standing epithets rāst and ristag, both meaning “true, just,” with rāst also rendered “just” or “righteous.” His Avestan standing epithet is razišta- (MP. razistag), “straightest.” Rashn is invoked five times in the Yasna, but does not figure in its Older Avestan portions. According to the Bundahishn, Rashn is the thirteenth Iranian deity to have been created.

The twelfth Yašt of the Avesta was composed in praise of Rašn. His functions in the Avestan texts can be classified into four main categories: participation in the ritual ordeal (varah), participation in battles alongside Mithra and Soroush, social functions alongside Bərəjiia and Nmāniia, and protection of Ohrmazd's creations. In Middle Persian writings, these earlier roles continue and six principal functions can be identified. Foremost is his presence at the judgment after death as one of the divine judges of souls. He also participates in the ritual ordeal or pasaxt, protects Ohrmazd's creations, and assists Amordad in the creation and nurturing of plants alongside Arshtad and Zamyād. At the end of the world, he aids Pēšōtan, son of Wištāsp, together with Mithra, Soroush, Bahrām, Arshtad, and the Khwarrah. His final function is to encourage human beings to repent of their sins in the material world.

Although Rashn has no direct equivalent in Vedic or Elamite texts, similarities exist between his functions and those of Varuṇa, particularly in connection with the ordeal ritual. Deities with functions resembling those of Rashn also existed in Elamite civilization. Abu Rayhan Biruni mentions his place in the calendars of Iranians, Sogdians, and the people of Khwarazm, while Persian poets refer to Rashn Day or Rash Day in their poetry.

== Etymology ==
The Avestan proper noun Rašnu derives from the verb raz- (Old Indian √raj-, PIE *h₃reĝ-) “to move in a straight line; to direct,” together with the primary suffix -nu-. The PIE root h₃reĝ- carries the meaning “to direct, make straight.” The word occurs both as an adjective meaning “just, rectus” and as a proper name. Its etymologically related superlative razišta- (“straightest, most just”) is Rashn's standing epithet. C. Bartholomae translated the name as “Justice,” while I. Gershevitch argued in favor of “Judge.” Both definitions fit the deity's judicial role. Boyce likewise described Rashn, the “Judge,” as apparently the hypostasis of the idea embodied in the common noun Rašnu, “judging, one who judges.” In contrast, E. Pirart proposed the translation “Orientation” (l’Orientation), suggesting that Rashn originally represented the “straight” pronunciation of ritual texts.

Rashn's name is linked with Mithra's in the Sogdian proper name Rašnumitr (ršnwmtr). He is also honoured in Old Persian nomenclature at the turn of the sixth and fifth centuries BCE, a period when Zoroastrian influences are not clearly apparent in the giving of names in Pars.

== Origin and history ==
While there is no reflex of his name in Old Indian, it appears outside the Avesta in theophoric names occurring in the Persepolis Fortification tablets, namely, *Rashnka, *Rashndāta, and a dubious *Rashnbar(a). Irrespective of the question of whether Darius I was a Zoroastrian, the onomastics of the tablets can hardly have been influenced by Zoroastrianism, and, therefore, Rashn must be regarded as a ‘pagan’ old Iranian deity. It is probable, therefore, that Rashn was a deity of the pagan period, who evolved in association with Mithra's cult. With Arshtad he represents the Ohrmazd's judicial aspect.

Christensen believed that in the societies of eastern Iran, Mithra was worshipped as the principal deity, surrounded by gods such as Rashn, Soroush, Bahram, and several others. He held that the ancient Yašts now preserved in the Younger Avesta were older than the Gathic texts but were modified after the composition of the Gathas to bring them into accordance with the principles of Zoroastrianism. Nyberg, accepting Christensen's view, placed Rashn alongside Mithra, Soroush, Vāyu, Bahrām, Khwarrah and Chista in the group of deities belonging to Mithra's divine assembly. He regarded Rashn as the god of oaths or the fire ordeal. According to Nyberg, the word uruu aθā, appearing in stanza 3 of the Rashn Yašt, refers to an association formed through an oath and derives from the root var, meaning “to choose” or “to select.” He interpreted the word as meaning a companion or assistant in oath-taking.

However, scholars such as Zaehner, considering stanzas 3–5 of the Rashn Yašt, concluded that Rashn was originally an epithet of Ohrmazd and was sometimes also used as an epithet of Mithra. On the basis of the Gathic view that Ohrmazd is the judge at the final resurrection and the Chinvad Bridge, Zaehner regarded Rashn as an epithet of Ohrmazd and Mithra in the ancient Ahuric religion, which subsequently appeared as an independent deity in the Younger Avesta. Nevertheless, Pourdavoud maintained that although Rashn is one of the great deities, relatively little information about him survives, making it difficult to judge his precise nature.

The Yašt dedicated to Rashn is a late redactional collection, in which the author has attempted to appropriate material belonging to the divine Judge for Ohrmazd (stanzas 3–4), yet has retained the original verses proper to Rashn (stanzas 5–6) and then added additional text.

== Oaths, judicial ordeals, and the Rashn Yašt ==
The Rashn Yašt opens with a formulaic query common in late Avestan texts, in which Zoroaster asks Ohrmazd concerning the rašnyā uxδahe, probably meaning “in respect to the rule of speech” (understanding rašni-ā as a locative with the postposition of rāzan-/rāšn-). Specifically, he asks of the Holy Word (mąθrahe spəntahe) three matters belonging to the sphere of jurisprudence: “the correct law … the law of judicial procedure … the decision” (arš.dātəm … frāždātəm … wiciθəm).

The broad theme of the Rashn Yašt (Yt. 12) consists of repeated appeals to Rashn to be present at the varah-. This legal term can mean “an oath” or “an ordeal” and is generally understood as a ritualized trial undertaken by a defendant to establish the truthfulness of their claim. In such a procedure, the defendant would swear to the veracity of his testimony, after which a means of testing its truthfulness would be imposed. Bartholomae compares the Middle Persian "war", meaning “oath, ordeal,” an interpretation also discussed by Darmesteter and Lommel. Pirart, however, rejects this understanding and instead translates varah- as “[sacrificial] space”. Like the Vedic judge Varuṇa, Rashn was invoked at trials where oaths were ritually solemnized.

In stanza 3 of the Rashn Yašt, Ohrmazd explains to Zoroaster how the varah should be performed. The Dēnkard mentions thirty-three kinds of varah ordeals or divine judgments, although the procedures for most of them are no longer known. Stanzas 3–7 of the Rashn Yašt refer to several types, including the fire ordeal (Avestan ātar-), the barsom ordeal (Avestan barəsman-), the ordeal of the overflowing [hand or vessel] (Avestan vīγžāraiieiṇt- pərənā-), the oil ordeal (Avestan raoγniiā-), and the ordeal involving plant sap (Avestan āzuitī- uruuarā-). The ritual instructions also direct the officiant to “strew forth one-third of the barəsman- along the path of the sun” (θrišūm barəsma frastərənuiiā̊ paitiš́a hū aδβanəm).

In verses 5–6, Rashn is invoked to come to the varah in his role as judge. The invocation reads: “We invoke, we propitiate lofty Rashn, the powerful. I invoke even the urwaθā, to come to this instituted warah, to the fire and the barəsman, to the overflowing cup, to the ordeal-ghee, and to the vegetable oil. Then he will come to thy aid, to this instituted warah ….” The corresponding invocatory formula, “We call, we propitiate Rashn who is strong … to this prepared varah-,” is expressed in Avestan as zbaiiamahi frīnāmahi rašnūm yim amauuaṇtəm … auui imat̰ varō uzdātəm. In this context, fire functions as the embodiment of Asha (truth), while water is the element over which oaths were sworn, as illustrated by the Atharva Veda 4.16: “and (Varuṇa) is hidden in the meager water.” The oils most likely belonged to the actual ordeal.

The twelfth Yašt states that mighty and exalted Rašn, together with the Victorious Wind (Avestan: vāta- vərəθrājana-), Dāmōiš Upamana, the Kayanian Glory (Avestan: kauuaēm xvarənah-), and the Mazda-created Benefit (Avestan saoka- mazdaδāita-), comes to the aid of whoever invokes them during the varah. Pourdavoud interprets these appeals as a means by which people undergoing difficult trials and dangerous judicial proceedings might seek deliverance through recitation of the sacred word and an appeal to the deity of justice and fairness for victory and salvation.

Verses 7–8 contain a series of vocative epithets expressing Rashn's nature: truth-possessing (aṣ̌āum), most just (razišta), most beneficent (spə ništa), wisest (waēδišta), who knows best from afar (parakwistəma), who sees farthest in the distance (dūraēdarəštəma), who best supports the trial (arəθəm bairišta), who best strikes down the thief (tāyūm jaγništa), and who best destroys both the thief and the bandit at this trial (nasišta tāyūmca hazaŋhanəmca ahmi arəθe). The section closes with the praising of Rashn through thirteen vocative forms. These epithets are appropriate to his role as divine Judge, particularly his ability to perceive the secret activities of people from afar. In keeping with the theme of his ubiquity, the closing stanzas enumerate, through repeated formulae, the places throughout the world where Rashn is present.

Rashn's judicial function also appears in the Vendīdād 4.54–55, where he presides over an oath-swearing ritual involving “water which is sulphurous, golden, bestowing proof” (āpəm saokəṇtauuaitīm zaraniiāuuaitīm vīθušauuaitīm). Schwartz, however, translates āpəm saokəṇtauuaitīm as “oath water.” The passage prescribes harsh penalties for perjury, described as “warding off Rashn and cheating Mithra” (rašnaošca paiti.saŋhəm Mithraheca aiβi.druxtəm). The precise context involving this oath-water remains obscure. In the Mihr Yašt (Yt. 10.41), Rashn, Mithra, and Soroush pursue and harry covenant-breakers.

Rašn's role in Middle Persian texts apparently continues his earlier function as the judge of the varah in Avestan tradition. According to Goldman, this function is mentioned in the Wizīdagīhā ī Zādspram and the Dēnkard.

== Judgment of the dead and the Chinvad Bridge ==
According to Zoroastrian tradition, the judgment of souls is carried out by a tribunal of three yazatas: Mithra, lord of the covenant and unswerving in his equity, presides over it, with Soroush and Rashn as his fellow judges. The presence of a lesser divinity alongside greater ones is not unusual in Zoroastrianism, as the former may be considered more immediately present or directly concerned with the activity described. As the hypostasis of judging, Rashn was especially fitted for this function and traditionally holds the scales in which good and evil are weighed, a concept interpreted as being alluded to by Zoroaster in Yasna 48.8. In these scales, actions weigh most heavily, followed by words and then thoughts, although all three contribute to the total of a person's good or evil achieved on earth. This ethic is strongly emphasized in the Gathas and, like the doctrine of the seven Aməša Spəntas, appears to have arisen directly from Zoroaster's meditations as a priest. In Zoroaster's teaching, the good actions that “go to the Bridge” and weigh down Rashn's scales include the performance of religious services, offerings, and sacrifices. Their merit is stored alongside other good deeds, words, and intentions in Mazdā's “house”, and the soul that has accumulated sufficient merit during life, having crossed the Bridge, ascends with its Daena to the “Best Existence,” the “fair abode of Good Intention and Righteousness.”

In the Pahlavi books, Mithra's prominence has greatly diminished, while Rashn's earlier judicial role is primarily confined, together with Mihr and Soroush, to the judgment of the dead. At dawn following the third night after death, the soul proceeds to judgment, where the merits and faults accumulated during life and stored in the House of Song are weighed before Mithra, Soroush, and Rashn. According to the Mēnōg ī xrad, on the fourth day after death, Soroush, acting as psychopomp, leads the soul on a perilous journey to the Chinvad Bridge, where Mihr and Rashn await. Rashn holds the scales (tarāzūg) and impartially weighs the soul's deeds. The Ardā Wīrāz Nāmag describes these as “yellow, golden scales” (tarāzūg ī zard ī zarrēn), while the Mēnōg ī xrad emphasises their absolute impartiality: the balance does not favour the righteous or the sinful, rulers or other authorities, and does not deviate even by a hair's breadth. No favour is shown to the rich or the poor, the weak or the strong, and each individual is judged entirely according to their own life. If good thoughts, words, and deeds outweigh evil ones, the soul passes to heaven; if evil outweighs good, it is sent to hell. When the two are exactly equal, the soul proceeds instead to the intermediate realm of Hamestagan.

The Bundahishn further connects Rašn's scales with the structure of the Chinvad Bridge, which is described as resembling the deity's two arms, one extending to the foot of Mount Alborz in the north and the other to its summit in the south. Following the first three nights after death, the soul is brought to the foot of the mountain to cross the Bridge and reach its summit. The arms of Rashn's scales of justice, called the yoke in Pahlavi, form a mountain range extending from the northern to the southern end of the earth, where they join Mount Alborz, which surrounds the world. The central pointer of these scales is Čagād ī Dāitī, situated precisely at the midpoint of the range. Although Rashnis not mentioned in the Bundahishn account of the raising of the dead and the final body (ristāxēz ud tan ī pasēn), the Pahlavi gloss on Yasna 46.5c interprets the verse eschatologically: “By Rashnis to be quickened the one who is righteous and the one who is wicked [namely, each one is to be held in justice].” In addition to judging the dead, the Bundahishn assigns Rashnthe duty of overseeing judgment in the material world, continuing his earlier Avestan function as judge of the varah. He is described as sleepless and as the spirit of righteousness, who establishes what is free from deception and prevents the demons from destroying the material creation. He also reckons human souls according to their sins and good deeds, and refuses to remain where a judge delivers a false judgment. When Rashn reckons a soul, Arshtad and Zamyād place it upon the scales. This cooperation in judgment and the protection of plants has been interpreted as reflecting the blending of newer eschatological beliefs with pre-Zoroastrian mythological ideas that associated human regeneration and resurrection with the life of plants.

Rashn (middle) holding a scale - Sogidian depiction of a soul being judged before the tribunal

== Warfare, Mithra’s chariot, and struggle against evil ==
Rashn's close association with Mithra, the deity responsible for the inviolability of covenants and treaties, parallels that of Varuṇa with Mitra in the Veda. The two deities are paired in the expressions hacimnō miθrō.rashnca and haθra miθrāca rashnca, reminiscent of the Vedic dvandva compound mitrā́-váruṇā. Their association is also reflected in the Middle Parthian proper name ršnwmtr, in which their names appear in inverse order. The Mihr Yašt portrays Mithra driving his chariot with Rashn on his right or on his left. This association also extends to warfare, in which Rashn is present and praised alongside other divinities. In the Mihr Yašt, Rashn appears with Mithra and Soroush disrupting the ranks of warriors, while stanza 126 depicts him on Mithra's right, with Chista on his left, as they go to battle against demons, covenant-breakers, and Ahriman. The Farvardīn Yašt describes Rashn, together with the powerful Faravahars of the righteous, Mithra, Dāmōiš Upamana, and the Vayu-Vata, entering the midst of opposing armies and assisting those who venerate the Fravahars with faith, alert thought, and a believing conscience. The Bahrām Yašt likewise refers to Rashn, Mithra, and Bahrām accompanying warriors in battle. Certain epithets used in his praise, including “best restrainer” (Avestan upa.raoδišta), “best at striking from afar” (Avestan parakauuistəma), and “mighty and exalted” (Avestan barəz- amauuaṇt-), have also been interpreted as indicating his warrior aspect.

Rashn's participation in the struggle against evil continues in Middle Persian accounts of the end of the world. According to the Zand ī Wahman Yasn, Pešōtan, son of Wištāsp, accompanied by 150 righteous men, will restore order and the faith with the assistance of several yazads, including Neryōsang, Soroush, Mihr, Rashn, Bahrām, Arshtad, and Khwarrah. The account further describes Rashn the Just alongside Mithra of the Wide Pastures, courageous Soroush, powerful Bahrām, victorious Arshtad, and the Khwarrah as assisting Pešōtan in the final struggle. The Mēnōg ī xrad also refers to the Spirit of Justice, who never speaks falsely to anyone and who, at the end of the world, joins Soroush, Mithra, Boundless Time, Fortune, and the Dispenser of Fortune in destroying all the creations of Ahriman and finally the demon Āz. In the Rivāyat ī Ēmēd ī Ašawahištān, the Spirit of Justice is likewise mentioned as protecting the souls of the dead. Zarshenas and Rashno suggest that this Spirit of Justice may be identified with Rashn, whose broader role includes protecting Ohrmazd's creations and fighting against Ahriman and the demons.

== Social functions and protection of the created world ==
In addition to his judicial function and participation in battle, another social function may be attributed to this deity. According to this interpretation, Rashn performs a role similar to that of Bərəjiia, the deity responsible for seeds and grain, and Nmāniia, the deity responsible for the household. This conclusion is based on the fact that in the Yasna, Rashn, with the epithet “most just,” is praised alongside Ahrishwangŋ Aṣ̌avan, Bərəjiia, and Nmāniia, together with Soroush and Arshtad. Therefore, Rashn may also be regarded as having social functions connected with the family, alongside these two deities.

According to the Bundahishn, Rashni s among the deities who participate in the creation and nurturing of plants, assisting Amordad together with Arshtad and Zamyād. Accordingly, Ohrmazd created the three deities Rashn, Arshtad, and Zamyād to aid and cooperate with Amordad. Amordad, the Amehraspand responsible for plants, brought their spiritual essence into material form, while Rashn, Arshtad, and Zamyād assisted in carrying out this duty. Therefore, Rashn's cooperation with Mithra, in whose company waters and plants advance, is not coincidental, since Rashnis also a deity present in the celestial sphere of the stars that bear the seeds of plants (the plant-origin stars).

== Worship, liturgy, calendar, and observances ==
Rashn is frequently invoked in Zoroastrian liturgy alongside the female deity of Justice, Arshtad. His close association with Mithra and Soroush is reflected in both the order of their respective Yašts (10, 11, and 12) and the Zoroastrian calendar, in which days 16, 17, and 18 of each month bear their names. On Rashn Day, dedicated to the god of judgment, the Counsels of Adherbadh declares that “life is gay: do in holiness anything you will.” Rashn Day is also one of five days each month on which the performance of the myazd ceremony is obligatory for priests and members of the Good Religion, the others being Mihr Day, Bahrām Day, Arshtad Day, and Anērān Day. The ceremony consists of bringing fruit before the zōt (officiating priest) and performing the Āfrīnagān with the dedication appropriate to that day. The person commissioning the myazd presents the fruit, placing the first fruit in the priest's right hand, after which the zōt performs the Āfrīnagān. Rashn also figures in the ceremonies performed for the dead. During the fateful third night after death, three āfrīnagāns are solemnised, dedicated first to Rashn and Arshtad together, as yazatas of the justice soon to be meted out to the soul, and then to Rāman, divinity of the mysterious air through which the soul must travel.

== See also ==
- Abatur, Mandaean uthra who weighs the souls of the dead to determine their fate
- Frashokereti
