= Vank Cathedral =

Cathedral in Isfahan, Iran

Holy Savior Cathedral Սուրբ Ամենափրկիչ Վանք
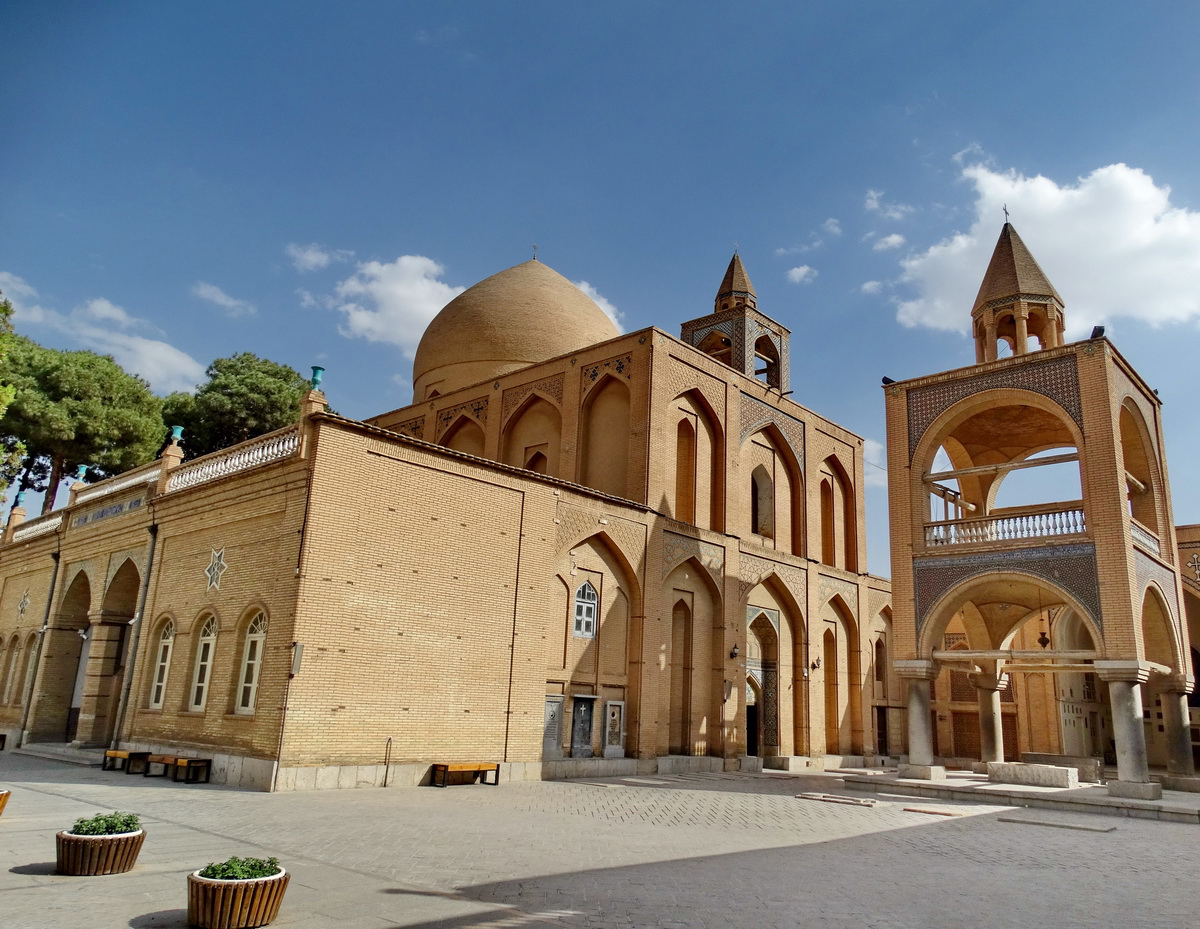
- Exterior view of the Holy Savior Cathedral.

- Location within Iran

Religion
- Affiliation: Armenian Apostolic Church

Location
- Location: New Julfa, Isfahan, Iran
- Coordinates: 32.634911°N 51.655833°E

Architecture
- Groundbreaking: 1655 (original church in 1606)
- Completed: 1664
- Iran National Heritage List
- Official name: Holy Savior Cathedral
- Type: Monastery
- Designated: 1932
- Reference no.: 85
- Conservation organization: Cultural Heritage, Handicrafts and Tourism Organization of Iran

The Holy Savior Cathedral (Armenian: Սուրբ Ամենափրկիչ Վանք, Surb Amenaprkich Vank; Persian: کلیسای وانک, Kelisâye Âmenâperkich), also known the Church of the Saintly Sisters, is an Armenian Apostolic cathedral located in the New Julfa district of Isfahan, Iran. It is commonly referred to as the Vank (Վանք; وانک), which means "monastery" or "convent" in the Armenian language.

== History ==
The cathedral was established in 1606, built by the hundreds of thousands of Armenians who were forcibly resettled by Abbas the Great in his new capital as part of his scorched-earth policy in Armenia during the Ottoman–Safavid War (1603–1618).

The varying fortunes and independence of this suburb across the Zayande River and its eclectic mix of European missionaries, mercenaries, and travelers can be traced almost chronologically in the cathedral's combination styles and contrasts in its external and internal architectural treatment.

== Construction ==
The construction is believed to have begun in 1606 by the first arrivals, and completed with major alterations to the design between 1655 and 1664 under the supervision of Archbishop David. The cathedral consists of a domed sanctuary, much like an Iranian mosque, but with the significant addition of a semi-octagonal apse and raised chancel usually seen in Western-style churches. The cathedral's exteriors are in relatively modern brickwork and are exceptionally plain compared to its elaborately decorated interior.

== Frescos ==
The interior is covered with fine frescos and gilded carvings and includes a wainscot of rich tile work. The delicately blue and gold painted central dome depicts the Biblical story of the creation of the world and man's expulsion from Eden. Pendentives throughout the church are painted with a motif of a cherub's head surrounded by folded wings, typical of Armenian art. The ceiling above the entrance is painted with delicate floral motifs in the style of Persian miniature. Two sections, or bands, of murals run around the interior walls: the top section depicts events from the life of Jesus, while the bottom section depicts tortures inflicted upon Armenian martyrs by the Ottoman Turks.

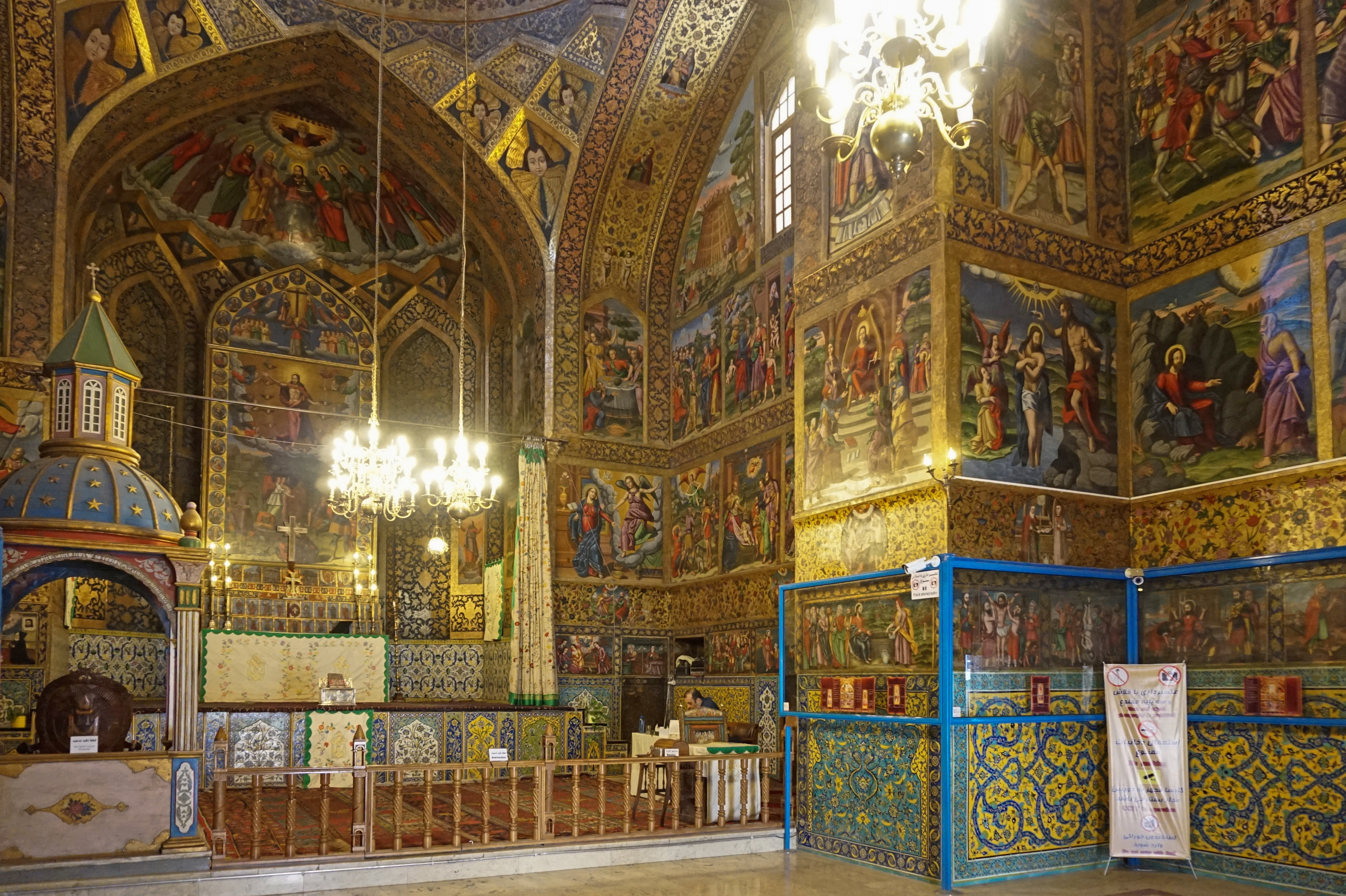
Interior of the Cathedral

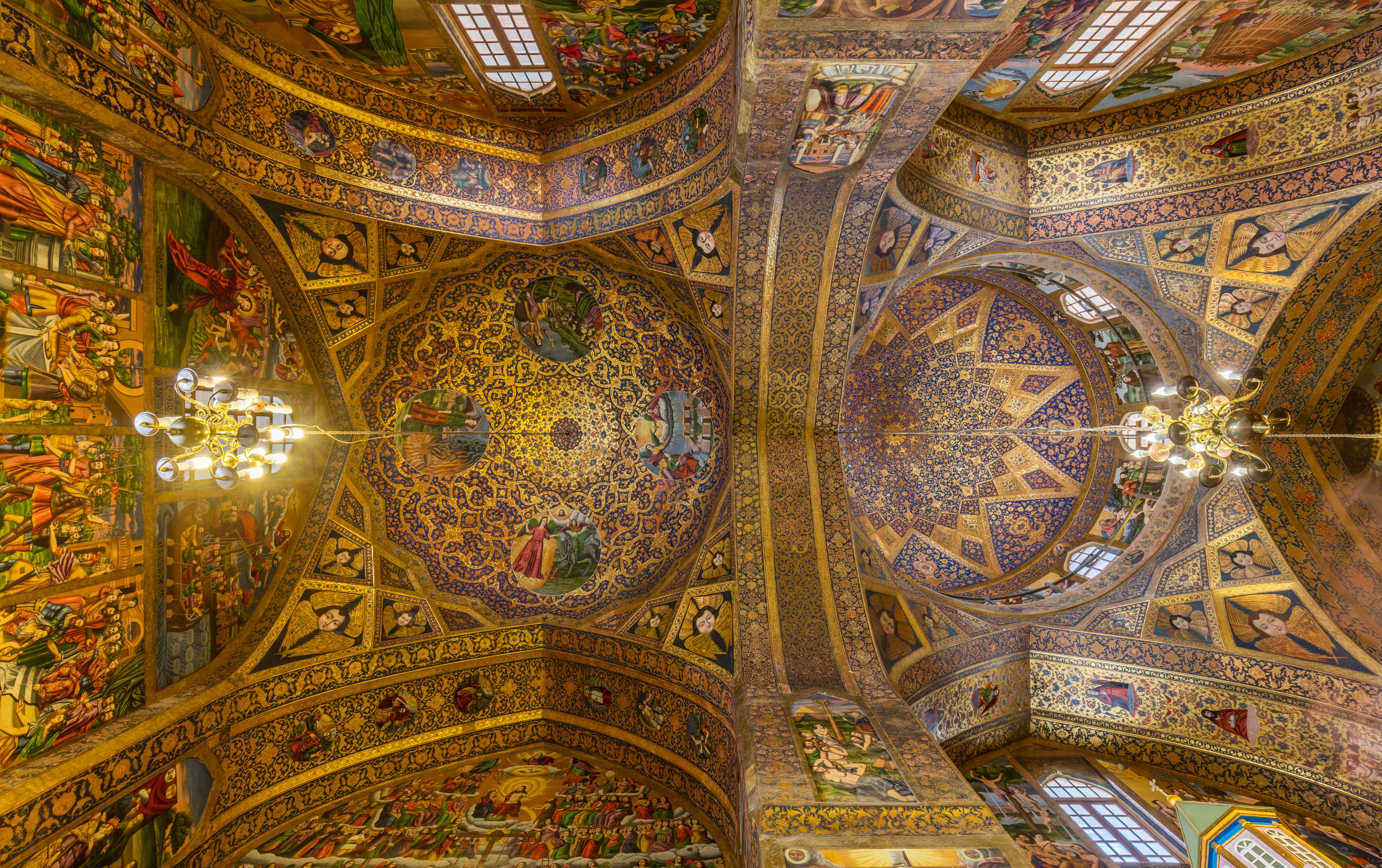
Ceiling of the Holy Savior Cathedral

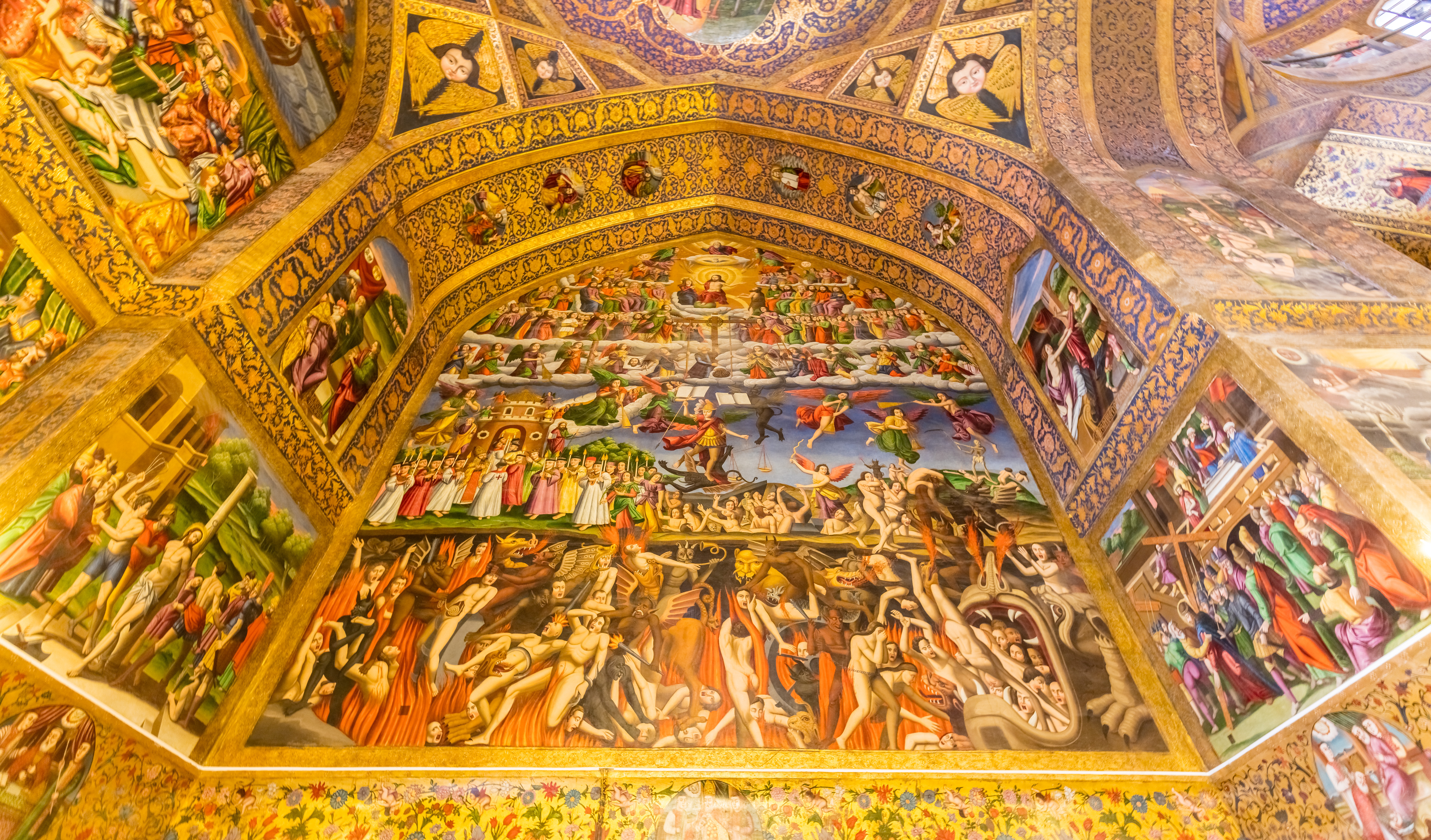
Depiction of Heaven, Earth, and Hell inside the Holy Savior Cathedral

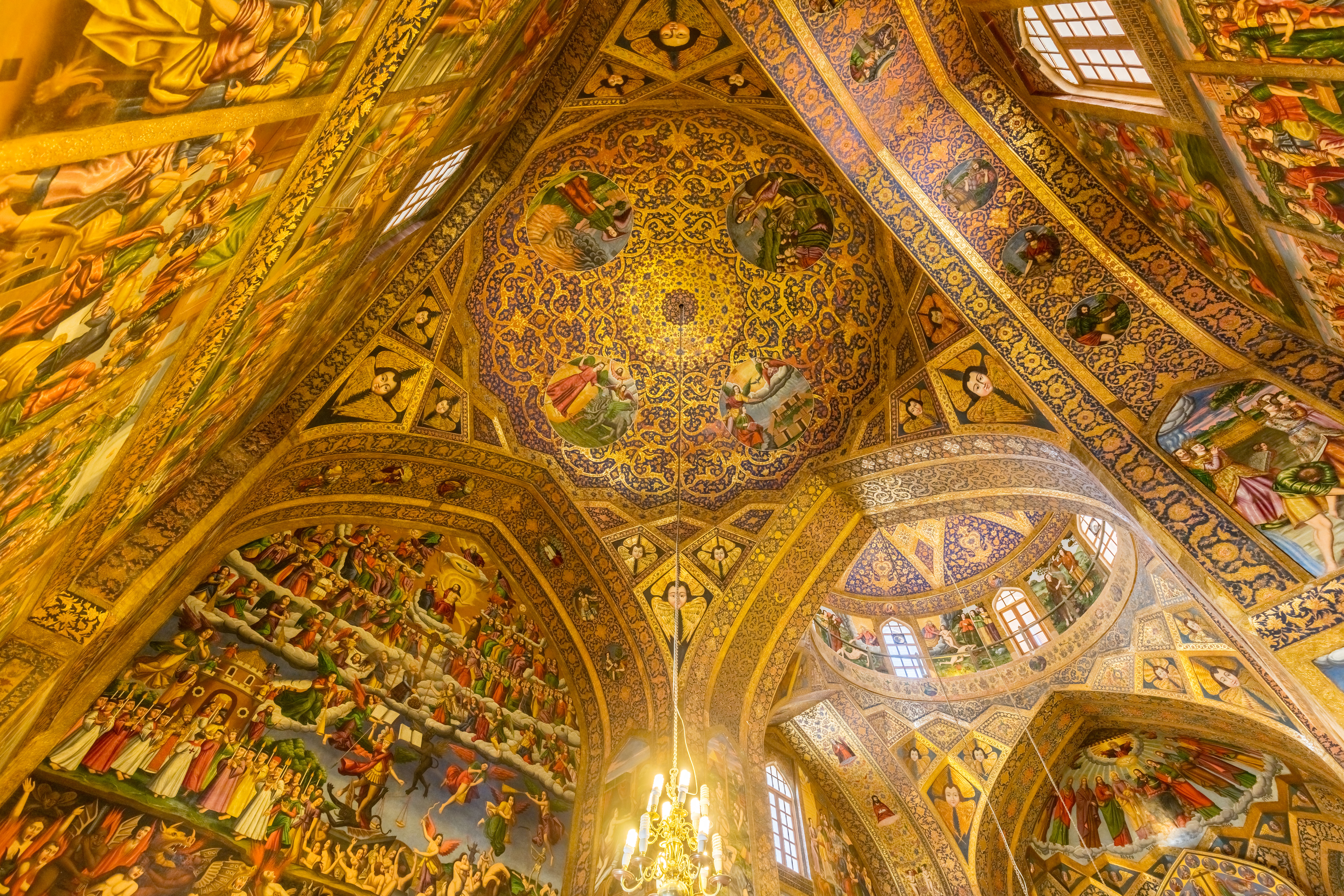
Interior view of the Holy Savior Cathedral

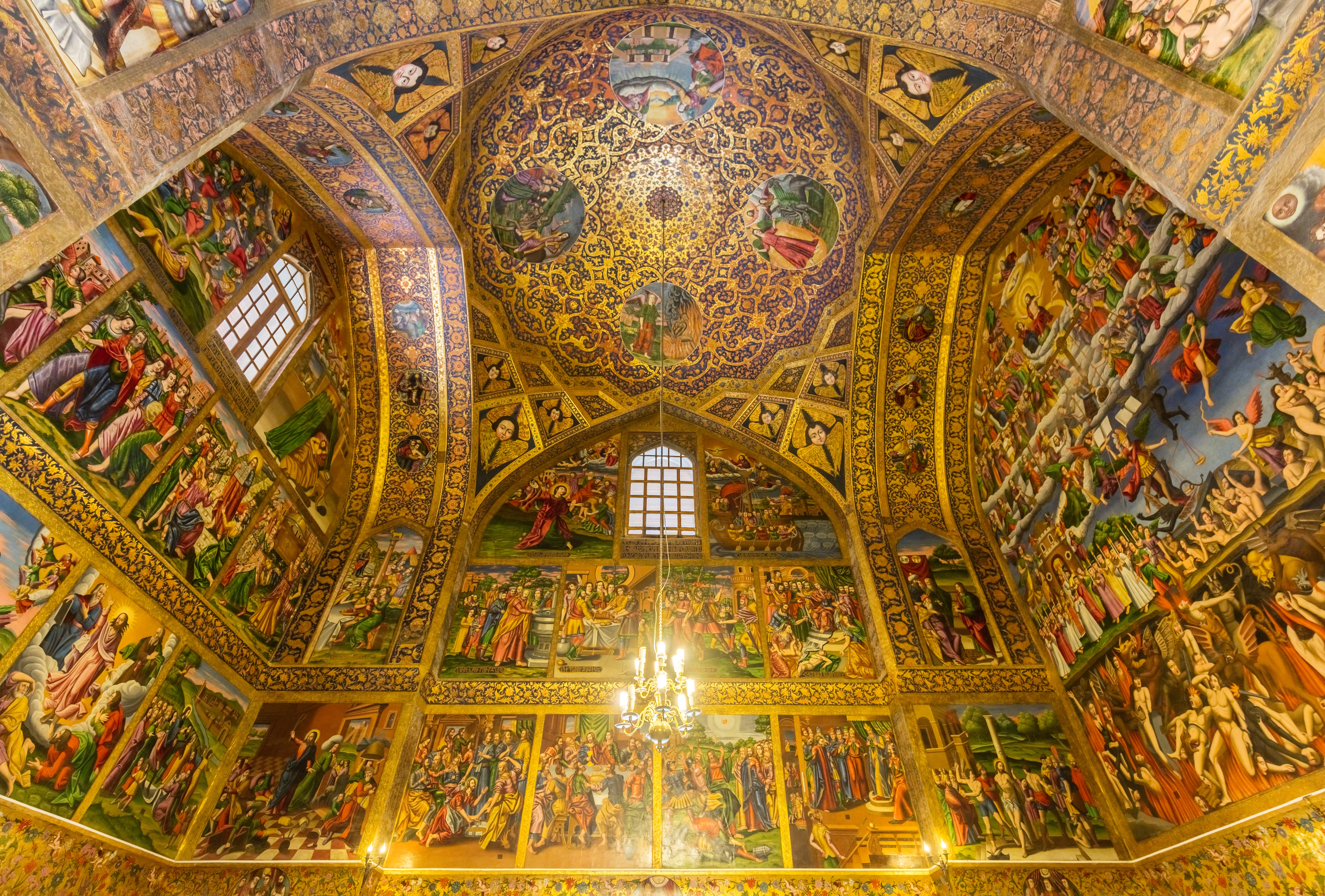
Interior view of the Holy Savior Cathedral

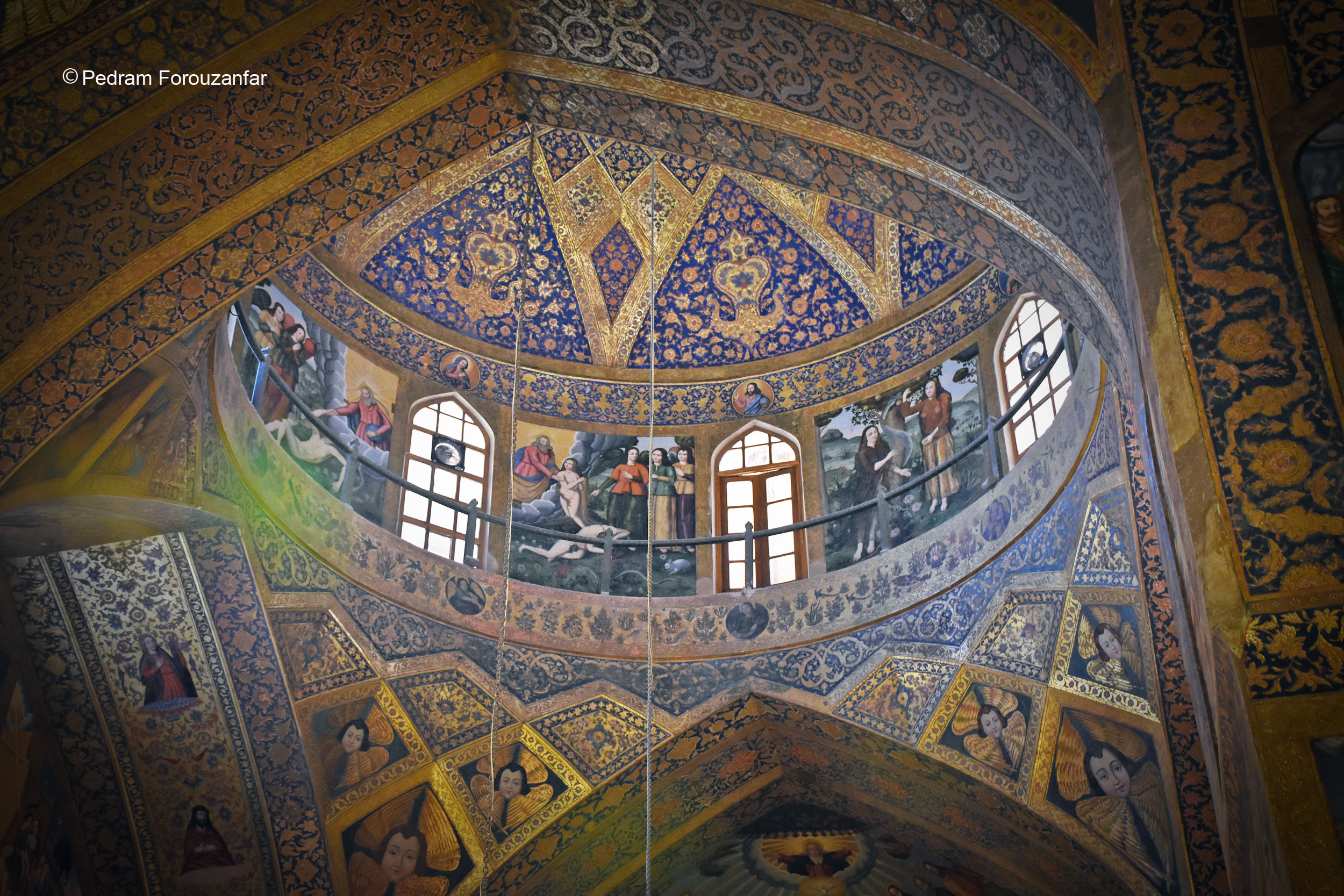
Interior of the church dome

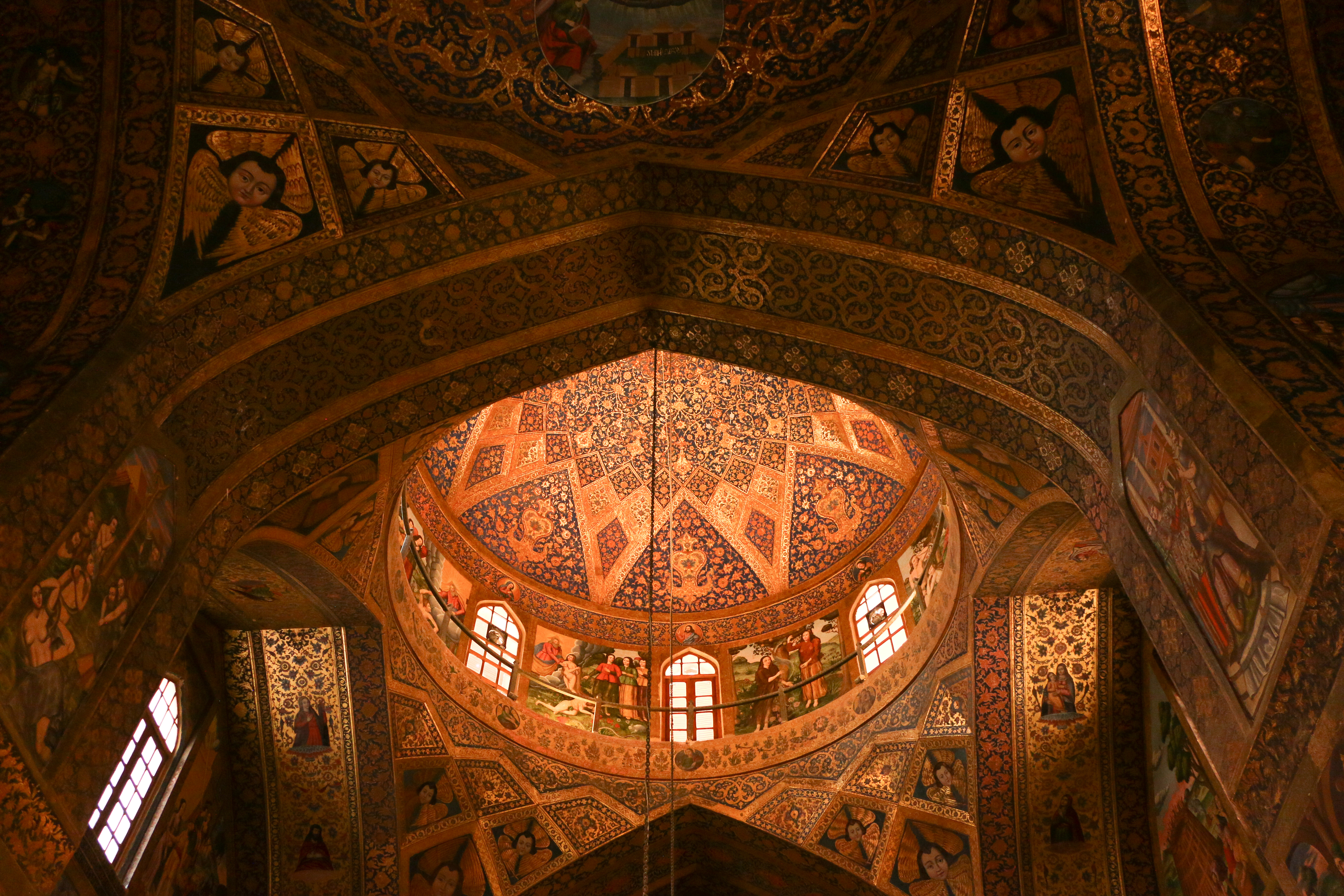

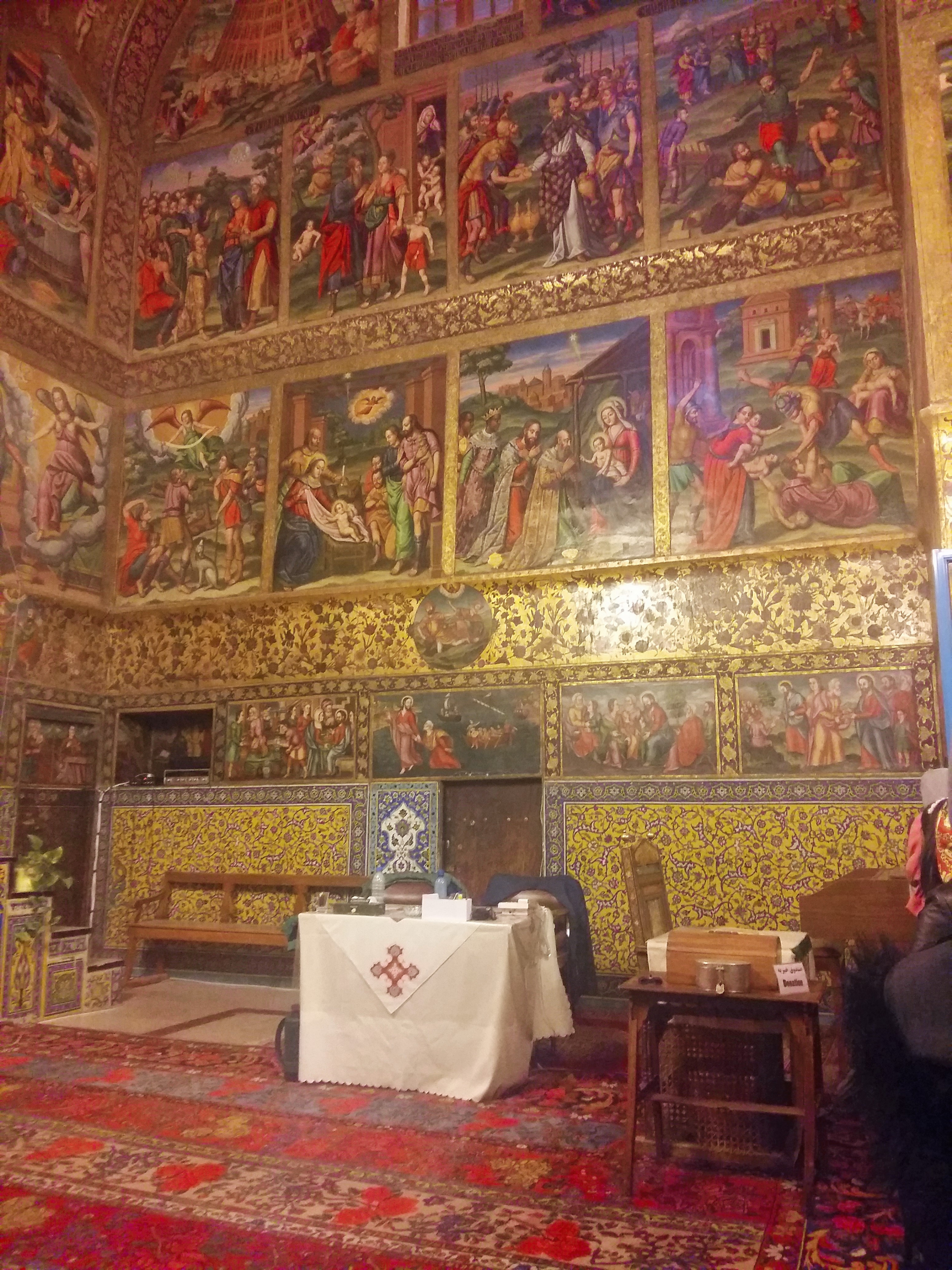

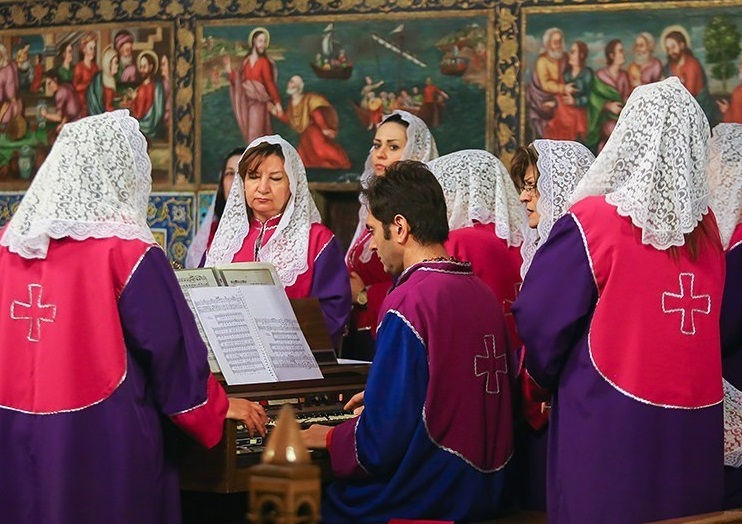
New Year's Eve celebrations at the Cathedral

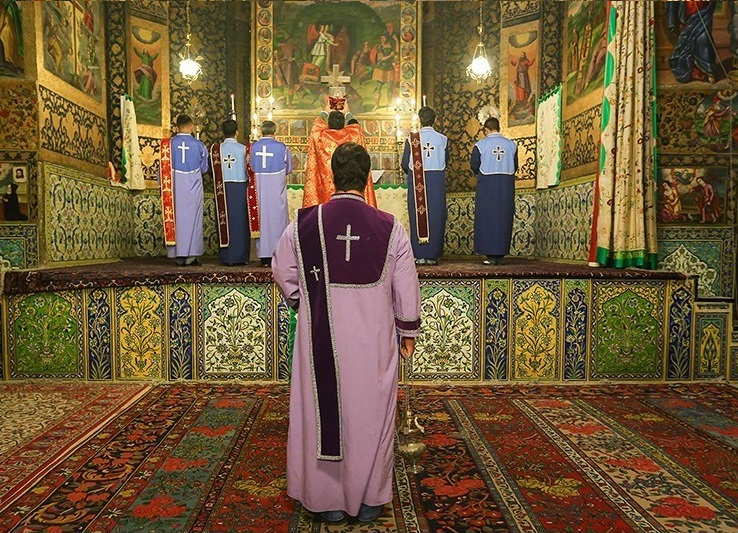

== Courtyard ==
The courtyard contains a large freestanding belfry towering over the graves of both Orthodox and Protestant Christians. The graves include those of Sir George Malcolm, an English army officer, Alexander Decover, Russian consul and banker, and Andrew Jukes, English surgeon and agent of the British government. A tile work plaque inscribed in Armenian can be seen by the entrance to the cathedral. Graves are also placed along the exterior wall before the entrance, with inscriptions in Armenian. In one corner of the courtyard, there is a raised area with a memorial to the 1915 Armenian genocide in Turkey. Across the courtyard and facing the cathedral, there is a building housing a library and museum. Outside of this building are several carved stones showing scenes from the Bible.

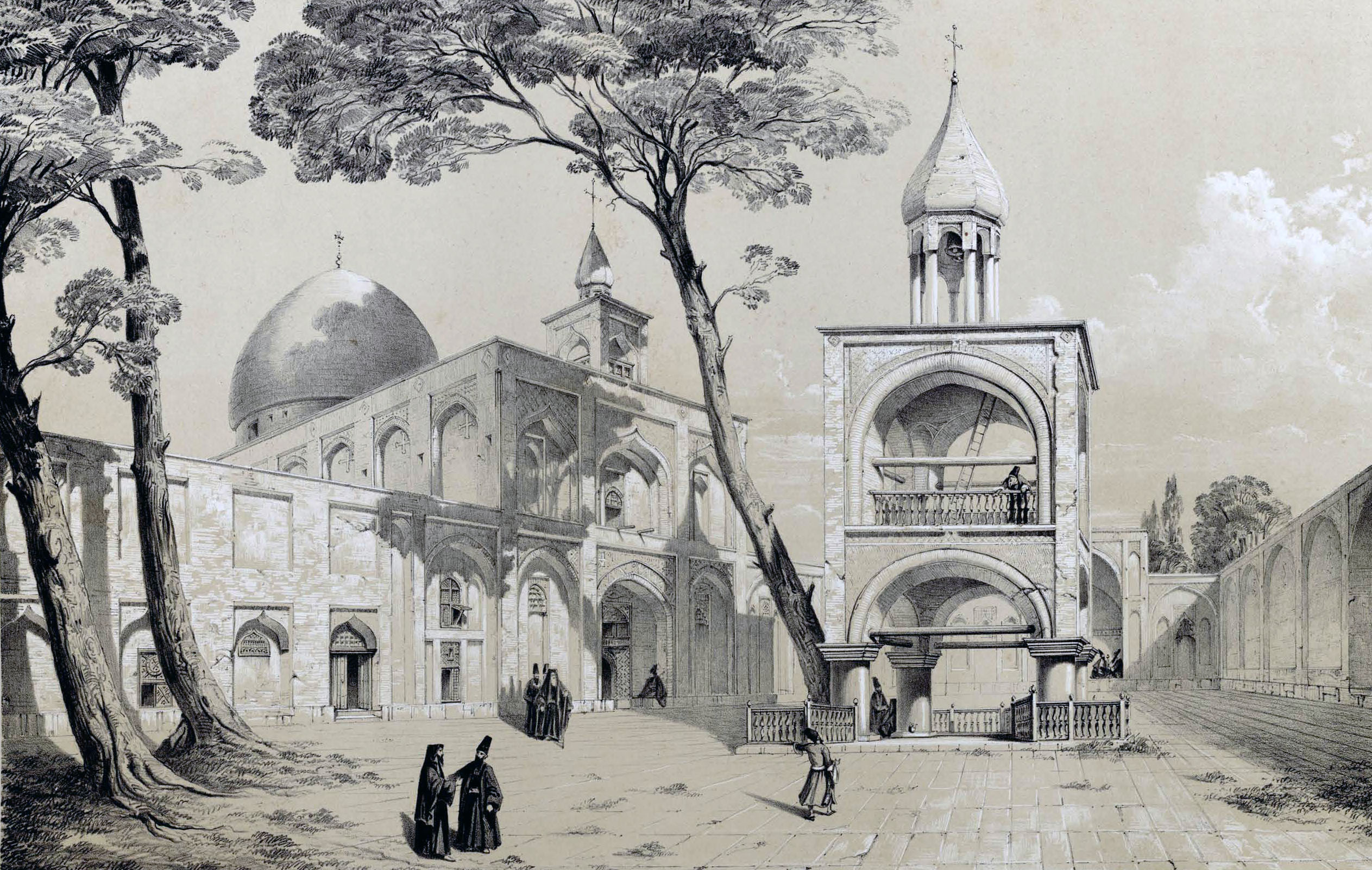
Painting of the Cathedrl in 1840s by Eugène Flandin

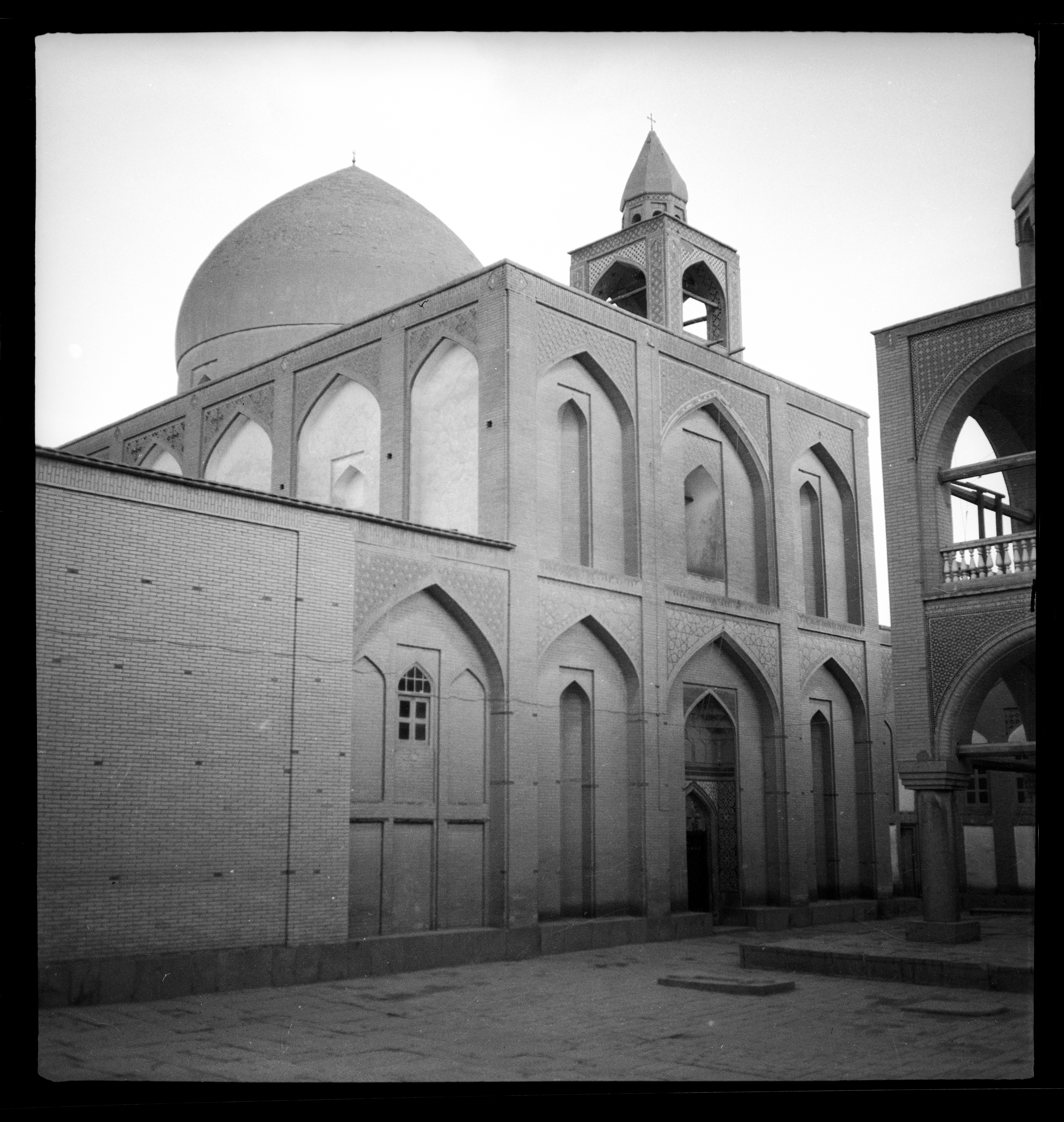
The Cathedral in early 20th century

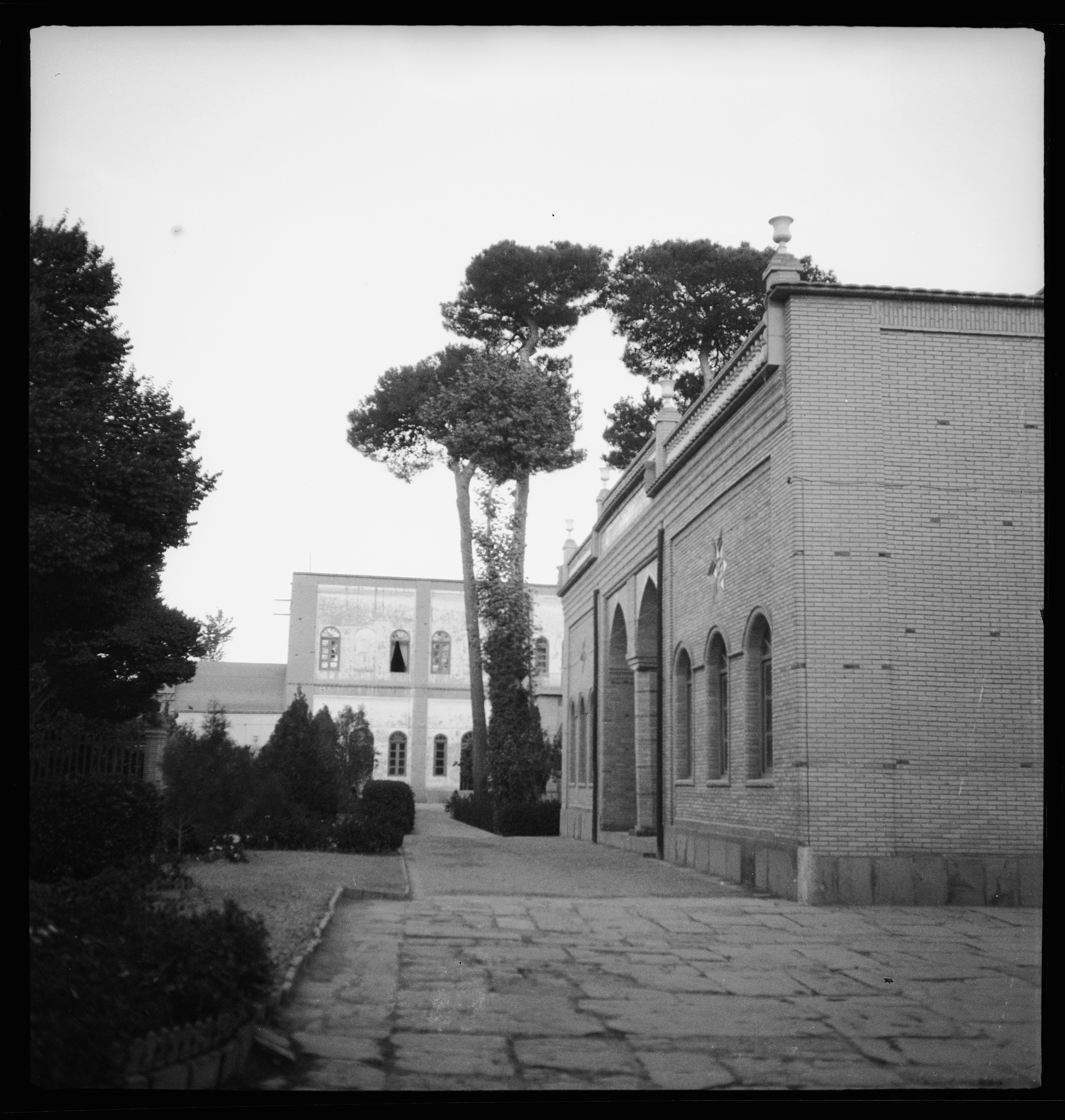

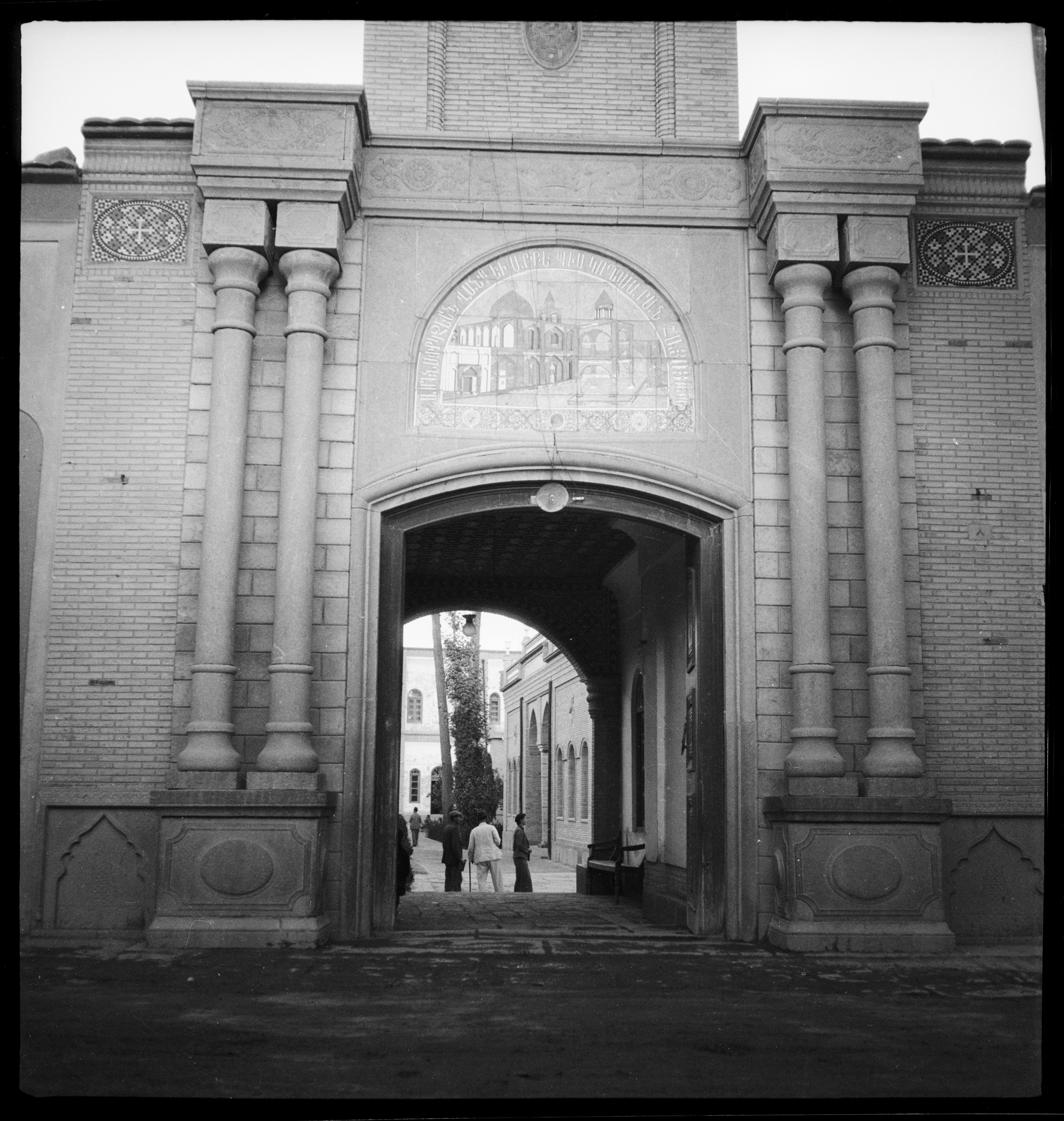

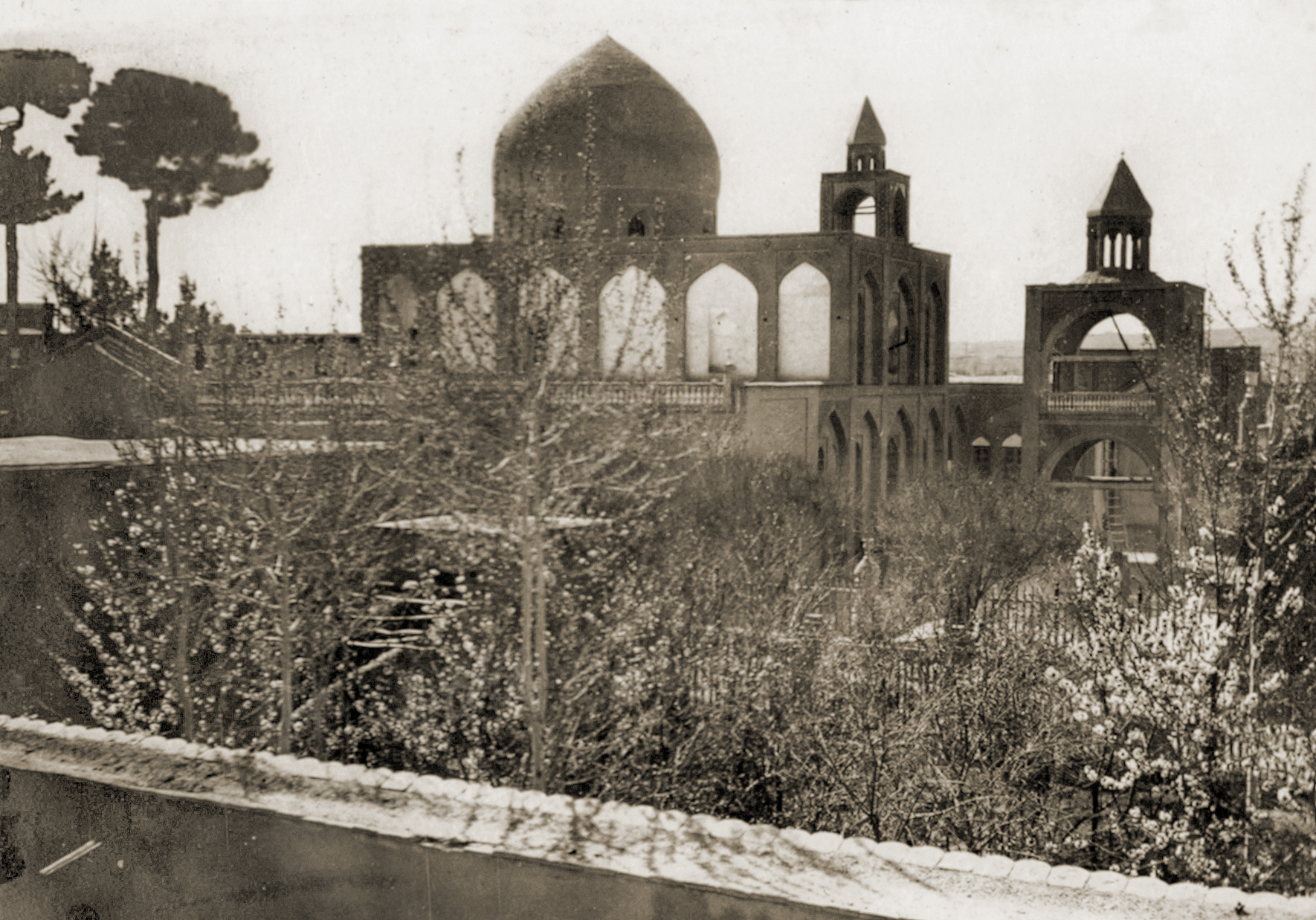
The Cathedral in 1930s

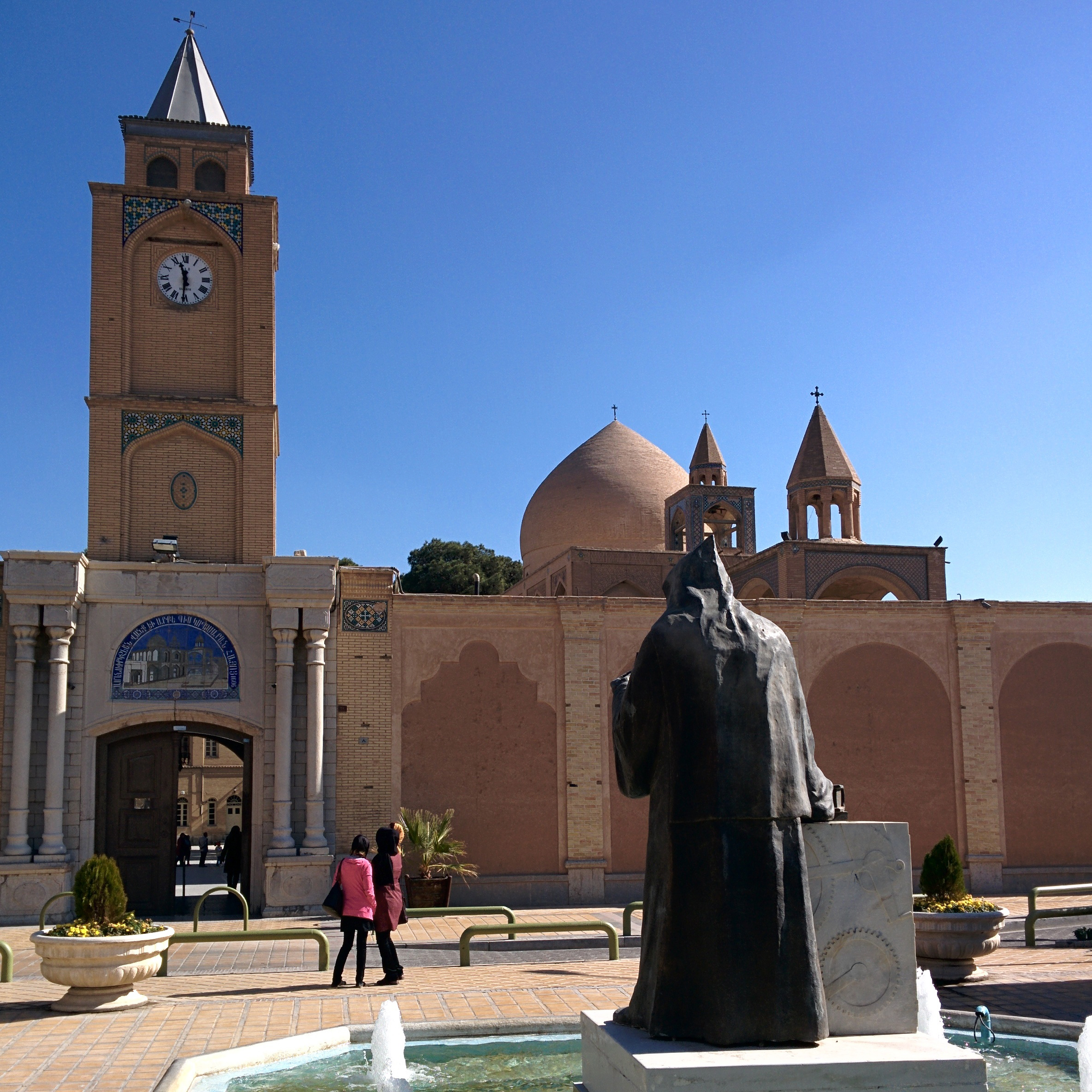
Entrance of the courtyard

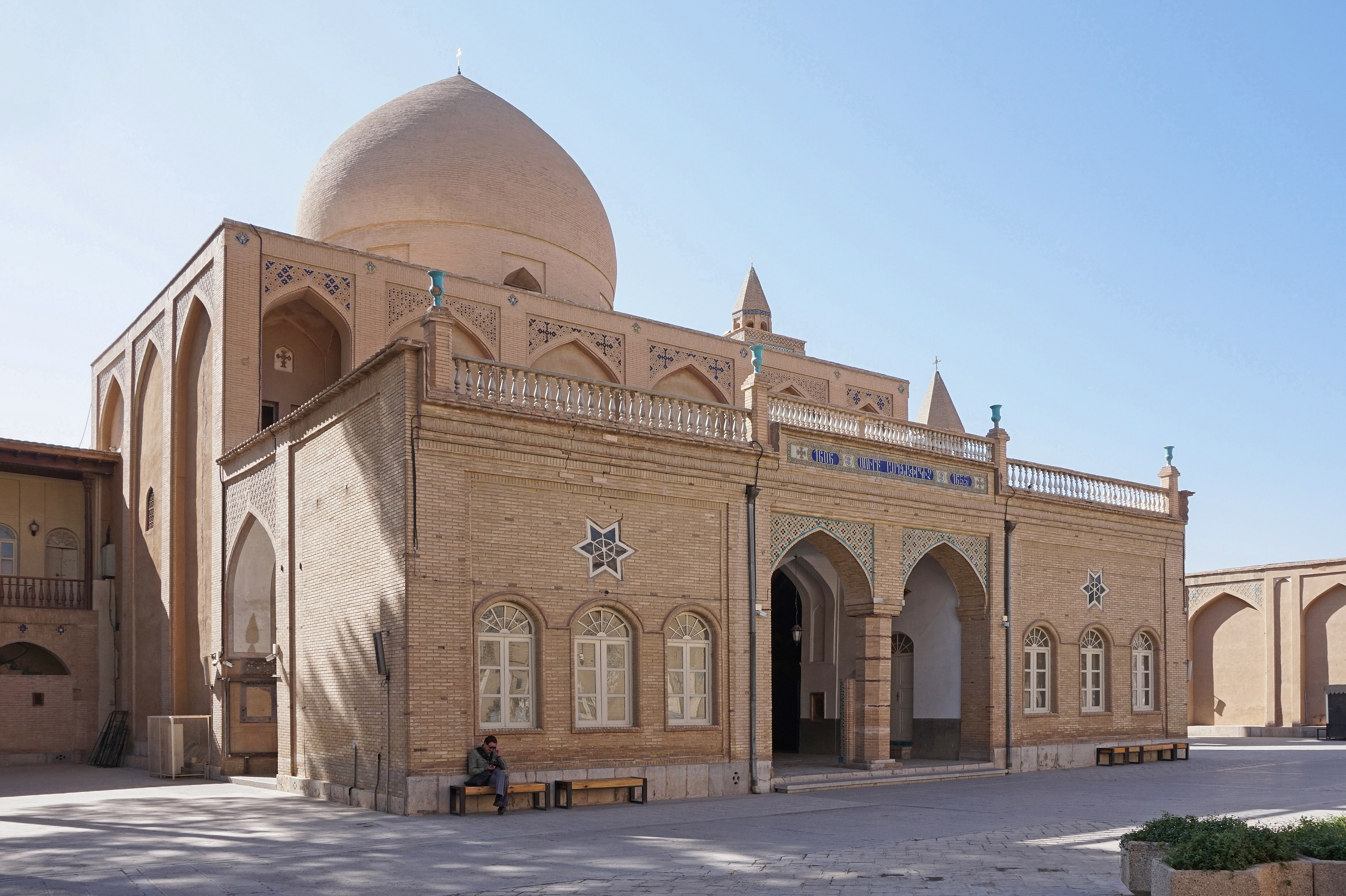
The Cathedral

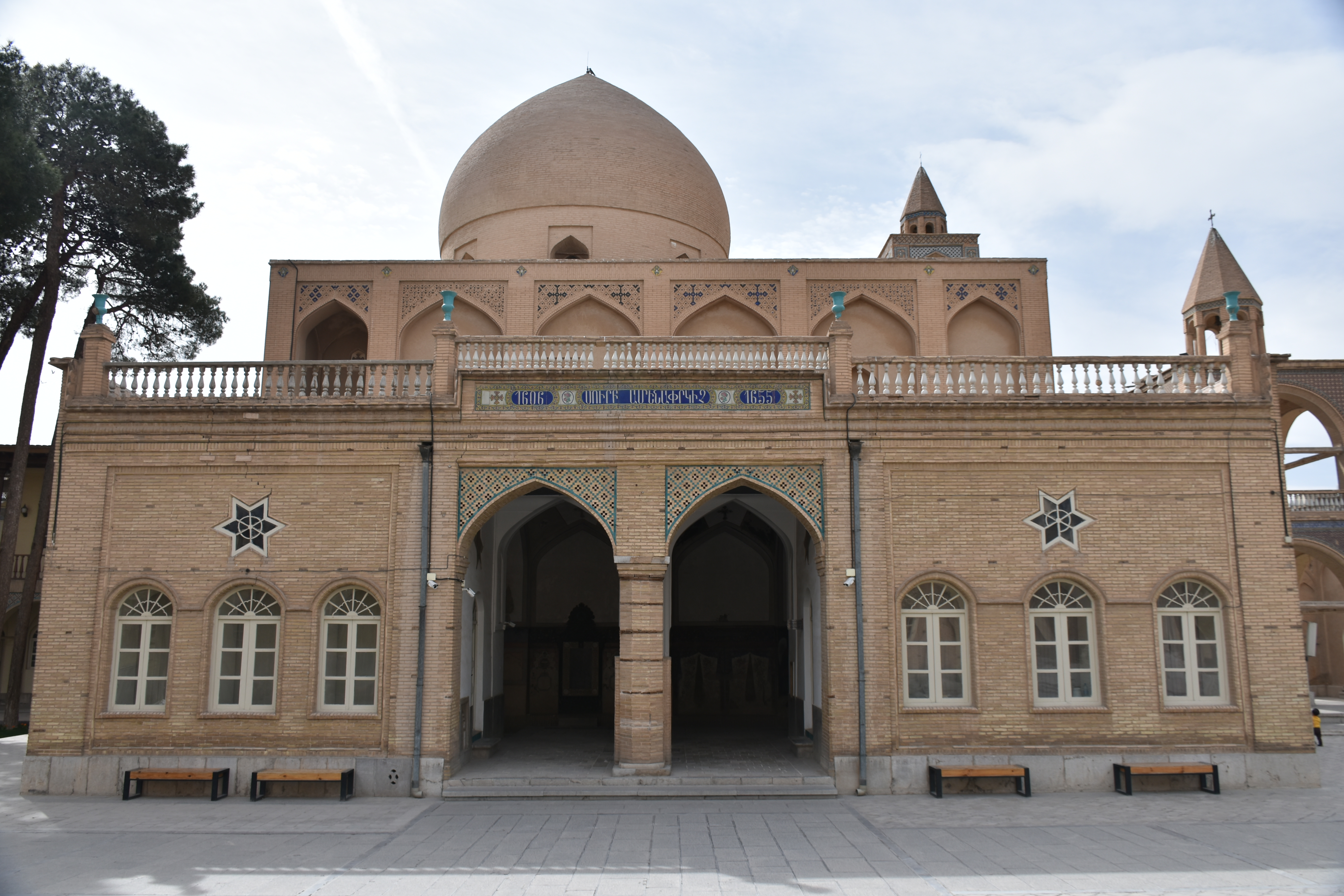

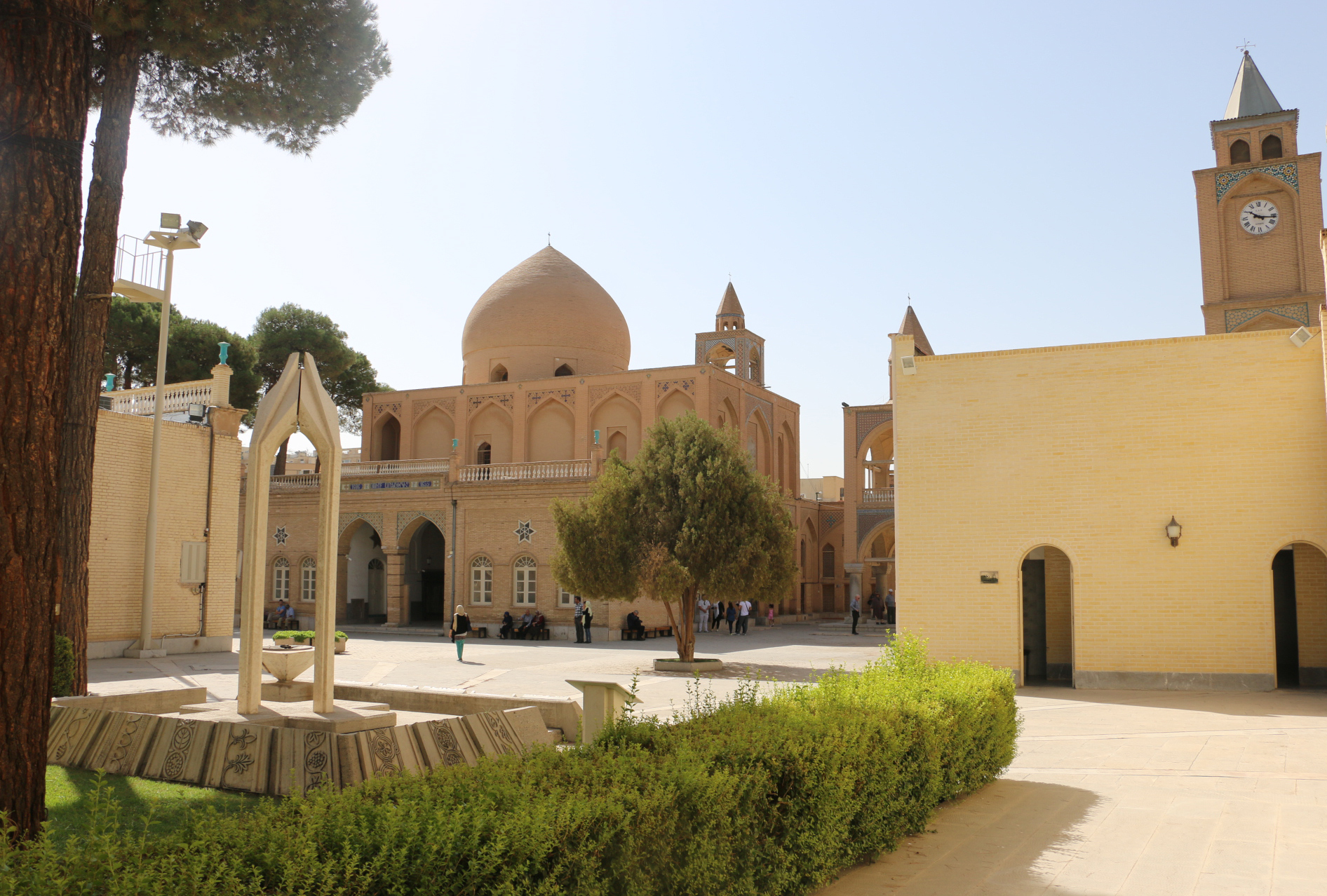

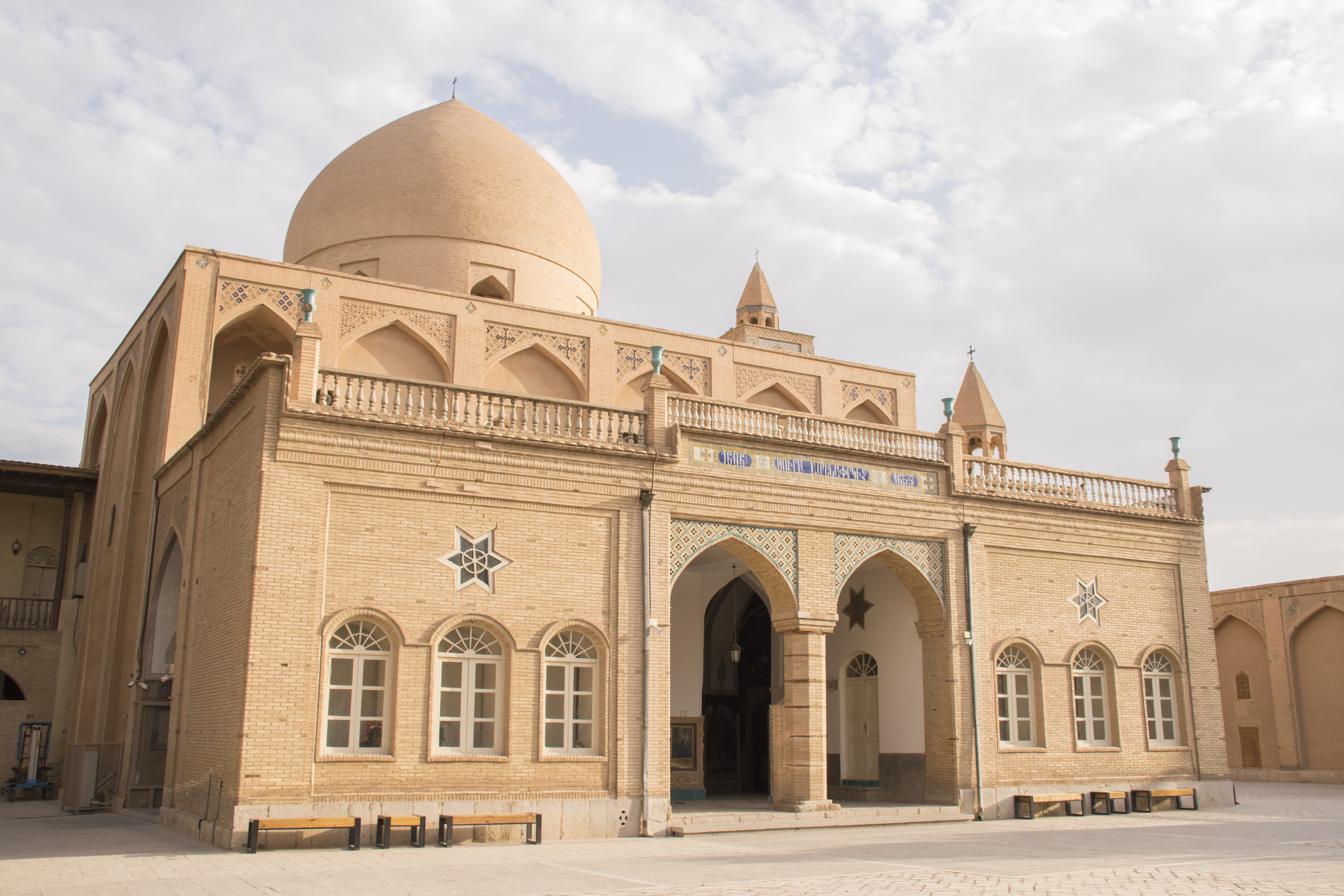

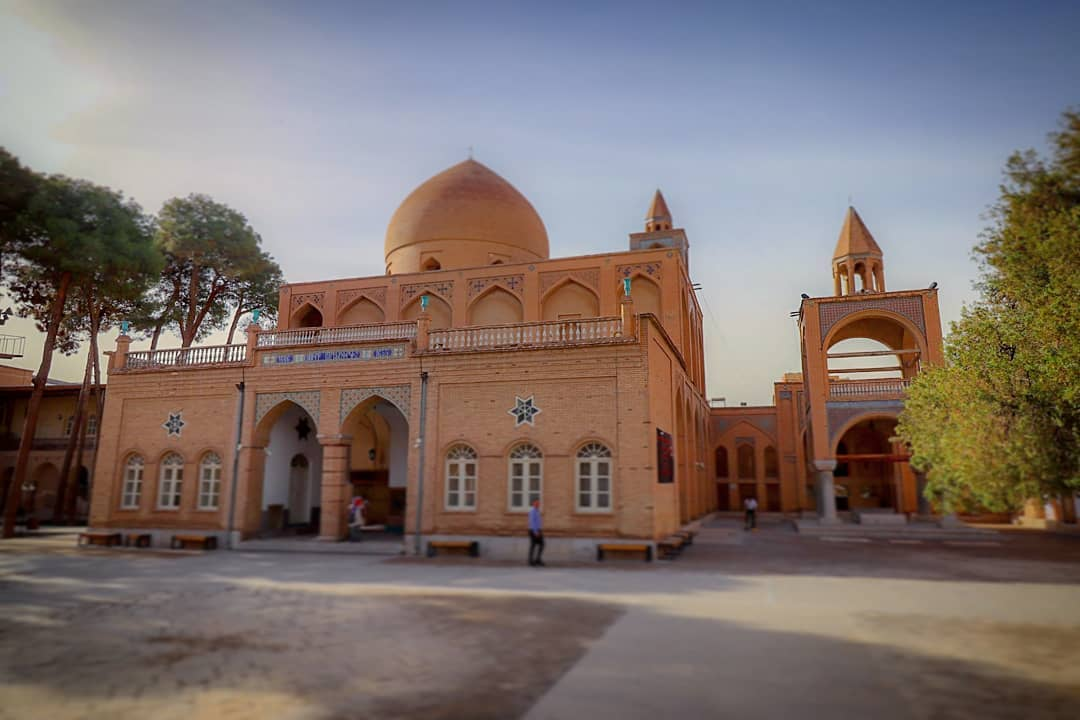

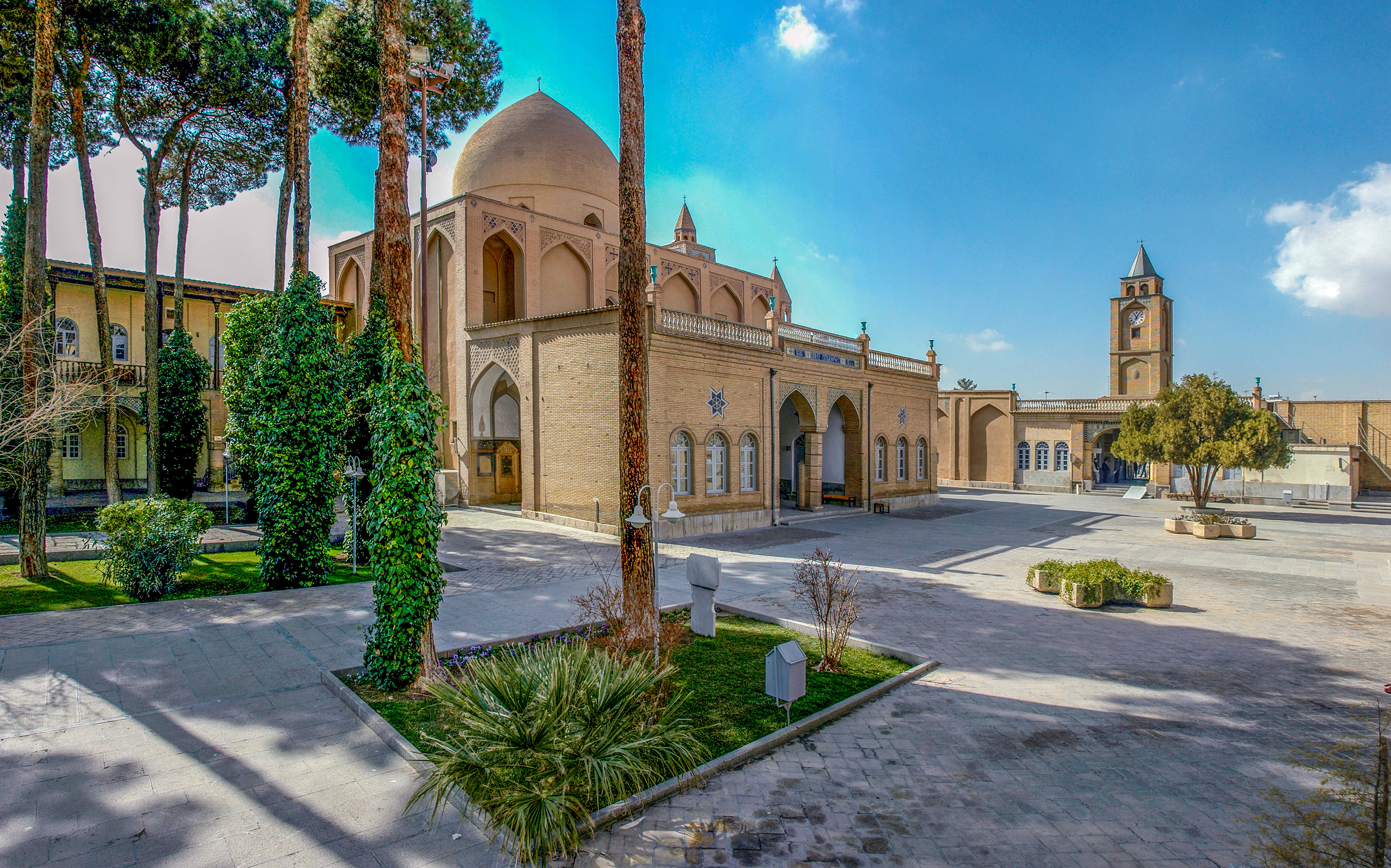

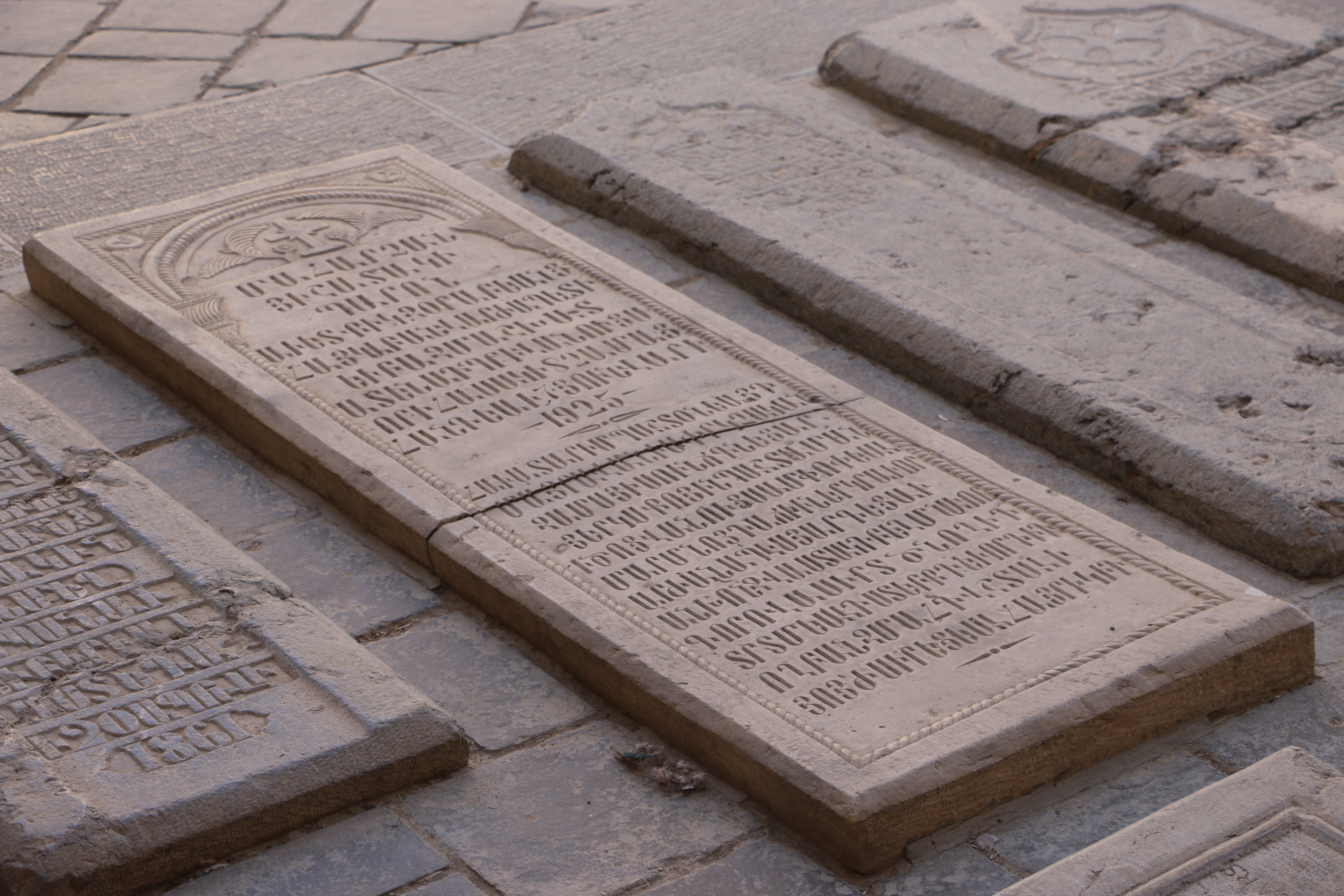

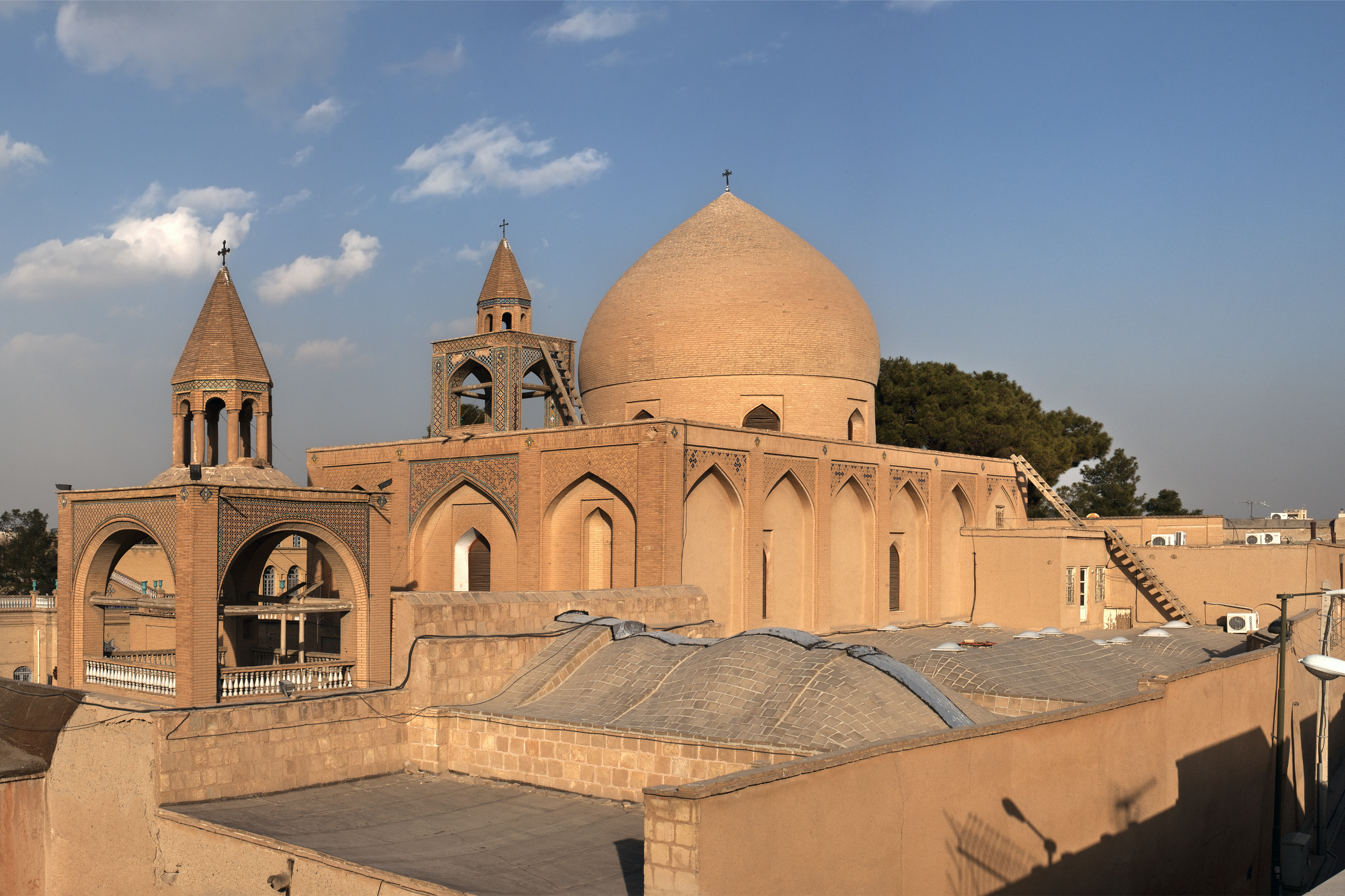

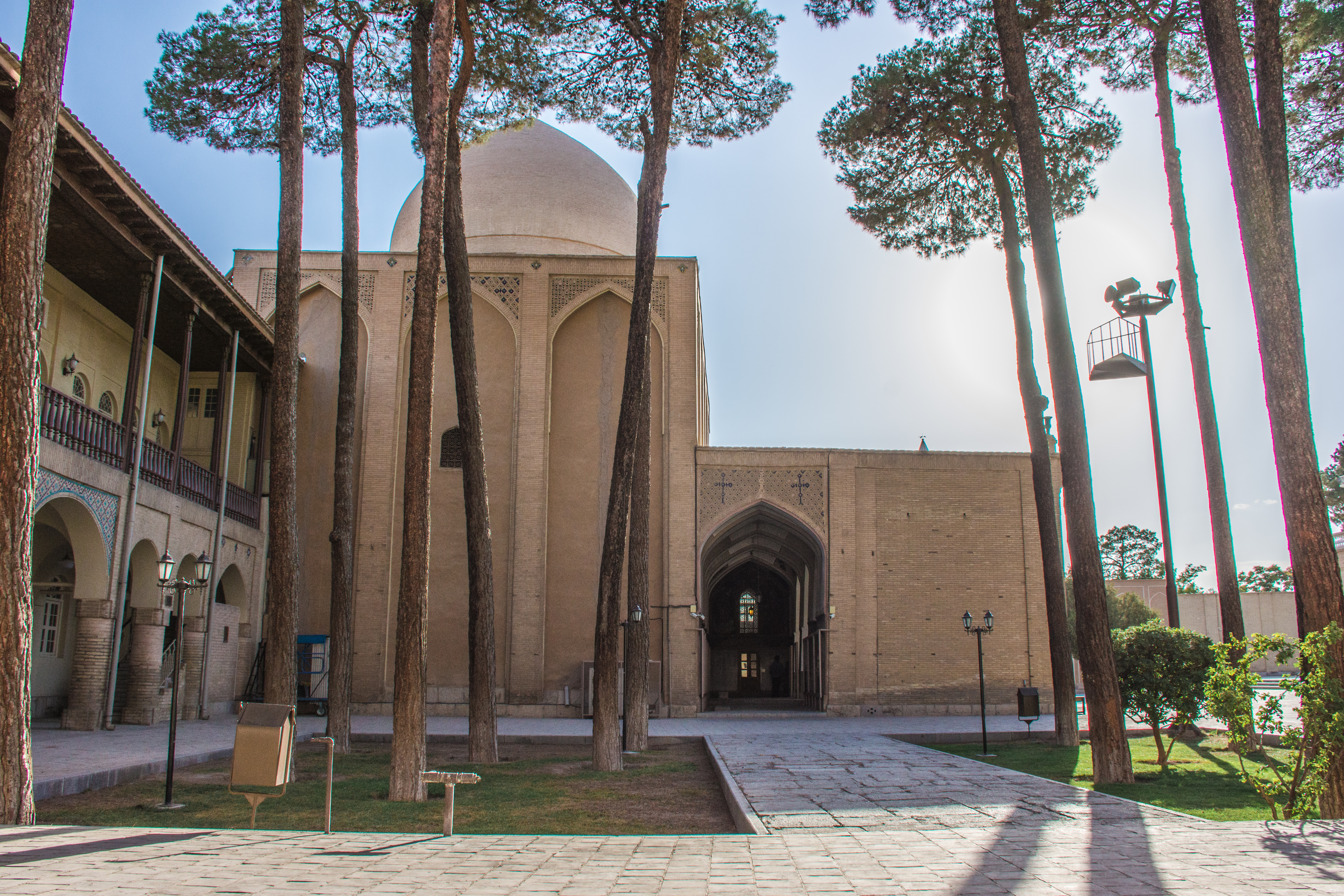

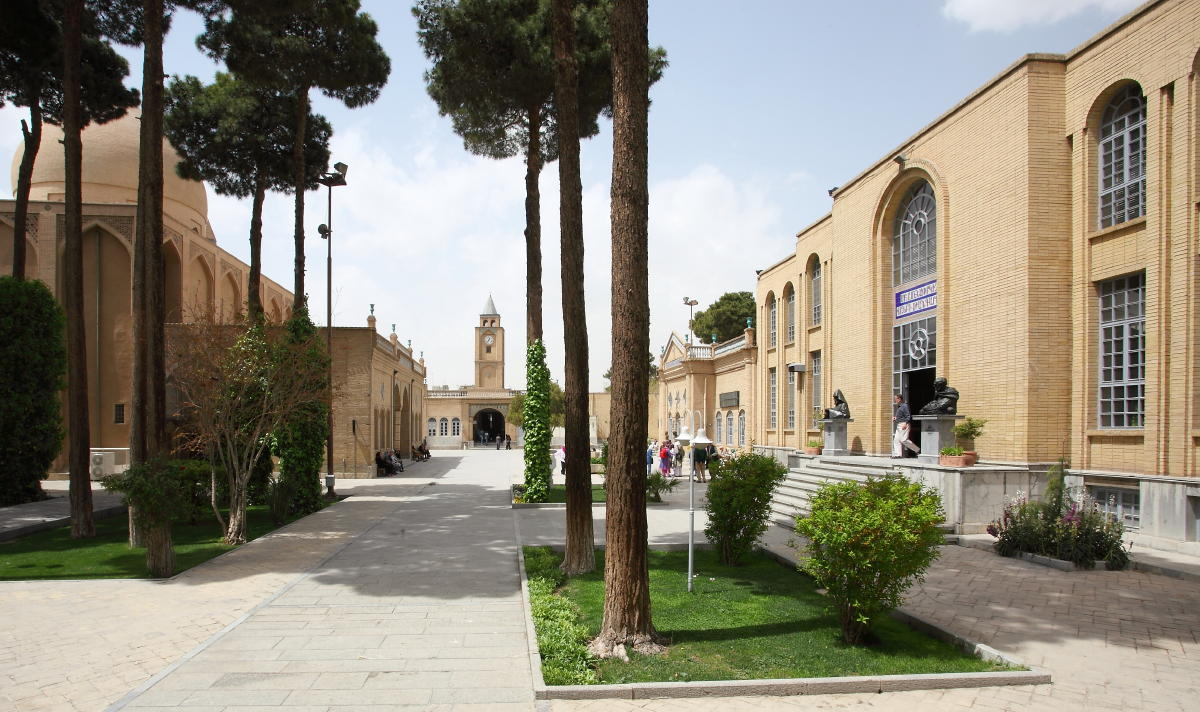
The courtyard of the Holy Savior Cathedral

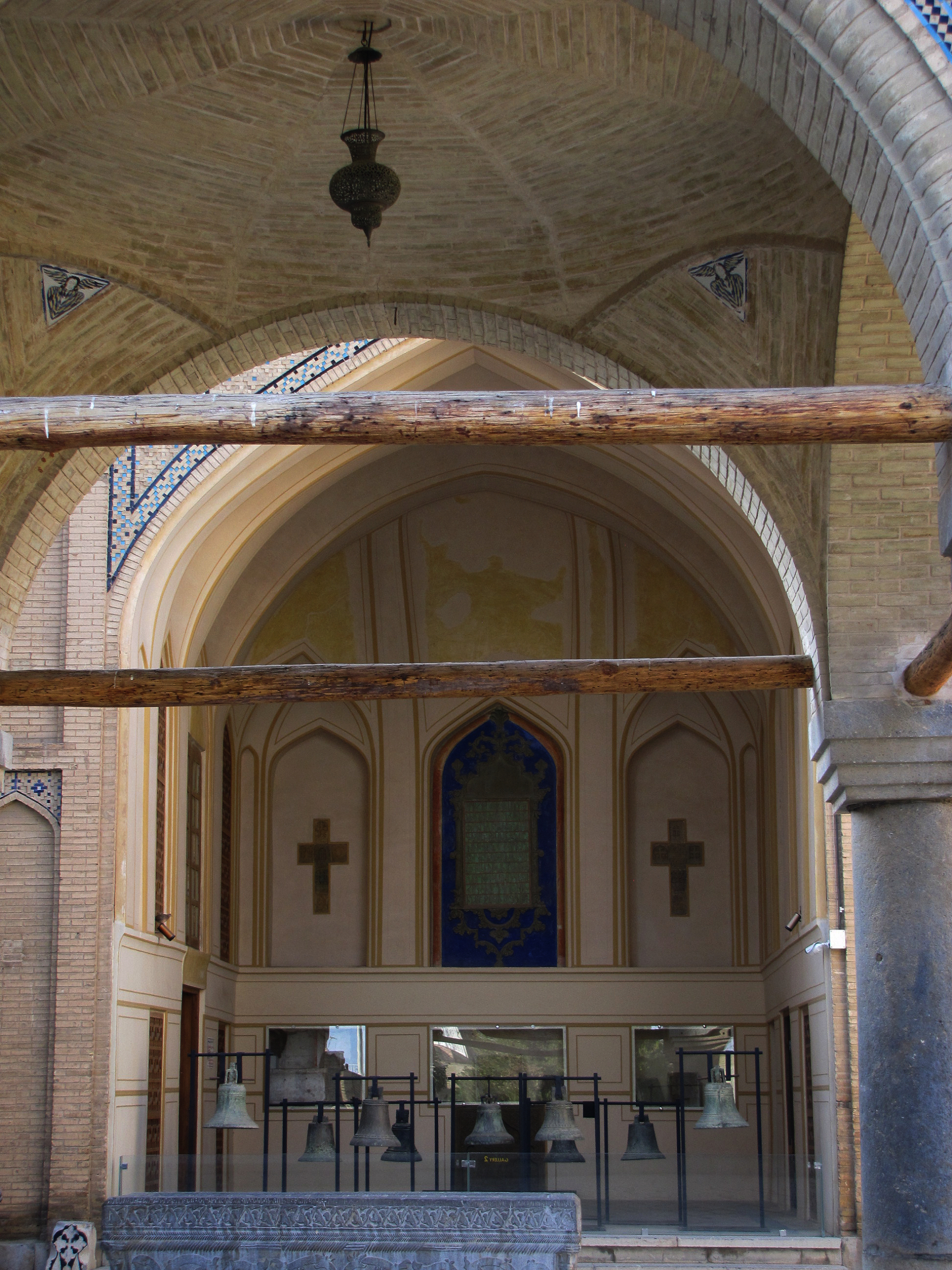

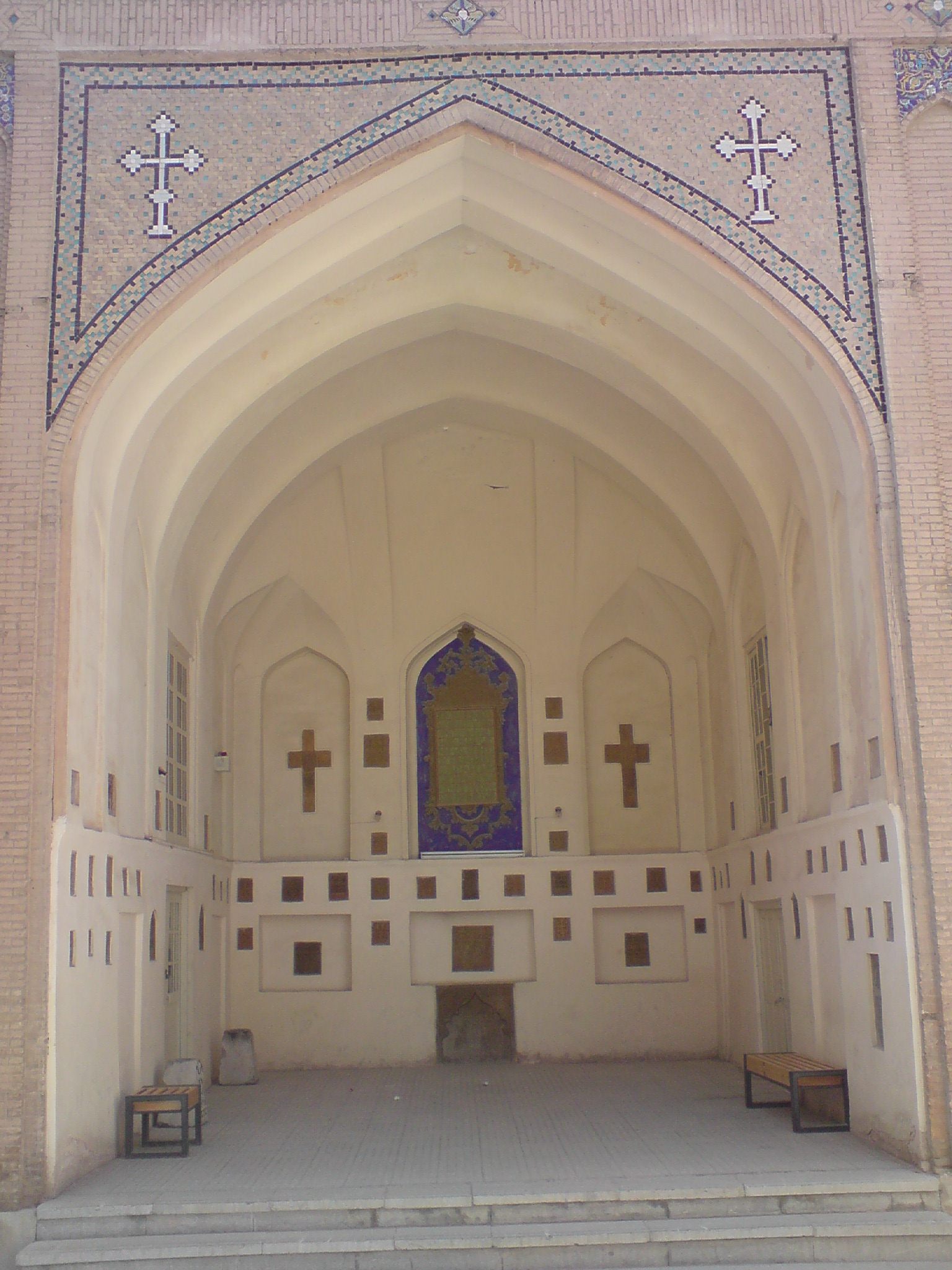

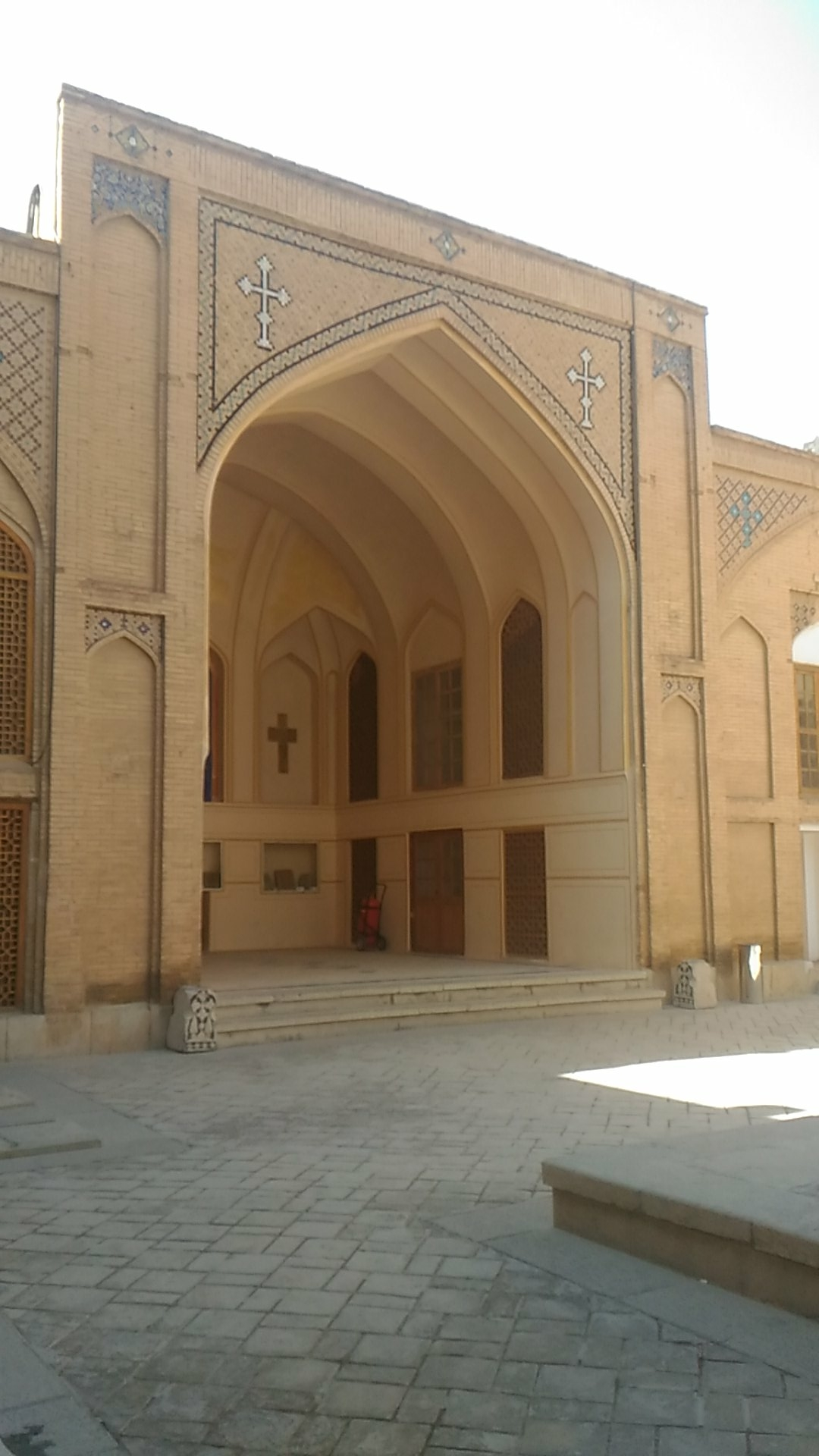

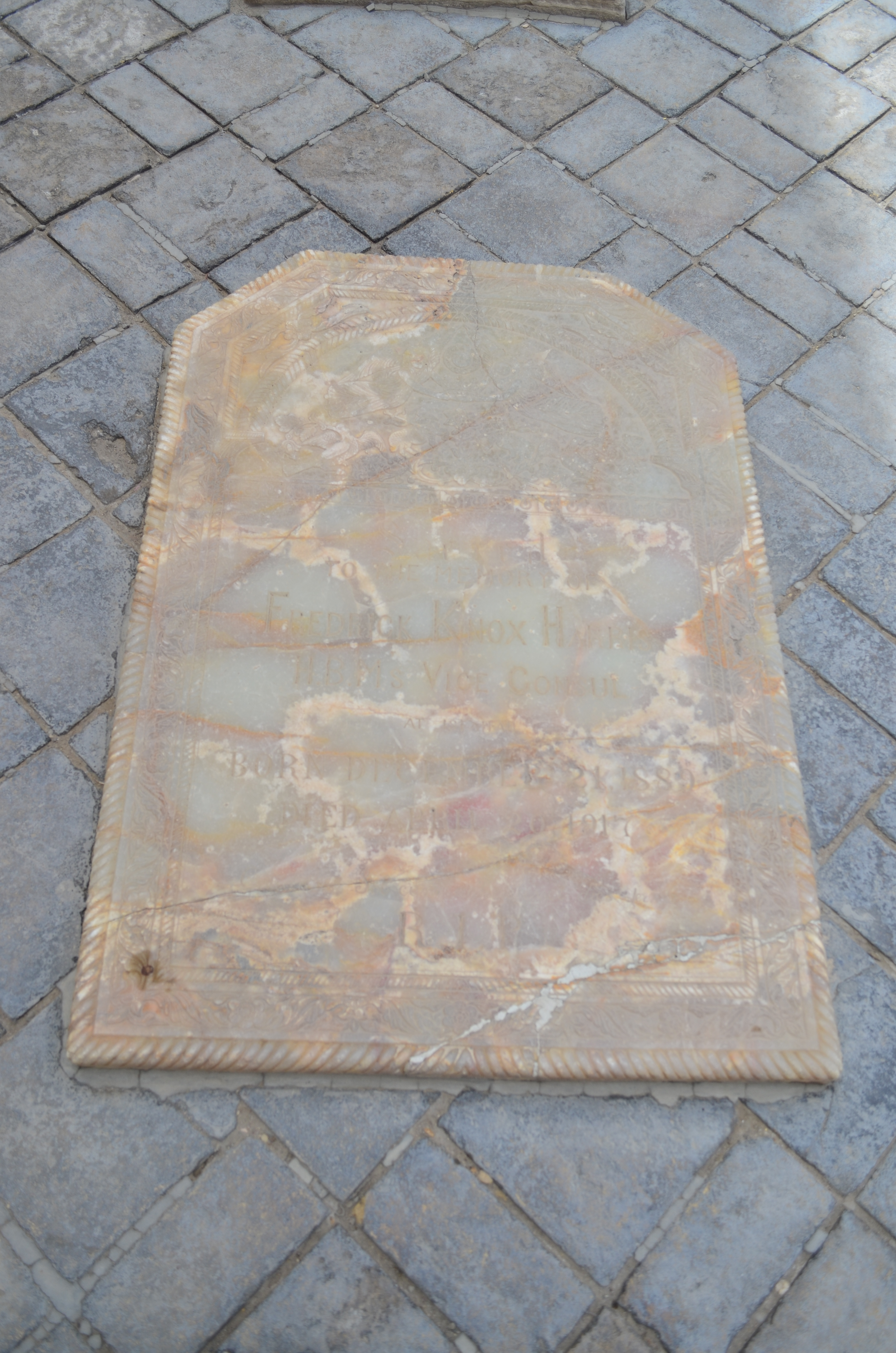

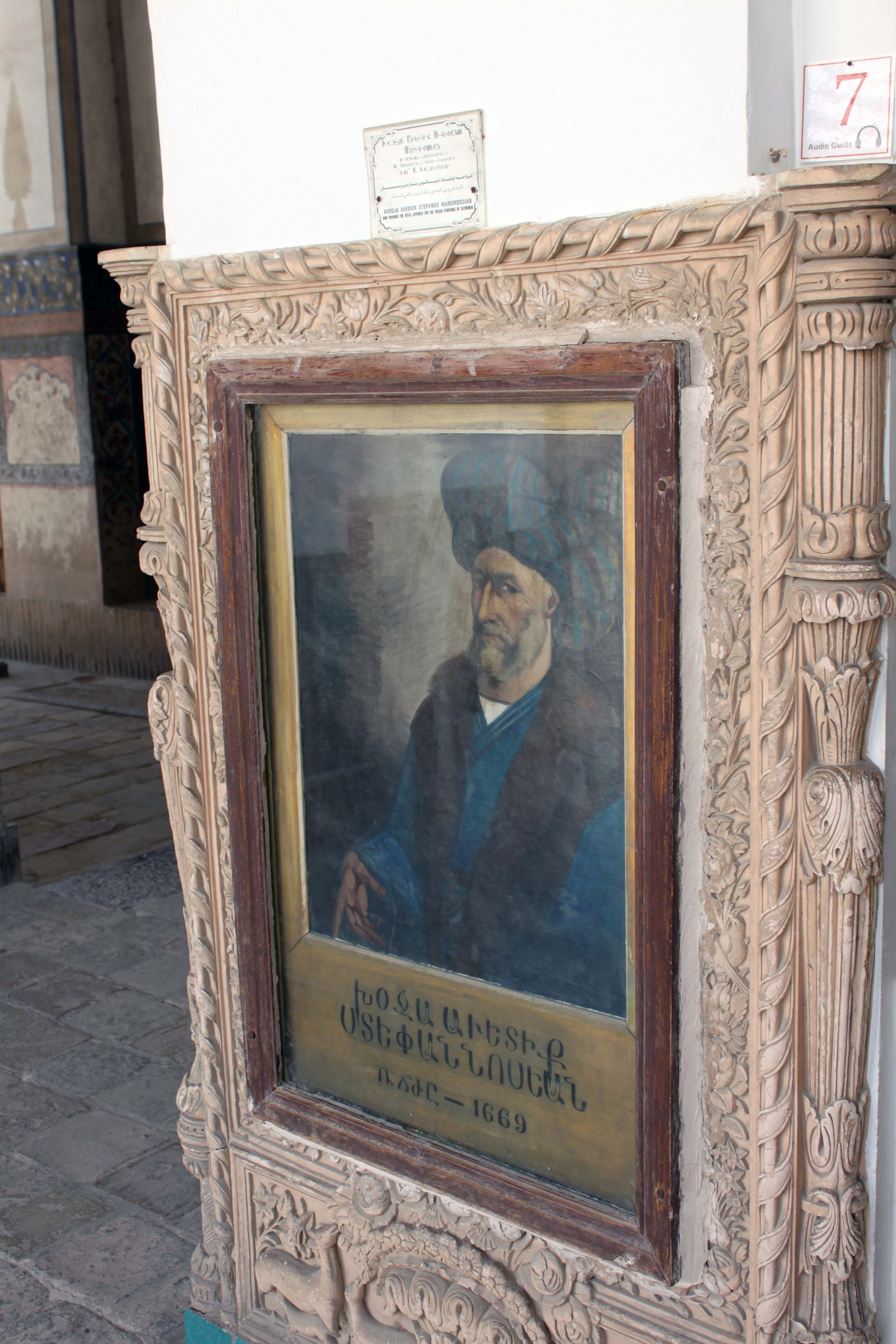

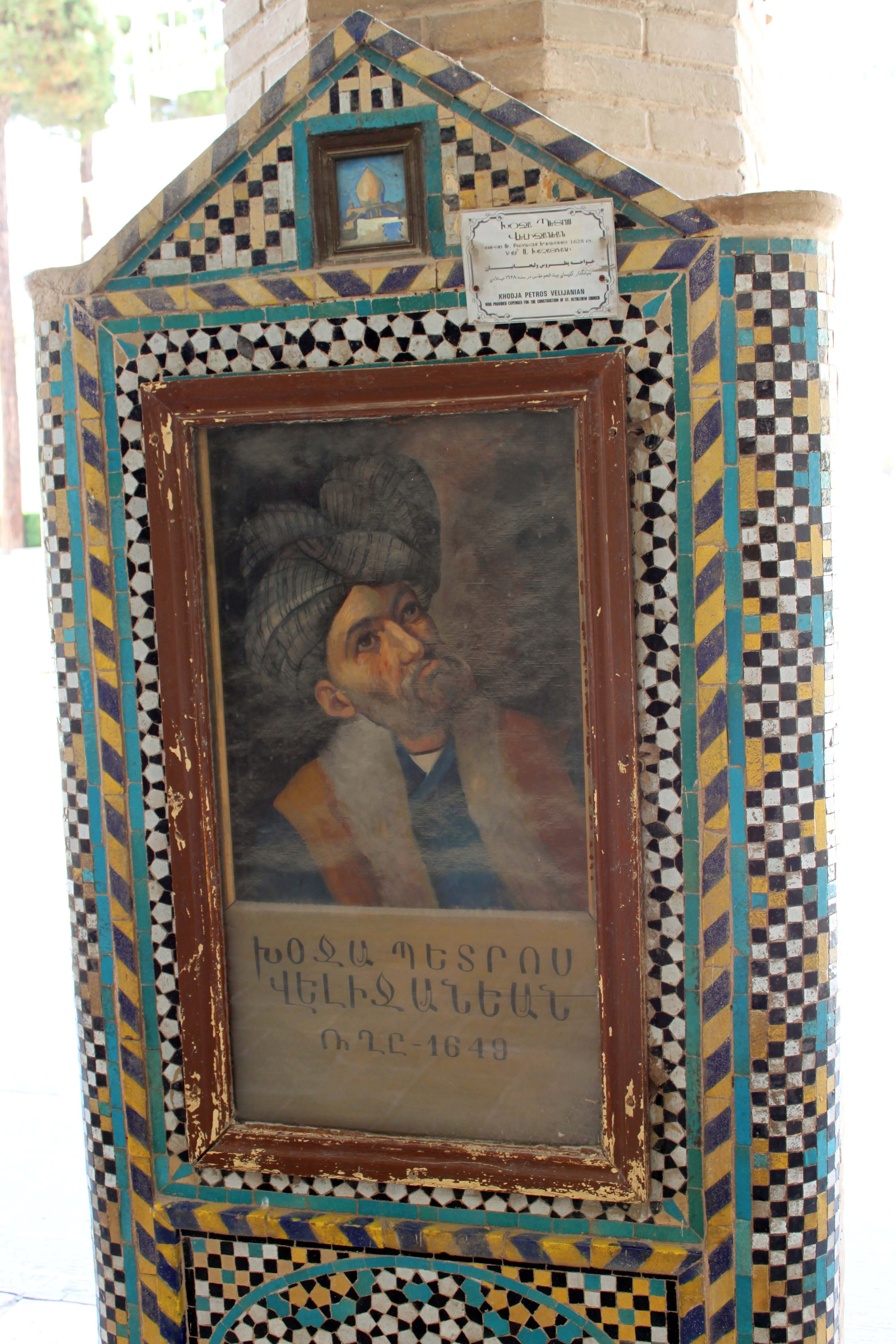

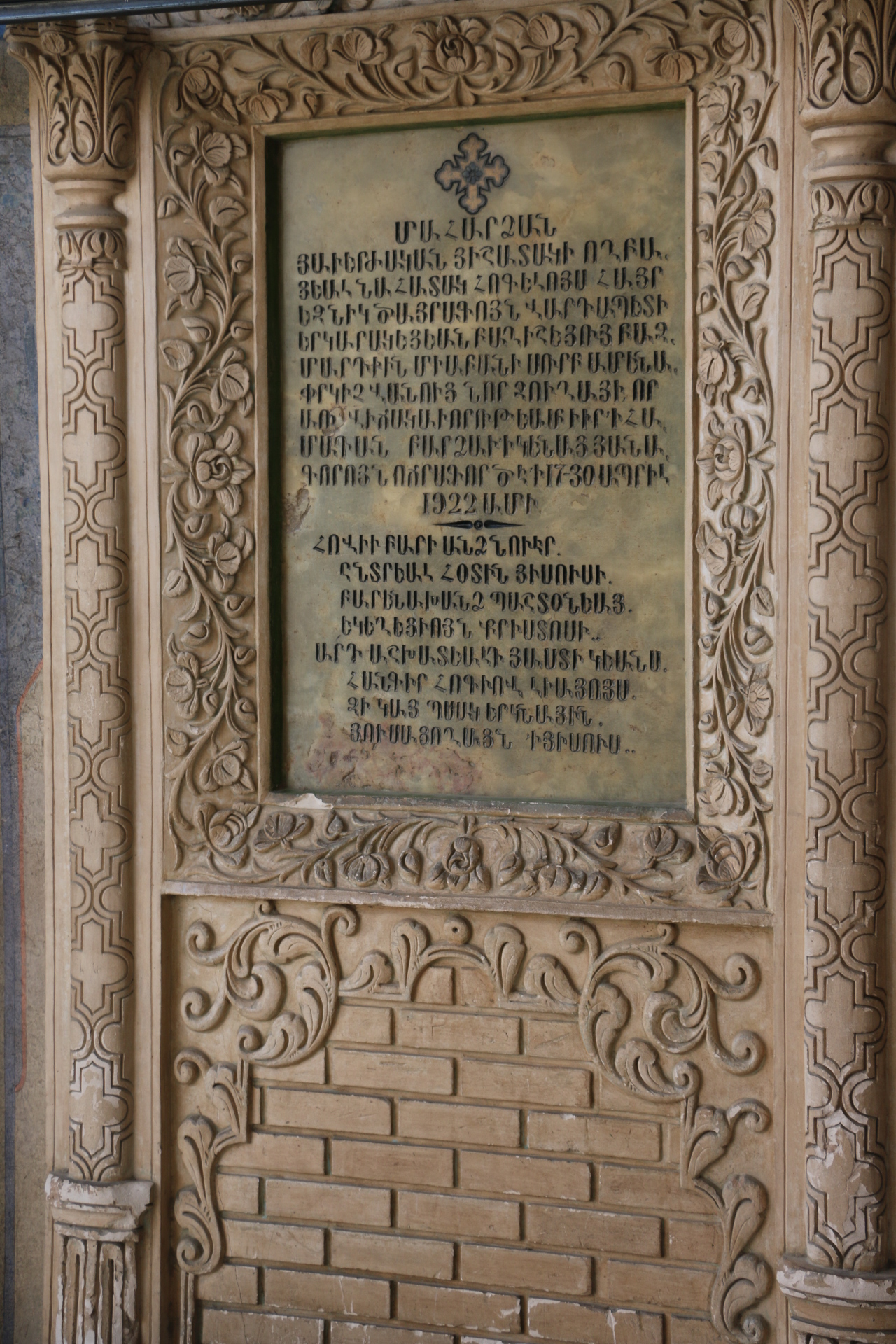

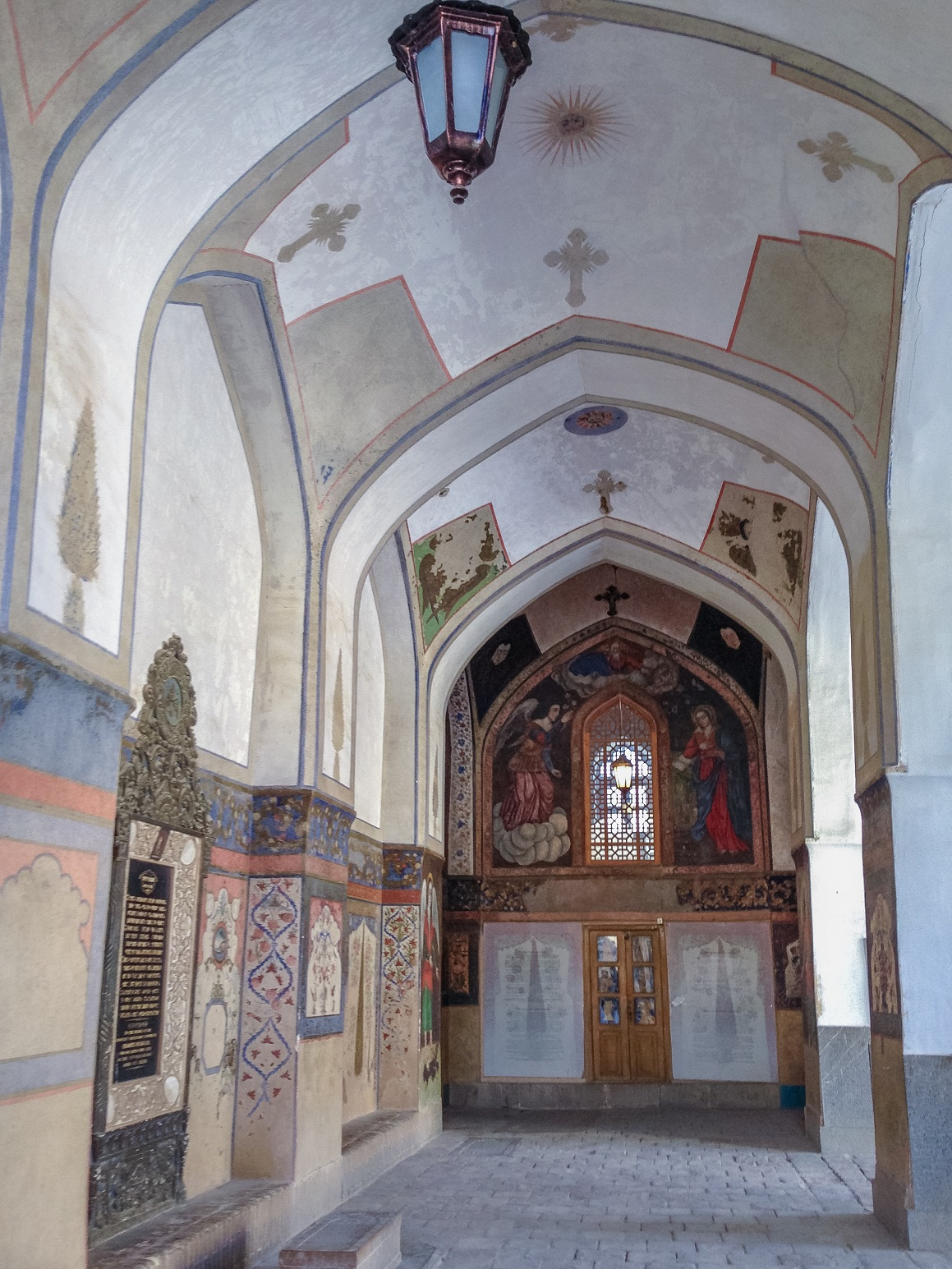
Main gate of the Holy Saviour Cathedral

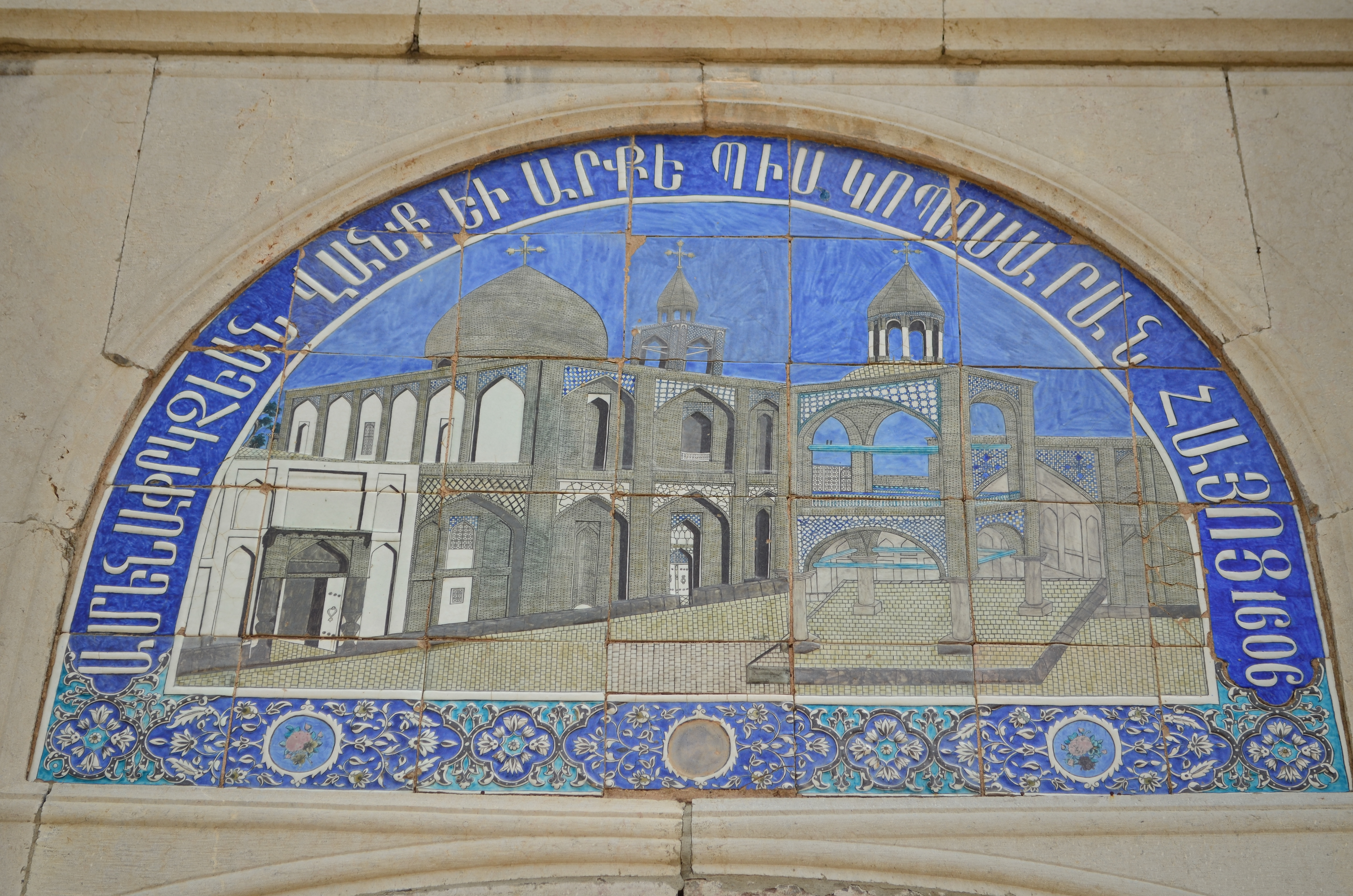

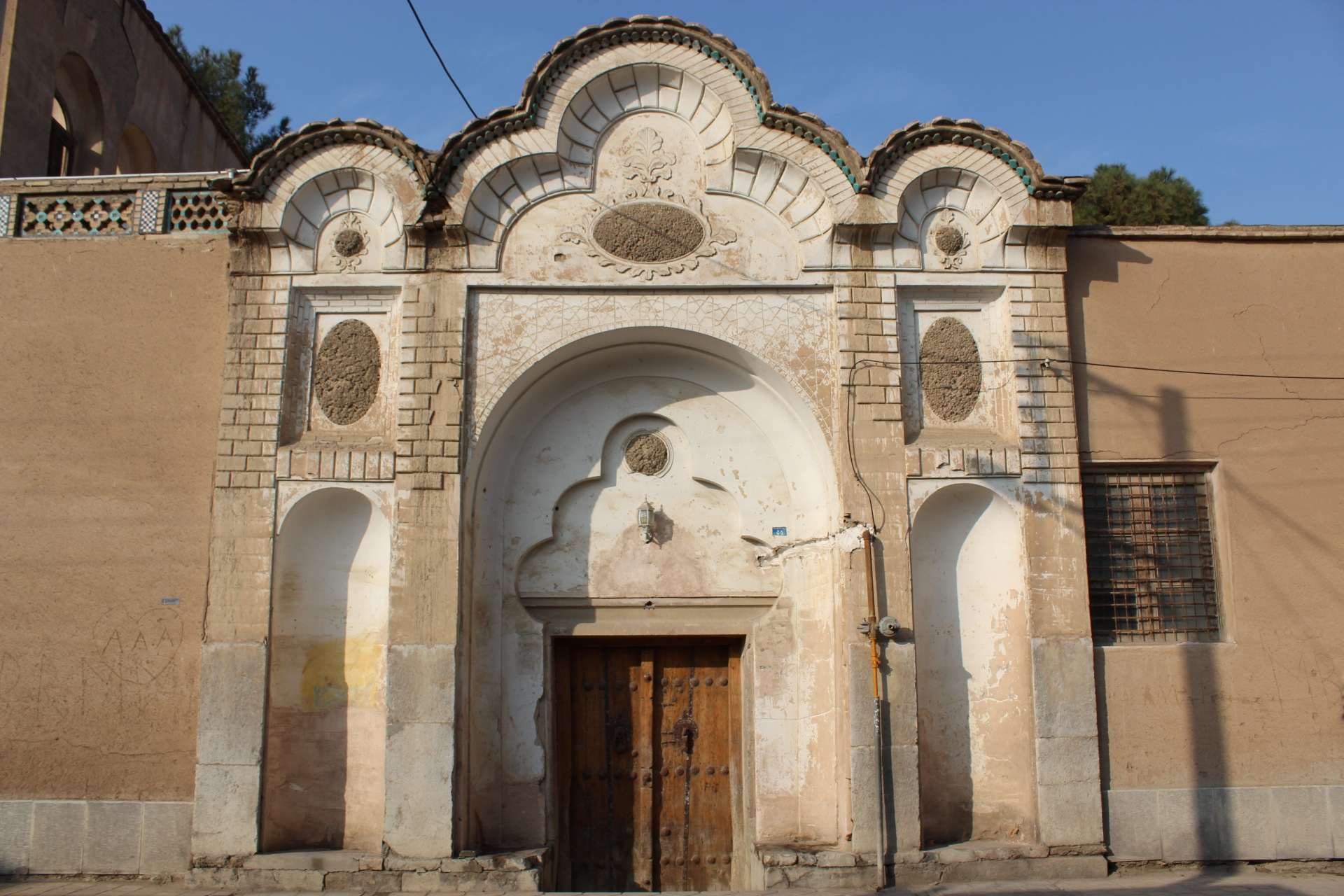
The southern gate

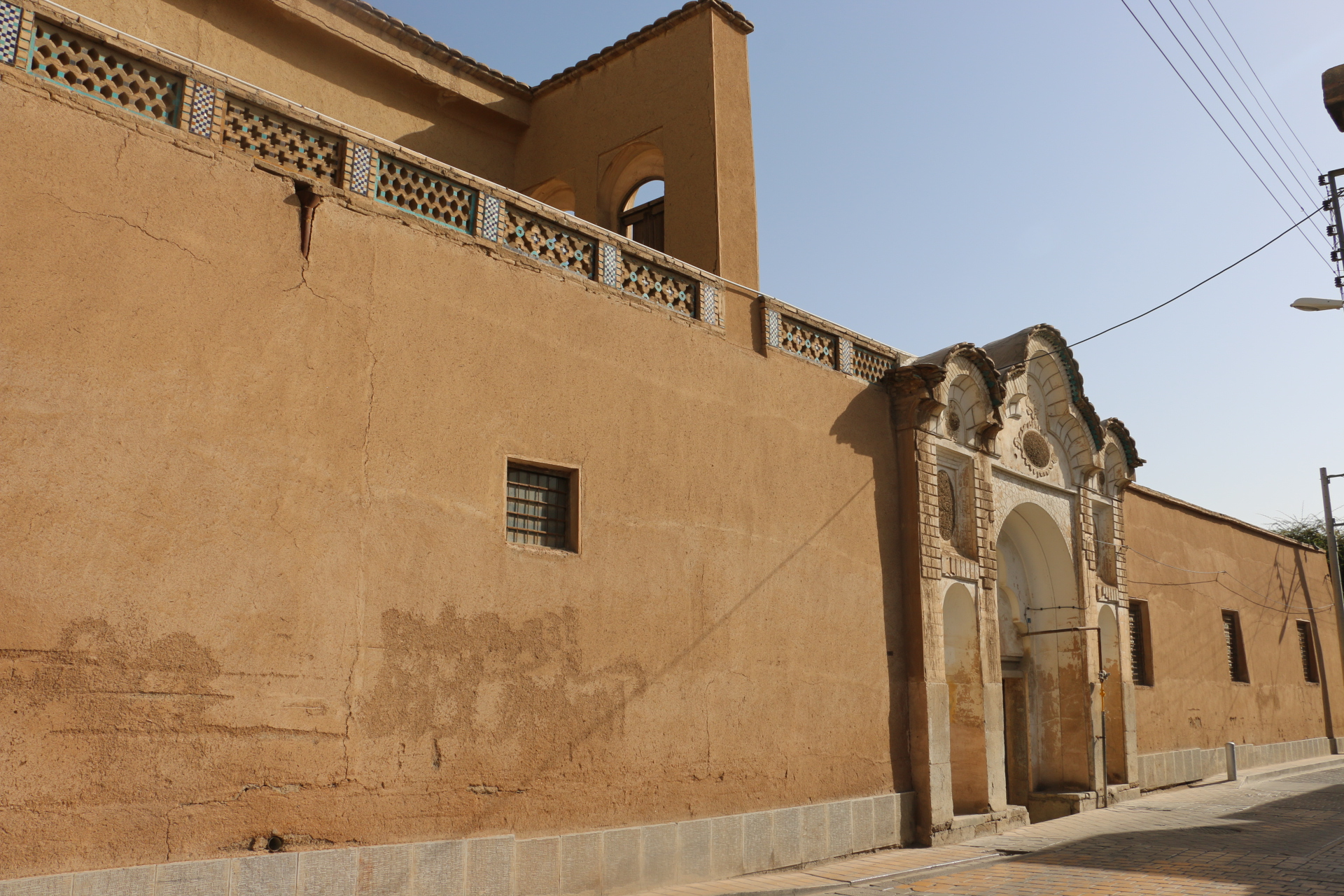

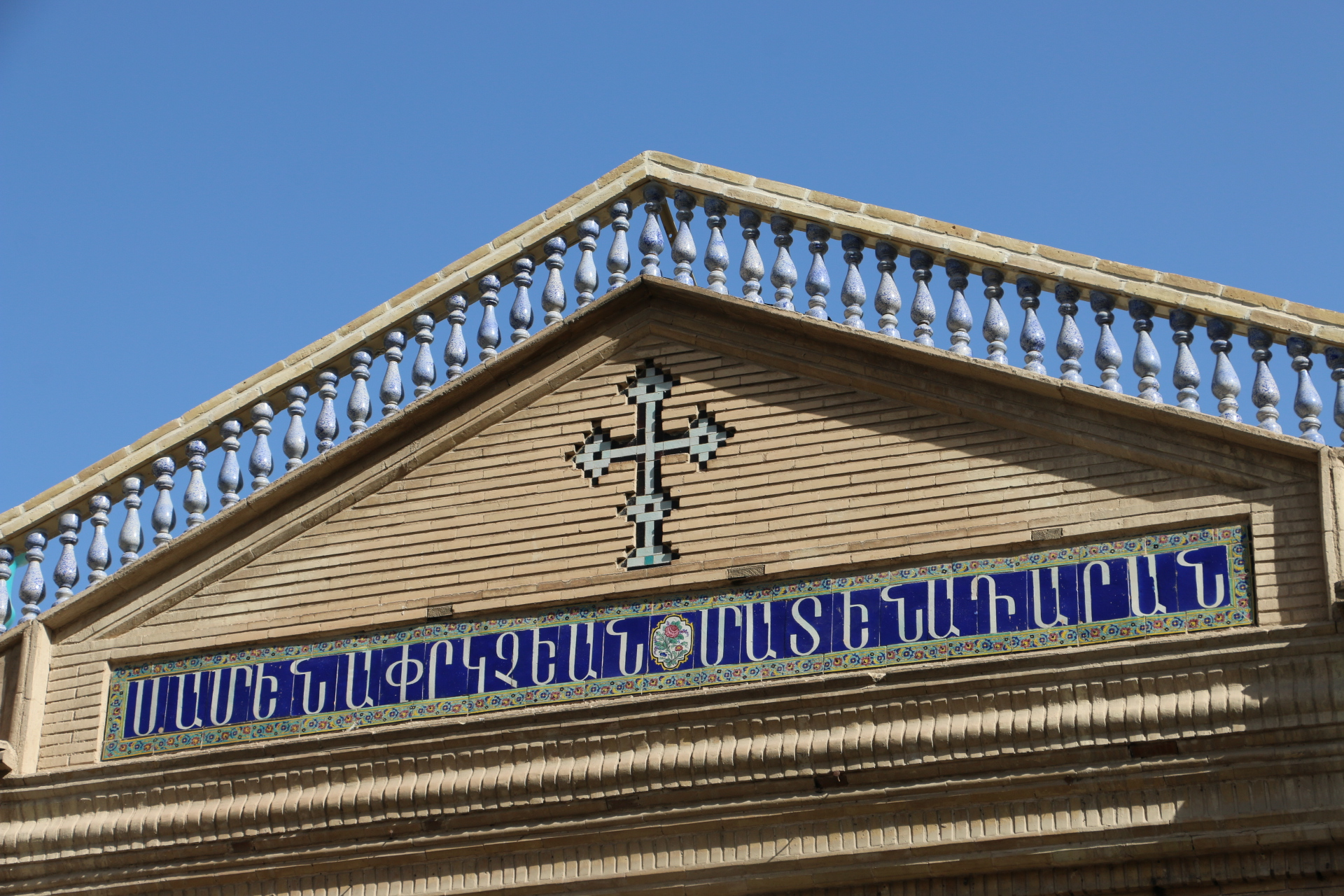
The cathedral library

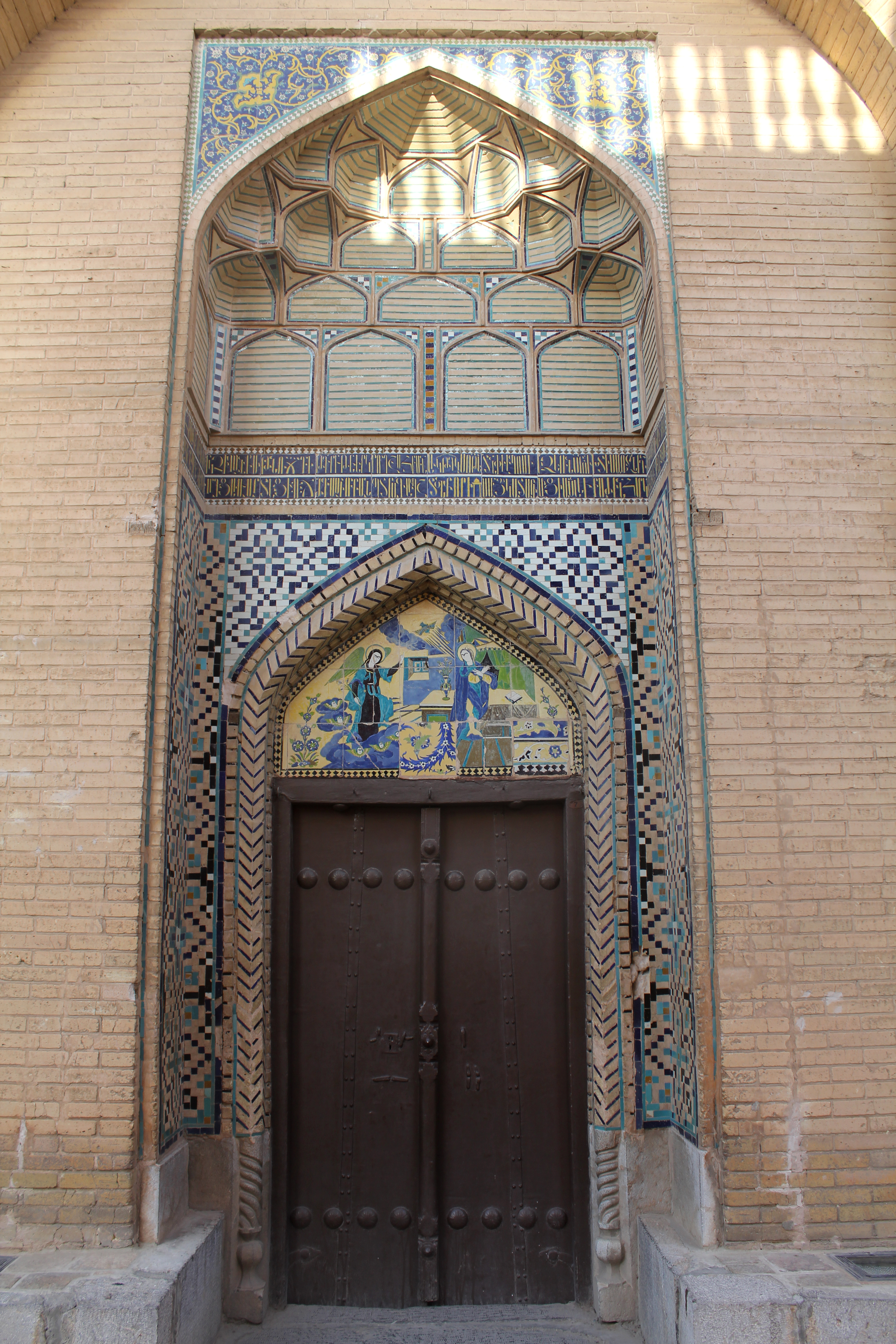
Cathedral Entrance

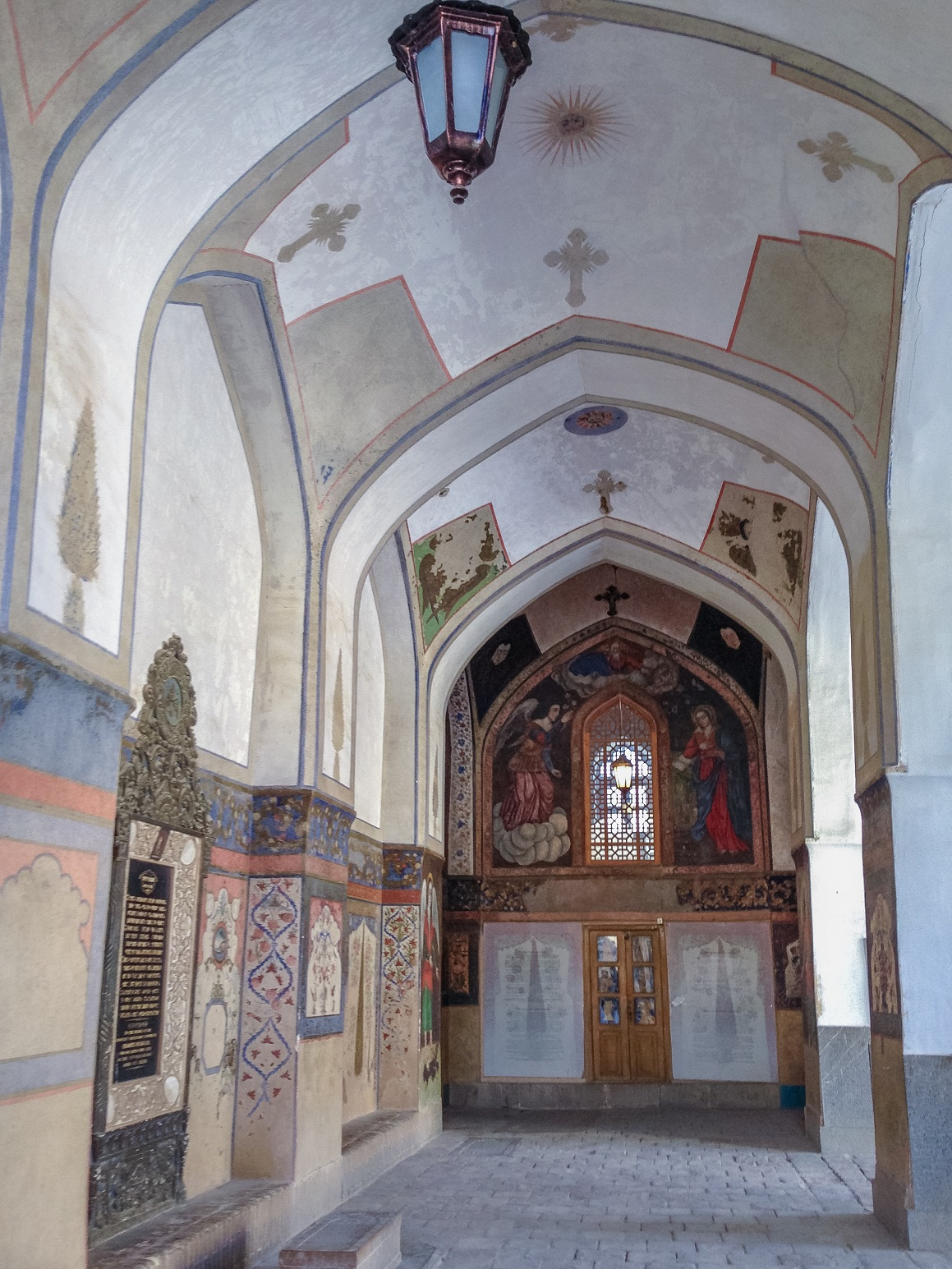
The corridor

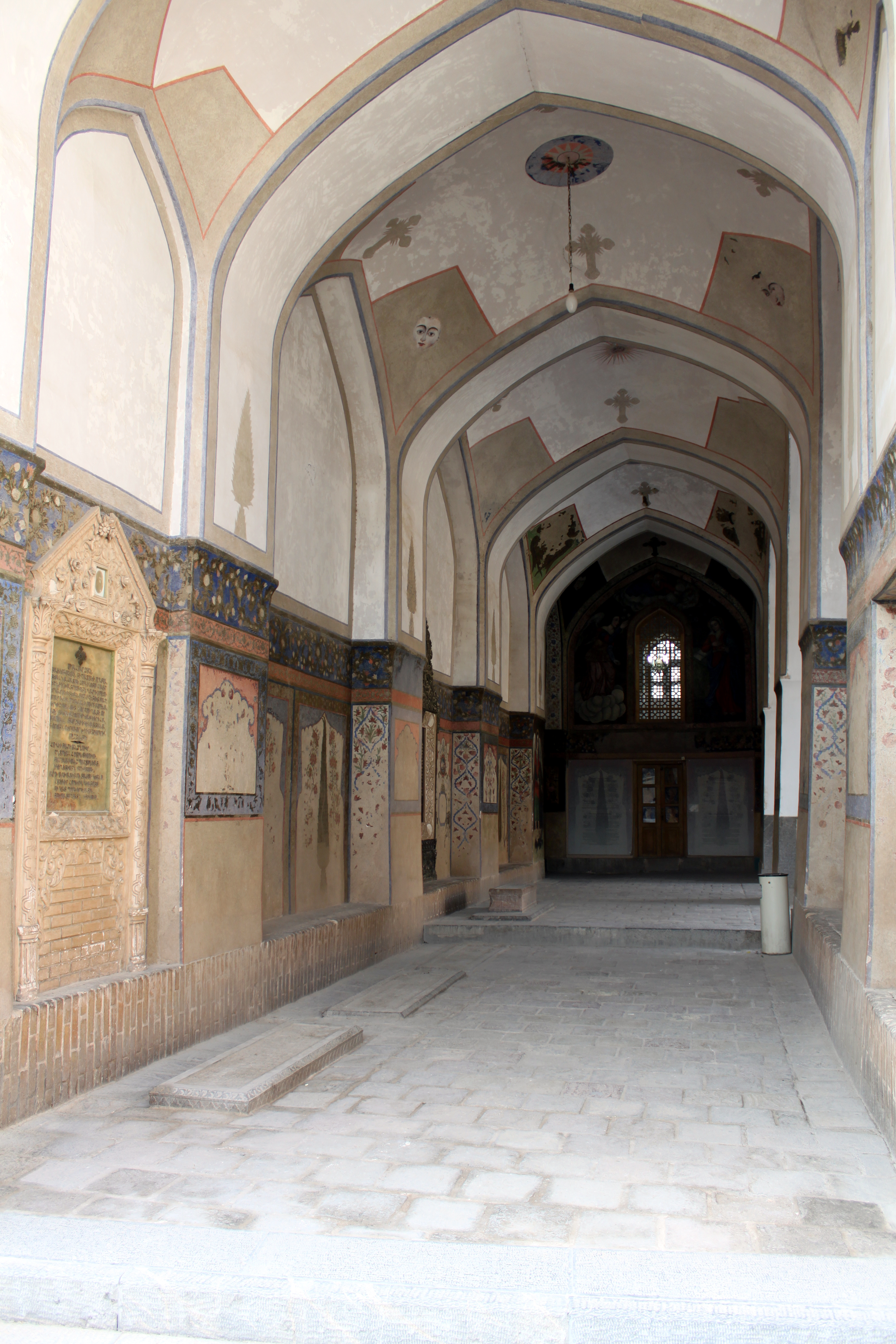

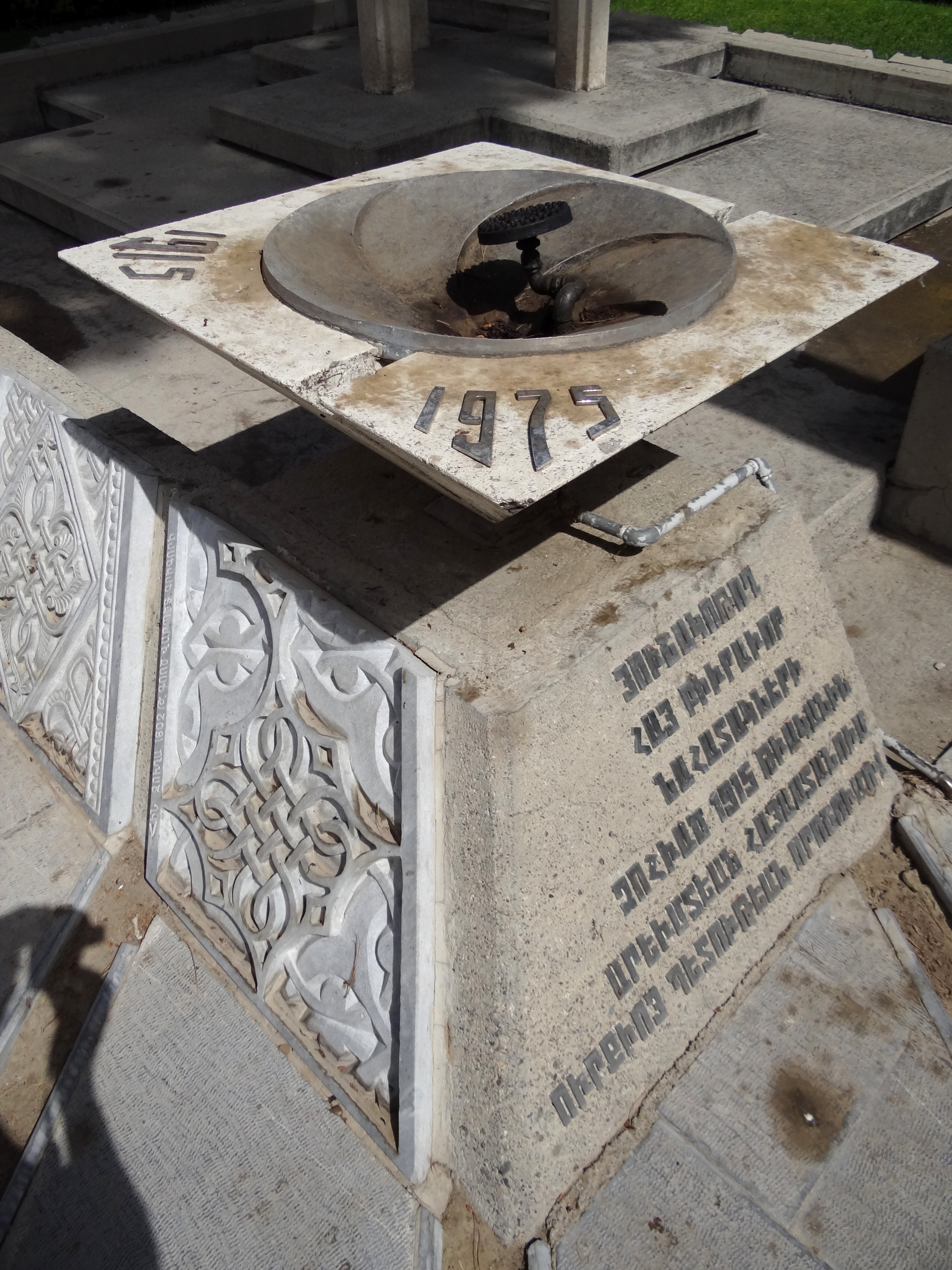
Armenian Genocide memorial

== Library and museum ==
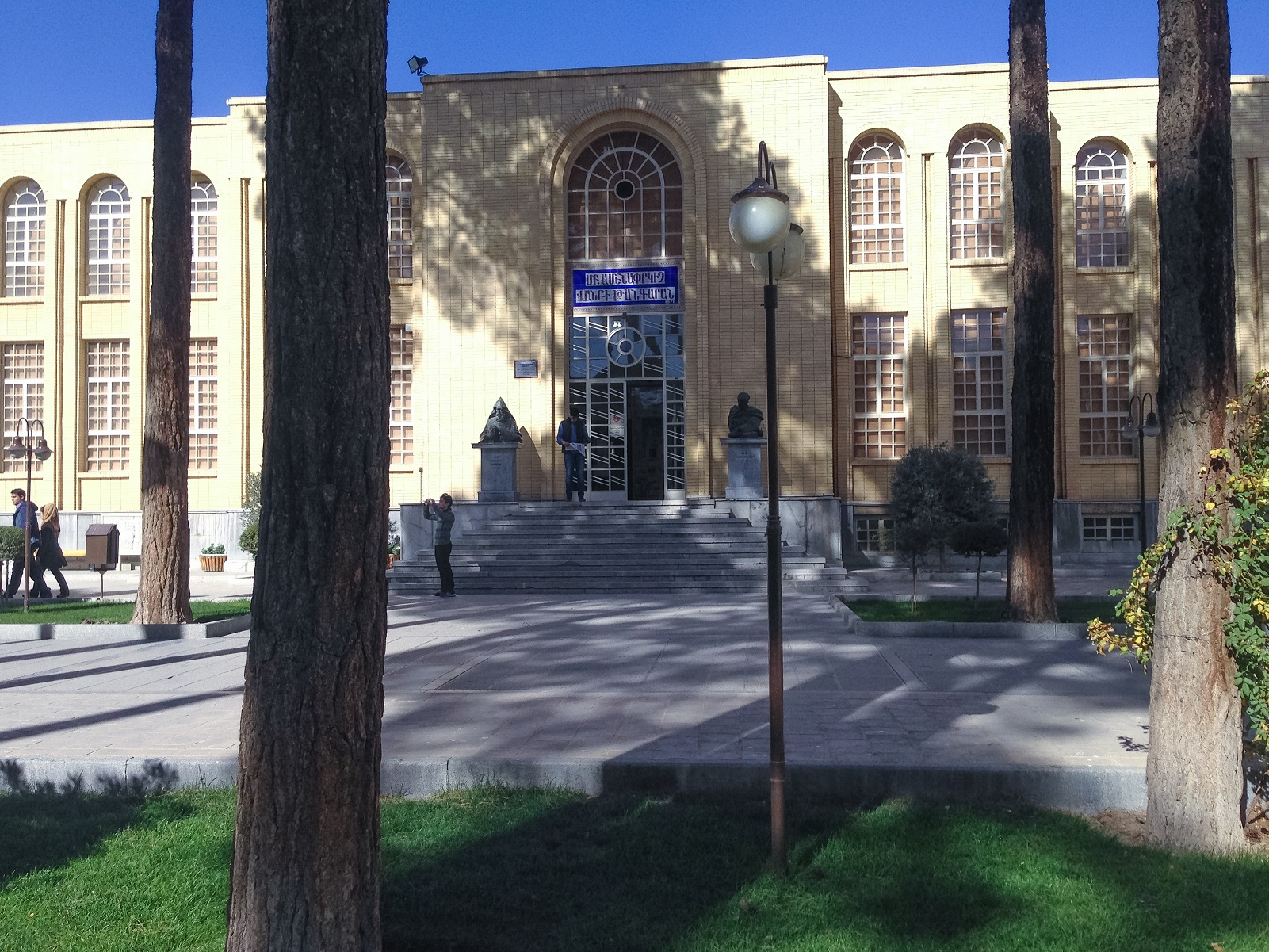
Museum of Khachatur Kesaratsi in front of the Holy Savior Cathedral

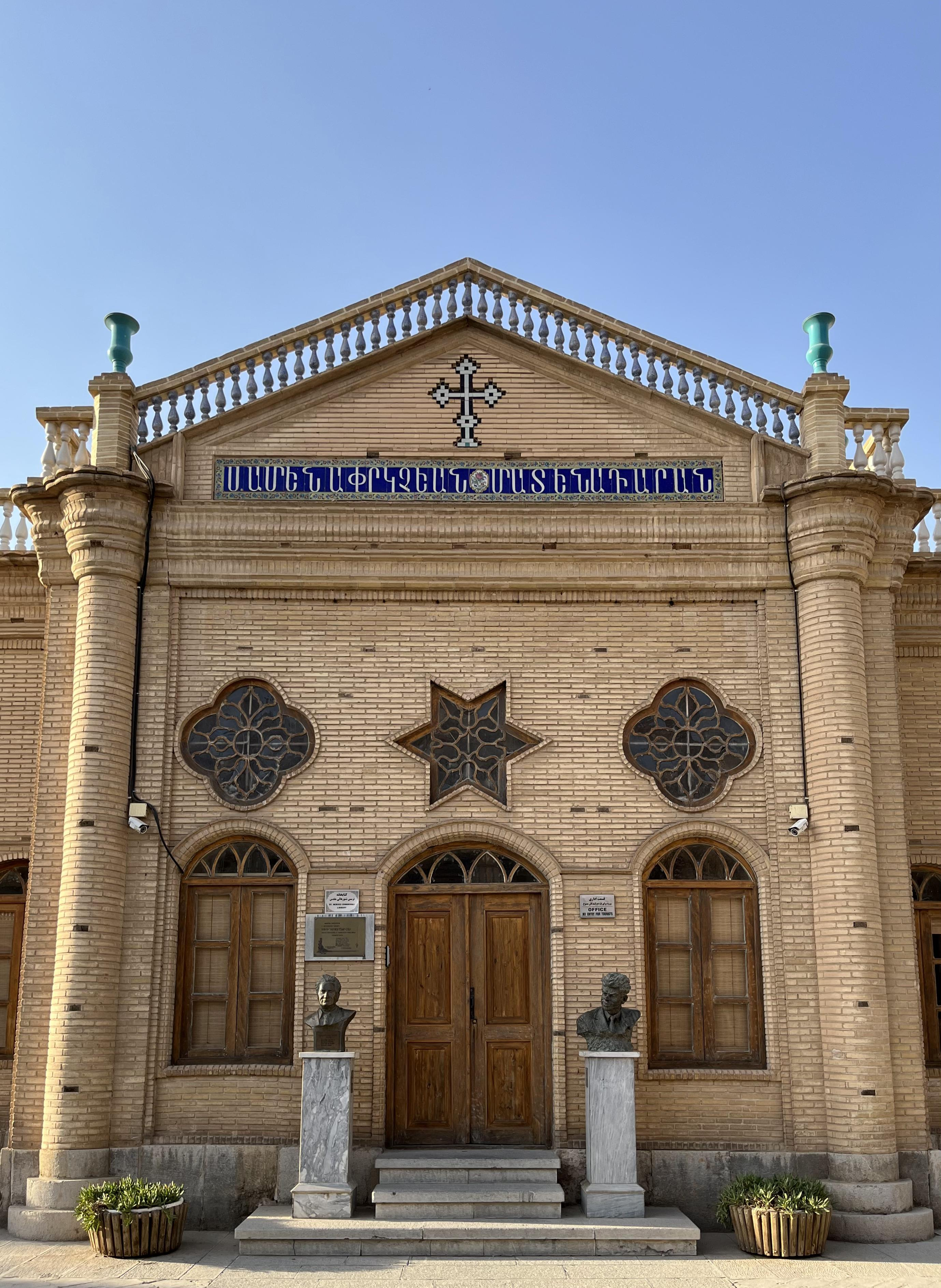
Cathedral library

The library contains over 700 handwritten books and many valuable and unique resources for research in Armenian and medieval European languages and arts. The museum displays numerous artifacts from the history of the cathedral and the Armenian community in Isfahan, including:

- the 1606 edict of Abbas the Great establishing New Julfa;
- several edicts by Abbas I and his successors condemning and prohibiting interference with, or persecution of, Armenians and their property and affairs;
- a historic printing press and the first book printed in Iran;
- vestments, monstrances, chalices, and other sacramental artifacts;
- Safavid costumes, tapestries, European paintings brought back by Armenian merchants, embroidery, and other treasures from the community's trading heritage;
- ethnological displays portraying aspects of Armenian culture and religion;
- an extensive display of photographs, maps, and Turkish documents (with translation) related to the 1915 Armenian genocide in Turkey.

The cathedral has greatly influenced the architecture and decorative treatment of many subsequent Orthodox churches in the region.

== See also ==
- New Julfa
- Fereydan
- Holy Saviour Monastery of Old Julfa
