= Religion in Iran =

Religion in Iran (ARDA 2025)
1. Shia Islam (80.3%)
2. Sunni Islam (16.9%)
3. Other Muslims (0.97%)
4. Christianity (0.99%)
5. No religion (0.36%)
6. Baháʼí (0.30%)
7. Other religions (0.18%)
Religion in Iran (GAMAAN July 2023 Online Social Media Survey)
1. Muslim (Note: Includes: Shi’a (37.9%), Sunni (4.9%), and Sufi (1.0%).) (43.8%)
2. Belief in God without religion (17.3%)
3. Humanist (16.1%)
4. Irreligious (Note: Includes: None (6.6%), Atheist (6.5%), and Agnostic (1.6%).) (14.7%)
5. Zoroastrian (2.80%)
6. Other (Note: Includes: Christian (0.5%), Baháʼí (0.2%), Jewish (0.1%), Yarsan (0.3%), Spiritual (1.6%), other religions (2.9%).) (5.30%)

Religion in Iran has been shaped by multiple religions and sects over the course of the country's history.

Zoroastrianism was the main followed religion during the Achaemenid Empire (550–330 BC), Parthian Empire (247 BC–224 AD), and Sasanian Empire (224–651 AD). Another Iranian religion known as Manichaeanism was present in Iran during this period. Jewish and Christian communities (the Church of the East) thrived, especially in the territories of northwestern, western, and southern Iran—mainly Caucasian Albania, Asoristan, Persian Armenia, and Caucasian Iberia. A significant number of Iranian people also adhered to Buddhism in what was then eastern Iran, such as the regions of Bactria and Sogdia.

Between 632–654 AD, the Rashidun Caliphate conquered Iran, and the next two centuries of Umayyad and Abbasid rule (as well as native Iranian rule during the Iranian Intermezzo) would see Iran, although initially resistant, gradually adopt Islam as the nation's predominant faith. Sunni Islam was the predominant form of Islam before the devastating Mongol conquest (1219–1221 AD), but with the advent of the Safavid Empire (1501–1736), Shia Islam became the predominant faith in Iran.

There have been a number of surveys on the current religious makeup of Iran. Those using telephone and face-to-face survey modes show a very high percentage of Iranian identifying as Muslim—99.38% in the 2011 Iranian census, and 96.6% in the World Values Survey in 2020. In 2020, the CIA World Factbook estimated that 98.5% of the population adhered to Islam. Of Iran's Muslim population, 90-95% are Shia and 5-10% are Sunni. The U.S. News & World Report placed Iran 3rd on the ranking of the most religious nations in 2024. A 2024 Gallup report conducted across multiple countries, including Iran, stated that in Iran, 72% of respondents said they were religious, 27% said they were not religious, and 1% said they were atheist.

Online surveys conducted by GAMAAN have reported a significantly lower percentage of Iranians adhering to Islam, with 40.4% in June 2020, 61% in February 2022, 43.5% in December 2022, and 43.8% in July 2023. The reliability of these surveys has been called into question, as they use self-selecting participants reached through social media and chain referrals.

In 2024, Iran was scored zero out of four for religious freedom by Freedom House. Christianity, Judaism and Zoroastrianism are officially recognized and protected, and have reserved seats in the Iranian parliament. Iran is home to the second largest Jewish community in the Muslim world and the Middle East. The three largest non-Muslim religious minorities in Iran are the followers of the Baháʼí Faith, Christianity and Yarsanism. Sometime after 1844, the Baháʼí community became the largest religious minority group in Iran; they have been persecuted throughout their existence and are not recognized as a faith by the Iranian government.

== History ==
=== Prehistory ===
The first known religions in Iran were the Elamite religions, and Indo-European religions such as Mithraism and Zoroastrianism developed from Indo-Iranian religion with slight mixture from the Elamite religion and surrounding cultures such as Assyrian, Babylonian, and Akkadian.

=== Zoroastrianism ===
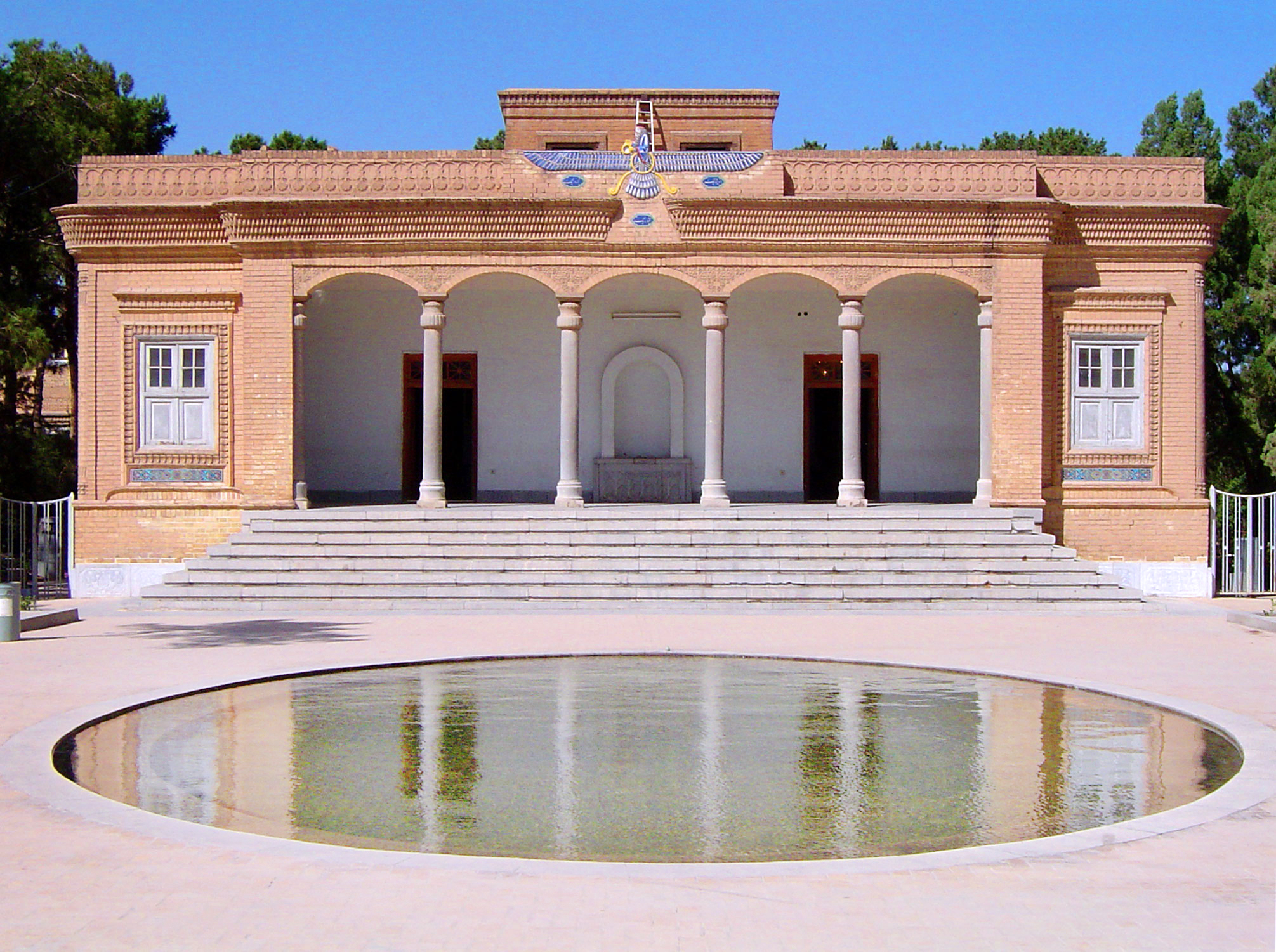
Zoroastrian Fire Temple in Yazd

The written Zoroastrian holy book, called the Avesta, dates back to between 600 and 1000 BC, but the traditions it is based on are more ancient. It was the predominant religion in the region until the Muslims conquered Iran.

Zoroastrians in Iran have had a long history reaching back thousands of years, and are the oldest religious community of Iran that has survived to the present day. Prior to the Muslim Arab invasion of Iran, Zoroastrianism had been the primary religion of Iranian peoples. Zoroastrians mainly are ethnic Persians and are concentrated in the cities of Tehran, Kerman, and Yazd. According to the Iranian census data from 2011 the number of Zoroastrians in Iran was 25,271. Reports in 2022 show a similar figure.

Oppression has led to a massive diaspora community across the world, in particular, the Parsis of India, whose numbers significantly higher than the Zoroastrians in Iran.

Mithra (Avestan: 𐬨𐬌𐬚𐬭𐬀 Miθra, Old Persian: 𐎷𐎰𐎼 Miça) is the Zoroastrian Divinity (yazata) of Covenant, Light, and Oath. In addition to being the divinity of contracts, Mithra is also a judicial figure, an all-seeing protector of Truth, and the guardian of cattle, the harvest, and of the Waters.

=== Manichaeism ===
Manichaeism was a major religion founded by the Iranian prophet Mani (Middle Persian Mānī, New Persian: مانی Mānī, Syriac Mānī, Greek Μάνης, c. 216–274 AD) in the Sasanian Empire but has been extinct for many centuries. It originated in third century Mesopotamia and spread rapidly throughout North Africa to Central Asia during the next several centuries.

Mani was a Babylonian prophet born in 216 C.E. near the city of Ctesiphon. Not long after his birth, Mani's father, Pattikios, heard a voice commanding him to join a communitarian sect that resided in the marshes south of the city and so he abandoned his former life and took his son with him. Mani grew up in the sect and occasionally experienced “revelations” meditated through an angelic figure. These revelations led to his increasingly disruptive behavior and he was eventually forced to leave the sect and start a new phase of his life.

Inspired by the messages he received from the angelic figure, Mani began his missionary journeys to spread his new religion. Gaining the favor of the Sasanian ruler in Mesopotamia was an important factor for the early success of his work. Over time, Mani built a following and a number of his trusted disciples were dispatched to the West to Syria, Arabia, and Egypt and added more converts to this rapidly expanding religion.

Manichaeism taught an elaborate dualistic cosmology describing the struggle between a good, spiritual world of light, and an evil, material world of darkness.

By the end of the third century Manichaeism reached the attention of the Roman Empire who viewed it as a “Persian aberration” with followers who were “despicable deviants”. Meanwhile, in Mesopotamia, rule was taken over by a new, less tolerant regime who imprisoned and executed Mani as an offender against Zoroastrian orthodoxy. As a result of consistent waves of persecution from Christians, Zoroastrians, and Muslims, Manichaeism was eventually eradicated as a formal religious affiliation within Byzantine and Islamicate realms.

=== Islam ===
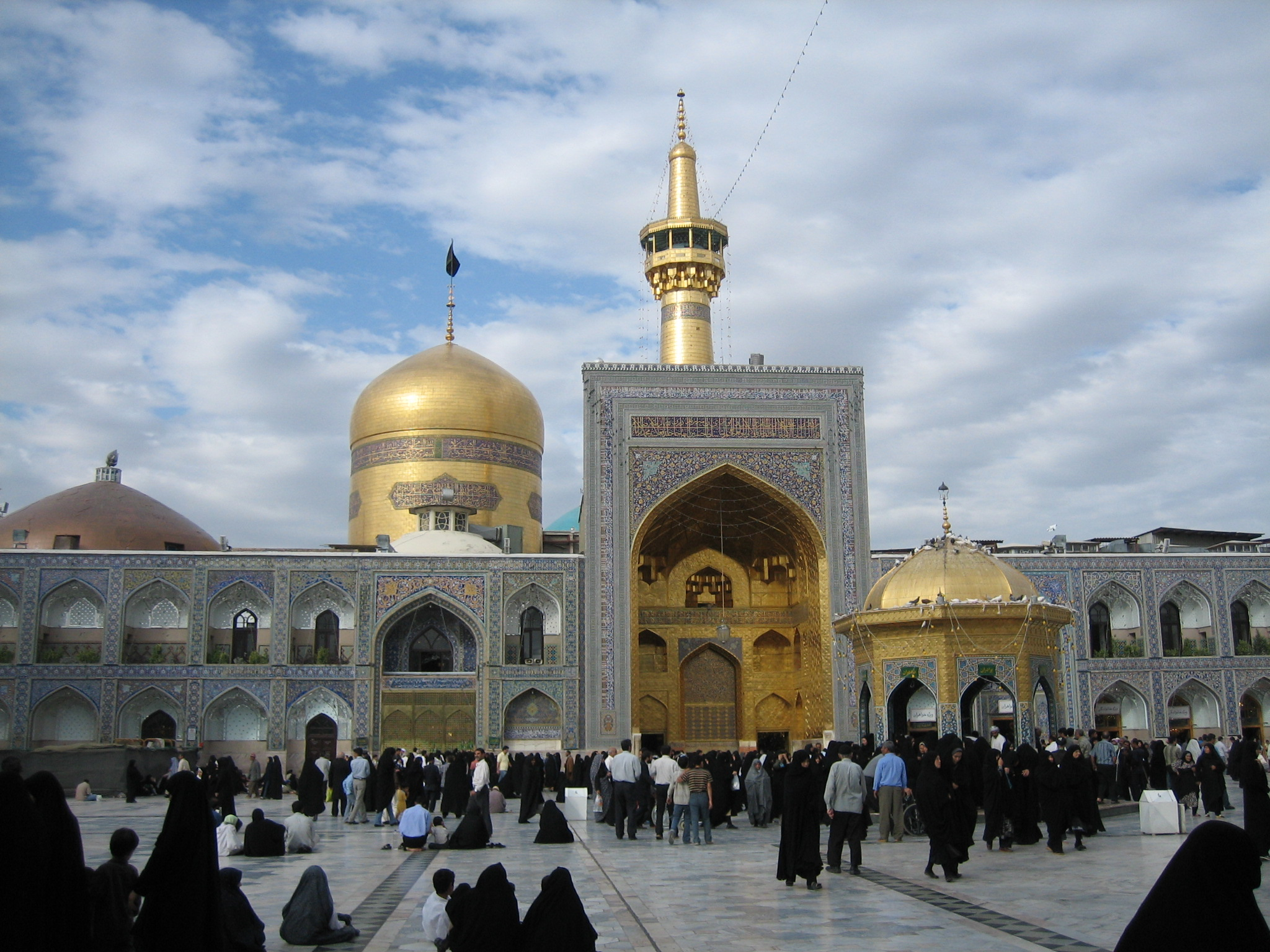
Imam Reza shrine, one of the most important religious places in Iran, Mashhad

Islam has been the official religion and part of the governments of Iran since the Arab conquest of Iran c. 640 AD. (Note: readers should know that specific regions would be ruled by various dynasties so many of the dynasties of Iran have overlapping dates as they co-existed in various neighboring regions as part of Iran.) It took another few hundred years for Shia Islam to gather and become a religious and political power in Iran. In the history of Shia Islam the first Shia state was Idrisid dynasty (780–974) in Maghreb, a region of Northwest Africa. Then the Alavids dynasty (864–928 AD) became established in Mazandaran (Tabaristan), in northern Iran. The Alavids were of the Zaidiyyah Shia (sometimes called "Fiver".) These dynasties were local. But they were followed by two great and powerful dynasties: Fatimid Caliphate which formed in Ifriqiya in 909 AD and the Buyid dynasty emerged in Daylaman, in north central Iran, about 930 AD and then extended rule over central and western Iran and into Iraq until 1048 AD. The Buyid were also Zaidiyyah Shia. Later Sunni Islam came to rule from the Ghaznavids dynasty (975–1187 AD) through to the Mongol invasion and establishment of the Ilkhanate which kept Shia Islam out of power until the Mongol ruler Ghazan converted to Shia Islam in 1310 AD.

The distinction between Shia groups have distinctions between Fiver, Sevener and Twelver, derived from their belief in how many divinely ordained leaders there were who are descendants of the Islamic prophet Muhammad through his daughter Fatimah and his son-in-law Ali. These Imams are considered the best source of knowledge about the Quran and Islam, the most trusted carriers and protectors of Muḥammad's Sunnah (habit or usual practice) and the most worthy of emulation. In addition to the lineage of Imams, Twelvers have their preferred hadith collections – The Four Books – which are narrations regarded by Muslims as important tools for understanding the Quran and in matters of jurisprudence. For Twelvers the lineage of Imams are known as the Twelve Imams. Of these Imams, only one is buried in Iran – at the Imam Reza shrine, for Ali ar-Ridha who lived from 765 to 818 AD, before any Shi'a dynasties arose in Iran. The last Imam recognized by Twelvers, Muhammad al-Mahdi, was born in 868 AD as the Alavids spread their rule in Iran while in conflict with Al-Mu'tamid, the Abbasid Caliph at the time. Several Imams are buried in Iraq, as sites of pilgrimage, and the rest are in Saudi Arabia. In addition two of the Five Martyrs of Shia Islam have connections to Iran – Shahid Thani (1506–1558) lived in Iran later in life, and Qazi Nurullah Shustari (1549–1610) was born in Iran. The predominant school of theology, practice, and jurisprudence (Madh'hab) in Shia Islam is Jafari established by Ja'far as-Sadiq. There is also a community of Nizari Ismailis in Iran who recognise Aga Khan IV as their Imam.

Although Shias have lived in Iran since the earliest days of Islam, and there had been Shia dynasties in parts of Iran during the 10th and 11th centuries, according to Mortaza Motahhari the majority of Iranian scholars and masses remained Sunni until the time of the Safavids.

However, there are four high points in the history of Shia in Iran that expanded this linkage:

- First, the migration of a number of persons belonging to the tribe of the Ash'ari from Iraq to the city of Qum towards the end of the 7th century AD, which is the period of establishment of Imami Shi‘ism in Iran.
- Second, the influence of the Shia tradition of Baghdad and Najaf on Iran during the 11th to 12th centuries AD.
- Third, the influence of the school of Hillah on Iran during the 14th century AD.
- Fourth, the influence of the Shi‘ism of Jabal Amel and Bahrain on Iran during the period of establishment of the Safavid rule.

In 1501, the Safavid dynasty established Twelver Shia Islam as the official state religion of Iran. In particular after Ismail I captured Tabriz in 1501 and established the Safavid dynasty, he proclaimed Twelver Shiʿism as the state religion, ordering conversion of the Sunnis. The population of what is nowadays Azerbaijan was converted to Shiism the same time as the people of what is nowadays Iran. Although conversion was not as rapid as Ismail's forcible policies might suggest, the vast majority of those who lived in the territory of what is now Iran and Azerbaijan did identify with Shiism by the end of the Safavid era in 1722. As most of Ismail's subjects were Sunni he enforced official Shi'ism violently, putting to death those who opposed him. Thousands were killed in subsequent purges.In some cases entire towns were eliminated because they were not willing to convert from Sunni Islam to Shia Islam. Ismail brought Arab Shia clerics from Bahrain, Iraq, Syria, and Lebanon in order to preach the Shia faith. Ismail's attempt to spread Shia propaganda among the Turkmen tribes of eastern Anatolia prompted a conflict with the Sunnite Ottoman Empire. Following Iran's defeat by the Ottomans at the Battle of Chaldiran, Safavid expansion faltered, and a process of consolidation began in which Ismail sought to quell the more extreme expressions of faith among his followers. While Ismail I declared Shiism as the official state religion, it was, in fact, his successor Tahmasb who consolidated the Safavid rule and spread Shiʿism in Iran. After a period of indulgence in wine and the pleasures of the harem, he turned pious and parsimonious, observing all the Shiʿite rites and enforcing them as far as possible on his entourage and subjects. Under Abbas I, Iran prospered. Succeeding Safavid rulers promoted Shi'a Islam among the elites, and it was only under Mullah Muhammad Baqir Majlisi – court cleric from 1680 until 1698 – that Shia Islam truly took hold among the masses.

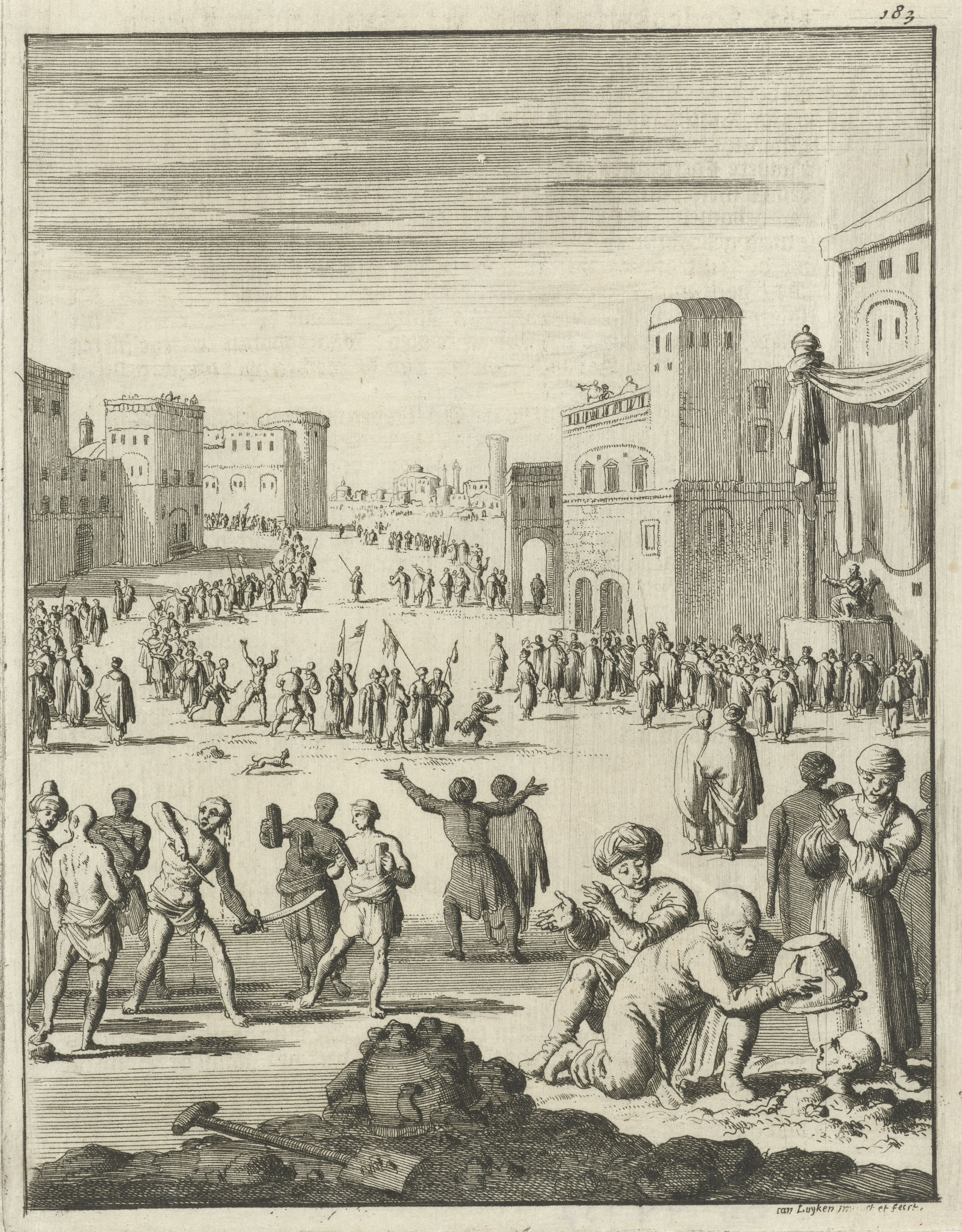
Mourning of Muharram rituals in Persia, dated 1682

Then there were successive dynasties in Iran – the Afsharid dynasty (1736–1796 AD) (which mixed Shi'a and Sunni), Zand dynasty (1750–1794 AD) (which was Twelver Shia Islam), the Qajar dynasty (1794–1925 AD) (again Twelver). There was a brief Iranian Constitutional Revolution in 1905–11 in which the progressive religious and liberal forces rebelled against theocratic rulers in government who were also associated with European colonialization and their interests in the new Anglo-Persian Oil Company.The secularist efforts ultimately succeeded in the Pahlavi dynasty (1925–1979 AD). The 1953 Iranian coup d'état was orchestrated by Western powers which created a backlash against Western powers in Iran, and was among the background and causes of the Iranian Revolution to the creation of the Islamic republic.

From the Islamization of Iran the cultural and religious expression of Iran participated in the Islamic Golden Age from the 9th through the 13th centuries AD, for 400 years. This period was across Shia and Sunni dynasties through to the Mongol governance. Iran participated with its own scientists and scholars. Additionally the most important scholars of almost all of the Islamic sects and schools of thought were Persian or lived in Iran including most notable and reliable Hadith collectors of Shia and Sunni like Shaikh Saduq, Shaikh Kulainy, Muhammad al-Bukhari, Muslim ibn al-Hajjaj and Hakim al-Nishaburi, the greatest theologians of Shia and Sunni like Shaykh Tusi, Al-Ghazali, Fakhr al-Din al-Razi and Al-Zamakhshari, the greatest Islamic physicians, astronomers, logicians, mathematicians, metaphysicians, philosophers and scientists like Al-Farabi and Nasir al-Din al-Tusi, the Shaykhs of Sufism like Rumi, Abdul-Qadir Gilani – all these were in Iran or from Iran. And there were poets like Hafiz who wrote extensively in religious themes. Ibn Sina, known as Avicenna in the west, was a polymath and the foremost Islamic physician and philosopher of his time. Hafiz was the most celebrated Persian lyric poet and is often described as a poet's poet. Rumi's importance transcends national and ethnic borders even today. Readers of the Persian and Turkish language in Iran, Azerbaijan, Turkey, Afghanistan, Tajikistan and Uzbekistan see him as one of their most significant classical poets and an influence on many poets through history. In addition to individuals, whole institutions arose – Nizamiyyas were the medieval institutions of Islamic higher education established by Nizam al-Mulk in the 11th century. These were the first well-organized universities in the Muslim world. The most famous and celebrated of all the Nizamiyyas was the Nizamiyya of Baghdad (established 1065), where Nizam al-Mulk appointed the distinguished philosopher and theologian, al-Ghazali, as a professor. Other Nizamiyyas were located in Nishapur, Balkh, Herat, and Isfahan.

While the dynasties avowed either Shia or Sunni, and institutions and individuals claimed either Sunni or Shia affiliations, Shia–Sunni relations were part of Islam in Iran and continue today when Ayatollah Khomeini also called for unity between Sunni and Shia Muslims.

==== Sunni Islam ====
Sunni Muslims are the second-largest religious group in Iran. Specifically, Sunni Muslims came to power in Iran after the period when Sunni were distinguished from Shi'a by the Ghaznavids who ruled Iran from 975 to 1186 AD, followed by the rule of the Great Seljuq Empire and the Khwarazm-Shah dynasty which ruled Iran until the Mongol invasion of Iran. Sunni Muslims returned to power when Ghazan converted to Sunni Islam.

About 9% of the Iranian population are Sunni Muslims—mostly Larestani people (Khodmooni) from Larestan, Kurds in the northwest, Arabs and Balochs in the southwest and southeast, and a smaller number of Persians, Pashtuns and Turkmens in the northeast.

Sunni websites and organizations complain about the absence of any official records regarding their community and believe their number is much greater than what is usually estimated. Demographic changes have become an issue for both sides. Scholars on either side speak about the increase in the Sunni population and usually issue predictions regarding demographic changes in the country. One prediction, for example, claims that the Sunnis will be the majority in Iran by 2030.

The mountainous region of Larestan is mostly inhabited by indigenous Sunni Persians who did not convert to Shia Islam during the Safavids because the mountainous region of Larestan was too isolated. The majority of Larestani people are Sunni Muslims, 30% of Larestani people are Shia Muslims. The people of Larestan speak the Lari language, which is a southwestern Iranian language closely related to Old Persian (pre-Islamic Persian) and Luri. Sunni Larestani Iranians migrated to the Arab states of the Persian Gulf in large numbers in the late 19th century. Some Sunni Emirati, Bahraini and Kuwaiti citizens are of Larestani ancestry.

Iran's Ministry of Health announced that all family-planning programs and procedures would be suspended. Supreme Leader Ayatollah Ali Khamenei called on women to have more children to boost the country's population to 150–200 million. Contraceptive policy made sense 20 years ago, he said, but its continuation in later years was wrong. Numerous speculations have been given for this change in policy: that it was an attempt to show the world that Iran is not suffering from sanctions; to avoid an aging population with rising medical and social-security costs; or to return to Iran's genuine culture. Some speculate that the new policy seeks to address the Supreme Leader's concerns that Iran's Sunni population is growing much faster than its Shia one (7% growth in Sunni areas compared to 1–1.3% in Shia areas).

The predominant school of theology and jurisprudence (Madh'hab) among Sunnis in Iran is Hanafi, established by Abu Hanifa.

According to Mehdi Khalaji, Salafi Islamic thoughts have been on the rise in Iran in recent years. Salafism alongside extremist Ghulat Shia sects has become popular amongst some Iranian youth, who connect through social media and underground organizations. The Iranian government views Salafism as a threat and does not allow Salafis to build mosques in Tehran or other large cities due to the fear that these mosques could be infiltrated by extremists.

It is reported that members of religious minority groups, especially Sunni Muslims who supported rebels during the Syrian Civil War, are increasingly persecuted by authorities. During 2022, there were several reports of government harassment, discrimination and detention of citizens because of their religious beliefs.

In 2022, Mehdi Farmanian, chancellor for research at the Qom-based University of Religions and Denominations, claimed that Sunnis enjoy religious freedoms in Iran by indicating that they possess 15000 mosques, 500 religious schools and 100 religious institutions, but critical observers note that Sunnis still aren't treated as equal citizens, for instance not getting the same amount of budget or the fact that their numbers are under-estimated, Baloch Sunni cleric and leader Abdolhamid Ismaeelzahi putting them at 20% of the population (instead of the official 10%).

==== Sufism ====
The Safaviya sufi order, originates during the Safavid dynasty c. 700 AD. A later order in Persia is the Chishti. The Nimatullahi are the largest Shi'i Sufi order active throughout Iran and there is the Naqshbandi, a Sunni order active mostly in the Kurdish regions of Iran. The Oveyssi-Shahmaghsoudi order is the largest Iranian Sufi order which currently operates outside of Iran.

Since the 1979 Revolution, Sufi practices have been repressed by the Islamic Republic, forcing some Sufi leaders into exile.

While no official statistics are available for Sufi groups, there are reports that estimate their population between two and five million (between 3–7% of the population).

=== Christianity ===
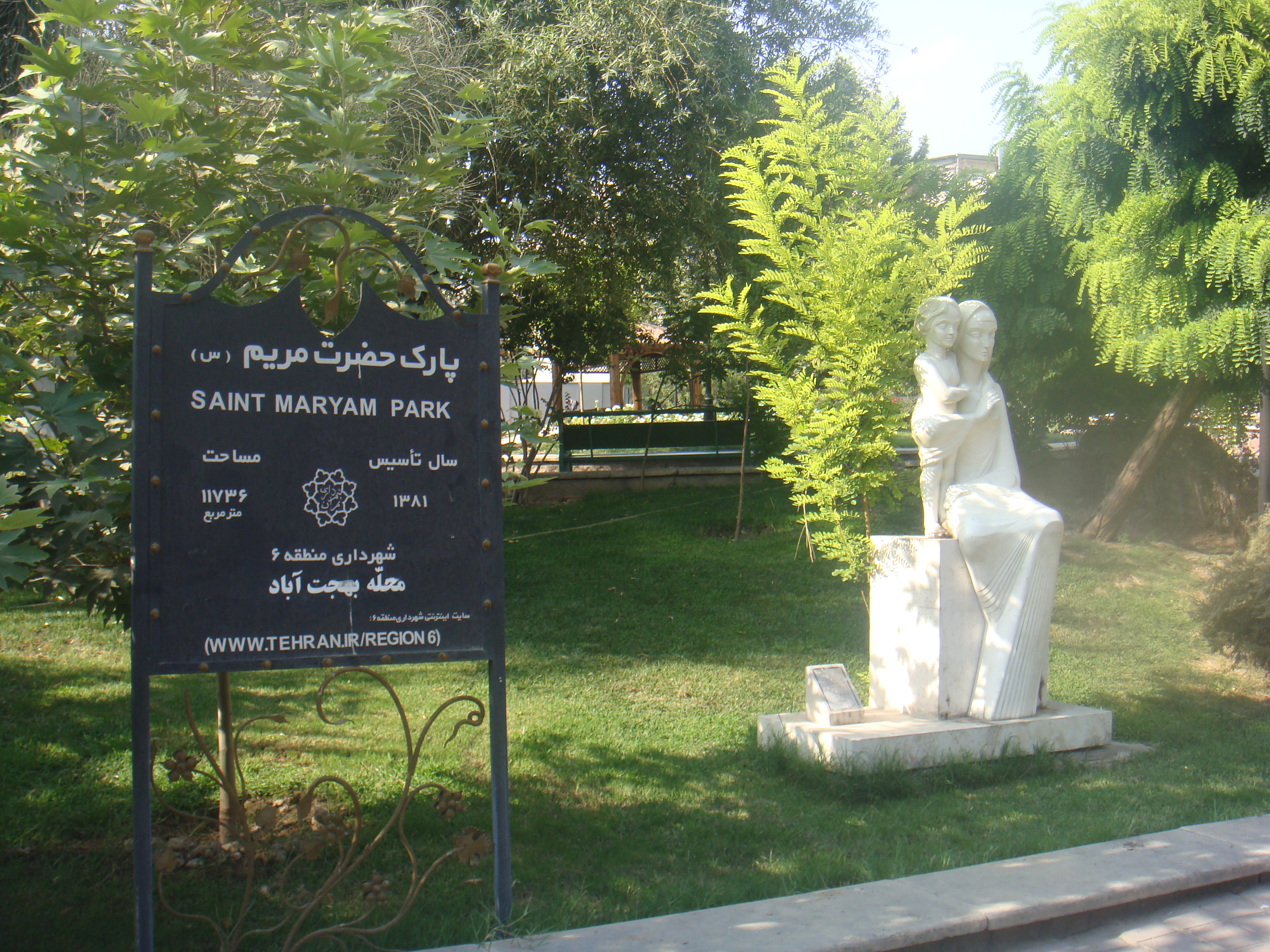
Saint Mary Park in Tehran (2011)

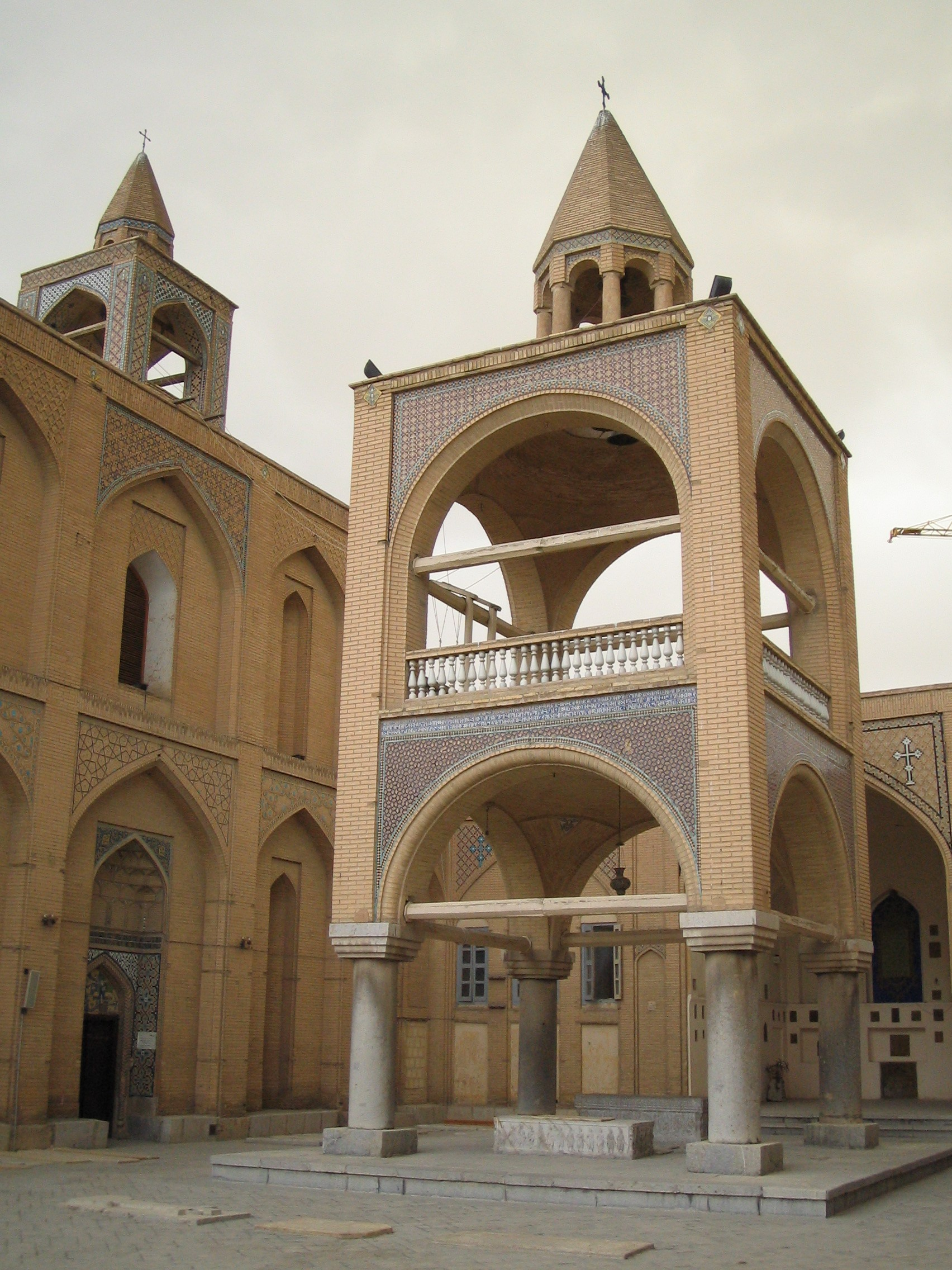
The Armenian Orthodox Vank cathedral of Isfahan is a relic of the Safavid era.

Christianity has a long history in Iran, dating back to the very early years of the faith. There are some very old churches in Iran – perhaps the oldest and largest is the Monastery of Saint Thaddeus, which is also called the Ghara Kelissa (the Black Monastery), south of Maku. By far the largest group of Christians in Iran are Armenians under the Armenian Apostolic Church which has between 110,000, 250,000, and 300,000 adherents. There are many hundreds of Christian churches in Iran, with at least 600 being active serving the nation's Christian population. As of early 2015, the Armenian church is organized under Archbishop Sepuh Sargsyan, who succeeded Archbishop Manukian, who was the Armenian Apostolic Archbishop since at least the 1980s. Unofficial estimates for the Assyrian Christian population range between 20,000, and 70,000. Christian groups outside the country estimate the size of the Protestant Christian community to be fewer than 10,000, although many may practice in secret. There are approximately 20,000 Christians Iranian citizens abroad who left after the 1979 revolution. Christianity has always been a minority religion, overshadowed by the majority state religions—Zoroastrianism in the past, and Shia Islam today. Christians of Iran have played a significant part in the history of Christian mission. While always a minority the Armenian Christians have had an autonomy of educational institutions such as the use of their language in schools. The Government regards the Mandaeans as Christians, and they are included among the three recognized religious minorities; however, Mandaeans do not consider themselves Christians.

Christian population estimations range between 300,000 and 370,000 adherents; one estimate suggests a range between 100,000 and 500,000 Christian believers from a Muslim background living in Iran. Of the three non-Muslim religions recognized by the Iranian government, the 2011 General Census indicated that Christianity was the largest in the nation.

The small evangelical Protestant Christian minority in Iran has been subject to Islamic "government suspicion and hostility" according to Human Rights Watch at least in part because of its "readiness to accept and even seek out Muslim converts." According to Human Rights Watch in the 1990s, two Muslim converts to Christianity who had become ministers were sentenced to death for apostasy and other charges. There still have not been any reported executions of apostates. However many people, such as Youcef Nadarkhani, Saeed Abedini have been recently harassed, jailed and sentenced to death for apostasy. Iran is number nine on Open Doors’ 2022 World Watch List, an annual ranking of the 50 countries where Christians face the most extreme persecution.

=== Mandaeism ===
Mandaeism, sometimes also known as Sabianism (after the mysterious Sabians mentioned in the Quran, a name historically claimed by several religious groups), is a Gnostic, monotheistic and ethnic religion, whose adherents, the Mandaeans, follow John the Baptist also known as Yaḥyā ibn Zakarīyā. The number of Iranian Mandaeans is a matter of dispute. In 2009, there were an estimated 5,000 to 10,000 Mandaeans in Iran, according to the Associated Press, while Alarabiya has put the number of Iranian Mandaeans as high as 60,000 in 2011.

Until the Iranian Revolution, Mandaeans had mainly been concentrated in Khuzestan province, where the community historically existed side by side with the local Arab population. They had mainly practiced the profession of goldsmith, passing it from generation to generation. After the fall of the shah, its members faced increased religious discrimination, and many sought new homes in Europe and the Americas.

In 2002 the US State Department granted Iranian Mandaeans protective refugee status; since then roughly 1,000 have emigrated to the US, now residing in cities such as San Antonio, Texas. Iraq was the home of a bigger Mandaean community, which once was 70,000 strong.

=== Yarsanism ===
The Yarsan or Ahl-e Haqq is a syncretic religion founded by Sultan Sahak in the late 14th century in western Iran. It is difficult to find the accurate number of Yarsanis in Iran as they are not recognized by the Government, but the Encyclopedia of the Modern Middle East and North Africa estimates their total number at 1,000,000 in 2004, and "human rights organizations and news outlets" at between one and three million according to the US Department of State in 2022. They are mostly ethnic Goran Kurds, and primarily found in western Iran and Iraq, though there are also smaller groups of Persian, Lori, Azeri and Arab adherents. The Islamic Republican government often "considers" Yarsanis to be "Shia Muslims practicing Sufism", but Yarsanis believe their faith is distinct, calling it Yarsan, Ahl–e–Haq or Kakai. Because only citizens registered in one of the IRIs approved religions may obtain government services, Yarsanis often register as Shia.

=== Judaism ===
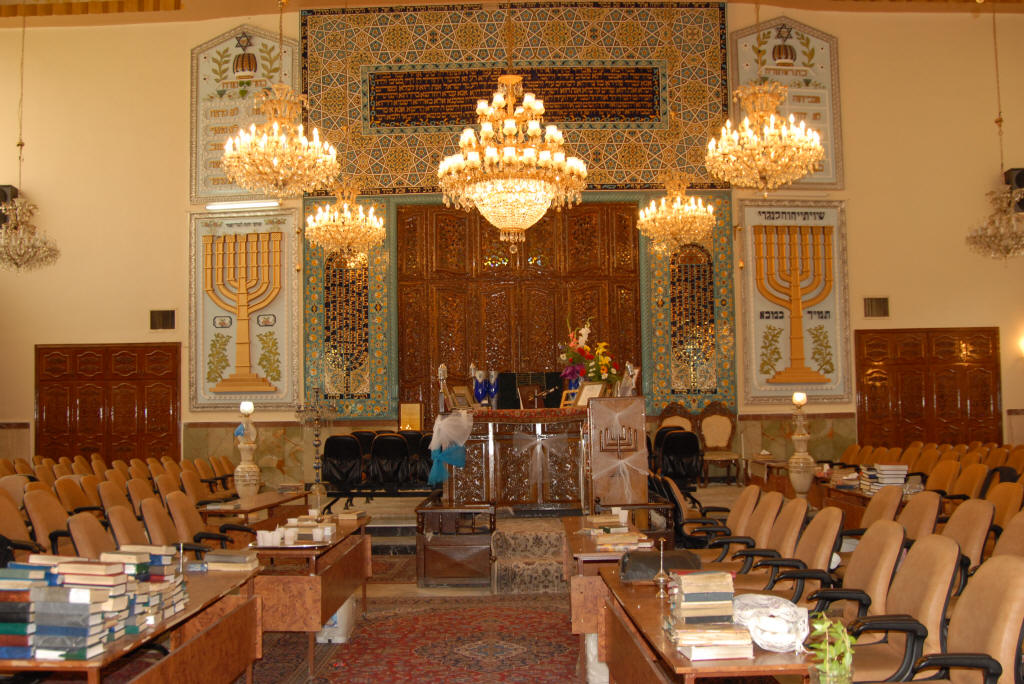
Yusef Abad synagogue in Tehran

Judaism is one of the oldest religions practiced in Iran and dates back to the late biblical times. The biblical books of Isaiah, Daniel, Ezra, Nehemiah, Chronicles, and Esther contain references to the life and experiences of Jews in Persia.

Iran is said to support by far the largest Jewish population of any Muslim country, although the Jewish communities in Turkey and Azerbaijan are of comparable size. In recent decades, the Jewish population of Iran has been reported by some sources to be 25,000, though estimates vary, as low as 11,000 and as high as 40,000. According to the Iranian census data from 2011 the number of Jews in Iran was 8,756, much lower than the figure previously estimated.

It is reported that Iran’s Jewish community is the largest in the Mideast outside Israel – and feels safe and respected. “We feel We have all the facilities we need for our rituals, and we can say our prayers very freely. We never have any problems. I can even tell you that, in many cases, we are more respected than Muslims,” said Nejat Golshirazi, 60, rabbi of the synagogue USA TODAY visited. "

Emigration has lowered the population of 75,000 to 80,000 Jews living in Iran prior to the 1979 Islamic revolution. According to The World Jewish Library, most Jews in Iran live in Tehran, Isfahan (3,000), and Shiraz. BBC reported Yazd is home to ten Jewish families, six of them related by marriage; however, some estimate the number is much higher. Historically, Jews maintained a presence in many more Iranian cities.

Today, the largest groups of Jews from Iran are found in the United States, which is home to approximately 100,000 Iranian Jews, who have settled especially in the Los Angeles area and New York City area. Israel is home to 75,000 Iranian Jews, including second-generation Israelis.

=== Baháʼí Faith ===
The Baháʼí Faith originated in Iran during the 1840s as a messianic movement out of Shia Islam. Opposition arose quickly, and Amir Kabir, as prime-minister, regarded the Bábis as a threat and ordered the execution of the founder of the movement, the Báb and killing of as many as 2,000 to 3,000 Babis. As another example two prominent Baháʼís were arrested and executed circa 1880 because the Imám-Jum'ih at the time owed them a large sum of money for business relations and instead of paying them he confiscated their property and brought public ridicule upon them as being Baháʼís. Their execution was committed despite observers testifying to their innocence.

The Shia clergy, as well as many Iranians, have continued to regard Baháʼís as heretics (the founder of Baháʼí, Baháʼu'lláh, preached that his prophecies superseded Muhammad's), and consequently Baháʼís have encountered much prejudice and have often been the objects of persecution. The situation of the Baháʼís improved under the Pahlavi shahs when the government actively sought to secularize public life, but there were still organizations actively persecuting the Baháʼís (in addition curses children would learn decrying the Báb and Baháʼís). The Hojjatieh was a semi-clandestine traditionalist Shia organization founded by Muslim clerics on the premise that the most immediate threat to Islam was the Baháʼí Faith. In March to June 1955, the Ramadan period that year, a widespread systematic program was undertaken cooperatively by the government and the clergy. During the period they destroyed the national Baháʼí Center in Tehran, confiscated properties and made it illegal for a time to be Baháʼí (punishable by 2 to 10-year prison term). The founder of SAVAK (the secret police during the rule of the shahs), Teymur Bakhtiar, took a pick-ax to a Baháʼí building himself at the time.

=== Buddhism ===
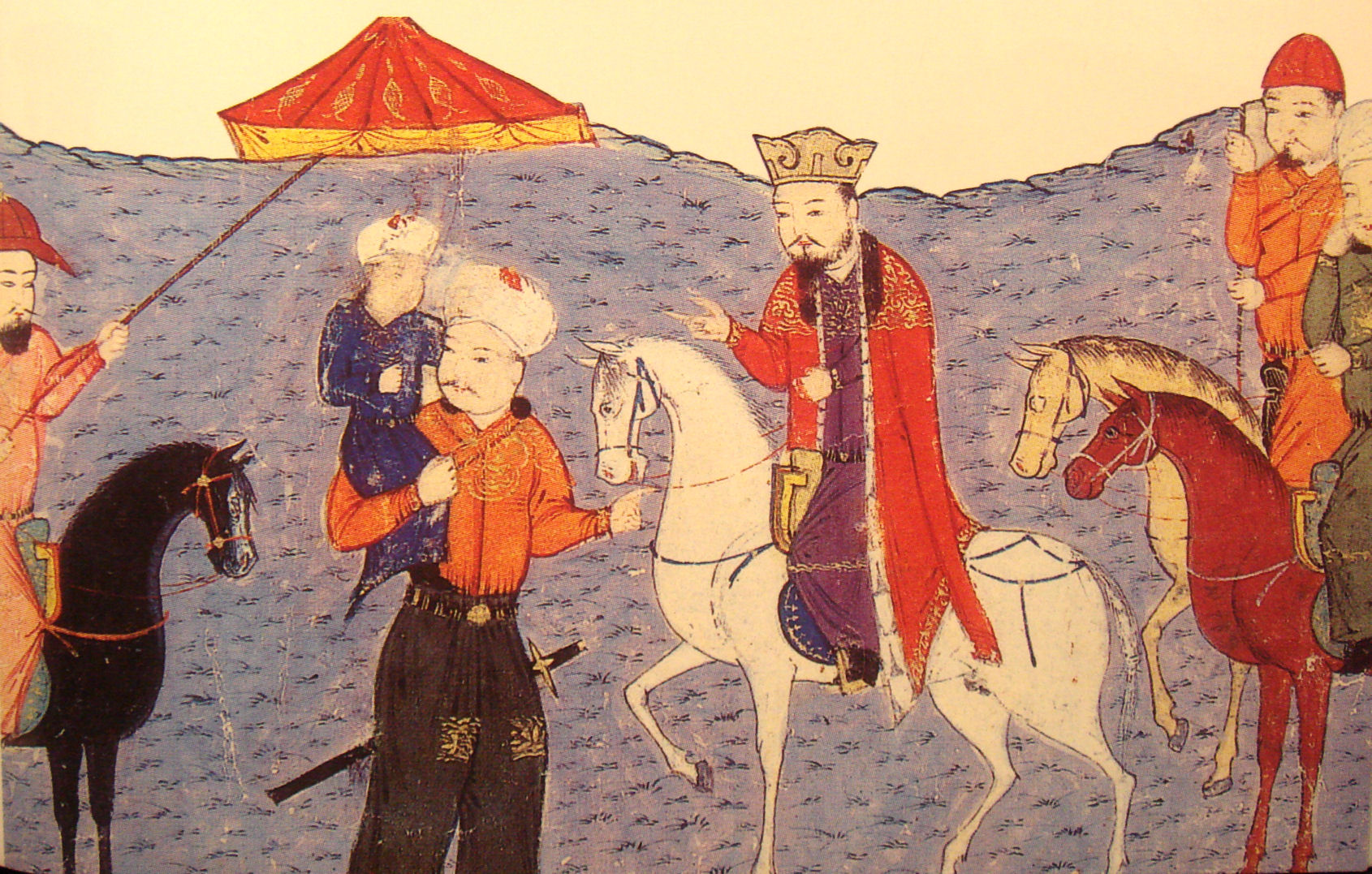
Mongol rulers Arghun and Abaqa were Buddhists. From the 14th century Universal History by Rashid-al-Din Hamadani.

Buddhism in Iran dates back to the 2nd century, when Parthians, such as An Shigao, were active in spreading Buddhism in China. Many of the earliest translators of Buddhist literature into Chinese were from Parthia and other kingdoms linked with present-day Iran.

=== Sikhism ===
There is a very small community of Sikhs in Iran numbering about 60 families mostly living in Tehran. Many of them are Iranian citizens. They also run a gurdwara in Tehran.

Sikhism in Iran is so uncommon amongst the families that many citizens of Tehran are not even aware of the gurdwara in their city. This is due to Tehran being the capital of Iran and the reputation that Iran has of being intolerant towards religions other than Shia. The United Nations has repeatedly accused Iran of persecuting citizens based on their religion. Although the Sikhs of Iran experience persecution like many other minority religions they are still envied by those other minority groups. Regular worshippers in Tehran have even stated that they feel no discrimination at all from fellow citizens of Tehran.

Sikhs began migrating to Iran around the start of the 20th century from British controlled areas of India that eventually became Pakistan. They originally settled in Eastern Iran and slowly moved towards Tehran. Before the Iranian Revolution of 1979 the Sikh community was believed to be as many as 5,000 strong, but after the revolution and the Iraqi war the numbers declined. Part of this exodus out of Iran was attributed to the new laws and restrictions on religion put in place by the new Iranian government.

Currently there are four gurdwaras in Iran: Tehran, Mashhad, Zahidan, and Bushehr. Every Friday morning and evening they participate in prayers, and Guru-Ka-Langer every Friday after the Akhand Path. They also participate in community service by establishing schools, and teaching young students Punjabi and Dharmik (Divinity). With the dwindling number of Sikhs in the area the school attached to the gurdwaras in Iran have been opened to non-Sikhs. The majority of the students still come from India or surrounding countries.

== Demographics ==
=== Surveys of current demographics ===
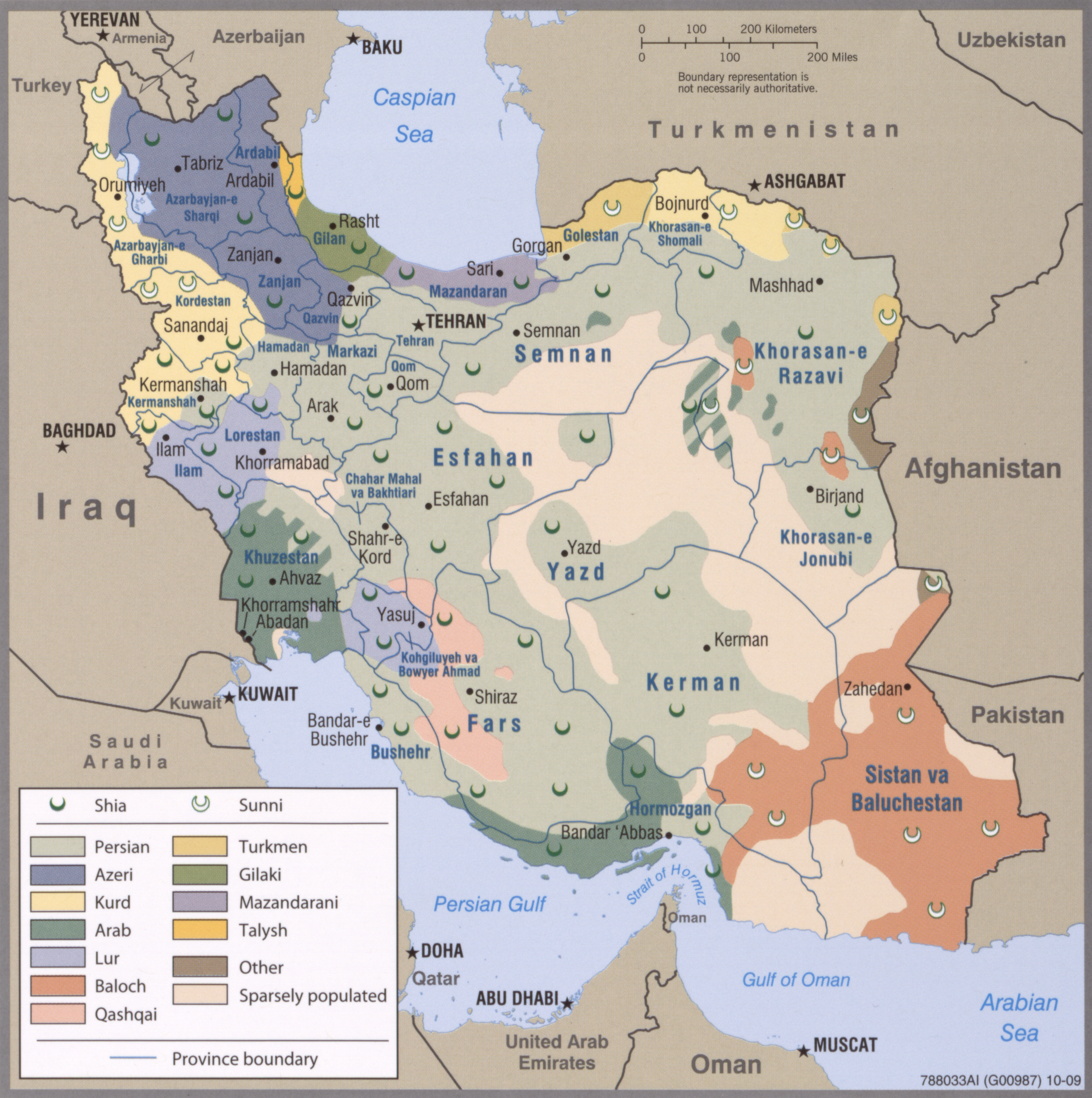
Iran's ethnoreligious distribution (2009)

A 2020 survey by the World Values Survey claim that 96.6% of Iranians believe in Islam. According to the CIA World Factbook, around 90–95% of Iranian Muslims associate themselves with the Shia branch of Islam, the official state religion, and about 5–10% with the Sunni branch of Islam. The CIA World Factbook estimated that in 2020 98.5% of the population adhered to Islam. According to the 2011 Iranian census, 99.38% of Iranians are claimed to believe in Islam, while the rest of the population believe in other officially recognized minority religions: Christianity, Judaism and Zoroastrianism. Because irreligion such as atheism and some other religions (including the Baháʼí Faith) are not recognized by the Iranian government, Iranian citizens born in nominally Muslim families are labelled Muslim despite individual beliefs, and because apostates from Islam are subject to capital punishment, governmental figures are distorted.

=== Statistics on religious belief and religiosity ===
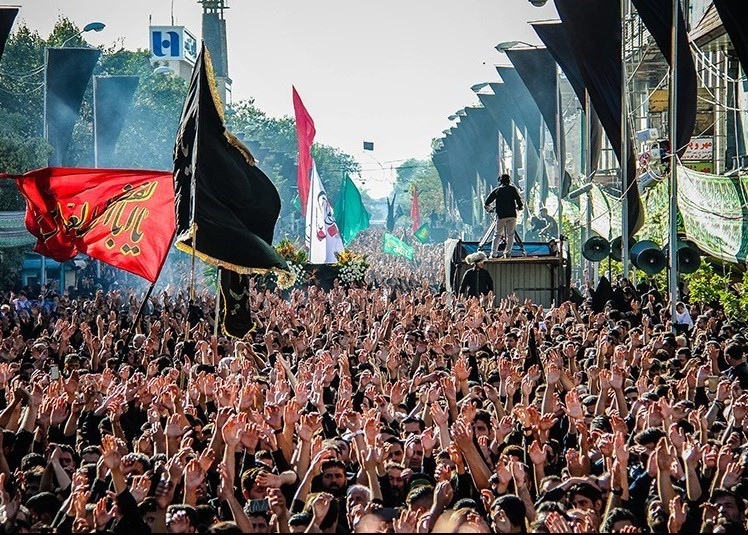
Mourning of Muharram in Zanjan, 2017

The constitution of Iran limits the number of recognized non-Islamic religions to three – Zoroastrians, Jews, and Christians – and the laws of the Islamic Republic forbid atheism and conversion by Muslims to another religion. Obtaining accurate data on religious belief in Iran presents challenges to pollsters because Iranians do not always feel "comfortable sharing their opinions with strangers".

According to the U.S. News & World Report a survey of various attributes and nations were presented which nearly 17,000 people from across the globe from 22 March to 23 May took part in which Iran was placed 3rd on the ranking of the most religious and practicing nations of 2024.

A 2024 Gallup report conducted across multiple countries, including Iran, stated that in Iran, 72% of respondents said they were religious, 27% said they were not religious, and 1% said they were atheist.

2011 General Census Results Note: other groups are officially excluded
Religion	Percent	Number
Muslim	99.3789%	74,682,938
Christian	0.1566%	117,704
Zoroastrian	0.0336%	25,271
Jewish	0.0117%	8,756
Other	0.0653%	49,101
Undeclared	0.3538%	265,899

Surveys conducted by Western organizations
Source	Year	Results
Pew Research Center	2009	Of all Iranian Muslims, 90–95% are Shi’ites.
Pew Research Center	2010	Muslim (99.5%), Christian (112,100), unaffiliated (110,500), Hindus (16,400), Jews (<10,000), Buddhists (<10,000), folk religion (<10,000), other (149,400).
Gallup Poll	2016	Using "a mix of telephone and face-to-face interviews", 86% of Iranians said religion is "important in their lives", up from 76% in 2006.
Pew Research Center	2018	78% of Iranians believe religion to be very important in their lives. The same study also found that 38% of Iranians attend worship services weekly.
Pew Research Center	2019	87% of Iranians pray on a daily basis, the second-highest percentage in the Asia-Pacific after Afghanistan (96%) and ahead of Indonesia (84%).
World Value Survey	2022	96.6% of Iranians identify as Muslims, though 14.3% of Iranians also identify as not religious.
GAMAAN	2020	Shia (32.2%), None (22.2%), Atheist (8.8%), Agnostic (5.8%), Sunni (5.0%), Spiritual (7.1%), Zoroastrian (7.7%), Mystical (Sufi) (3.2%), Christian (1.5%), Baháʼí (0.5%), Jewish (0.1%), Other (5.9%). (Note: The survey was based on 50,000 respondents with 90% of those surveyed living in Iran. The survey was conducted in June 2020 for 15 days from June 17 to July 1, 2020. GAMAAN says the results reflect the views of literate Iranians over the age of 19 (equivalent to 85% of adults in Iran). According to its website, GAMAAN aims "to extract (real) opinions of Iranians about sensitive issues and questions that cannot be freely answered under the existing situation in Iran by using innovative approaches and utilizing digital tools." Pew Research has noted that "GAMAAN’s findings have not yet been replicated by other research organizations. Some of the most anomalous results, such as a relatively large share of Zoroastrians, have led scholars to wonder whether 'participating in surveys beyond the government’s control' gave discontented Iranians an opportunity for 'performing alternative identity aspirations.'")
GAMAAN	2022	February 2022 survey: Shia (56%), None (12%), Atheist (10%), Agnostic (7%), Sunni (5%), Spiritual (4%), Zoroastrian (1%). December 2022 survey: Shia (37.5%), None (8.5%), Believer in God without religion (26.4%), Atheist (7.4%), Agnostic (2.6%), Sunni (5.1%), Spiritual (2.6%), Zoroastrian (4.6%), Mystical (Sufi) (0.9%), Christian (0.3%), Yarsani (0.5%), Baháʼí (0.2%), Jewish (0.15%), Other (2.95%).
GAMAAN	2023	Shia (37.9%), None (6.6%), Believer in God without religion (17.3%) Humanist (16.1%), Atheist (6.5%), Agnostic (1.6%), Sunni (4.9%), Spiritual (1.6%), Zoroastrian (2.8%), Mystical (Sufi) (1.0%), Christian (0.5%), Yarsani (0.3%), Baháʼí (0.2%), Jewish (0.1%), Other (2.9%).

Before the 1979 Revolution, Shia clerics were among the most trusted societal groups. However, a confidential survey in 2023 by the Ministry of Islamic Guidance and Culture found that only 25% of respondents still have some level of trust in them. Approximately 56% expressed little to no trust, while the remaining 18% fell somewhere in between.

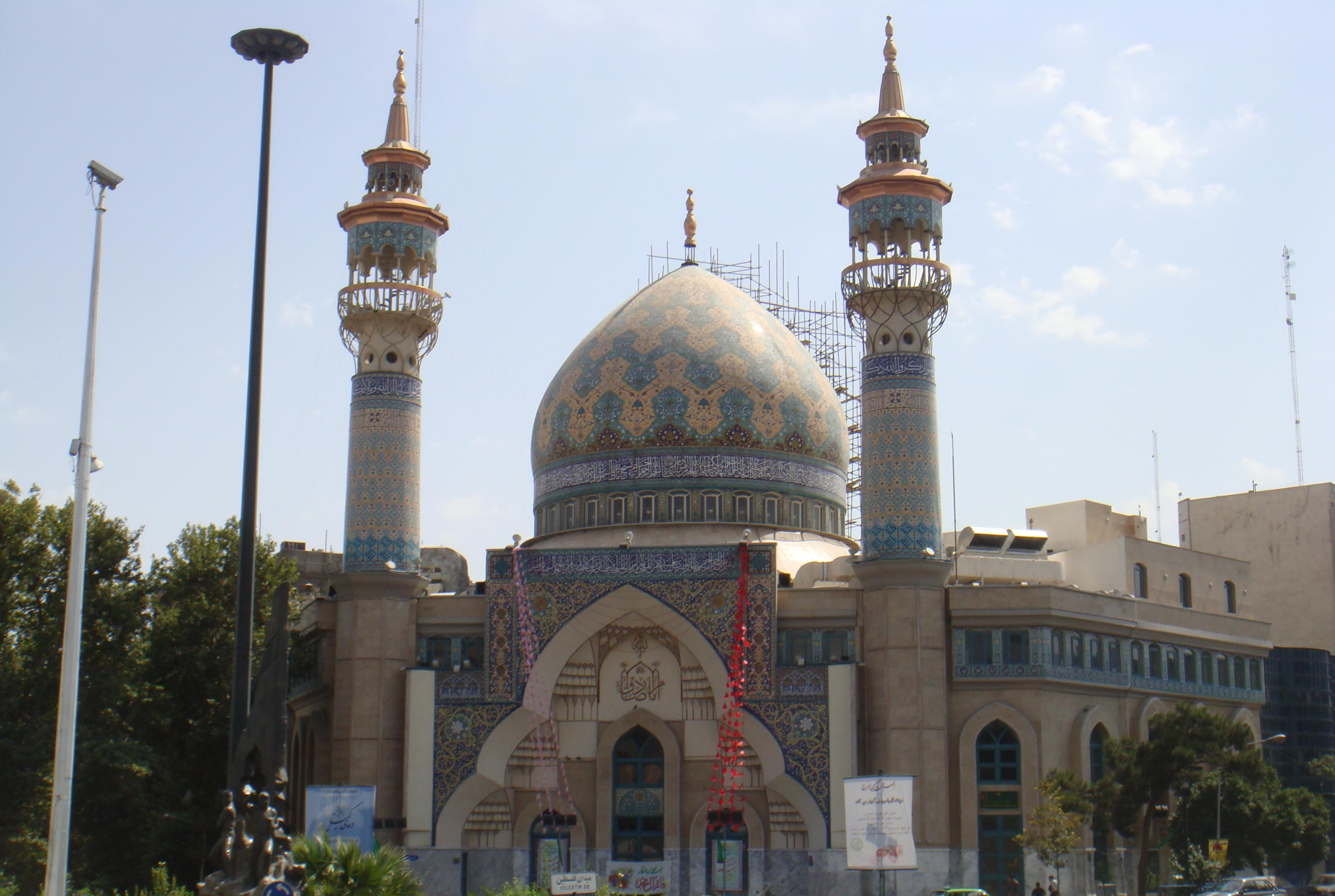
A Shia Mosque in Tehran

=== Religious minorities ===
There are several major religious minorities in Iran, including the Baháʼís (est. 300,000–350,000) and the Christians (est. 300,000–370,000), with one group, the Armenians of the Armenian Apostolic Church, composing between 200,000 and 300,000 members. Smaller groups include Jews, Zoroastrians, Mandaeans, and Yarsanism, as well as local religions practiced by tribal minorities.

== Contemporary ==
=== Legal status ===
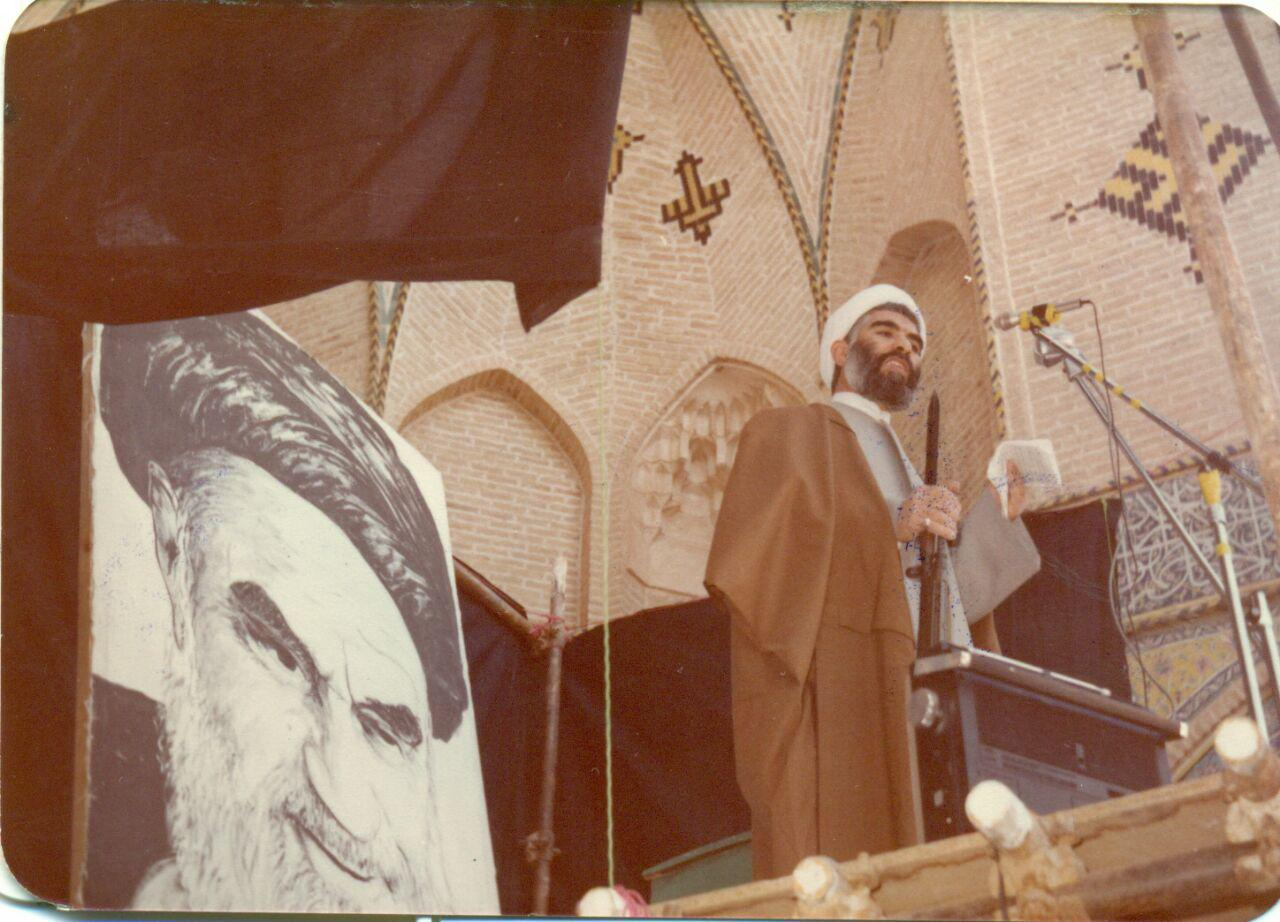
Khamenei's representative, Abbas Ali Akhtari giving a sermon in his first Friday prayer in Semnan, 1981. The Friday prayer plays an important role for the Iranian regime to declare its ideology and intentions.

The constitution of the Islamic Republic of Iran recognizes Islam, Christianity, Judaism, and Zoroastrianism as official religions. Article 13 of the Iranian Constitution, recognizes them as People of the Book and they are granted the right to exercise religious freedom in Iran. Five of the 270 seats in parliament are reserved for each of these three religions.

Zoroastrians, Jews, and Christians are officially recognized and protected by the government. For example, shortly after his return from exile in 1979, at a time of great unrest, the revolution's leader, Ayatollah Ruhollah Khomeini issued a fatwa ordering that Jews and other minorities be treated well.

In 2017 a controversy erupted around the reelection of a Zoroastrian municipal councilor in Yazd, because no clear legislation existed with regard to the matter. "On April 15, about one month before Iran's local and presidential elections", Ahmad Jannati, head of the Guardian Council, had "issued a directive demanding that non-Muslims be disqualified from running in the then-upcoming city and village council elections in localities where most of the population are Muslims". On 26 November 2017, Iranian lawmakers approved the urgency of a bill that would give the right for members of the religious minorities to nominate candidates for the city and village councils elections. The bill secured 154 yes votes, 23 no votes and 10 abstentions. A total of 204 lawmakers were present at the parliament session.

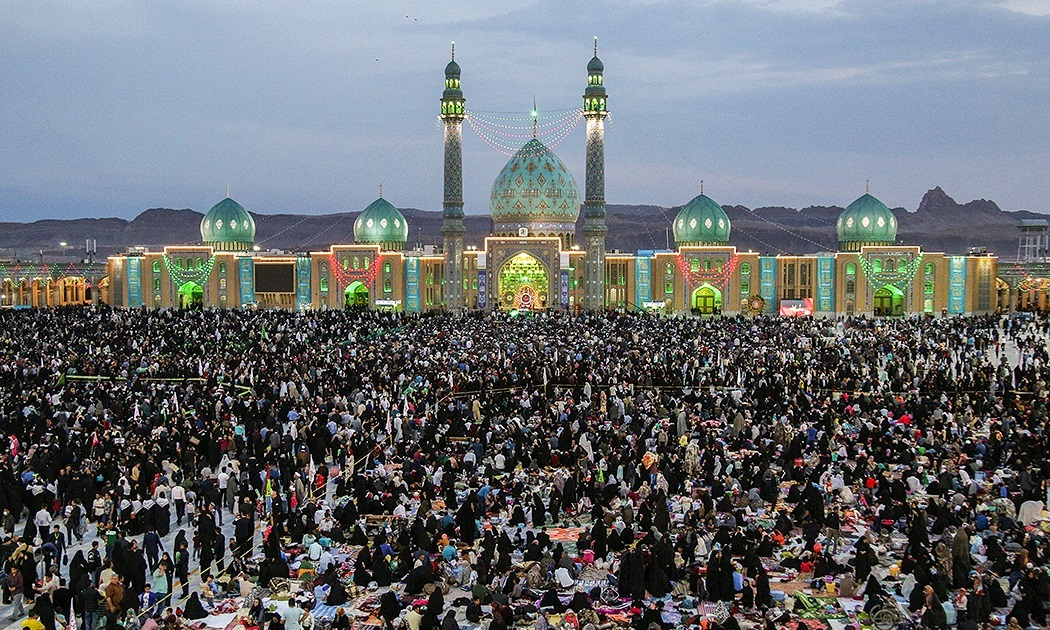
Half of Sha'ban celebration at Jamkaran Mosque, 2018

On the other hand, senior government posts are reserved for Muslims. Members of all minority religious groups, including Sunni Muslims, are barred from being elected president. Jewish, Christian and Zoroastrian schools must be run by Muslim principals.

Until recently the amount of monetary compensation which was paid to the family for the death of a non-Muslim victim was (by law) lower than the amount of monetary compensation which was paid to the family for the death of a Muslim victim. Conversion to Islam is encouraged by islamic inheritance laws, which mean that by converting to Islam, converts will inherit the entire share of their parents' (or even the entire share of their uncle's) estate if their siblings (or cousins) remain non-Muslim.

Collectively, these laws, regulations and general discrimination and persecution have led to Iran's non-Muslim population falling dramatically. For example, the Jewish population in Iran dropped from 80,000 to 30,000 in the first two decades following the revolution (roughly 1978–2000). By 2012, it had dwindled below 9,000.

=== Religious freedom ===
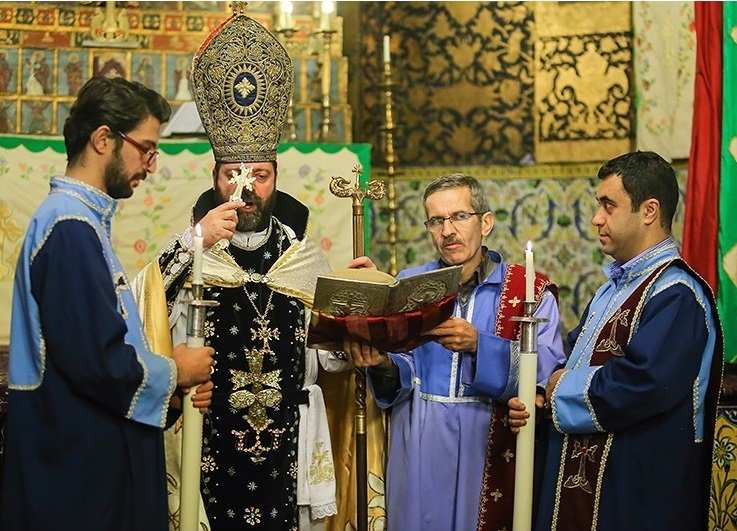
New Year's Eve celebrations at the Armenian Apostolic Vank Cathedral in Isfahan, 2018

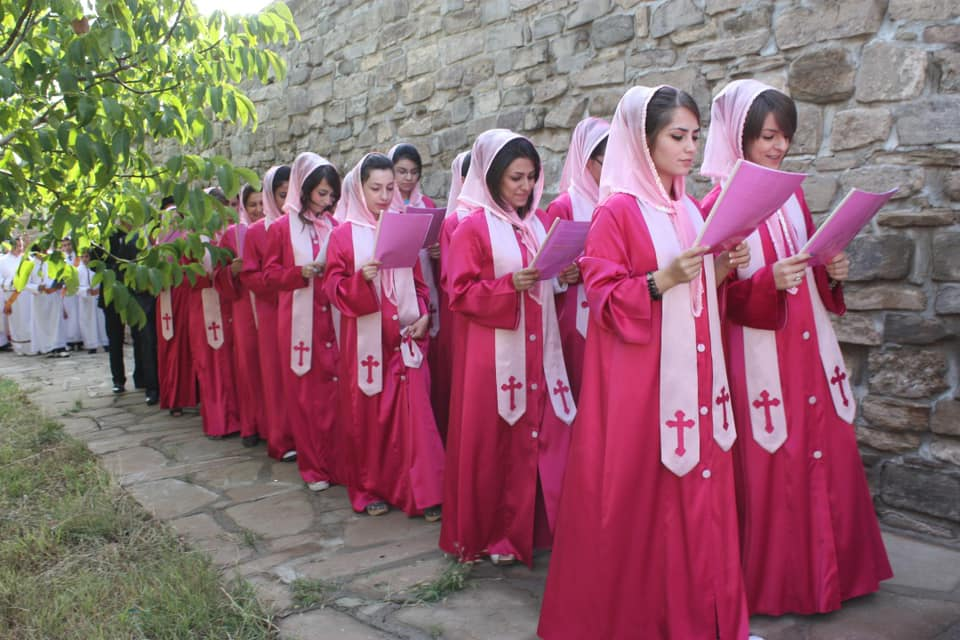
Assyrian Christians in Urmia, Iran, 2022

Iran is an Islamic republic. Its constitution mandates that the official religion is Islam (see: Islam in Iran), specifically the Twelver Ja'fari school of Islam, with other Islamic schools being accorded full respect. Followers of all Islamic schools are free to perform religious rites in accordance with their own jurisprudence, although the country does not recognize some movements such as the Ahmadiyya. The constitution recognizes Zoroastrian, Jewish, and Christian Iranians as religious minorities.

While several religious minorities lack equal rights with Muslims, complaints about religious freedom largely revolve around the persecution of the Baháʼí Faith, the country's largest religious minority, which faces active persecution. During 2005, several important Baháʼí cemeteries and holy places have been demolished, and there were reports of imprisonment, harassment, intimidation, discrimination, and murder based on religious beliefs.

Hudud statutes grant different punishments to Muslims and non-Muslims for the same crime. In the case of adultery, for example, a Muslim man who is convicted of committing adultery with a Muslim woman receives 100 lashes; the sentence for a non-Muslim man convicted of adultery with a Muslim woman is death. In 2004, inequality of "blood money" (diya) was eliminated, and the amount paid by a perpetrator for the death or wounding a Christian, Jew, or Zoroastrian man was made the same as that for a Muslim. However, in 2009, the International Religious Freedom Report reported that Baháʼís were not included in the provision and their blood is considered Mobah, (i.e. it can be spilled with impunity).

Conversion from Islam to another religion (apostasy) is prohibited and may be punishable by death. Article 23 of the constitution states, "the investigation of individuals' beliefs is forbidden, and no one may be molested or taken to task simply for holding a certain belief." But another article, 167, gives judges the discretion "to deliver his judgment on the basis of authoritative Islamic sources and authentic fatwa (rulings issued by qualified clerical jurists)." The founder of the Islamic Republic, Islamic cleric Ruhollah Khomeini, who was a grand Ayatollah, ruled "that the penalty for conversion from Islam, or apostasy, is death."

At least two Iranians – Hashem Aghajari and Hassan Yousefi Eshkevari – have been arrested and charged with apostasy (though not executed), not for converting to another faith but for statements and/or activities deemed by courts of the Islamic Republic to be in violation of Islam, and that appear to outsiders to be Islamic reformist political expression. Hashem Aghajari, was found guilty of apostasy for a speech urging Iranians to "not blindly follow" Islamic clerics; Hassan Youssefi Eshkevari was charged with apostasy for attending the Iran After the Elections conference in Berlin, Germany, which was disrupted by anti-government demonstrators.

On 16 November 2018, two jailed Sufi Dervishes started a hunger strike demanding information on the whereabouts of their eight friends.

In November 2018, the warden of Qarchak Prison in Varamin, near Tehran, attacked and bit three female Dervish prisoners when they demanded the return of their confiscated belongings.

For the year 2022, the Human Rights Activists in Iran Annual Report listed 199 cases involving religious rights, including 140 arrests, 94 cases of police home raids, 2 cases of demolition of religious sites, 39 cases of imprisonment, 51 issuances of travel bans (which constitute violations of freedom of movement) and 11 cases of individuals brought to trial for their religious beliefs. Almost two thirds (64.63%) of the cases involved the violation of the rights of Baha’is, while 20.84% involved the rights of Christians, 8.84% Yarsanis, 4.63% Sunnis, and 0.42% Dervishes.

In 2024, the country was scored zero out of four for religious freedom by Freedom House, and in that same year, ranked as the 8th most difficult place in the world to be a Christian by Open Doors.

=== Baháʼí Faith ===
The Baháʼí Faith has been persecuted since its inception in Iran. Since the 1979 revolution the persecution of Baháʼís has increased with oppression, the denial of civil rights and liberties, and the denial of access to higher education and employment. There were an estimated 350,000 Baháʼís in Iran in 1986. The Baháʼís are scattered in small communities throughout Iran with a heavy concentration in larger cities. Most Baháʼís are urban, but there are some Baháʼí villages, especially in Fars and Mazandaran. The majority of Baháʼís are Persians, but there is a significant minority of Azeri Baháʼís, and there are even a few among the Kurds. Baháʼís are neither recognized nor protected by the Iranian constitution.

The social situation of the Baháʼís was drastically altered after the 1979 revolution. The Hojjatieh group flourished during the 1979 revolution but was forced to dissolve after Ayatollah Ruhollah Khomeini speech on 12 August 1983. However, there are signs of it reforming circa 2002–04. Beyond the Hojjatieh group, the Islamic Republic does not recognize the Baháʼís as a religious minority, and they have been officially persecuted, "some 200 of whom have been executed and the rest forced to convert or subjected to the most horrendous disabilities." Starting in late 1979 the new government systematically targeted the leadership of the Baháʼí community by focusing on the Baháʼí National Spiritual Assembly (NSA) and Local Spiritual Assemblies (LSAs); prominent members of NSAs and LSAs were either killed or disappeared. Like most conservative Muslims, Khomeini believed them to be apostates, for example issuing a fatwa stating:

It is not acceptable that a tributary [non-Muslim who pays tribute] changes his religion to another religion not recognized by the followers of the previous religion. For example, from the Jews who become Baháʼís nothing is accepted except Islam or execution.

and emphasized that the Baháʼís would not receive any religious rights, since he believed that the Baháʼís were a political rather than religious movement.

the Baháʼís are not a sect but a party, which was previously supported by Britain and now the United States. The Baháʼís are also spies just like the Tudeh [Communist Party].

This is all despite the fact that conversion from Judaism and Zoroastrianism in Iran is well documented since the 1850s – indeed such a change of status removing legal and social protections.

Allegations of Baháʼí involvement with other powers have long been repeated in many venues including denunciations from the president.

During the drafting of the new constitution, the wording intentionally excluded the Baháʼís from protection as a religious minority. More recently, documentation has been provided that shows governmental intent to destroy the Baháʼí community. The government has intensified propaganda and hate speech against Baháʼís through the Iranian media; Baháʼís are often attacked and dehumanized on political, religious, and social grounds to separate Baháʼís from the rest of society. According to Eliz Sanasarian "Of all non-Muslim religious minorities the persecution of the Bahais [sic] has been the most widespread, systematic, and uninterrupted.… In contrast to other non-Muslim minorities, the Bahais [sic] have been spread throughout the country in villages, small towns, and various cities, fueling the paranoia of the prejudiced."

Since the 1979 revolution, the authorities have destroyed most or all of the Baháʼí holy places in Iran, including the House of the Bab in Shiraz, a house in Tehran where Bahá'u'lláh was brought up, and other sites connected to aspects of Babi and Baháʼí history. These demolitions have sometimes been followed by the construction of mosques in a deliberate act of triumphalism. Many or all of the Baháʼí cemeteries in Iran have been demolished and corpses exhumed. Indeed, several agencies and experts and journals have published concerns about viewing the developments as a case of genocide: Roméo Dallaire, Genocide Watch, Sentinel Project for Genocide Prevention, War Crimes, Genocide, & Crimes against Humanity and the Journal of Genocide Research.

=== Irreligion ===
Non-religious Iranians are officially unrecognized by the Iranian government, this leaves the true representation of the religious split in Iran unknown as all non-religious, spiritual, atheist, agnostic and converts away from Islam are likely to be included within the government statistic of the 99% Muslim majority.

According to Moaddel and Azadarmaki (2003), fewer than 5% of Iranians do not believe in God. A 2009 Gallup poll showed that 83% of Iranians said religion is an important part of their daily life. The 2020 online survey conducted by GAMAAN (mentioned above) found a higher share of Iranians that self-identify as atheists – 8.8%. Two additional surveys by GAMAAN conducted in February and December 2022 found that 10% and 7% of participants reported being atheists, respectively. A July 2023 GAMAAN survey, conducted with the assistance of U.S. government-funded VPN providers Psiphon and Lantern, found 7% of respondents self-identified as atheists and that, having introduced the option for the first time,16% identified as humanist.

According to the Economist magazine in 2003, some Iranian clergy have complained that more than 70% of the population do not perform their daily prayers and that less than 2% attend Friday mosques. In February 2023, senior Iranian cleric Mohammad Abolghassem Doulabi reported that 50,000 mosques had been closed due to a sharp drop in attendance. Doulabi, primarily laid the blame for the mosque closures due to the lack of government funding as Mosques in Iran are run similarly to churches in the United States as they are tax-exempt and are non-profit institutions that are primarily supported through donations and trusts. While in Iran certain mosques may receive government funding, in addition to private funding, the government is not the main and primary supporter and neither does it have the authority to close mosques. Doulabi blamed the devaluation of the Iranian currency and a lack of direct government support for the closures. Doulabi further clarfied, "Despite the economic problems, the participation of people in large numbers in various programs is a clear indication of their exemplary patience and tolerance that they are with the Islamic State. The closing of the doors of many mosques is a matter that has nothing to do with the religiosity of the people. Rather, it is due to a number of other reasons, including the lack of infrastructure necessary for the imams to stay, the lack of supervision of the mosques from the center of local management, the mosque being confined to the prayer hall, etc." One of these factors is the absence of a full time Imam. The management of the mosque requires the necessary infrastructure, including a stable resource to cover the cost of hiring two full-time employees. In this, the role of madrassa in training the imams is also very important." According to Pooyan Tamimi Arab and Ammar Maleki of GAMAAN detailing their survey results in the Conversation, over 60% of Iranians surveyed said they "did not perform the obligatory Muslim daily prayers", synchronous with "a 2020 state-backed poll" in Tehran in which "60% reported not observing" Ramadan fasting (the majority due to being “sick”). Tamimi Arab and Maleki contrast this with, "a comprehensive survey" conducted two years before the Islamic Revolution, where "over 80% said they always prayed and observed" Ramadan.

However, according to a Pew Research Center survey conducted in 2018 said, 78% of Iranians believe religion to be very important in their lives. The same study also found that 38% of Iranians attend worship services weekly. While another 2019 Pew Research Center, survey said 87% of Iranians pray on a daily basis, which was the second-highest percentage in Asia-Pacific, after Afghanistan (96%) and ahead of Indonesia (84%).

While according to the World Values Survey a survey was conducted in 2020 which stated 70.5% Iranians considered religion important in their lives while 22% said it was somewhat important, 4.1% said religion wasn't important in their lives. When asked how often they pray, 63.7% said they prayed several times a day while 10% said they pray once a day, 7.2% said they pray several times a week, 6.6% said they pray only when attending religious events, 3.8% said only during holy days, 0.7% said once a year, 2.5% said less often and 5.4% said they never pray.

A 2024 Gallup report conducted across multiple countries, including Iran, stated that in Iran, 72% of respondents said they were religious, 27% said they were not religious, and 1% said they were atheist.

The irreligiosity figures in the diaspora are higher, notably among Iranian-Americans.

== See also ==
- Buddhism in Iran
- Christianity in Iran
- Freedom of religion in Iran
- Hinduism in Iran
- History of the Jews in Iran
- Human rights in Iran
- Human rights in the Islamic Republic of Iran
- Iranian religions
- Irreligion in Iran
- Islam in Iran
- Mardavij, a Persian Zoroastrian commander who unsuccessfully tried to overthrow Arab Muslim rule in Iran
- Persian Jews
- Religion and culture in ancient Iran
- Religion in the Achaemenid Empire
- Religion in the Parthian Empire
- Religion in the Sasanian Empire
- Religion of Iranian-Americans
- Shia clergy
- Sikhism in Iran
- Zoroastrians in Iran
