= Mazdaism =

Ancient Persian religion related to Zoroastrianism

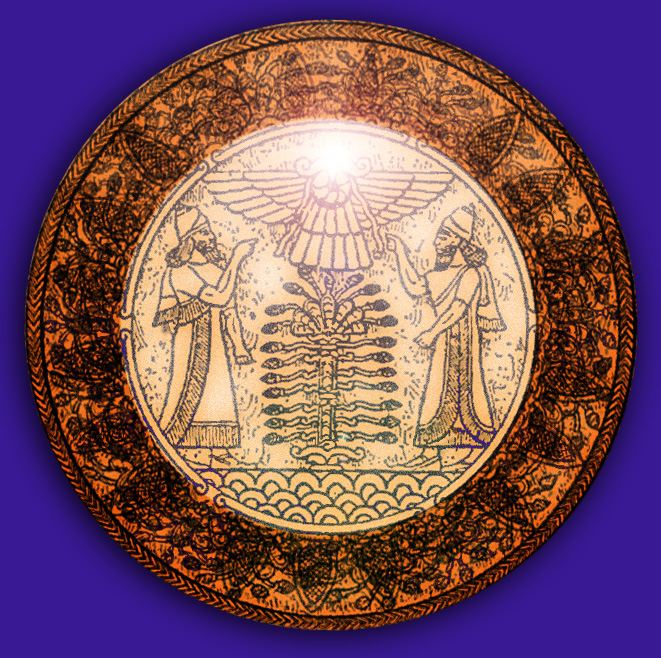
Mazda embroidery decoration from a royal cloak from the Achaemenid era

Mazdaism (Armenian: Մազդէականութիւն, romanized: Mazdēakanut'iwn; Persian: آیین مزدایی, romanized: Āyīn-e Mazdāyī, lit. 'Doctrine of Mazda') is a name of religion believed to be the precursor to Zoroastrianism; it included deities such as Mithra, Anahita, and Ahura Mazda, the latter being the supreme god, but lacked the figure of Ahriman. Researchers often use this term to describe the religion of the Achaemenids, given the academic debate regarding whether or not the Achaemenids were Zoroastrians.

== Definition of Mazdaism ==
Jacques Duchesne-Guillemin argued that Mazdaism was an ancient Iranian religion predating Zoroastrianism, centered on the worship of Ahura Mazda but lacking the ethical dualism that Zarathustra would later introduce. Ilya Gershevitch argues that Mazdaism is not a religion but rather a syncretic set of religious beliefs that magi helped to establish.

== Ahura Mazda ==
The worship of Ahura Mazda, as some Zoroastrian historians believe, did not originate with Zoroaster but existed before the prophet's message. According to Robert Zahner, the pre-Zoroastrian Ahura was undoubtedly also associated with truth, a kind of "universal order", and with water, light, or the sun.

Émile Benveniste points out that Ahura Mazda is a very ancient deity and that the Zoroastrians used this name to refer to the Zoroastrian god. Even the central role assigned to this god in Mazdaism is not a Zoroastrian innovation; the term for Mazdaism (i.e., worship of Mazda) found in Aramaic papyri from the Achaemenid period cannot be evidence that the Achaemenids were Zoroastrian, and the mention of the name "Ahura Mazda" in stone inscriptions is not evidence of this either, in the Achaemenid inscriptions, not only is Zoroastrianism not mentioned, but nothing else is mentioned that could give these inscriptions a Zoroastrian signal.

Long before Zoroaster, the early Iranians held defined religious beliefs and worshipped Ahura Mazda as a great god. In the Behistun Inscription, Darius the Great mentions Ahura Mazda as "the greatest of the gods". Ahura Mazda's name appears 69 times in the Behistun, and Darius claims to be under Ahura Mazda's protection 34 times. Darius neither claimed that Ahura Mazda was the only existing god, nor did his great rival Angremenu (Ahriman).

Jacques Duchesne-Guillemin wrote: "It seems easier to believe that the Achaemenids had never heard of Zoroaster, nor of his religious reforms". Abdolhossein Zarrinkoob wrote: "In the Achaemenid era, the Magis did not have a Zoroastrian religion, nor did they have a royal family, considering the role that the Magis played in performing Persian religious ceremonies, and considering that the Achaemenid and dynastic religion could not conflict with the beliefs of the common classes of the Persian clans. It is clear that the Zoroastrian religion had not yet had an influence among the Persians during these periods."

== Trends ==
=== Turya religion ===
The northern branch of Mazdaism is known in modern historical studies as Turanism. Turanism is an ethnic name for a group mentioned in the Avesta and named after the region of Turan, but the Turanians are not mentioned in historical records of the first millennium BC. Achaemenid sources consistently use the term "Saka" to refer to the nomads of the northern steppes, while Greek authors often refer to them as "Scythians". However, scholars like Mary Boyce agree that the Turanians were Iranian steppe nomads living in the Eurasian steppes north of the ancient Iranians.

=== Medes religion ===
Some researchers like Muhammad A. Dandamayev and Inna N. Medvedskaya believe that the people of the Median kingdom practiced a Mazdaism religion in the two centuries preceding the Achaemenid period, and this is the opinion of Henrik Samuel Nyberg The practice of Mazdaism in Media during the Achaemenid, Hellenistic, and Parthian periods is, however, attested by Greek accounts. Thus, a temple dedicated to the great Iranian goddess Anahita at Ecbatana, mentioned by Polybius, who reports its construction by the Achaemenid king Artaxerxes II, is still mentioned in the Parthian period by Polybius and Isidore of Carax. The latter mentions another great temple to this goddess (whom he likens to the Greek Artemis) in Media, at Kangavar, the ruins of which have been excavated .

== See also ==
- Religion in the Achaemenid Empire
- Religion in the Parthian era
- Religion in the Sasanian Empire
