= Druj =

Zoroastrian concept

Druj or Drug (Avestan: 𐬛𐬭𐬎𐬘) is a Zoroastrian concept interpreted to mean "lie" or "deceit". It has a strong connection to the Zoroastian notion of Evil, and, within Zoroastrian ethics, it is the principle opponent of Asha.

== Name ==
Young Avestan: 𐬛𐬭𐬎𐬘 is commonly transliterated into Latin script as druj or drug. It is derived from Old Avestan 𐬛𐬭𐬎𐬑𐬱 (druxš) and cognate with Vedic द्रुह् (druh, "deceit"). Both derive from a common Proto-Indo-Iranian *dʰrúkš ("lie, deceit"), itself derived from Proto-Indo-European *dʰrewgʰ- ("to deceive"). As such, druj has also cognates in other Indo-European languages like Scottish Gaelic droch ("bad, evil") and German Trug ("deceit, illusion"). An important derivation is Young Avestan druuaṇt and Old Avestan drəguuant, both meaning follower of Druj.

Within Zoroastrianism, Druj is defined in opposition to Asha, giving the concept a distinct metaphysical and ethical dimension. Beyond literal translations such as "falsehood" or "wrongness", scholars have, therefore, frequently rendered the term more broadly as "cosmic deception", "the Lie", or "cosmic disorder", to convey its wider cosmological scope. To distinguish the more mundane meaning of lie vs. the more cosmic meaning of the underlying force, scholars sometimes use druj and Druj, respectively.

== In the Avesta ==
A comprehensive list of all occurrences of druj in the Avesta is provided by Bartholomae. It is first mentioned in the Gathas, the oldest part of the Avesta, often attributed to Zarathustra himself. In the Gathas, the opposition between Druj and Asha is primary aspect of the Zoroastrian dualism between Good and Evil. This opposition is represented in this world by the followers of Druj, the drəguuants, and the followers of Asha, i.e., the group following the Gathas. These followers of Druj are a specific group and some of them are named in the texts.

In the Young Avestan texts, the cosmic dualism between Good and Evil is still present but less specifically connected with Druj and Asha. Although the word druj is grammatically female, it is both applied to the female daeva Nasu and the male daeva Buiti. According to the Zamyad Yasht, Yima's fall from grace happened when he was seduced by Druj. According to the same yasht, Druj will be eventually defeated by Asha during the final renovation of the world.

== Development of the term ==
A comparison with other Indo-European philosophical systems indicates that a general opposition between the ordered cosmos and chaos may go back to the Proto-Indo-European period. Moreover, the closely related Vedic religion knows the corresponding terms of Ṛta and druh. However, they lack the cosmic opposition, with druh being merely the "lie" without any cosmic relevance or personal agency. This indicates that the Zoroastrian concept of Druj was an innovation of Zarathustra. In its developped form, the opposition between Asha and Druj has been described as one of the pillars of Zoroastrian morality.

== Connection to Old Persian drauga ==
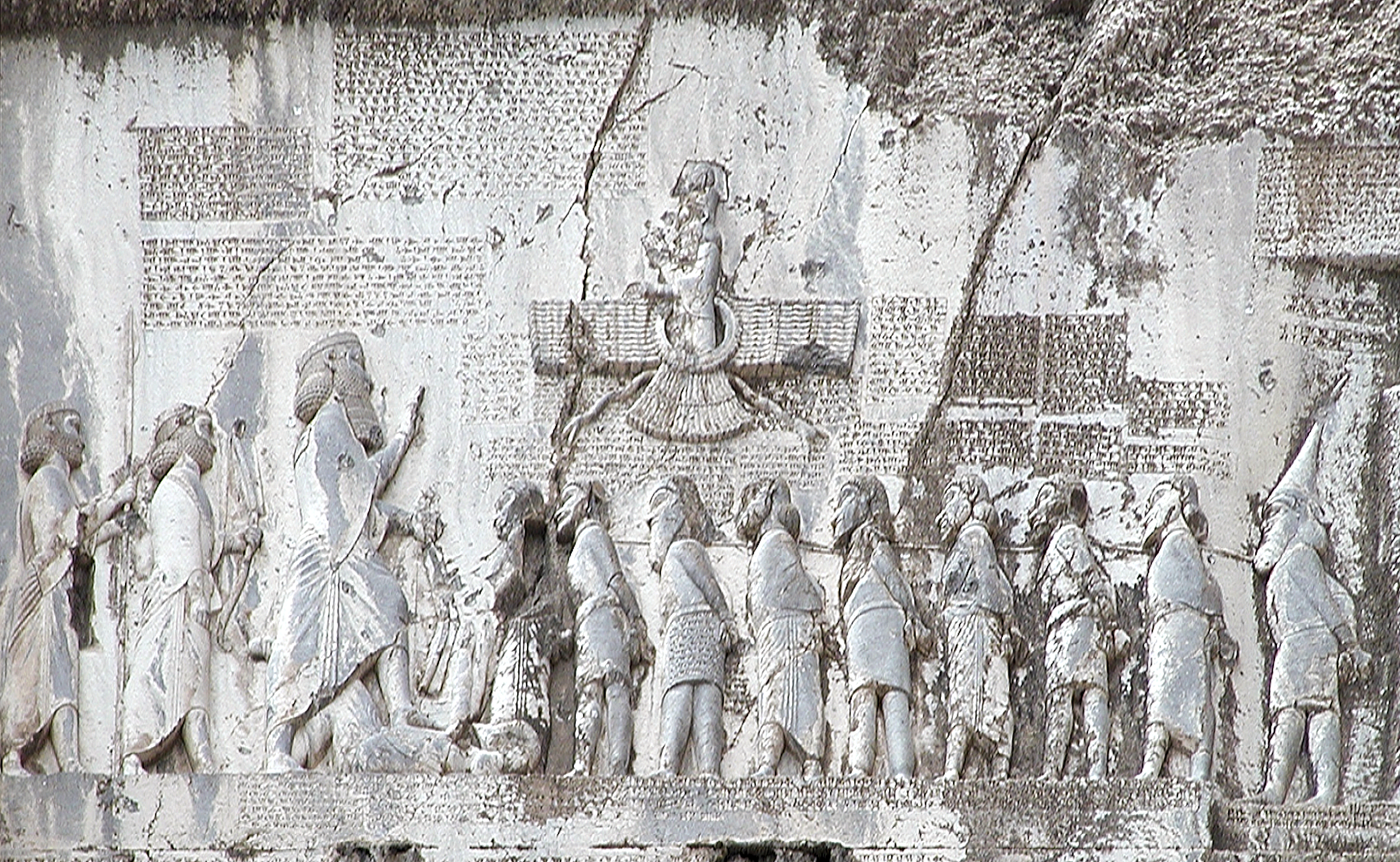
The Behistun inscription of Darius I frequently mentions drauga, the Old Persian word for "lie".

In the Achaemenid inscriptions of Darius the Great, the Old Persian word drauga appears. This term and its exact relationship to Avestan druj has been long debated. Its precise meaning plays a role within the wider discussion on the nature of the Mazda-worship and, therefore, of the religion of the Achaemenid kings. In particular the question of whether they followed a form Zoroastrianism or not has been widely debated.

On the one hand, Old Persian drauga is not the direct cognate of Avestan druj but its derivation draoga. Moreover drauga is never directly contrasted with arta, the Old Persian cognate of Avestan asha. On the other hand, proponents of a Zoroastrian interpretation have pointed toward a number of facts that support a direct connection to Aveastan druj. Schwartz has noted that drauga is described as an active, personal agent similar to Druj. Malandra observes that drauga is used in the inscriptions beyond simply meaning "lie" but instead conveys a wider sense of "moral, social, and political chaos". Finally, Skjaervø notes that, while not directly opposed to arta, drauga is in fact presented within a direct opposition between Good and Evil. These observations point to the fact that drauga represents the Old Persian rendering of the Zoroastrian Druj.
