= Religion in the Achaemenid Empire =

Aspect of ancient Iranian society

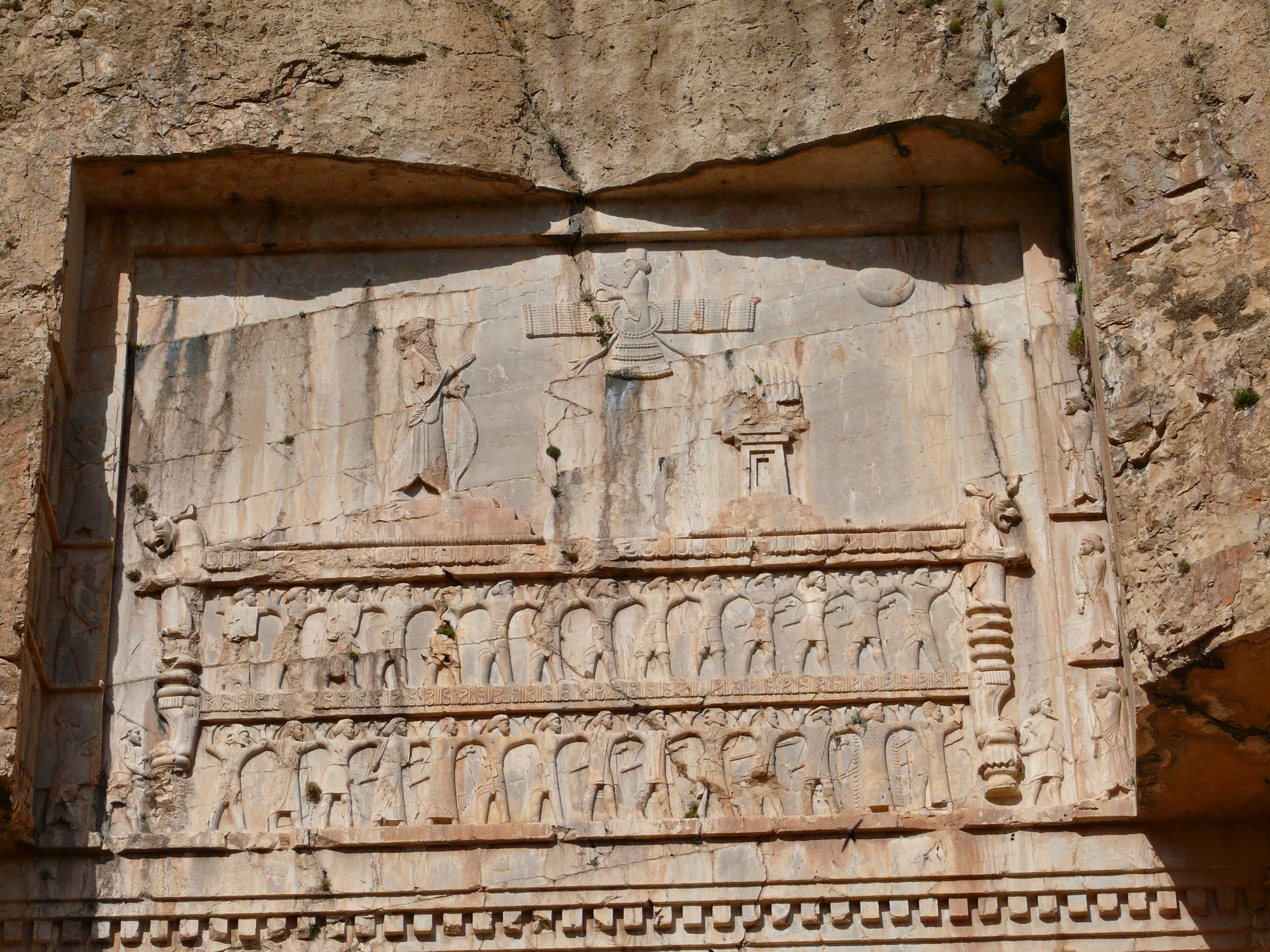
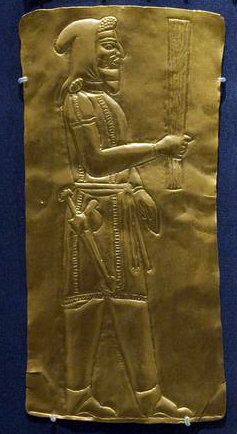
Clockwise from upper left: Xerxes I with Fire altar and Faravahar; Stone carved Faravahar in Persepolis; Zoroastrian Magus carrying barsom from the Oxus Treasure; two Magi from Dascylium (Phrygia) sacrificing a sheep and a bull

Religion in the Achaemenid Empire was characterised by diverse religious cults and practices. The Achaemenid kings promoted the worship of Ahura Mazda but were tolerant of local beliefs. Within the wider Achaemenid empire, many Near Eastern cults existed, whereas the Persian heartland was characterized by a blend of Elamite and Iranian religious traditions.

One of the most debated topics in the scholarly community concerns the precise nature of the Mazda-worship by the Achaemenid kings. While there is an agreement among scholars that at least toward the end of the Achaemenid period, Zoroastrianism was the dominant religion, interpretations regarding the early kings can diverge substantially.

== Sources ==
Sources on the social, political and religious conditions of the Achaemenid Empire are mixed. On the one hand, the "Persians did not write historical accounts and preferred oral narratives." Direct evidence include the Achaemenid royal inscriptions, the Persian Fortification Tablets, the Elephantine papyri, as well as archeological evidence including the ruins of Persepolis, Susa and Pasargadae. External evidence is provided by a number of Greek authors.

=== Achaemenid royal inscriptions ===
The Achaemenid royal inscriptions present direct evidence of religious concepts and ideas of the early Achaemenid kings like Darius the Great and Xerxes. They show that they worshipped Ahura Mazda as their supreme god. In addition, starting with the reign of Artaxerxes II, the worship of Mithra and Anahita is promoted. Moreover, one inscription by Xerxes demonstrate that the Mazda-worship of the Achaemenids included a rejection of the daevas.

=== Persepolis Administrative Archives ===
The Persepolis Administrative Archives refers to administrative records of receipts, taxation, storage etc. They cover the area around Persepolis and contain records from 509 to 457 BCE. As a result, they provide a detailed snapshot of the economic conditions in the Achaemenid heartland during the time of the early kings. Although they contain no direct references to religious ideas and concepts, some of them describe how food rations were provided for the performance of religious rituals. A detailed analysis by Henkelman has shown that most of the royal offerings were intended for the Elamite god Humban (see below), while other Iranian and non-Iranian gods are also mentioned. This demonstrates that while Ahura Mazda was of central importance to the self-identification of the Achaemenid kings, he was far less significant during this time to the general population in Persia proper.

=== Greek writers ===
The Greeks began to write about Achaemenid Iran during the Persian Wars. Consequently, they were less interested in the religious landscape of their eastern neighbors and more in political and military aspects. If religious concepts are mentioned, Greek writers often employ the interpretatio graeca, by presenting the Persians as performing "Greek rituals for Greek divinities".

The earliest source is Xanthus of Lydia, who wrote during the mid 5th century BCE. He lived in western Anatolia under Achaemenid rule. Of his work, however, only fragments have survived. The most important account is provided by Herodotus, who wrote shortly after Xanthus. During the 4th century BCE. more information on the religion of Achaemenid Iran become available. These works, however, have mostly survived as quotations only.

== Iranian religions ==
The sources from the Achaemenid era demonstrate the worship of a number of Iranian deities and the presence of Iranian religious concepts. However, connecting these sources to a specific religion, like Zoroastrianism, has been difficult. This is due to the fact that Zoroastrianism is derived from and consequently shares a number of features with those other traditions. There are very few sources on the Ancient Iranian religion but comparisons with the closely related Vedic religion from ancient India show a number of similarities. Such similarities include shared gods like Mithra (ved. Mitra), Airyaman (ved. Aryaman) and Apam Napat as well as religious concepts like Arta (ved. Ṛta), the chanting of manthras (ved. mantra) or the ritual consumption of haoma (ved. soma).

Moreover, even elements not found in the Vedic religion may be pan-Iranian religious innovations independent of Zoroastrianism. One example is Ahura Mazda, who is the supreme god of Zoroastrianism, but is completely absent from the Vedic texts. While scholars like Kreyenbroek therefore see him as a religious innovation of Zarathustra, others like Kuiper maintain that he was an early, pan-Iranian innovation independent of Zarathustra. A similar debate concerns the daevas, who are malevolent beings in Zoroastrianism, but are the regular gods of the Vedic pantheon.

=== Achaemenid kings ===
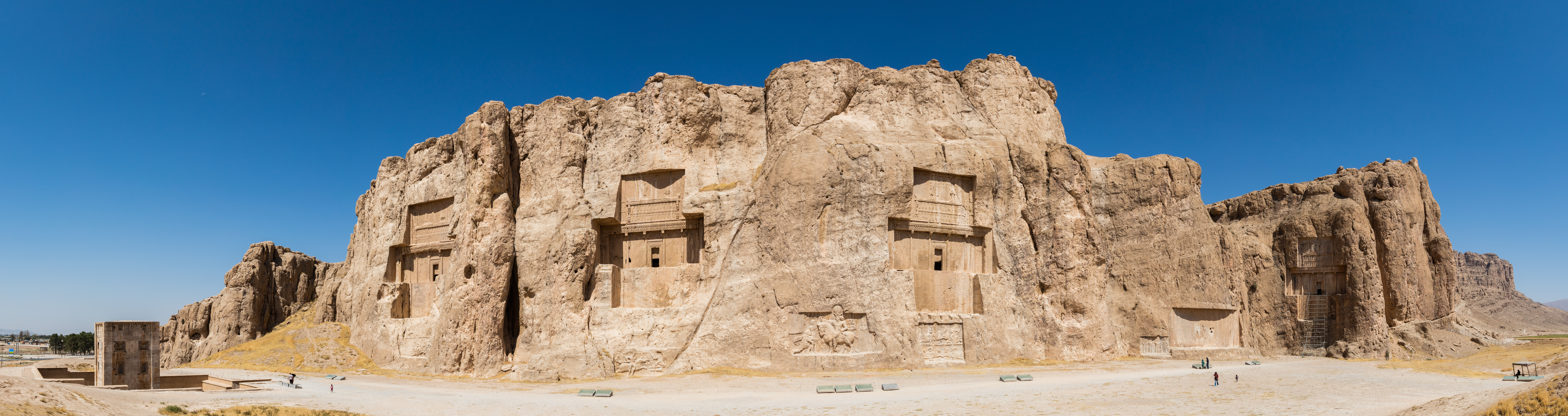
A panorama of the Naqsh-e Rostam mountain complex, containing from left to right the tombs of Darius II, Artaxerxes II, Darius the Great and Xerxes I

Due to the aforementioned problems, there is no consensus if the religious proclamations of the Achaemenid kings represent a form of Zoroastrianism or an independent Iranian religion with similar features. As a result, some scholars use the term Mazdaism as a placeholder for the otherwise unspecified religion of the (early) Achaemenid kings, whereas others reject this concept and use Mazdaism simply as a synonym for Zoroastrianism.

Proponents of a non-Zoroastrian interpretation of the Achaemenid inscriptions typically argue based on missing and misaligned elements in their inscriptions and practices when compared to the Avesta, i.e., the normative collection of Zoroastrian texts. A missing element is, e.g., the total lack of Zarathustra's name in the Achaemenid inscriptions. Moreover, an often discussed misaligned element are the funerary practices of the Achaemenid kings. Since the Avesta mandates open-air excarnation, the Achaemenid practice of rock tombs like Naqsh-e Rostam has been used as evidence of a non-Zoroastrian ideology.

=== Zoroastrianism ===
The Farvahar, here on a stele in Persepolis, is a widely used symbol of Zoroastrianism. It originated from the Assyrian winged sun and was adapted during the Achaemenid period.

There is substantial agreement among scholars that at least toward the end of the Achaemenid period, Zoroastrianism was the primary religion of both the Achaemenid kings and their priests, i.e., the Magi. This is based on two main rationales. First, Greek writers like Aristotle, Pseudo Plato or Theopompus – while writing in the 4th century BCE – explicitly state that the priests of the Achaemenids follow the teachings of Zoroaster (Zarathustra). Second, the Zoroastrian calendar is widely assumed to have been introduced sometime during the Achaemenid period.

However, opinions regarding the early kings (Cyrus the Great, Darius the Great, Xerxes) as well as when and why a transition to Zoroastrianism may have happened diverge substantially. Boyce for instance assumes that already Cyrus the Great followed Zoroastrianism, whereas Skjaervo assumes that at least from Darius the Great on they were Zoroastrians. Gershevitch opines that a conversion to Zoroastrianism happened either under Darius the Great or Artaxerxes II. Malandra likewise assumes the reign of Artaxerxes II as the last possible date. Other scholars, however, remain agnostic.

More recently, a number of scholars have criticized this discussion as being based on an essentialist and anachronistic understanding of early Zoroastrianism and its interaction with the religious landscape of the Ancient Near East. Stausberg for example notes that during the Achaemenid period, identity wasn't defined through religious creeds. Kreyenbroek has pointed out how in an oral religious tradition new ideas are interpreted and slowly synthesized inside a pre-existing environment. Moreover, de Jong notes that the Avesta does not present a ready-made model for kingship and therefore highlights the agency of the Achaemenid kings in creating and defining how they presented themselves. Finally, Skjaervø has argued that the assumption of a well-defined Zoroastrian orthodoxy during the Achaemenid period against which specific elements can be compared is elusive.

Proponents of a Zoroastrian interpretation have also countered criticism in a number of ways. First, they argue that the absence of Zarathustra's name is an argument from silence and point to the fact that his name is also missing in all official announcements of later Iranian dynasties. Moreover, Xanthus of Lydia - who wrote in the mid-5th century BCE - is quoted by Diogenes Laertius as saying that Zarathustra was the first of the Magi. Regarding the royal tombs, proponents of a Zoroastrian interpretation likewise point to the fact that all later Iranian dynasties used similar funeral practices, and that a number of their features can indeed be interpreted as an attempt to conform to Zoroastrian purity rules.

Moreover, proponents of a Zoroastrian interpretation highlight the general agreement between the main themes expressed in the royal inscriptions and the Avesta. Examples are the primacy of Ahura Mazda, the importance of Mithra and Anahita, the rejection of the daevas, the opposition between Good and Evil, the presentation of the Lie (drauga) as an active agent, as well as the so called Zitatnamen of the kings. In addition, they highlight several distinctively Zoroastrian features already connected to the Magi in the earlier sources, i.e., during the 5th century BCE. Examples are practices like Xwedodah, the killing of Xrafstar, open-air excarnation, as well as the veneration of Spenta Armaiti documented both in the Persepolis tablets and the Elephantine papyri.

=== Oxus ===
Oxus is an Iranian deity not known from the Avesta and, therefore, likely represents a non-Zoroastrian, Iranian religious tradition. The earliest textual evidence of the worship of Oxus, dated to the Achaemenid period, are personal names attested in Aramaic texts from Bactria from the fourth century BCE, such as Vaxšu-bandaka ("slave of Oxus" or "servant of Oxus"), Vaxšu-data ("created by Oxus") and Vaxšu-abra-data ("given by the clouds of Oxus"). Further examples occur in Hellenistic sources, for example Oxybazos ("strong through Oxus"), Oxydates ("given by Oxus"), Mithroaxos ("[given by] Mithra and Oxus") and possibly Oxyartes (if the translation "protected by Oxus" is accepted).

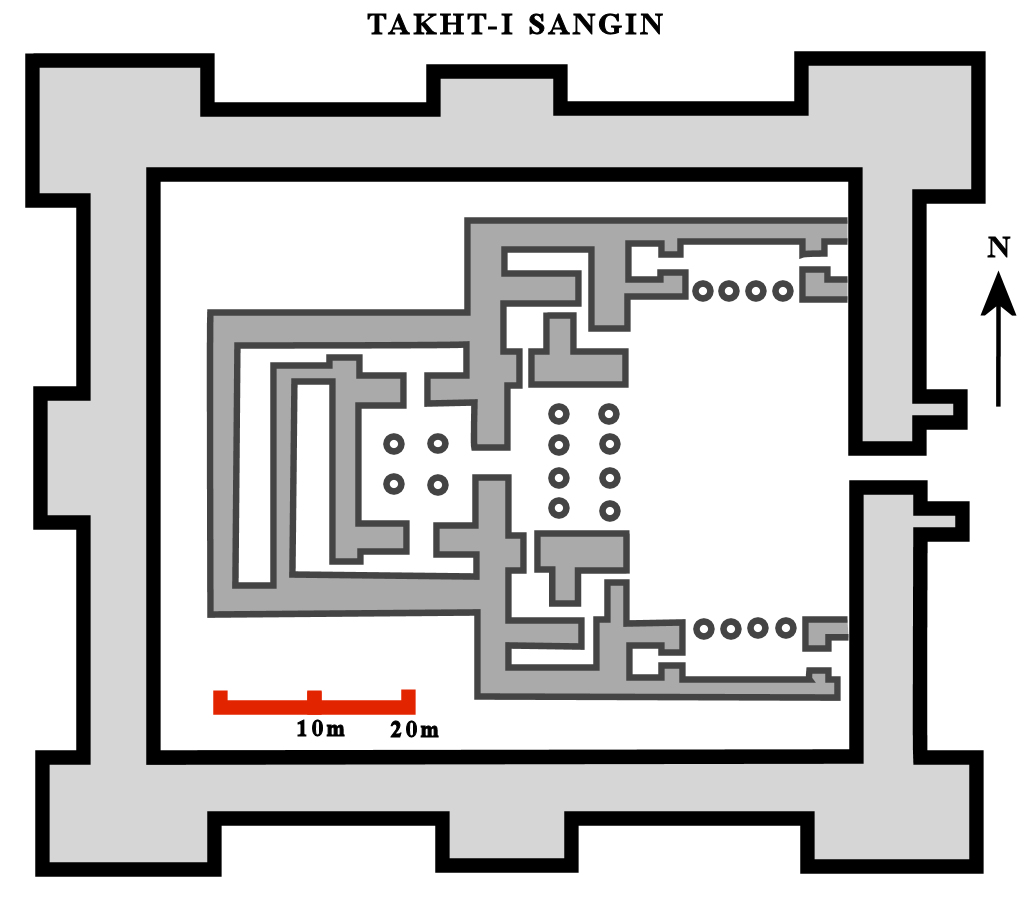
A plan of the temple of Oxus excavated in Takht-i Sangin.

In Takht-i Sangin a temple dedicated to Oxus has been discovered. According to a number of Muslim geographers from the ninth and tenth centuries, this area was customarily considered the beginning of Jayhun (Oxus), which might constitute a survival of an originally Bactrian tradition responsible for the selection of this location as a cult center of the related river god. Excavations indicate that the temple was originally founded in the early Seleucid period, and remained in use until the reign of the Kushan king Huvishka. One of the objects from this site is a stone altar following Greek artistic conventions inscribed with a dedication of a certain Atrosokes to Oxus. His name is Bactrian and can be translated as "burning with sacred fire", and it is possible that he was a priest. Further excavations revealed three more similar Greek inscriptions, seemingly left behind by Bactrian worshipers of Oxus.

A seal with a human-headed bull from the Oxus Treasure is inscribed with Oxus' name written in the Aramaic script. It has been pointed out that the objects found in the temple of Oxus in Takht-i Sangin have close parallels among these belonging to the Oxus Treasure, which might indicate the latter was originally found in the same location. It has been suggested that priests of Oxus hid a number of objects out of fear of looting during a period of increased activity of the Yuezhi in the second half of the second century BCE, but failed to recover them, leaving the Oxus Treasure to only be discovered some two thousand years later.

== Near Eastern religions ==
=== Elamite religion ===
In the Persepolis fortification archive, Humban appears more commonly than any other Elamite or Iranian deity, with a total of twenty six mentions (for comparison, Ahura Mazda appears only ten times). It has been argued that in this period, he should be regarded as a Persian god, rather than a strictly Elamite one. Overall he received the most offerings of all deities attested in textual sources. The amount of grain offered to him by the Achaemenid administration was more than thrice as big as that offered to Ahura Mazda. Offerings to him are designated as bakadaušiyam in multiple cases. This term, while Elamite, is a loan from Old Persian, and can be translated as "(feast) of the offering to (a) god". It accordingly likely designated a public feast. Similar celebrations are attested only for a small number of other deities. Henkelman suggests that the references to bakadaušiyam of Humban are therefore likely to reflect his popularity and status as a royal god. most locations where Humban was worshiped in the Achemenid period were towns located close to the royal road network.

Humban could be called rišar nappipir, "greatest of the gods" or "great among the gods", though this epithet was also applied to Inshushinak. An inscription of Hanni of Ayapir calls him rišar nappirra, "greatest god". Another of his epithets might have been elume, possibly a loan from Akkadian elû ("high", "exalted"), but it is unclear if a passage in which it is attested should be interpreted as referring to the god as "Humban the Exalted", or if it instead denotes the location of his temple.

Humban's supremacy over other gods could be acknowledged in temples not dedicated to him, for example it is presumed that the Ayapir sanctuary from which the rišar nappirra epithet is known was most likely dedicated to the local god Tirutur, rather tha Humban.

=== Ancient Mesopotamian religion ===
==== Anu ====
Xerxes' retaliation against the clergy of Uruk resulted in the collapse of Eanna as the center of Uruk's religious life and economy, and made the creation of a new system centered on the worship of Anu and his spouse of Antu, rather than Ishtar and Nanaya, possible.

==== Antu ====
A change in Antu's status in Uruk occurred over the course of the Achaemenid and Seleucid periods, when she was elevated to the position of one of the lead deities of the city alongside Anu. She came to be worshiped alongside him in a newly built temple, Bīt Rēš. Its ceremonial name can be translated as "foremost temple". Antu's cella in it was known as Egašananna, "house of the lady of heaven". One of its chambers was also designated as her bedroom, and was referred to with the ceremonial name Enir, possibly to be understood as Eanir (Akkadian bīt tānēḫi), "house of weariness". According to Andrew R. George and Paul-Alain Beaulieu, Bīt Rēš might have developed from the É.SAG, a sanctuary of Lugalbanda attested in earlier periods whose name was written with the same signs, but this remains hypothetical. Its establishment marked the first time in the history of Uruk when Eanna was not its main temple.This development was a result of the rise of new priestly families in the aftermath of failed revolts which took place in 484 BCE and Xerxes I's retaliation against the participants. The status of the city's former tutelary deity, Ishtar, declined, and some of her attributes were absorbed by Antu. For example, in the text MLC 1890 Ninsianna, the personification of the planet Venus, who in earlier periods could be treated as a form of Ishtar, is instead treated as an epithet of Antu. The kalû clergy of Uruk, responsible for Emesal prayers and formerly associated with Ishtar, came to be linked to the cult of Anu and Antu instead in Seleucid times. In some cases, the change makes it possible to date individual texts with no other direct indication of their age than their authors being a kalû in service of one of these deities. It is not certain if Seleucid kings were involved in the worship of Antu and other deities of Uruk, though it has been argued that the attested building and renovation projects required royal support.

=== Sumerian religion ===
After the reorganization of the pantheon of Uruk around Anu and Antu in the Achaemenid and Seleucid periods, Nanaya continued to be worshipped and she is attested as one of the deities whose statues were paraded in Uruk in a ritual procession accompanying Ishtar (rather than Antu) during a New Year celebration. The scale of her popular cult in Uruk grew considerably through Seleucid times.

== See also ==
- Religion in the Parthian Empire
- Religion in the Sasanian Empire
