= Minority religion =

Religion held by a minority of the population of a country, state, or region

A minority religion is a religion held by a minority of the population of state or which is otherwise politically marginalized. Minority religions may be subject to stigma or discrimination. An example of a stigma is using the term cult with its extremely negative connotations for certain new religious movements. People who belong to a minority religion may be subject to discrimination and prejudice, especially when the religious differences correlate with ethnic differences.

Laws are made in some countries to protect the rights of religious minorities, such as protecting the minorities' culture and to promote harmony with the majority.

Example of minority religions:

Yazidism

Druze

== See also ==
- Minority group
- Religious minorities in Greece
- Religious minorities in India
- Religious minorities in Iran
- Religious minorities in Iraq
- Religious minorities in Pakistan
- Religious minorities in Turkey
