= Religion in the Sasanian Empire =

Aspect of ancient Iranian society

Religion in the Sasanian Empire (Persian: دین در دوران ساسانی ) refers to events related to religion during the Sasanian Empire from 224 to 651 CE. While the official and most common religion in Iran during this time was Zoroastrianism, many other religions like Christianity and Manichaeism were also significant to Sasanian society.

== Zoroastrianism ==
The Faravahar, a prominent Zoroastrian symbol

Zoroastrianism was the state religion of the Sasanian Empire, who used it as a legitimizing and unifying ideal. They formalized an orthodox variety of Zoroastrianism, which had fragmented into many regional varieties during the Parthian era, and promoted it within their empire.

The Sasanians standardized religious policies and practices laid out in the Avesta and made developments in the religion, for example the creation of the Avestan script and the lighting of two of the Three Great Fires, which led to a flourishing of Zoroastrian culture within and beyond the empire.

Zurvanism and Mazdakism are two offshoots of Zoroastrianism which arose during the Sasanian Empire.

=== Zurvanism ===
Zurvanism was a major branch of Zoroastrianism which arose during the Sasanian Empire. It is of unknown origin, but enjoyed Sasanian royal sanction and is theorized to have been the official state religion of the Sasanians.

In Zurvanism, Ahura Mazda is not seen as the highest deity and creator god (as in standard Zoroastrianism), but rather one of two equal-but opposite divinities (the other being Angra Mainyu) under the supremacy of the god Zurvan, who is perceived as a transcendental and neutral god for whom there was no distinction between good and evil. Zurvanism is also known as "Zurvanite Zoroastrianism."

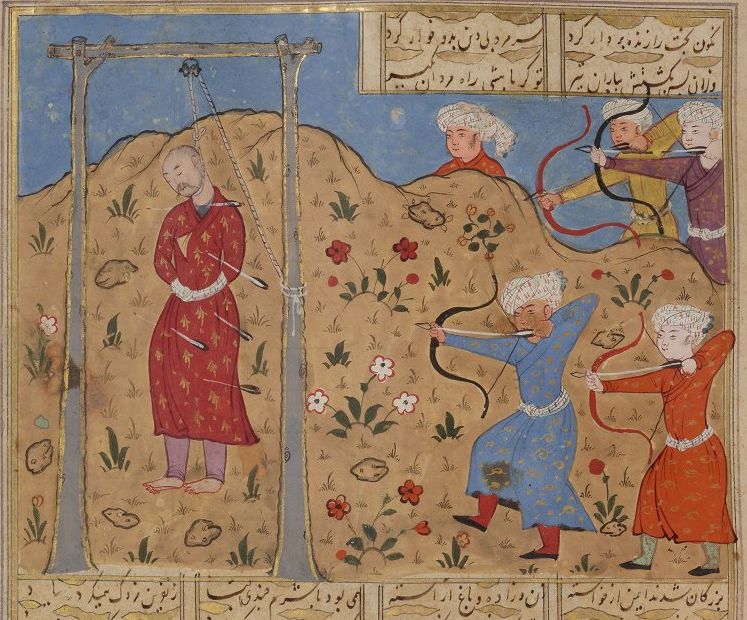
The execution of Mazdak, the namesake of Mazdakism

Zurvanism started to decline after the fall of the Sasanian empire and had entirely disappeared by the 10th century.

=== Mazdakism ===
Mazdakism was another branch of Zoroastrianism which arose during the Sasanian Empire. It was founded by the Zoroastrian mobad Zaradust-e Khuragen but is named after Mazdak, a powerful mobad who its most prominent advocate.

The Mazdak movement was nonviolent and called for the sharing of wealth, women and property, sometimes compared to communism by academics. It consisted of theological teachings and advocated for political and social reforms, such as the distribution of the royal granaries. It was used by the Sasanian emperor Kavadh I to curb the power of the nobility and clergy during his first reign.

== Christianity ==
Christianity was a religious minority in the Sasanian Empire, having spread there during the Parthian era. Sasanian Christians were sometimes persecuted on account of the religious tensions between Christianity and Zoroastrianism. These persecutions became more common after Christianity became the official religion of the Sasanian's main rival, the Roman Empire (and later Byzantine Empire). However, Christians were mainly tolerated by the Sasanians and helped contribute to Sasanian society. The primary branch of Christianity within the Sasanian Empire was the Church of the East, which was founded in Iran at the Council of Seleucia-Ctesiphon in 410.

== Manichaeism ==
It appears from various accounts that the second Sassanian king, Shapur I, was tolerant of foreign religions and ideas. Mani appeared during Shapur's time and reached Shapur's presence and was allowed to spread his religion. The spread of the sect of Shi'ism in Sassanian lands, which had a long-lasting effect, was due to this spirit of tolerance, which was undoubtedly not to Kartir's advantage.

The third Sassanian king, Hormizd I, also supported Mani Nazar and protected him from the persecution of opponents in his palace in Babylon. He also showed interest in Kartir, Mani's enemy, and even gave him the hat and waistcoat that were signs of nobility, placing him in the ranks of the great men of the time.

== Anahita ==
=== Temple of Anahita, Bishapur ===
The Temple of Anahita in Bishapur, located in the city of Kazerun. This building was built in the third century AD by order of Shapur I, the Sassanid king.

=== Temple of Anahita, Kangavar ===
Temple of Anahita, Kangavar, Originally, 200 BCE was proposed as the date of the site's construction. "Under the Parthians any observable western influence can just as well be a survival from the Hellenistic period, which is why the monument at Kangāvar was once acceptably dated as early Parthian while recent investigations proved it to be late Sasanian."

== See also ==
- Religion in the Achaemenid Empire
- Religion in the Parthian era
