= Prods Oktor Skjaervo =

Norwegian-American Iranologist

Prods Oktor Skjærvø
- Born: Steinkjer, Norway
- Occupation: Aga Khan Professor of Iranian Studies (Emeritus) at Harvard University

Academic background
- Education: Johannes Gutenberg University Mainz (Dr. habil.); University of Oslo (Ph.D.); University of Copenhagen (M.A.); University of Oslo (B.A.)
- Alma mater: University of Oslo
- Thesis: The Paikuli Inscription: Restoration and Interpretation. Pt. 1: Restored Text and Translation (109 pp.). Pt. 2: Introduction and Commentary (1981)

Academic work
- Main interests: Iranian studies, linguistics
- Notable works: The Spirit of Zoroastrianism; An Introduction to Old Persian

Prods Oktor Skjærvø (sometimes written P.O. Skjaervo in English) is Emeritus Professor of Iranian Studies in the Department of Near Eastern Languages and Civilizations at Harvard University, where he succeeded Richard Frye as Aga Khan Professor of Iranian Studies.

Born in Steinkjer, Norway, Skjærvø is a hyperpolyglot, familiar with historical and living languages including Old Norse, Norwegian, English, French, German, Italian, Spanish, Russian, Latin, Larestani, Kumzari, Bashkardi, Pashto, Yidgha, Yaghnobi, Munji, Old Khotanese, Avestan, Old Persian, Pahlavi, Manichean Middle Persian, Parthian, Sogdian, Khotanese, New Persian, Ossetic, Kurdish, Tokharian, Vedic, and Classical Sanskrit.

== Education ==
In 1963 Skjærvø enrolled at the University of Oslo where he studied French, Latin, and Sanskrit, with a semester in 1965 at the Sorbonne in Paris. He earned his B.A. (candidatus magisterii) in 1970. In 1974 he completed his M.A. with the thesis, Undersøkelser til verbalsystemet i gammelpersisk og vastly middeliransk (Investigations into the verbal systems of Old Persian and Western Middle Iranian), on which he subsequently based his “Remarks on the Old Persian Verbal System.” He then completed his Ph. D. in 1981 from the University of Oslo with the dissertation, The Paikuli Inscription, Restoration and Interpretation. Pt. 1: Restored Text and Translation (109 pp.). Pt 2: Introduction and Commentary.

A list of ligatures in the Avestan script according to Skjærvø (2003)

== Chairs and Committees ==
Skjærvø served in several academic positions at Harvard including:

- Chair, Committee for Inner Asian and Altaic Studies, 1993–2000
- Chair, Department of Sanskrit, 1995–1996
- Chair, Department of Near Eastern Languages and Civilisations, 2002–2006 and 2009

He has also been invited as:

- Guest lecturer, Eötvös Loránd Tudomány University, Budapest, 1997
- Guest lecturer, Université de la Sorbonne, Paris
- Guest lecturer, Università di Studi di Roma, La Sapienza
- Visiting professor, Collège de France, Paris, May–June 2000

Skjærvø is also a Consulting Editor for Encyclopædia Iranica.

== Selected books ==
Skjærvø has been published widely in several languages:

=== English ===
- Skjærvø, Prods Oktor (2016). An Introduction to Old Persian.
- Skjærvø, Prods Oktor (2012). The Spirit of Zoroastrianism. New Haven, CT: Yale University Press. ISBN 9780300170351.
- Skjærvø, Prods Oktor (2004). This Most Excellent Shine of Gold, King of Kings of Sutras. The Khotanese Suvarṇabhāsottamasūtra, Sources of Oriental languages and literature 60-61, Central Asian sources 5-6. Cambridge, MA: Harvard University, Department of Near Eastern Languages and Civilizations.
- Skjærvø, Prods Oktor; Ursula Sims-Williams (contributor) (2002). Khotanese Manuscripts from Chinese Turkestan in The British Library. A Complete Catalogue with Texts and Translations (Corpus Inscriptionum Iranicarum II/V, Texts VI). London: The British Library.
- Humbach, Helmut; Josef Horblit Elfenbein; Prods Oktor Skjærvø (1991). The Gathas of Zarathustra: and the other Old Avestan Texts. C. Winter. ISBN 978-3825344733.
- Humbach, Helmut; Prods Oktor Skjærvø (1983). The Sassanian Inscription of Paikuli: 3.1. Restored Text and Translation; 3.2. Commentary. Reichert. ISBN 978-3-88226-156-1.
- skjærvø, prods Oktor. "Marriage in Zoroastrianism." Encyclopaedia iranica. Published January 30, 2013.

=== Norwegian ===
- Thomassen, Einar; Prods Oktor Skjærvø (2011). Manikeiske skrifter. Transliterates. (Verdens hellige skrifter). Oslo: Bokklubben.
- Skjærvø, Prods Oktor (2003). Zarathustras sanger. De eldste iranske skriftene. (Verdens hellige skrifter). Oslo: De norske bokklubbene.
