= Religion in the Parthian Empire =

Aspect of ancient Iranian society

The characteristics of religion for the Iranians of the Parthian Empire (founded in 247 BC - collapsed in 224 AD), like many other social and economic issues of that era, have not yet been clarified despite ongoing studies by archaeologists. It seems that the Parthians initially worshiped natural elements such as the sun, moon, and stars. The Parthians did not convert to a specific religion after entering Iran.

== Mazdaism religions ==
=== Mithra worship ===
After the fall of the Achaemenids to Alexander the Great in 330 BC, much of Iran came under the control of the Greco-Macedonian Seleucid dynasty, during which time Greek influence was felt in these areas. The Seleucid kings repeatedly associated themselves with the image of the solar god Helios, which in their eastern possessions may reflect a desire to appropriate the image of local solar deities, including Mithras, and the legitimacy this conferred on the rulers in the eyes of their non-Greek subjects.

The eastern regions of the Seleucid Empire then gradually came under the control of the Iranian-speaking Arsacid Parthian dynasty from the second half of the 2nd century BC. The cult of Mithras is very poorly documented in this context, but it is clearly present and important in the Parthian Empire

Many Parthian kings bears the name Mithridates, formed from the name of the god, indicating the important place the god occupied in the official pantheon of the Arsacid dynasty.

In official iconography of the Parthian period, Mithras would take on the features of Apollo, on a coin from Susa that seems to represent him, dating from the reign of Artabanus II (12-38/40 AD). Before him is a kneeling Parthian king. This scene is echoed in a speech by King Tiridates I of Armenia, a descendant of the Arsacids, to the Roman emperor Nero, narrated by Cassius Dio, in which the Armenian king mentions the fact that as a member of his dynasty he usually prostrated himself only before Mithras (and that he was prepared to make the exception of bowing before the Roman emperor).

The popularity of the god in the Parthian Empire is also demonstrated by the presence of numerous personal names composed of the name Mithras in administrative excavations discovered at the site of ancient Nisa, Turkmenistan.

=== Aramazd ===
The Encyclopædia Iranica says that Aramazd was worshipped in Armenia during the Parthian era.

== Temples in Parthian Empire ==
=== Temple of Adonis, Dura-Europos ===
The temple complex was the last great temple of the city to be built under Parthian rule (113 BC – AD 165). It consists of a number of buildings grouped around a courtyard. It takes up half an insula (city block), with the surrounding residential buildings forming the boundaries of the temenos. Several different rooms with benches on all the walls were grouped around the courtyard. On the north side, there was a portico with two columns. Two reliefs were found here, one depicting either Atargatis or Tyche, and the other of the god Arsu riding a camel.

=== Temple of Anahita, Kangavar ===
Consequently, it has been commonly believed that the site was a "columnar temple dedicated to Anahit." Karim Pirnia, one of the proponents of this theory, believes that the construction belongs to the Parthian style, which underwent renovations in the Sasanian era. Warwick Ball considers the structure "one of the greatest works of Parthian architecture" which has an "eastern Roman Temple form", with the architectural emphasis being on the temenos. As with Arthur Upham Pope (1965, 1971), Ball (2001) also agrees that the temple architecturally "recalls Achaemenid traditions". These and a number of other scholars continue to examine the site as being possibly attributed to the deity Anahita.

== Ruler worship ==
Parthian art indicates that the Arsacid kings considered themselves gods; this ruler worship was perhaps the most widespread.

== Sumerian religion ==
In general, the Parthians allowed the old traditions to continue to live in parts of their empire. There was no Parthian religious mission. In Dura-Europos, the worship of Syrian gods in particular continued. In Susa, Nanaya remained the main goddess. It is known from various sources, such as the Talmud, that Judaism played an important role in the empire.

== Ancient Mesopotamian religion ==
=== Shamash ===
In the Parthian period, Hatra came to be seen as a cult center of the Shamash, and according to Manfred Krebernik its importance can be compared to Sippar and Larsa in earlier times.

=== Anu ===
While it is assumed that religious activity in Uruk continued through the late Seleucid and early Parthian periods, a large part of the Bīt Rēš complex was eventually destroyed by a fire. It was rebuilt as a fortress, and while a small temple was built next to it in the Parthian period, most likely Mesopotamian deities were no longer worshipped there.

=== Gareus ===
According to a Greek inscription dated to 111 CE, the deity worshipped in Uruk in the early first millennium was apparently otherwise unknown Gareus, whose temple was built during the reign of Vologases I of Parthia in a foreign style resembling Roman buildings. The final cuneiform text from the site is an astronomical tablet dated to 79 or 80 CE, possibly the last cuneiform text written in antiquity. It is assumed that the last remnants of the local religion and culture of Uruk disappeared by the time of the Sasanian conquest of Mesopotamia, even though the worship of individual deities might have outlasted cuneiform writing.

== Elymais Religion ==
The religion was polytheistic, but with influences from Mesopotamian and Persian traditions. Their religious practices included temple worship and sacrifice.

== Hatra Religion ==
Various gods were honored in the kingdom, including those of Sumero-Akkadian, Greek, Aramean, an Arabian religions.

== Bardaisanites ==
The followers of Bardaisan (the Bardaisanites) continued his teachings in a sect of the 2nd century deemed heretical by later Christians. Bardaisan's son, Harmonius, is considered to have strayed farther from the path of orthodoxy. Educated at Athens, he added to the Babylonian astrology of his father Greek ideas concerning the soul, the birth and destruction of bodies and a sort of metempsychosis.

A certain Marinus, a follower of Bardaisan and a dualist, who is addressed in the "Dialogue of Adamantius", held the doctrine of a twofold primeval being; for the devil, according to him is not created by God. He was also a Docetist, as he denied Christ's birth of a woman. Bardaisan's form of gnosticism influenced Manichaeism.

Ephrem the Syrian's zealous efforts to suppress this powerful heresy were not entirely successful. Rabbula, Bishop of Edessa in 431–432, found it flourishing everywhere. Its existence in the seventh century is attested by Jacob of Edessa; in the eighth by George, Bishop of the Arabs; in the tenth by the historian al-Masudi; and even in the twelfth by al-Shahrastani. Bardaisanism seems to have merged first into Valentinianism and then into common Manichaeism.

== Church of the East ==
Having its origins in Mesopotamia during the time of the Parthian Empire, the Church of the East developed its own unique form of Christian theology and liturgy. During the early modern period, a series of schisms gave rise to rival patriarchates, sometimes two, sometimes three.

== See also ==
- Religion in the Achaemenid Empire
- Religion in the Sasanian Empire
