= Saeed Abedini =

Iranian American Christian pastor

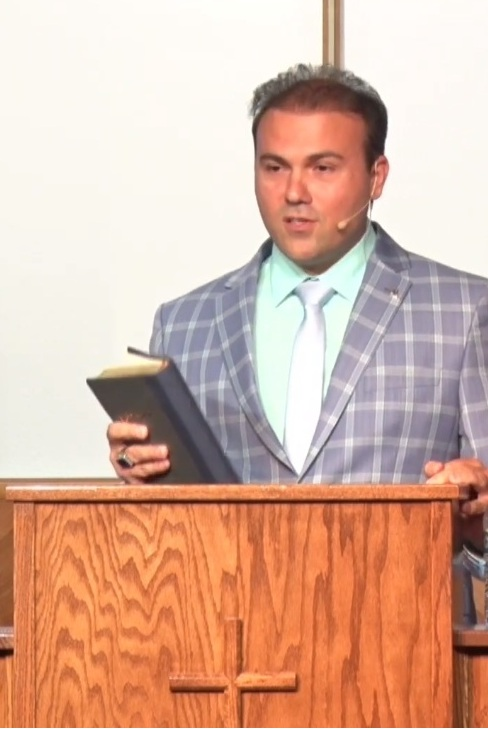
- Saeed Abedini talking on the persecution of Christians in Iran at Persian Worshipers of Christ Church, California, on 30 April 2019
- Born: 7 May 1980 (age 46); Tehran, Iran
- Known for: Imprisonment in Iran
- Spouse: Naghmeh Panahi (m. 2004; div. 2017)
- Children: 3

Saeed Abedini (Persian: سعيد عابدينی, born 7 May 1980) is an Iranian American Christian pastor who was imprisoned in Iran in 2012 based on allegations that he compromised national security. During his imprisonment, Abedini became internationally known as a victim of religious persecution. Following international pressure, along with other American prisoners, Abedini was released from prison on 16 January 2016.

After his release, Abedini and his wife, Naghmeh, divorced. She has accused him of years of domestic abuse. He has denied all allegations against him.

== Background ==
Born in Iran, Abedini is a former Shia Muslim who converted to Christianity in 2000. While Christianity is recognized as a minority religion under the Iranian constitution, Shiʿite converts to Christianity suffer discrimination at the hands of Iranian authorities. In particular, such converts are disallowed from worshiping with other Christians in established Christian churches, which has led to the establishment of so-called "house" or "underground" churches where these converts can worship together.

In the early 2000s, Abedini and his wife Naghmeh became prominent in the house-church movement in Iran when the Iranian government tolerated the movement. During this period, Abedini is credited with establishing about 100 house churches in 30 Iranian cities with more than 2,000 members. With the election of Mahmoud Ahmedinejad in 2005, however, the house-church movement was subjected to a crackdown by Iranian authorities and the Abedinis moved back to the United States.

In 2008, Abedini became an ordained minister in the U.S. In 2010, he was granted American citizenship, thus becoming a dual Iranian-American citizen. Abedini lived with his family in Boise, Idaho, where his wife grew up.

Abedini's first trip back to Iran was in 2009 to visit his extended family, when government authorities detained him. According to Abedini, he was threatened with death during his interrogation over his conversion to Christianity. Ultimately, he was released after signing a pledge to cease all house-church activities in the country. As part of this same agreement, Abedini was permitted to return to Iran freely to work on non-sectarian humanitarian efforts.

== Iranian detention ==
=== 2012 arrest in Iran ===
In July 2012, after making his ninth trip to Iran since 2009 to visit his relatives and continue to build an orphanage in the city of Rasht, Abedini was placed under house arrest by the Islamic Revolutionary Guard Corps; his passports were confiscated. He was transferred to Evin Prison in late September.

=== Prosecution, trial, and sentencing ===
In mid-January 2013, it was reported that Abedini would go on trial on 21 January and could face the death penalty. He was charged with compromising national security, though the specific allegations were not made public. His supporters said his arrest was due to his conversion and attending peaceful Christianity gatherings in Iran. On 21 January 2013, Iranian state media reported that Abedini would be released after posting a $116,000 bond. His wife, however, stated that the government "has no intention of freeing him and that the announcement is 'a game to silence' international media reports."

On 27 January 2013, following a trial, Judge Pir-Abassi sentenced Abedini to eight years in prison. According to Fox News, Abedini was sentenced for having "undermined the Iranian government by creating a network of Christian house churches and ... attempting to sway Iranian youth away from Islam." The evidence against Abedini was based primarily on his activities in the early 2000s. Abedini was meant to serve his time in Evin Prison.

In early November 2013, Abedini was transferred from Tehran to the Rajai Shahr prison in the town of Karaj, which was populated with heavy criminals and was known for placing prisoners in harsh (and sometimes life-threatening) conditions.

=== Calls for release ===
In January 2013, U.S. State Department condemned Abedini's sentencing: "We condemn Iran's continued violation of the universal right of freedom of religion, and we call on the Iranian authorities to respect Mr. Abedini's human rights and release him."

Amnesty International repeatedly raised the issue of Abedini's imprisonment, calling him a prisoner of conscience and calling upon Iran to release all those detained for peacefully exercising their rights to freedom of expression, association, and assembly.

In May 2015, the United States Senate unanimously passed, 90–0, a resolution calling upon the Iranian government to immediately free Abedini and two other Americans imprisoned in Iran, Amir Hekmati and Jason Rezaian, and to cooperate with the U.S. government to locate and return Robert Levinson, who is missing in the country. The resolution was introduced by Senator James Risch of Idaho, Abedini's home state.

In March 2015, in a message commemorating the Nowruz (the Persian new year), President Barack Obama listed Abedini, Rezaian, and Hekmati, by name and called for their release. Obama said, "[Abedini] has spent two and a half years detained in Iran on charges related to his religious beliefs. He must be returned to his wife and two young children, who needlessly continue to grow up without their father." Obama also met with Naghmeh Abedini during a January 2015 visit to Boise.

In July 2015, in a speech to the Veterans of Foreign Wars, Obama again listed Abedini, Rezaian, and Hekmati by name-calling for their release (and for cooperation to find Levinson) and saying, "We are not going to relent until we bring home our Americans who are unjustly detained in Iran." Secretary of State John Kerry said the same month that there was "not one meeting that took place" during the nuclear talks from 2013 to 2015 (which led to the Joint Comprehensive Plan of Action) at which the United States didn't raise the issue of the four Americans.

=== Release ===
On 16 January 2016, Saeed Abedini was released from prison. Iran said they were being swapped for seven Iranians held in US prisons, but there was no immediate US confirmation. "In addition, Iranian state TV said 14 Iranians sought by the US would be removed from an Interpol wanted list." The Washington Post journalist Jason Rezaian, Marine veteran Amir Hekmati and Nosratollah Khosrawi were also released by Iran.

=== Later developments ===
In March 2016, Abedini appeared on The Watchman with Erick Stakelbeck, a pro-Israel TBN show promoting Israeli-American relations.

Abedini has stated that interrogators beat him during his imprisonment in Iran.

In November 2019, a federal court ruled that the Iranian government owed Abedini $47 million to compensate him for the torture he experienced while imprisoned.

== Marriage and accusations of domestic abuse ==
In 2002, Abedini met Naghmeh Panahi, an American citizen, at an Assemblies of God church while she was visiting relatives in Iran. The couple married two years later on June 30, 2004 and resided in Tehran. She alleges, around this time, Abedini started kicking and shoving her, and that, in 2005, he severely beat her in Dubai over a dispute concerning a suitcase. In 2020, Abedini told The Post he hit her in Dubai in self defense. Panahi, pregnant at the time, says she did not report these incidents to authorities in Iran or Dubai, in part, because she feared it would jeopardize Abedini's ability to obtain a U.S. visa. In 2006, the family moved to Boise, Idaho. In 2007, while she was pregnant with their second child, police records show that Abedini grabbed Panahi's neck. He then pled guilty to misdemeanor domestic assault over the incident, and was sentenced to one year of probation, a 90 day suspended jail sentence, and was required to complete anger management classes. In an interview with Christianity Today, Abedini claims, at that time, he was still learning English and that he was of the understanding that the charges had been dismissed. Panahi later hired a lawyer to recant her allegations regarding the 2007 incident; she has since claimed she did this to prevent Abedini from being deported and to not impede his process of gaining U.S. citizenship, which he did obtain in 2010. Abedini allegedly then vandalized his mother-in-law's car and broke his father-in-law's nose in 2010.

While Abedini was imprisoned in Iran, Panahi adamantly advocated for his release, including giving speeches, attending conferences, media appearances, and speaking at congressional hearings. In 2014, Panahi alleges Abedini used a smuggled phone to verbally abuse her over Skype. She stopped speaking to him by October 2015, and the following month, she stopped campaigning for his release and publicly accused him of "physical, emotional, psychological, and sexual abuse (through Saeed’s addiction to pornography)."

After his release, Panahi initially agreed to reunite with Abedini, but she later decided not to. She was subsequently granted a protection order against him, and on January 26, 2016, Panahi filed for legal separation. Abedini made a statement shortly after thanking his wife for the advocacy she did, acknowledged the marriage had troubles, and downplayed the abuse accusations. He later explicitly denied all allegations of abuse in an interview with Christianity Today. Panahi alleges in May 2016 their eight-year-old son was hospitalized and placed in a neck brace after Abedini grabbed his son by his neck for failing to clean some spilled water. A district court judge then ordered an emergency protection order and a CPS investigation.

Abedini filed for divorce in October 2016, citing irreconcilable differences. The divorce was finalized in April 2017, and a judge granted Panahi full custody of the children. A family court judge described Abedini as a "a habitual perpetrator of domestic violence." Abedini pled guilty in 2017 to violating a restraining order that Panahi had against him and he was arrested in 2018 for violating a no-contact order. In a 2020 interview with The Post, Abedini maintained that the accusations of domestic abuse were false and claims that Panahi has lied for attention and to boost her own ministry pursuits.

== See also ==
- Christianity in Iran
- Evangelism
- Freedom of religion in Iran
- Human rights in Iran
- List of former Muslims
- Youcef Nadarkhani
- List of foreign nationals detained in Iran
- Iran–United States relations during the Obama administration
