= Blasphemy law in Iran =

Iran is a constitutional, Islamic theocracy. Its official religion is the doctrine of the Twelver Jaafari School. Iran's law against blasphemy derives from Sharia. Blasphemers are usually charged with "spreading corruption on earth", or mofsed-e-filarz, which can also be applied to criminal or political crimes. The law against blasphemy complements laws against criticizing the Islamic regime, insulting Islam, and publishing materials that deviate from Islamic standards.

== Constitutional framework ==
According to Article 24 of the Constitution of the Islamic Republic of Iran, "Publications and the press have freedom of expression except when it is detrimental to the fundamental principles of Islam ..."

== Selected cases ==
In 1988, in the United Kingdom, Salman Rushdie published The Satanic Verses, a novel. Muslims in the United Kingdom accused Rushdie of blasphemy. Some Muslims called upon the Crown to prosecute Rushdie but it did not. On 14 February 1989, the Ayatollah Khomeini of Iran issued a fatwa which called for Muslims to kill Rushdie and all publishers of The Satanic Verses. In 1991, Hitoshi Igarashi, the novel's Japanese translator was stabbed to death. Shortly afterward, the Italian translator was stabbed but survived. In 1993, the Norwegian publisher of the book was injured in a gun attack.

In 1999, Iran put on trial for “insulting the Prophet, his descendants, and the Ayatollah Khomeini,” and for other charges, Abdollah Nouri, the former Minister of the Interior in the Rafsanjani and Khatami cabinets. In 1999, Nouri was the publisher of a daily newspaper that discussed the limits on the Supreme Leader's powers, the rights of unorthodox clerics and groups to air their views, the right of women to divorce, and whether laughing and clapping were un-Islamic. On 27 November 1999, the Special Court for the Clergy found Nouri guilty, and sentenced him to five years' imprisonment and a fine. Nouri was released on 5 November 2002.

In 2002, Hashem Aghajari, a member of the Shia majority, a history professor, and a veteran who lost a leg in 1980-88 war against Iraq, gave a speech in which he called for political reforms. The authorities arrested Aghajari, charged him with blasphemy, and jailed him. A court convicted Aghajari, and made death the penalty. In June 2004, the Supreme Court substituted a charge of "insulting religious values" for the blasphemy charge, and imposed a jail term of three years among other penalties. Aghajari was released on bail on 31 July 2004.

In October 2006, Ayatollah Hossein Kazemeyni Boroujerdi, a senior Shia cleric who advocates the separation of religion and state, and a number of his followers were arrested and imprisoned after clashes with riot police. He and seventeen of his followers were initially sentenced to death, but the death sentences were later withdrawn. In August 2007, he was sentenced to one year in prison in Tehran followed by another ten years in prison in another part of the country.

In May 2007, authorities arrested eight students at Tehran's Amir Kabir University. The students were associated with a newspaper which had published articles suggesting that no humans were infallible, including the Prophet Muhammad.

In February 2009, the Iranian government launched a campaign against Mohammad Mojtehed Shabestari, a Shia Muslim cleric, for blasphemy. Shabestari's blasphemy was to say in a speech: "If in a society the three concepts of God, power, and authority are mixed up, a political-religious despotism will find strong roots ... and the people will suffer greatly."

In March 2009, Iranian blogger Omid Mirsayafi died in prison while serving a 30-month sentence for propaganda against the state and criticism of religious leaders. The authorities said Mirsayafi committed suicide.

On 9 June 2009, the singer Mohsen Namjoo was sentenced in absentia to a five-year jail term for ridiculing the Quran in a song. In 2008, Namjoo had apologized for the song, which he claimed was never meant for public release.

On 24 September 2014, a former psychologist Mohsen Amir Aslani was hanged in a prison near the city of Karaj, west of Tehran, where he had been in detention for eight years, for "corruption on earth and heresy in religion". Aslani had taught religious classes; according to authorities, his teachings on the Koran diverged from established interpretations. He was also accused of insulting the Prophet Jonah: he is alleged to have stated that Jonah could not have emerged from the whale.

Iranian journalist Mohammad Mosaed, who "reported extensively on government corruption, embezzlement, economic sanctions, labour and popular protests", was sentenced to four years and nine months in prison in 2021.

In 2023, two men in Iran were executed for blasphemy. The two men, Yousef Mehrad and Sadrollah Fazeli-Zare reportedly ran several online accounts dedicated to spreading atheism. The pair were first arrested in 2020 for running an account on Telegram. The two were then convicted in 2021 on multiple charges of blasphemy and sentenced to death.

=== Aseman newspaper ===
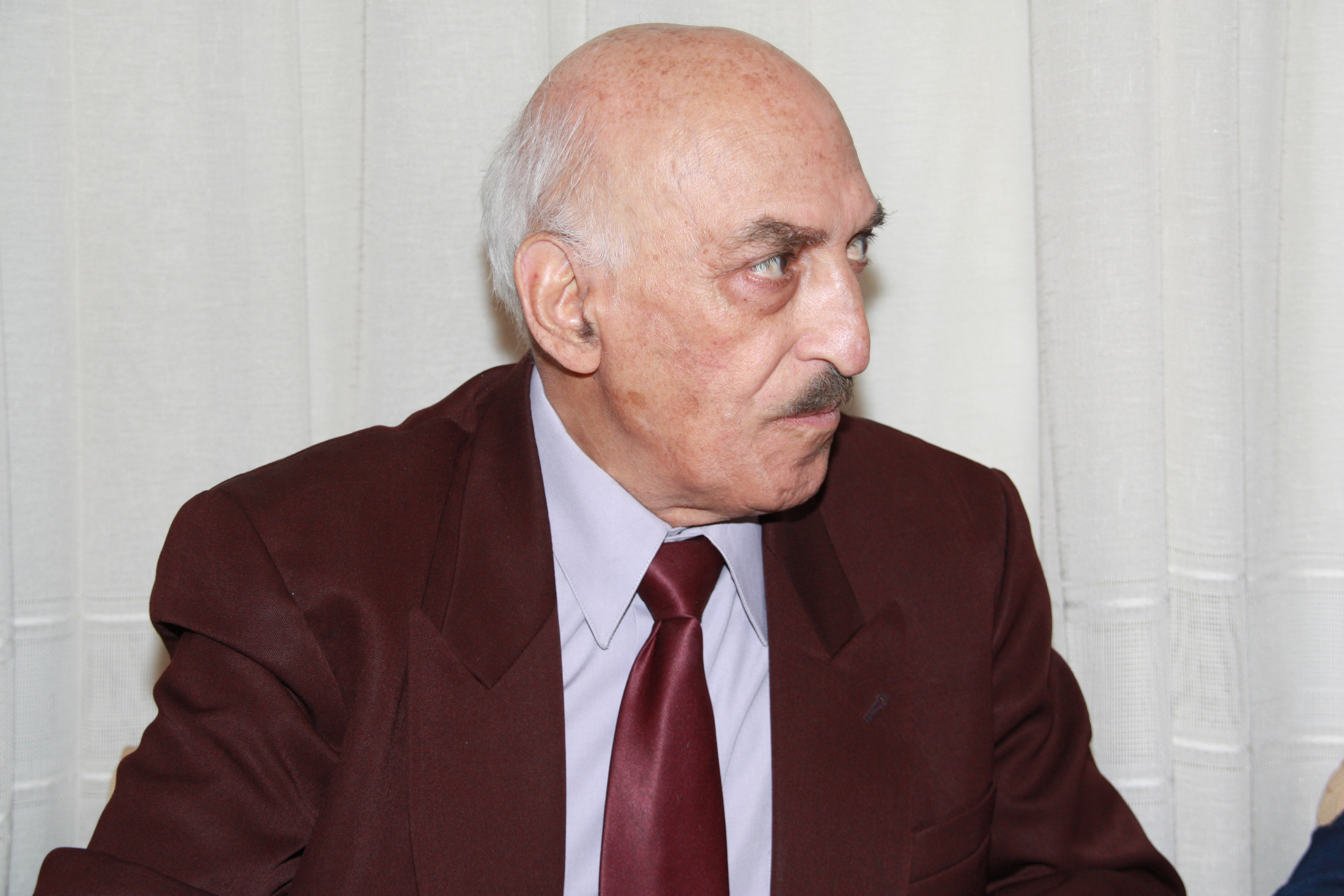
Dr Bavand described eye-for-eye punishment, an Islamic law, as inhumane in an interview with Aseman newspaper.

Aseman ('Sky'), a reformist newspaper was shut after just one week of publication. The closure was done after a professor, Davoud Hermidas-Bavand, described eye-for-an-eye punishment as "inhumane." Aseman was aligned with the country's then-President Hassan Rouhani. Former reformist president, Mohammad Khatami, had endorsed the paper in a letter published in its first edition, saying, "Whenever the space for life tightens; whenever the land dries up and is deprived of water", people "lift their eyes to the sky to keep hope alive."

According to the prosecutor's office, "The newspaper was banned for spreading lies and insulting Islam."

== See also ==
- Apostasy in Islam
- Censorship in Iran
- Political repression in the Islamic Republic of Iran
- Fazel Lankarani
- Freedom of religion in Iran
- Islam and blasphemy
- Islamic Revolutionary Court
- Media of Iran
