= Christianity in Safavid Iran =

Safavid Iran was multi-ethnic and multi-religious. In the 17th century, Christians within the empire consisted primarily of three groups;

- Georgians belonging to the Georgian Orthodox Church
- Armenians belonging to the Armenian Apostolic Church
- Roman Catholics, consisting of European missionaries and recent converts

== See also ==
- Christianity in Iran
- Jesuits in Safavid Iran
- Safavid Georgia
- Erivan Province (Safavid Iran)
- Safavid Karabakh

== Sources ==
- Floor, Willem; Herzig, Edmund, eds. (2012). Iran and the World in the Safavid Age. I.B. Tauris. pp. 1–672. ISBN 978-1780769905.
- Kołodziejczyk, Dariusz (2017). "Christians in the Safavid Empire". In Thomas, David; Chesworth, John A. (eds.). Christian-Muslim Relations. A Bibliographical History. Volume 10 Ottoman and Safavid Empires (1600-1700). BRILL. pp. 21–33. ISBN 978-9004346048.
