= Youcef Nadarkhani =

Iranian Christian pastor

- Born: 1977 (age 48–49); Iran
- Known for: Imprisonment in Iran
- Spouse: Fatemeh 'Tina' Pasandideh
- Children: 2 sons: Daniel (born 2002) and Yoel (born 2004)

Youcef Nadarkhani (born 1977) is an Iranian Christian pastor who was sentenced to death (but later acquitted) in Tehran for being a Christian having been born into Islam.

Initial reports, including a 2010 brief from the Iranian Supreme court, stated that the sentence on Nadarkhani (first name also spelled Yousef, Youssef, or Yousof; last name also spelled Nadar-Khani or Nadar Khani) was based on the crime of apostasy, renouncing his Islamic faith. Government officials later claimed that the sentence was instead based on alleged violent crimes, specifically rape and extortion; however, no formal charges or evidence of violent crimes have been presented in court. According to Amnesty International and Nadarkhani's legal team, the Iranian government had offered leniency if he were to recant his Christianity. His lawyer Mohammad Ali Dadkhah stated that an appeals court upheld his sentence after he refused to renounce his Christian faith and convert to Islam. In early September 2012, Nadarkhani was acquitted of apostasy, but found guilty of evangelizing Muslims, though he was immediately released as having served prison time. However, he was taken back into custody on Christmas Day 2012 and then released shortly afterward on 7 January 2013.

Nadarkhani was again arrested and beaten on 22 July 2018. He was released in February 2023, but faced new charges in July 2023.

== Apostasy Law in Iran ==
After the 1979 Iranian Revolution, Iranian Christians were recognized as a "protected religious minority" and according to the Constitution of Iran possess freedom of religion and even have a Member of Parliament (MP) representing them. However, evangelism and missionary work and converting Muslims to Christianity are prohibited by law. Additionally, Christians and other minority religions are often subject to state-sanctioned discrimination.

In the Islamic Republic of Iran, there is officially no crime known as apostasy in the penal code (although there was a law about it prior to 1994). The last known execution for this crime was in 1990. However, despite there being no official civil law of apostasy, judges may still convict a defendant of that crime if they rule based on religion fatwas. As a result, a few people have been convicted of it, but there have been no known executions. In 2011 a man was executed in Ahvaz, Iran for blasphemy and "spreading corruption on the earth" (Mofsed-Fel-Arz) when he claimed that he was God, and attracting a "following" around himself. According to the fatwas, for a man, if convicted, the punishment is death by hanging—for a woman, it is life imprisonment. The apostate should be given three chances to repent and convert back to Islam.

== Biography ==
Nadarkhani is from Rasht, Gilan Province, in Iran. He originally had no known religion, however, Nadarkhani said that he converted to Christianity as a child having never practiced Islam. However, court documents claim that he converted at age 19. Prior to his arrest, he was the pastor of a network of Christian house churches. He is a member of the Protestant evangelical Church of Iran. He is married to Fatemeh Pasandideh, and they have two sons, ages 9 and 7 (in 2011).

== Initial arrest ==
Nadarkhani was first taken into custody in December 2006, on the charges of apostasy from Islam and evangelism to Muslims. He was released two weeks later, without being charged.

In 2009, Nadarkhani discovered a recent change in Iranian educational policy that required all students, including his children, to take a course in Quran study in school. After he heard about this change, he went to the school and protested, based on the fact that the Iranian constitution guarantees the freedom to practice religion. His protest was reported to the police, who arrested him and brought him before a court on 12 October 2009, on charges of protesting.

On 18 June 2010 Nadarkhani's wife was arrested and charged with apostasy. She was sentenced to life imprisonment, and placed in prison in Lakan, Iran, which is just south of their hometown of Rasht. She was released in October 2010., after serving four months in prison.

== Death sentence ==
The charges against Nadarkhani were later changed to apostasy and evangelism, the same charges he was initially arrested under in 2006. On 21–22 September 2010, Nadarkhani appeared before the 11th Chamber of The Assize Court of the province of Gilan and received a death sentence for the charge of apostasy. Nadarkhani's lawyer, Nasser Sarbaz, claims there were numerous procedural errors during Nadarkhani's trial.

After conviction, Nadarkhani was transferred to a prison for political prisoners, and denied all access to his family and attorney. The delivery of Nadarkhani's written verdict was delayed by Iran's security officials. Iranian officials seemed reluctant to execute Nadarkhani, and kept delaying his sentence. They also gave him several opportunities to convert back to Islam.

On 13 November 2010, the verdict for the trial of 21–22 September was finally delivered in writing, indicating that Nadarkhani would be executed by hanging. The sentence was appealed and the 3rd Chamber of the Supreme Court in Qom upheld the conviction and sentence of death. In July 2011 Mr. Nadarkhani's lawyer, Mr. Mohammad Ali Dadkhah, a prominent Iranian human rights defender, received the written verdict of the Supreme Court of Iran, dated 12 June 2011, which upheld the death sentence. The Supreme Court decision asked the court in Rasht, which issued the original death sentence, to re-examine some procedural flaws in the case, but ultimately gave the local judges the power to decide whether to release, execute or retry Mr. Nadarkhani in October. The recent written verdict included a provision for annulment should Mr. Nadarkhani recant his faith. As of 2011 he was being kept in a security prison in Lakan.

Nadarkhani was acquitted of apostasy at a retrial on 8 September 2012. During proceedings, the court found him guilty of evangelizing Muslims and sentenced him to three years in prison, the time he has already served. He was released and returned to his family.

== International response ==
A number of Western organizations and governments have issued statements in support of the release of Nadarkhani.

On 29 October 2010, the United States Commission on International Religious Freedom asked President Barack Obama to press Iran for Nadarkhani's release. If the execution is carried out, Nadarkhani would be the first Christian executed for religious reasons in Iran in over 20 years.

On 28 September 2011, the Commission on International Religious Freedom stated:

Despite the finding that Mr. Nadarkhani did not convert to Christianity as an adult, the court continues to demand that he recant his faith or otherwise be executed. The most recent court proceedings are not only a sham, but are contrary to Iranian law and international human rights standards, including the International Covenant on Civil and Political Rights, to which Iran is a party.

President Barack Obama's 30 September 2011 statement read:

The United States condemns the conviction of Pastor Youcef Nadarkhani. Pastor Nadarkhani has done nothing more than maintain his devout faith, which is a universal right for all people. That the Iranian authorities would try to force him to renounce that faith violates the religious values they claim to defend, crosses all bounds of decency, and breaches Iran's own international obligations.

On 28 September 2011, British Foreign Secretary William Hague issued a statement condemning the imminent execution, stating

I deplore reports that Pastor Youcef Nadarkhani, an Iranian Church leader, could be executed imminently after refusing an order by the Supreme Court of Iran to recant his faith. This demonstrates the Iranian regime's continued unwillingness to abide by its constitutional and international obligations to respect religious freedom. I pay tribute to the courage shown by Pastor Nadarkhani who has no case to answer and call on the Iranian authorities to overturn his sentence.

Amnesty International designated Nadarkhani a prisoner of conscience and urged his immediate release, stating, "It is shocking that the Iranian authorities would even consider killing a man simply for exercising his right to choose a religion other than Islam."

== Statements of the Iranian government ==
On 1 October 2011 the Iran state media reported that Nadarkhani is facing the death sentence for rape and extortion, not for apostasy and refusing to renounce his religion, as his lawyer, human rights groups and Western news media have reported. They also reported that they had not signed his execution order. Nadarkhani's lawyer said that he believed that Nadarkhani would not be executed.

According to the government Fars News Agency in a 30 September story, Gholamali Rezvani, the Gilan Provincial Political/Security Deputy Governor, stated:

Youcef Nadarkhani has security crimes and he had set up a house of corruption. ... Nobody is executed in our country for choosing a religion, but he has committed security crimes.

He also accused Zionist media of spreading propaganda. In reply, Nadarkhani's lawyer, Mohammad Ali Dadkhah told the International Campaign for Human Rights in Iran:

If he is under trial in another court on other charges, I am not aware. But we only defended him against the death sentence in the case of his charge of apostasy. The charge the court staff announced that I defended during several different court sessions was apostasy and no other charge.

In a ruling from the Iranian Supreme Court, translated into English by the Confederation of Iranian Students, Nadarkhani was sentenced to execution by hanging for, "turning his back on Islam" and "converting Muslims to Christianity." The ruling also alleges that he also participated in Christian worship by holding home church services and baptizing himself and others, effectively breaking Islamic Law. There is no mention in the ruling of rape or extortion allegations.

== Release ==
In early September 2012, Nadarkhani was acquitted of apostasy, sparing him the death penalty. However, he was found guilty of evangelism, but released for having already served his time.

== Re-arrests ==
Youcef Nadarkhani was taken back into custody on Christmas Day 2012. He was released on 7 January 2013.

Iranian state security forces raided Youcef Nadarkhani's home on 22 July 2018. He was beaten, his son was tasered, and Nadarkhani was taken to prison. As of June 2021, Nadarkhani was sentenced to six-years in prison, and his son who is supporting the family is facing military conscription, according to a religious rights website. In February 2023, he was released from prison in a mass amnesty, after having served 5 of 6 years.

== See also ==
- Christianity in Iran
- Evangelism
- Freedom of religion in Iran
- Human rights in the Islamic Republic of Iran
- List of former Muslims
- Saeed Abedini – Iranian American Christian pastor imprisoned in Iran for alleged
