= Freedom of religion in Iran =

Freedom of religion in the Islamic Republic of Iran (IRI) is marked by Iranian culture, major religion and politics. The Constitution of Iran mandates that the official religion of Iran is the Twelver Ja'fari school of Shia Islam, and also mandates that other Islamic schools are to be accorded full respect, and their followers are free to act in accordance with their own jurisprudence in performing their religious rites. The Constitution of Iran stipulates that Zoroastrians, Jews, and Christians are the only recognized religious minorities. The continuous presence of the country's pre-Islamic non-Muslim communities, such as Zoroastrians, Jews, and Christians, had accustomed the population to the participation of non-Muslims in society. However, despite official recognition of such minorities by the IRI government, the actions of the government create a "threatening atmosphere for some religious minorities". Groups reportedly "targeted and prosecuted" by the IRI include Baháʼís, Sufis, apostates from Islam (usually to Christianity), and Muslims who "challenge the prevailing interpretation of Islam". In 2020, the US Commission on International Religious Freedom (ICRC) annual statement described the Islamic Republic as a country of particular concern under international law on religious freedom, and the US State Department included the Islamic Republic among the most egregious violators of religious freedom.

== Religious demography ==
With a population of approximately 87 million, approximately 99.4% of Iran is classified as Muslim (as of 2022). Of these an estimated 90-95% were Shia and 5-10% Sunni (mostly Turkomen, Persians, Arabs, Balochs, and Kurds living in the southwest, southeast, and northwest); although there are no official statistics of the size of the Sufi Muslim population, some reports estimated several million people, while Baháʼís, Christians, Zoroastrians, Mandaeans, and Jews combined constitute approximately one percent of the population.

An independent survey in 2020 showed that Iranians defined themselves as follows; 32% as Shia, 5% Sunni Muslim and 3% Sufi Muslim, as well as 9% atheists, 8% Zoroastrians, 7% spiritual and 1.5% Christian.

== Status of religious freedom ==
The Constitution of the Islamic Republic of Iran states that "the investigation of individuals' beliefs is forbidden" and that "no one may be molested or taken to task simply for holding a certain belief." Five seats in the parliament are reserved for the minority religions; two seats for Armenian Christians, one for Assyrian Christians, one for Jews, and one for Zoroastrians. Iran’s Penal Code has no provisions criminalizing apostasy, as of January 18, 2012.

However, the adherents of religions not specifically protected under the Constitution do not enjoy freedom of activity, nor do Muslims who convert to another religion. Constitutional protections of freedom of belief are tempered by the fact that the death penalty has been imposed on the basis of vague charges, such as “‘attempts against the security of the state,’ ‘outrage against high-ranking officials,’ and ‘insults against the memory of Imam Khomeini and against the Supreme Leader of the Islamic Republic,’” and has been imposed on the basis of crimes like "drug smuggling" that religious (and political) dissidents have no plausible connection with. While there is no specific law against apostasy, courts can hand down the death penalty for apostasy to ex-Muslims, and have done so in previous years, based on their interpretation of Sharia’a law and fatwas (legal opinions or decrees issued by Islamic religious leaders). There are laws against blasphemy and the punishment is death.

Sufis have been sentenced to prison terms for among other charges “establishing and membership in a deviant group.” Ex-Muslim atheists have been harassed. But limits on freedom of religion in the IRI most directly affects adherents of the Baháʼí Faith. The Government regards the Baháʼí community, whose faith originally arose from a movement within Islam, as a misguided or wayward "sect."

In 2004, the Expediency Council approved appending a note to Article 297 of the 1991 Islamic Punishments Act, authorizing collection of equal "blood money" (diyeh) for the death of Muslims and non-Muslims. All women and Baháʼí men were excluded from the equalization provisions of the bill. According to law, Baháʼí blood or anyone' who marries or helps a Baháʼí or gets involved with them is considered mobah, meaning it can be spilled with impunity.

The Government fuels anti-Baháʼí sentiment in the country. Government officials have stated that the Baháʼís are not a religious minority, but a political organization which was associated with the Shah's regime, is against the Iranian Revolution and engages in espionage activities. Nonetheless, government officials have reportedly stated that as individuals, all Baháʼís are entitled to their beliefs and are protected under other articles of the Constitution as citizens. In response to repeated attempts (between 1982 and 1984) by the Iranian representative to the United Nations to convince the United Nations diplomatic community that the Baháʼí Faith is a politicized organization with a record of criminal activism against the Iranian government, the United Nations has stated that there has been no evidence of Iran's claims and that the Baháʼí community in Iran professes its allegiance to the state. The United Nations pointed to the Baháʼí teaching of obedience to the government of one's country and stated that any involvement in any subversive acts against the government would be antithetical to precepts of the Baháʼí religion. The United Nations also stated that if the Iranian government did acknowledge that the Baháʼí Faith is a religion, it would be an admission that freedom of religion does not apply to all in Iran and that it is not abiding by the Universal Declaration of Human Rights and International Covenants on Human Rights to which it is a signatory.

Unlike the Baháʼí Faith, Judaism is a recognized religion in Iran. Despite Iran's official distrust of the country of Israel, the government does not directly attack Judaism itself.

The central feature of the country's Islamic republican system is rule by a "religious jurisconsult." The Supreme Leader of Islamic Republic controls the most important levers of power; he is chosen by a group of 86 religious scholars. All acts of the Majles (legislative body) must be reviewed for conformity with Islamic law and principles by the Council of Guardians, which is composed of six clerics appointed by the Supreme Leader and six Muslim jurists (legal scholars) nominated by the Head of the Judiciary and elected by parliament.

Religious activity is monitored closely by the Ministry of Islamic Culture and Guidance and by the Ministry of Intelligence and Security (MOIS). Adherents of recognized religious minorities are not required to register individually with the Government; however, their community, religious, and cultural events and organizations, including schools, are monitored closely. Registration of Baháʼís is a police function. Evangelical Christian groups have been pressured by government authorities to compile and submit membership lists for their congregations, but evangelicals have resisted this demand. In the early 2000s, non-Muslim owners of grocery shops were required to indicate their religious affiliation on the fronts of their shops.

== Restrictions on religious freedom ==
=== Politics ===
By law and practice, religious minorities can be elected to a representative body or to hold senior government or military positions, and have 5 of a total 270 seats in the majlis reserved for religious minorities. Three of these seats are reserved for members of the Christian faith, including two seats for the country's Armenian Christians, and one for Assyrians. There is also one seat for a member of the Jewish faith, and one for a member of the Zoroastrian faith. While members of the Sunni Muslim minority do not have reserved seats in the majlis, they are allowed to serve in the body. Sunni members tend to come from the larger Sunni communities. Members of religious minorities are allowed to vote. All of the minority religious groups, including Sunni, are barred from being elected president.

=== Employment ===
Members of religious minorities, are supported in their pursuit of serving in the judiciary and security services. All applicants for public sector employment are screened, irrespective of their faith, for their adherence to and knowledge of Islam, and members of religious minorities can serve in lower ranks of government employment. The constitution states that the country's army must be administered by individuals who are committed to the objectives of the Iranian constitution, regardless of faith. No religious minorities are exempt from military service. Members of religious minorities with a college education could serve as an officer during their mandatory military service but could not be a career military officer.

=== Education ===
University applicants are required to pass an examination in Islamic theology, which limits the access of most religious minorities to higher education, although all public school students, including non-Muslims, must study Shia Islam. Applicants for public sector employment similarly are screened for their knowledge of Islam.

The Ministry of Education sets the religious curricula of public schools. All schools must teach a course on Shia Islamic teachings and all pupils must pass this course to progress to the next stage of study. Applicants to university must pass an exam on Islamic, Christian, or Jewish theology, based on their official religious affiliation.

=== Ministry of Education ===
The condition imposed began from 1981 and were reiterated in the fall of 1983 - the Ministry of Education and Training ordered that religious education must be done in Persian, a text written by the MET must be taught in all registered religious minority schools, schools must seek special permission for any ceremonies, and in keeping with society-wide restrictions, female teachers and students must observe Islamic dress code including Hijab when necessary (this last was re-inforced in 1985.) Even most of the time and occasions, all female citizens, including non-Muslims, are required to wear Hijab as Iran is currently an Islamic republic. There have been other requirements of citizens as well. In 1984 the government began to request religious affiliation on questionnaires for passports. Events held for religious groups were broken into and if the meetings were mixed sexed and or women were not wearing headscarves, arrests were made and meetings canceled. It was prohibited that Muslims attend these meetings of minority groups - some groups restricted events so only their own religious members could attend. There were restrictions on music at events. Many of these restrictions moderated in time or were applied to or affected one religion more vs others (see below) and the government has occasionally also taken steps to bring attention to issues important to a religion - in 1982 the Ministry of Post and Telegraphs printed a stamp commemorating the birth of Jesus.

The textbook the MET wrote on the minority religions was called Talimat-e Maxhadi Vizheh-ye Aqaliathaye Mazhabi - (Kalimi, Zarthoshti, Masihi); Religious Studies Specifically for Religious Minorities: (Jews, Zoroastrians, Christians.) The course was taught by Muslim teachers at least 3 hrs/wk. All the religious minorities objected to the text in 1982 claiming the book was a violation of Article 13 guaranteeing freedom in religious teaching, that there were overt and covert passages from the Quran, and lack of any qualifications of the anonymous author(s) rather than members of the religious minorities writing about their own religions. The situation moderated for Armenians significantly by 1995-6. There was also compromise of sorts allowed both Hebrew and Persian language use in Jewish schools.

In the early 2000s, recognized religious minorities were allowed by the Government to establish community centers and certain cultural, social, sports, or charitable associations that they finance themselves; this did not apply to the Baháʼí community, which since 1983 has been denied the right to assemble officially or to maintain administrative institutions.

=== Marriage ===
In the early 2000s Muslim men were free to marry non-Muslim women; a non-Muslim woman automatically became Muslim when the marriage took place. However, marriages between Muslim women and non-Muslim men were not recognized unless the man showed proof that he has converted to Islam. If the child of a non-Muslim family converted to Islam, he or she inherited all the wealth of the family.

=== Religious conversion and proselytizing ===
The Government does not ensure the right of citizens to change or renounce their religious faith. Apostasy, specifically conversion from Islam, can be punishable by death. In 2022, the penal code specified the death penalty for proselytizing and any attempt by non-Muslims to convert Muslims.

=== Imprisonment ===
A summary of 2013 incidents of prison sentences, fines and punishments showed "79 religious minorities were sentenced to a total of 3620 months in prison, 200 months probation, 75 lashings and 41,030,000,000 rials in fines. In this area, 49% of the cases involved Baháʼí minorities, 16% Christian and Dervish and 14% Sunni minority. Arrests of religious minorities increased by 36% in relation to last year."

In 2022, the UN Special Rapporteur expressed concern about the number of executions of members of minority communities, noting that members of the Baluch and Kurdish minorities accounted for 35% of executions in the first half of the year; the Abdorrahman Boroumand Center for Human Rights in Iran reported 576 executions in 2022, compared to 317 executions in 2021 and 248 in 2020. In the same year, the Human Rights Activists News Agency reported 140 arrests, 51 travel bans, 94 house raids and 11 court cases based on citizens' religious beliefs.

=== Dress code ===
On 7 March 1979, less than a month after the Iranian Revolution, the Supreme Leader Ruhollah Khomeini decreed the hijab (Islamic headscarf) to be mandatory for all women in workplaces. He further decreed that women would no longer be allowed to enter any government office without the hijab, as they would be "naked" without it.

Since then, violence and harassment against women not wearing the hijab in accordance with Iranian government standards, whether by law enforcement personnel or pro-government vigilantes, has been reported, From 1980, women could not enter government or public buildings or attend their workplaces without a hijab. In 1983, mandatory hijab in public was introduced in the penal code, stating that "women who appear in public without religious hijab will be sentenced to whipping up to 74 lashes". In practice, however, a number of women, such as Saba Kord Afshari and Yasaman Aryani, were sentenced only to heavy prison terms.

In the 2010s and 2020s, clothing in Iranian society underwent significant changes, and young women in particular became more liberal about hijab rules. This has prompted the Guidance Patrol, Iran's Islamic religious police, to launch intermittent campaigns to verbally admonish or violently arrest and "re-educate" women they considered to be wearing the hijab incorrectly. Under routine circumstances, the detainees are brought to a center where they are re-instructed in the dress regulations, before being made to sign a pledge to uphold said regulations, and then being allowed to leave with their family.

Protests against the compulsory hijab have been common since the 1979 revolution. One of the largest protests took place between 8 and 14 March 1979, beginning on International Women's Day, a day after hijab rules were introduced by the Islamic Republic. Protests against mandatory hijab rules continued, such as during the 2019–2020 protests, when protesters attacked a Guidance Patrol van and freed two detained women.

In 2020, two representatives of Supreme Leader Ali Khamenei separately said that improperly veiled women should be made to feel "unsafe". The representatives later backtracked and said that their comments were misunderstood. Among the general population, an independent survey conducted in the same year showed that 58% of Iranians did not believe in hijab altogether, and 72% were against compulsory hijab rules. Only 15% insisted on the legal obligation to wear it in public.

November 2022 saw the death of Mahsa Amini at the hands of morality police, after she was detained for allegedly wearing her hijab in an incorrect way. By the end of the month, protests throughout the country had led to the deaths of at least 448 people and an estimated 18,170 arrests.

=== Baháʼís ===
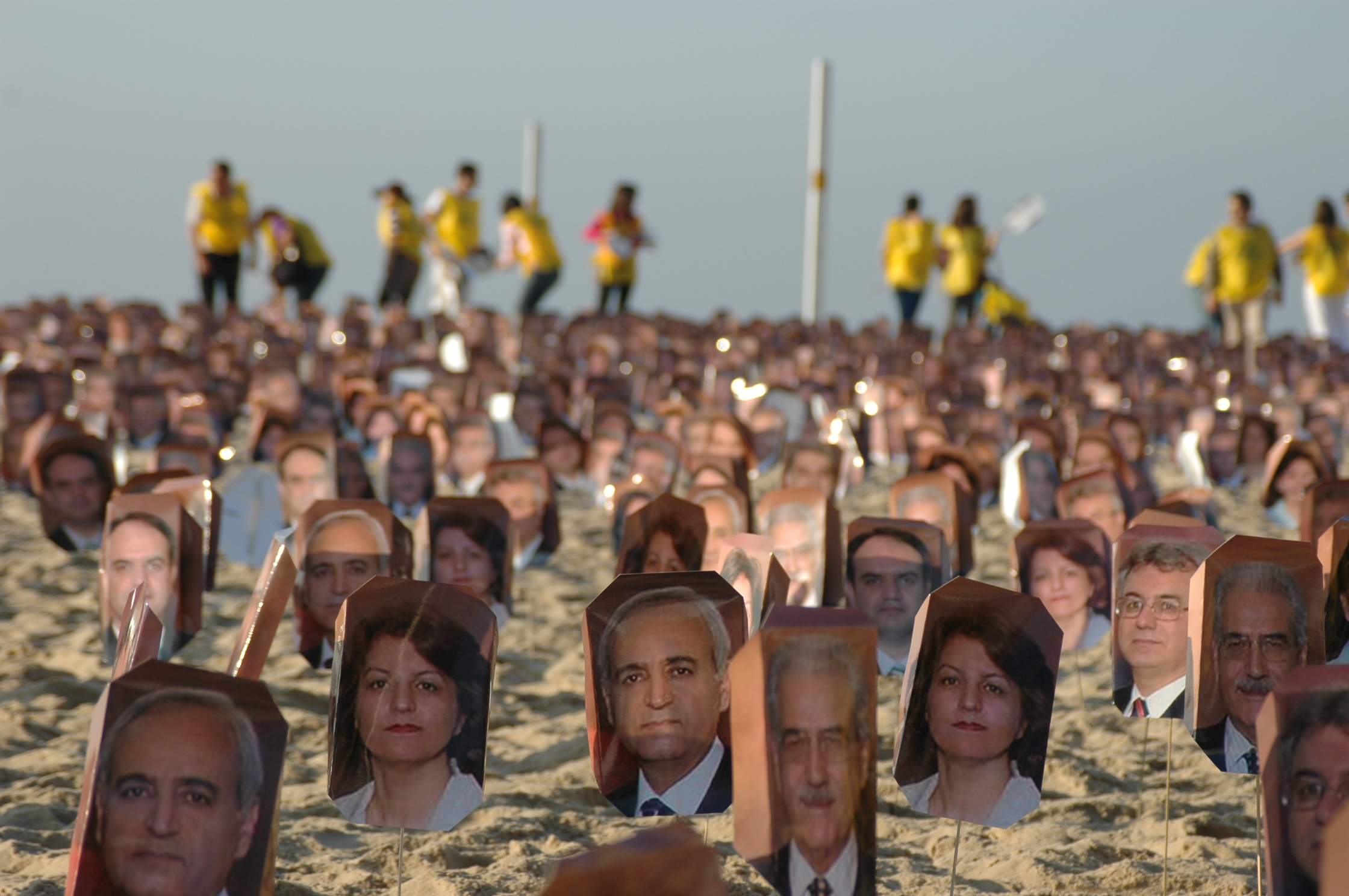
Images of the faces of the Yaran, a group of 7 Bahá'í leaders imprisoned in Iran, at a rally in Rio de Janeiro, Brazil.

The Baháʼí Faith originated in Iran during the 1860s. The Baháʼís believe their prophet to be the Messiah for this era. Initially it attracted a wide following among Shi'a clergy. The political and religious authorities of that time joined to suppress the movement, and since then the hostility of the Shi'a clergy to the Baháʼí Faith has remained strong. Baháʼís are considered apostates by the Shi'a clergy because of their claim to a valid religious revelation subsequent to that of Mohammed. The Baháʼí Faith is defined by the Government as a political "sect," historically linked to the Pahlavi regime and, hence, counterrevolutionary, even though one of the tenets of the Baháʼí Faith is non-involvement in partisan politics.

Baháʼís may not teach or practice their faith or maintain links with coreligionists abroad. The fact that the Baháʼí world headquarters (established by the founder of the Baháʼí Faith in the 19th century, in what was then Ottoman-controlled Palestine) is situated in what is now the state of Israel, allows the Iranian government to charge the Baháʼís with "espionage on behalf of Zionism," in particular when caught communicating with or sending monetary contributions to the Baháʼí headquarters.

Broad restrictions on Baháʼís appear to be aimed at destroying them as a community. Baháʼís repeatedly have been offered relief from mistreatment in exchange for recanting their faith. Baháʼí cemeteries, holy places, historical sites, administrative centers, and other assets were seized shortly after the 1979 revolution. None of the properties have been returned, and many have been destroyed.

Baháʼís are not allowed to bury and honor their dead in keeping with their religious tradition. They are permitted access only to areas of wasteland that the Government designates for their use, and are not allowed to mark the graves. Many historic Baháʼí gravesites have been desecrated or destroyed.

In what appeared to be a hopeful development, in 2002 the Government offered the Tehran community a piece of land for use as a cemetery. However, the land was in the desert, with no access to water, making it impossible to perform Baháʼí mourning rituals. In addition the Government stipulated that no markers be put on individual graves and that no mortuary facilities be built on the site, making it impossible to perform a proper burial.

Baháʼí group meetings and religious education, which often take place in private homes and offices, are curtailed severely. Public and private universities continue to deny admittance to Baháʼí students, a particularly demoralizing blow to a community that traditionally has placed a high value on education. Denial of access to higher education appears aimed at the eventual impoverishment of the Baháʼí community. The Baháʼí Institute for Higher Education was founded in 1987 and continues to operate despite government persecution.

Baháʼís regularly are denied compensation for injury or criminal victimization. Government authorities claim that only Muslim plaintiffs are eligible for compensation in these circumstances.

In 1993, the UNSR reported the existence of a government policy directive regarding the Baháʼís. According to the directive, the Supreme Revolutionary Council instructed government agencies to block the progress and development of the Baháʼí community, expel Baháʼí students from universities, cut Baháʼí links with groups outside the country, restrict employment of Baháʼís, and deny Baháʼís "positions of influence," including in education. The Government claims that the directive is a forgery. However, it appears to be an accurate reflection of current government practice designed to eradicate slowly the Baháʼí community.

In September 2001, the Ministry of Justice issued a report that reiterated that government policy continued to aim at the eventual elimination of the Baháʼís as a community. It stated in part that Baháʼís would only be permitted to enroll in schools if they did not identify themselves as Baháʼís, and that Baháʼís preferably should be enrolled in schools that have a strong and imposing religious ideology. The report also stated that Baháʼís must be expelled from universities, either in the admission process or during the course of their studies, once it becomes known that they are Baháʼís.

While in recent years the Government has eased some restrictions, thereby enabling Baháʼís to obtain food-ration booklets and send their children to public elementary and secondary schools, the prohibition against the admission of Baháʼís to universities remains. Thousands of Baháʼís dismissed from government jobs in the early 1980s receive no unemployment benefits and have been required to repay the Government for salaries or pensions received from the first day of employment. Those unable to do so face prison sentences.

Iran has taken some positive steps in recognizing the rights of Baháʼís, as well as other religious minorities. In November 1999, President Khatami publicly stated that no one in the country should be persecuted because of their religious beliefs. He added that he would defend the civil rights of all citizens, regardless of their beliefs or religion. Subsequently, the Expediency Council approved the "Right of Citizenship" bill, affirming the social and political rights of all citizens and their equality before the law. In February 2000, following approval of the bill, the head of the judiciary issued a circular letter to all registry offices throughout the country that provided for any couple to be registered as husband and wife without being required to state their religious affiliation. The measure effectively permits the registration of Baháʼí marriages in the country. Previously Baháʼí marriages were not recognized by the Government, leaving Baháʼí women open to charges of prostitution. Thus children of Baháʼí marriages were not recognized as legitimate and therefore denied inheritance rights.

According to a U.S. panel, attacks on Baháʼís in Iran have increased since Mahmoud Ahmadinejad became president as well as Sunni Muslims. On May 14, 2008, members of an informal body known as the Friends that oversaw the needs of the Baháʼí community in Iran were arrested and taken to Evin prison. Officers from the Ministry of Intelligence in Tehran searched and raided the homes of the six people in the early hours of May 14. The arrest of the six follow the detention of another Baháʼí leader in March, who was originally taken to answer questions relating to the burial of a Baháʼí in the Baháʼí cemetery in Mashad. They have not been charged, and are prisoners of conscience. The Iran Human Rights Documentation Center has stated that they are concerned for the safety of the Baháʼís, and that the recent events are similar to the disappearance of 25 Baháʼí leaders in the early 1980s. The United States Commission on International Religious Freedom has stated that it fears that the "development signals a return to the darkest days of repression in Iran in the 1980s when Baha'is were routinely arrested, imprisoned, and executed."

Geneva, June 10, 2020, The Baháʼí International Community (BIC) issued a statement on the situation of Baháʼís in Iran, expressing concern over the "unprecedented number of new prison sentences, re-incarceration and a media campaign of hatred, are raising concerns of the long-persecuted religious minority in the country.," "re-incarceration," and "media disgusting campaign" against Baháʼís in Iran. According to the statement, the Iranian authorities have ramped up their persecution of the Baháʼís, targeting at least 71 individuals across the country in recent weeks. Reports of new threats to “uproot” the community in Shiraz.

=== Jews ===
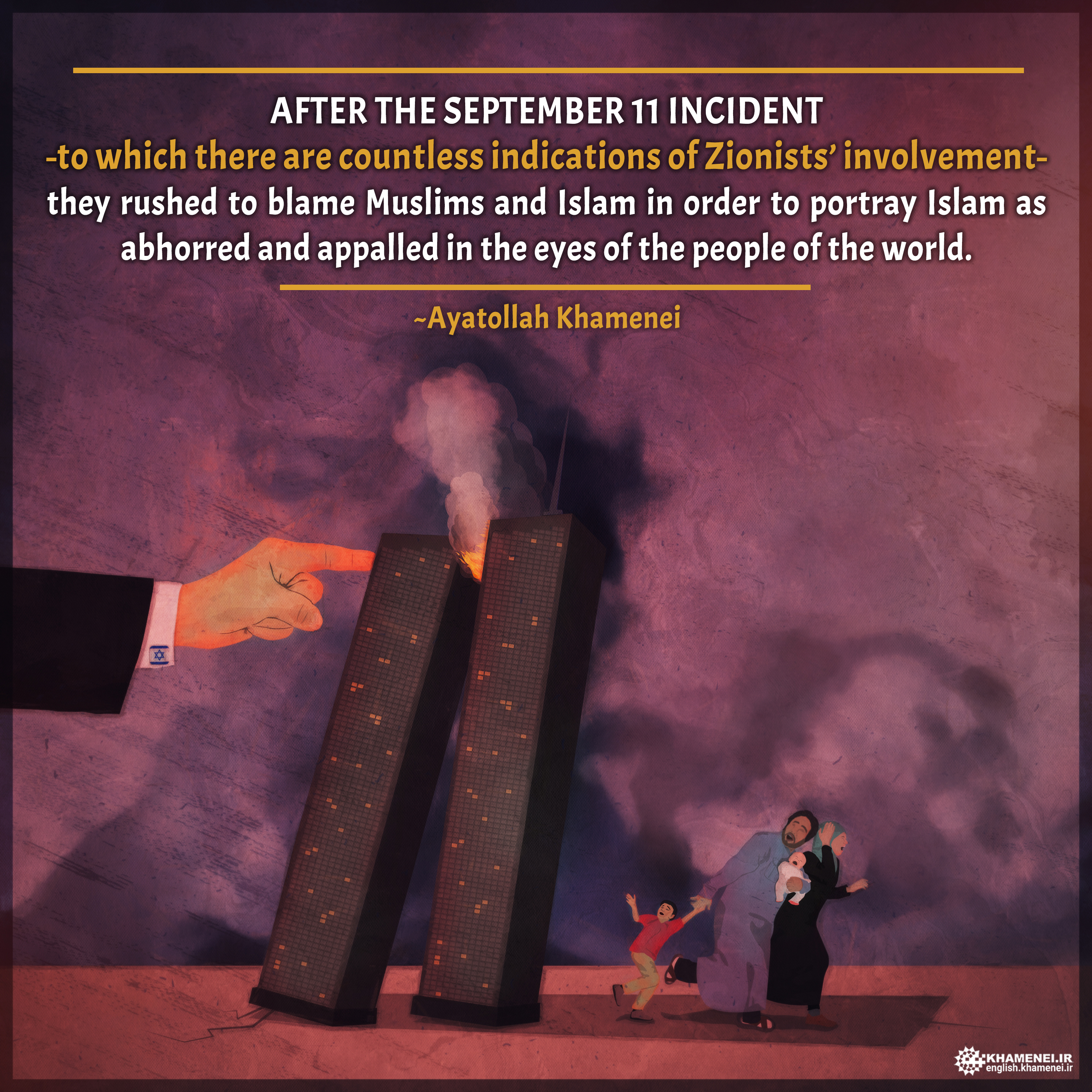
A poster on the website of Ali Khamenei blaming Jews for the 9/11 attacks.

While Jews are a recognized religious minority, allegations of official discrimination are frequent. The Government's anti-Israel policies, along with a perception among radical Muslim elements that all Jewish citizens support Zionism and the State of Israel, create a threatening atmosphere for the small Jewish community. In the past, Jewish leaders reportedly were reluctant to draw attention to official mistreatment of their community due to fear of government reprisal.

Persecution and discrimination has increased among the government and society since the Revolution in 1979. On the eve of Passover 1998, 13 Iranian Jewish men were arrested on charges of espionage. The United States and Israel both demanded their release. Iran accused the men of spying for "world arrogance" (being the U.S.) and the "Zionist regime" (being Israel). The conviction is highly doubted by the rest of the world.

Institute for Monitoring Peace and Cultural Tolerance in School Education (IMPACT-se) reviewed school textbooks in 2022 and noted that Jewish history in Iran is avoided and the Holocaust is ignored; there is also much antisemitic rhetoric, anti-Israeli propaganda, and anecdotes which present the Jews as partners to Sunni Muslims, without any counterbalancing material.

The head of the Anti-Defamation Union says that the tomb of "Esther and Mordecai", the burial place of Xerxes' Jewish wife, which is considered a Jewish religious site, has been set on fire in Hamedan.

=== Mandaeans ===
According to the U.N. High Commission for Refugees Background Paper on Iran, the Mandaeans are regarded as Christians, and are included among the country's three recognized religious minorities. However, Mandaeans regard themselves not as Christians, but as adherents of a religion that predates Christianity in both belief and practice. Mandaeans enjoyed official support as a distinct religion prior to the revolution, but their legal status as a religion has been the subject of debate in the Majles and by 2002 it was not yet clarified. It is almost impossible for declared Mandaeans to work or study at university and many have left the country since 2000.

== Abuses of religious freedom ==
It was noted in 2014 that individuals who have been "targeted and prosecuted" by the Iranian state" for religious crimes of apostasy and blasphemy/"Swearing at the Prophet", were "diverse" and included "Muslim-born converts to Christianity, Bahá'ís, Muslims who challenge the prevailing interpretation of Islam, and others who espouse unconventional religious beliefs"; some cases had "clear political overtones", while others "seem to be primarily of a religious nature".

On October 27, 2020, US Secretary of State Mike Pompeo issued a statement on World Religious Freedom Day, including Iran as one of the three of the world's most egregious violators of religious freedom—the People's Republic of China, Iran and North Korea—and that these countries "have tightened their coercive measures to silence their own people".

=== Baháʼís ===
Information in 2022 suggests that there were 300,000 Baháʼís in Iran.

According to the National Spiritual Assembly of the Baháʼís of the United States, between 1979 and 2005, more than 200 Baháʼís were killed and 15 disappeared and are presumed dead.

Manuchehr Khulusi was arrested in June 1999 while visiting fellow Baháʼís in the town of Birjand, and was imprisoned until his release in May 2000. During his imprisonment, Khulusi was interrogated, beaten, held in solitary confinement, and denied access to his lawyer. The charges brought against him remain unknown, but they were believed to be related to his faith. The Islamic Revolutionary Court in Mashhad held a 2-day trial in September 1999 and sentenced Khulusi to death in February 2000. He was released the following year.

The Government appears to engage in harassment of the Baháʼí community by arresting Baháʼís arbitrarily, charging them, and then releasing them, often without dropping the charges against them. Those with charges still pending against them fear arrest at any time. In 2022, Baháʼís in the USA stated that there were over 1,000 Baháʼís in Iranian prisons.

The property rights of Baháʼís generally are disregarded. In the early 2000s, it was noted that the Government's seizure of Baháʼí personal property, as well as its denial of Baháʼí access to education and employment, are eroding the economic base of the Baháʼí community. In 2020, a court ruled that Baháʼí was “a perverse ideology” and therefore they had no “legitimacy in their ownership” of any property; Baháʼís argued that their property rights are enshrined in a 1984 fatwa issued by then Supreme Leader Ayatollah Khomeini.

In 1998, after a nationwide raid of more than 500 Baháʼí homes and offices, as well as numerous arrests, the authorities closed the Baháʼí Institute of Higher Learning. Also known as the "Open University," the Institute was established by the Baháʼí community shortly after the revolution to offer higher educational opportunities to Baháʼí students who had been denied access to the country's high schools and universities. This was one of several closures between 1987 and 2005, with more arrests in 2011 and 2014.

A confidential letter sent on October 29, 2005 by the Chairman of the Command Headquarters of the Armed Forced in Iran stated that the Supreme Leader of Iran, Ayatollah Khamenei instructed the Command Headquarters to identify people who adhered to the Baháʼí Faith and monitor their activities; In a press release, the UN Special Rapporteur states that she "is highly concerned by information she has received concerning the treatment of members of the Baháʼí community in Iran." She further states that "The Special Rapporteur is concerned that this latest development indicates that the situation with regard to religious minorities in Iran is, in fact, deteriorating."

Shahnaz Sabet, a Baháʼí citizen living in Shiraz, was arrested on Monday, October 12, 2020, and transferred to Adelabad Prison in Shiraz to serve his sentence.

=== Christians ===
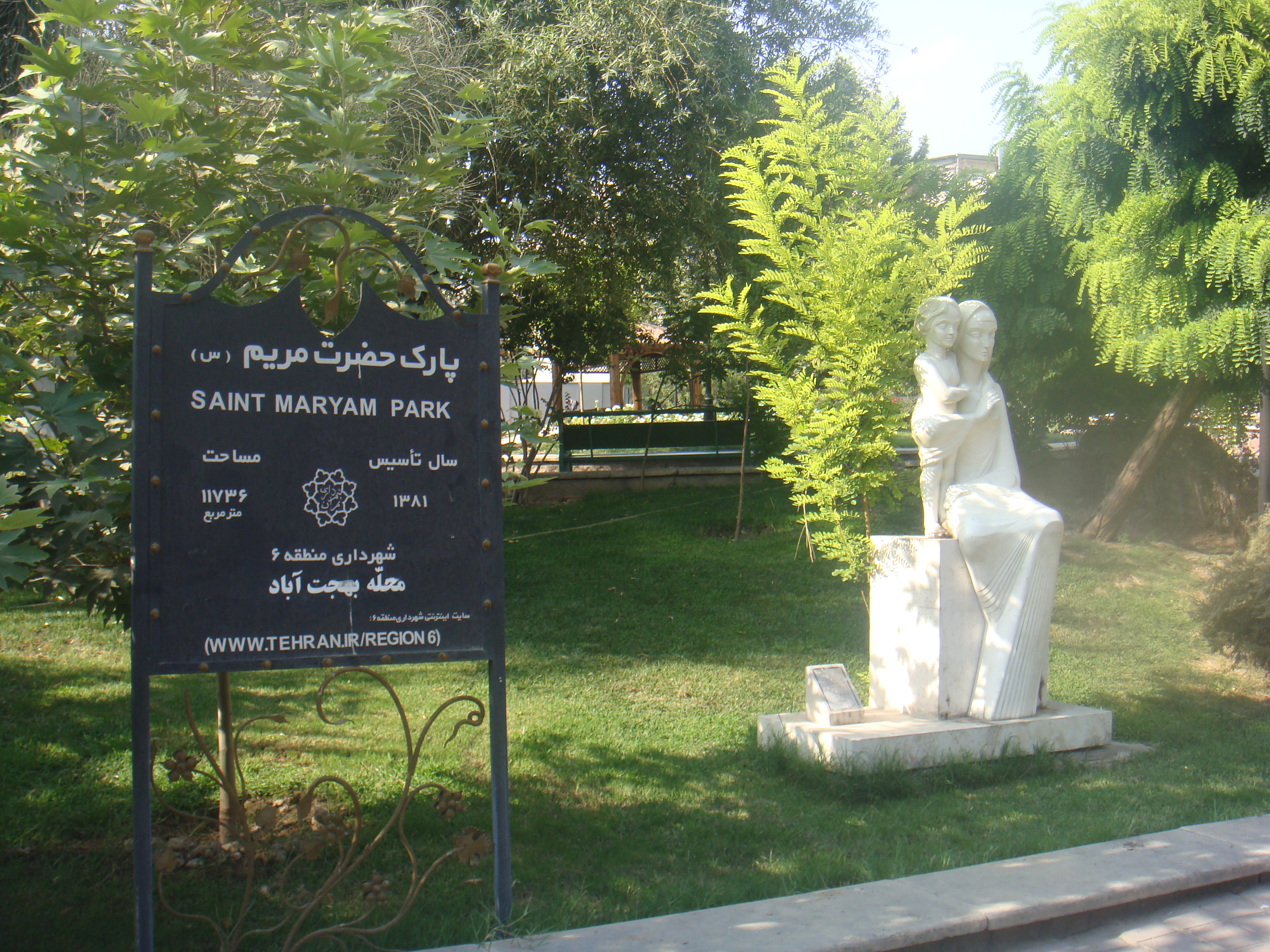
Saint Mary Park in Tehran (2011)

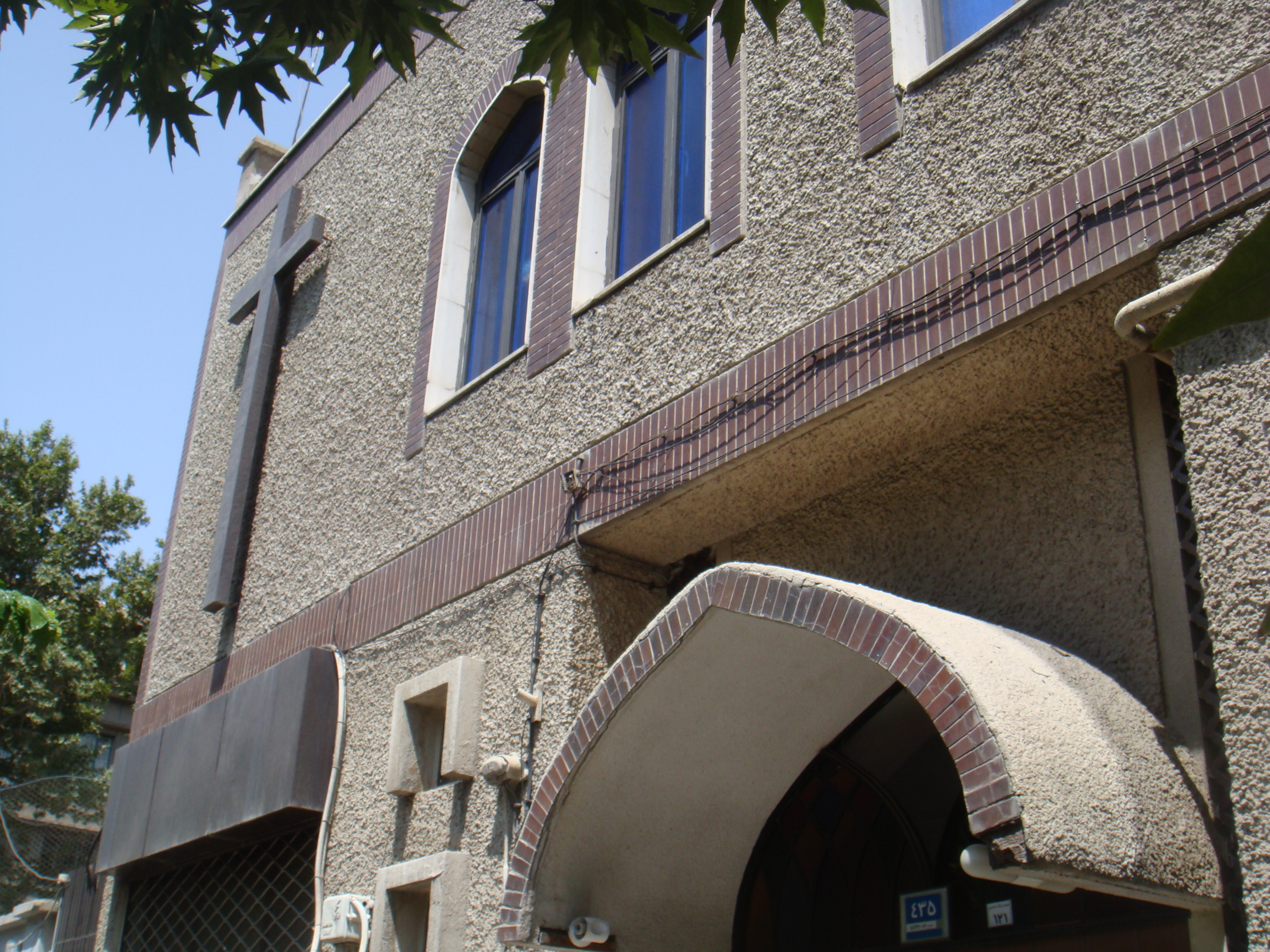
Protestant church in Tehran (Qods Street, across Tehran University, 140 m away from Ali Khamenei residence), taken 2011

Blasphemy law in Iran is used as a weapon against Christians and Christianity within Iran's borders.

Government-sanctioned translations of the Bible are reported to be available in Iran; however unsanctioned copies have been confiscated by the government.

In 2010 Youcef Nadarkhani, a Jammiat-e Rabbani (Christian) pastor, was given a death sentence for apostasy; he was acquitted of apostasy, sparing him the death penalty, but found guilty of proselytizing and released as he had already served his time. In 2017, he was arrested on charges of “acting against national security” and promoting “Zionist Christianity,” and was sentenced to 10 years imprisonment; both his sons were denied educational advancement. He was released in February 2023, but faced new charges in July 2023.

In 1976, the Christian population numbered 168,593 people, mostly Armenians. Due to the Iran–Iraq War in the 1980s and the dissolution of the Soviet Union in the 1990s, almost half of the Armenians migrated to the newly independent Armenia. However, the opposite trend has occurred since 2000, and the number of Christians with Iranian citizenship increased to 109,415 in 2006 and 117,704 in 2011. According to the national statistical centre, Christians were fastest growing religion in Iran during 1996-2006 period (+38.9%), and second fastest during 2006-2011 period (+7.6%, after Zoroastrianism). At the same time, significant immigration of Assyrians from Iraq has been recorded due to massacres and harassment in post-Saddam Iraq. However, most of those Assyrians in Iran do not have Iranian citizenship. In 2008, the central office of the International Union of Assyrians, a mistranslation in the Iranian press for the Assyrian Universal Alliance, was officially transferred to Iran after being hosted in the United States for more than four decades.

==== Education of Armenian Christians ====
Some issues dealing with Christianity in Iran deal more directly with the Armenian ethnic minorities. For example, in early 1983 the MET specifically requested that the Armenian religious schools teach religion in Persian and time allocated to the Armenian languages must be reduced or eliminated. While the community responded to these orders issues raised in discussions included if the Armenians could speak/teach their own language other minorities would demand the same but also if Persian was used it would make proselytization easier as facility with Persian language use of religious issues improved. At the end of the 1983 academic year the MET requested the questions that were to be included in the final exam and the questions had to be sent in Persian and were ordered to be used in Persian as the final exam. Most fifth grade students refused to take the test and 3rd grade students handed in blank pages. The authorities then failed all the students. Some schools ignored the demands on languages, others did limit teaching to 2 hrs and others removed it entirely. Some continued religious classes and some dropped them all together. Observance of these rules on Armenian language teaching was most strict in Tehran while 6 to 8 hrs per week were common beyond. However, in 1995 the limit on languages was raised from 2 hrs to 5 hrs per week in Tehran as well. Circa 1996 a settlement was reached; during the first two months of each school year, the ministry-provided Persian book on religious ethics is taught in Armenian schools while Armenian-approved religious lessons are taught in Armenian for the rest of the year. This was not a totally satisfactory settlement of the issue for both sides, but it settled the issue.

In 2002, Armenian Christians reported that they were permitted to teach their practices to Armenian students as an elective at some schools. Assyrian Christians were also permitted to use their own religious textbooks in their schools, as long as the government authorized their content.

=== Jews ===
In 1984 the government began to request religious affiliation on questionnaires for passports. In contrast to other registered religious minorities starting in 1983, Jewish families were prevented from traveling as a group and if one member of the family traveled then another family member's passport was held. Regardless, thousands of Jews had emigrated in the first eight months of 1987 through Austria. Perhaps half the Jews left Iran leaving about 30,000 Jews by 1986. Some may have returned in the late 1980s. Generally the overall economic position has deteriorated significantly post revolution.

It is estimated that a minimum of 13 Jews have been executed by Iran since the country's revolution. Of them include two men (not of the ones written above) hanged in 1997 for allegedly spying for Israel and the United States; as well as businessman Ruhollah Kadkhodah-Zadeh who was hanged in prison without a public charge or legal proceeding, apparently for assisting Jews to emigrate.

=== Shia ===
The Special Clerical Court (SCC) system, established in 1987 to investigate offenses and crimes committed by clerics and which the Supreme Leader oversees directly, is not provided for in the constitution and operates outside the domain of the judiciary. In 2006 critics alleged that the clerical courts were used to prosecute certain clerics for expressing controversial ideas and for participating in activities outside the area of religion, including journalism.

During the latter part of 2000, a Special Clerical Court began the trial of Hojatoleslam Hassan Yousefi Eshkevari, a cleric who participated in a conference in Berlin on Iran, on charges of apostasy, "corruption on earth," "declaring war on God," and "denial of basic religious principles," which potentially carry the death penalty. Eshkevari has called for more liberal interpretations of Islamic law in certain areas. The verdict was not announced, but, according to Amnesty International, Eshkevari widely was reported to have been sentenced to death. In November 2001, following domestic and international criticism, his sentence reportedly was reduced to 30 months' imprisonment and removal of his status as a cleric. He served four years in prison and was released on 6 February 2005. During the crackdown on protestors of the 2009 presidential elections, he fled to Germany to seek political asylum.

Independent newspapers and magazines have been closed, and leading publishers and journalists imprisoned, with 25 journalists detained in the first 8 months of 2023.

In 2002 academic Hashem Aghajari was sentenced to death for blasphemy against Muhammed, based on a speech in which he challenged Muslims not to blindly follow the clergy. After domestic Iranian and international outcry, his sentence was reduced to five years in prison. He was released from prison in July 2004 after paying a bail of $122,500. In 2014, he is sentenced to one year in prison on a charge of "propaganda against the regime".

In November 2018, a prison warden at Qarchak women's prison in Varamin, attacked and bit three Dervish religious minority prisoners who were demanding their confiscated belongings back.

=== Zoroastrians ===
Zoroastrian served as the national- or state religion of a significant portion of the Iranian people for many centuries before it was gradually marginalized by Islam from the 7th century onwards. The political power of the pre-Islamic Iranian dynasties lent Zoroastrians immense prestige in ancient times, and some of its leading doctrines were adopted by other religious systems.

There are no official reports of government harassment of the Zoroastrian community to date. Unofficial reports of discrimination in employment and education has come up, but are by no means frequent. Zoroastrians are free to make their annual pilgrimage to one of the holiest sites of their faith, the temple of Chak Chak, Yazd (near the city of Yazd).

== Societal attitudes ==
The continuous activity of the country's pre-Islamic, non-Muslim communities, such as Zoroastrians, Jews, and Christians, has accustomed the population to the presence of non-Muslims in society. However, actions of the conservative parts of society and the government create a threatening atmosphere for some religious minorities. For a Christian, Jew or Zoroastrian there is constant pressure at school to convert.

The Jewish community has been reduced to less than one-half of its prerevolutionary size. Some of this emigration is connected with the larger, general waves of departures following the establishment of the Islamic Republic, but some also stems from continued perceived anti-Semitism on the part of the government and within society.

In 2022, officials continued to use antisemitic rhetoric in official statements and permitted its use in publications and media. It was reported that the government-affiliated Fars News Agency accused Ukrainian President Volodymyr Zelenskyy of “Zionist behavior”; it was also reported that the Jewish Studies Center had published more than 1,000 antisemitic articles, reports, commentaries, books, and videos across 6 years.

It was reported that ISIS were active in the country in 2022, in particular, attacking the Shia Shah Cheragh Shrine in Shiraz and killing 15 people.

== See also ==
- Religion in Iran
- Human rights in Iran
