= Christianity in Iran =

Iranian Christians
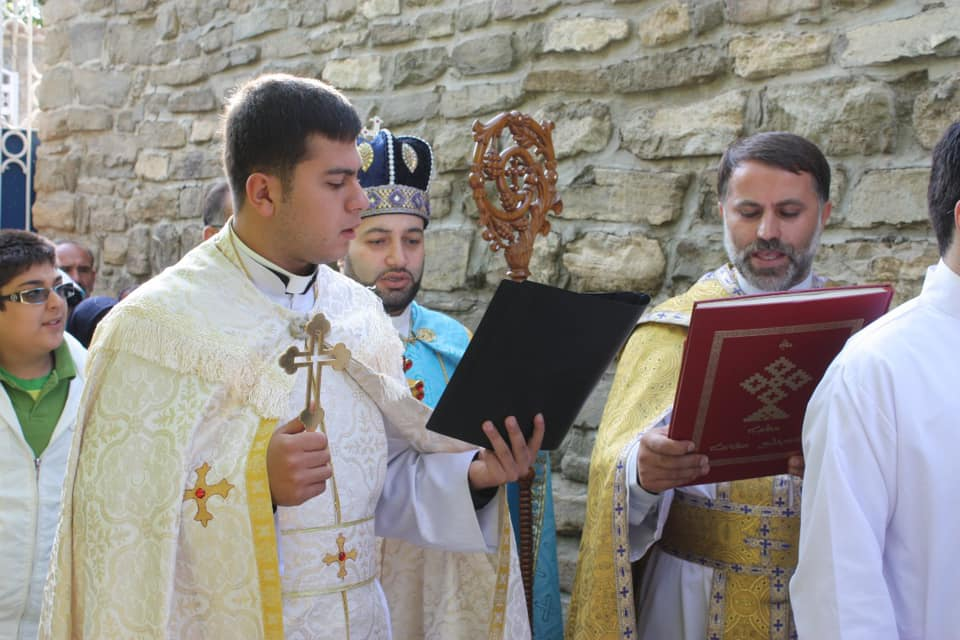
- Assyrian Christians from Urmia

Total population
- 300,000–370,000

Languages
- Persian, Armenian and Aramaic (Suret)

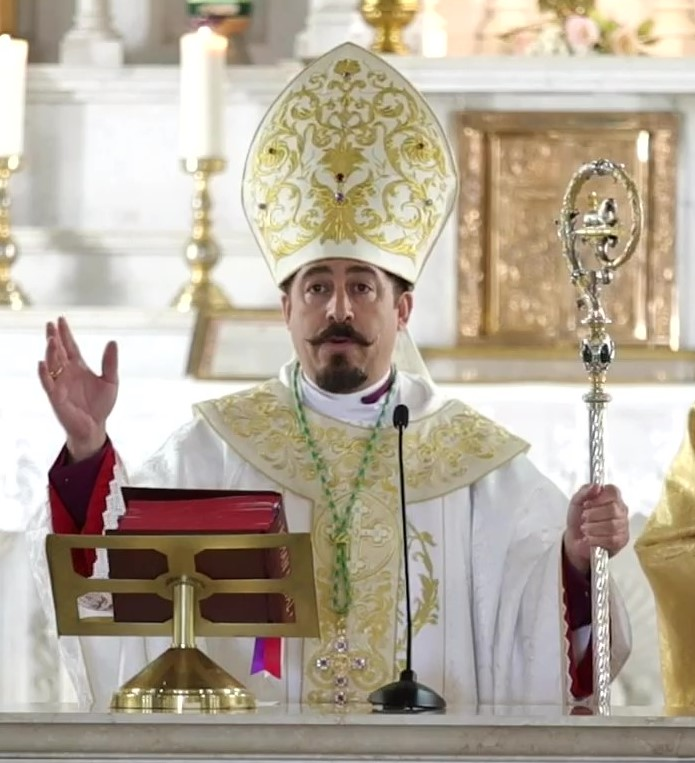
His Eminence Archbishop Edik Baroni Iranian Armenian bishop and Christian leader

In Iran, Christianity dates back to the early years of the religion. Through this time the Christian faith has always been followed by a minority of the population of Iran under its different state religions: Zoroastrianism in ancient Persia, followed by Sunni Islam in the Middle Ages after the Arab conquest, then Shia Islam since the Safavid conversion of the 15th century. However, Christians comprised a larger share of the population in the past than they do today. Armenians are the largest Christian community in Iran.

== Major denominations ==
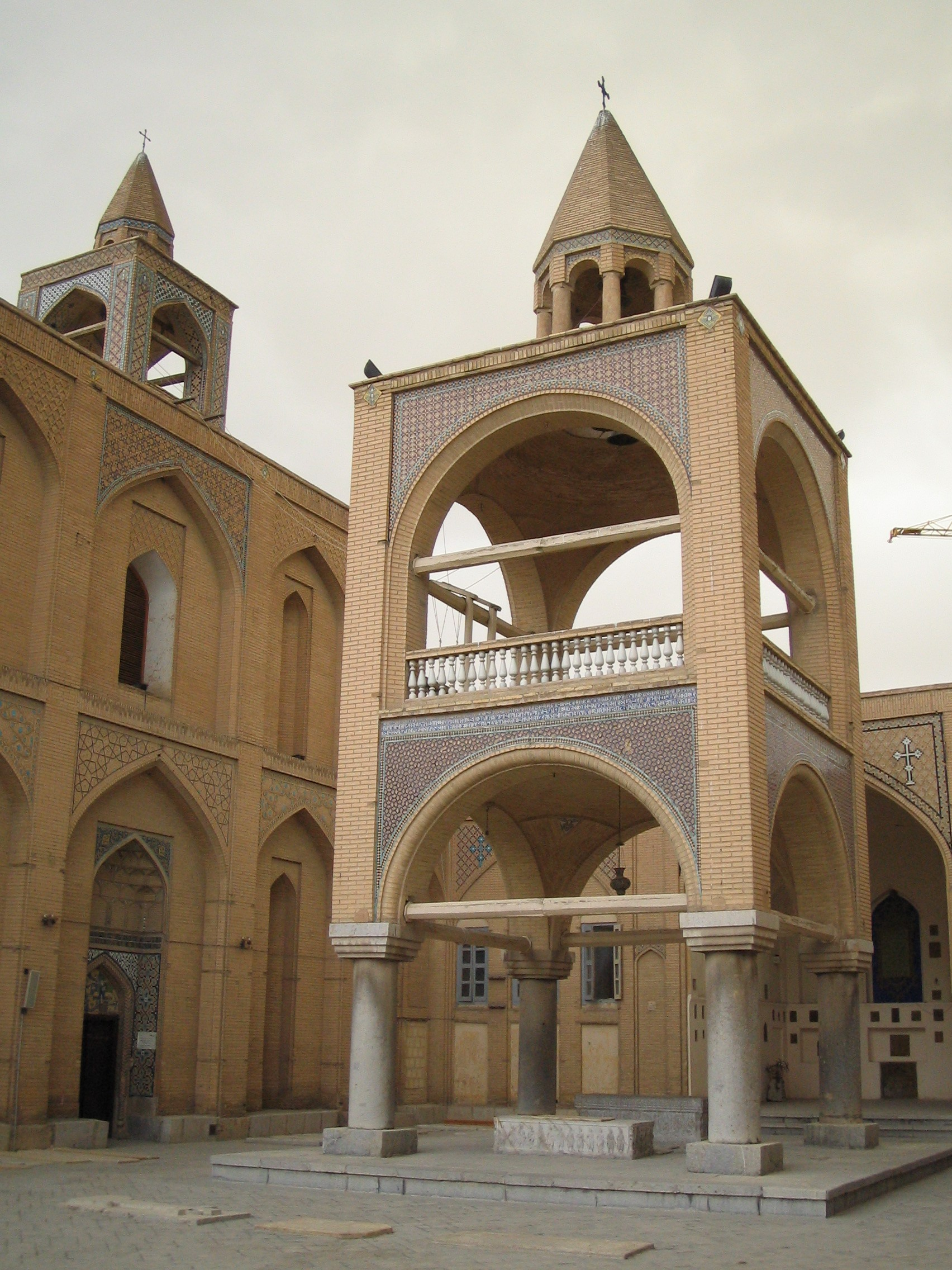
The Armenian Orthodox Vank Cathedral of Isfahan (completed 1664) is a relic of the Safavid era.

A number of Christian denominations are represented in Iran. Many members of the larger and older churches belong to minority ethnic groups, with the Armenians and Assyrians having their own distinctive culture and language. The members of the newer and smaller churches are drawn both from the traditionally Christian ethnic minorities and converts from a non-Christian background.

The major Christian churches in Iran are:

- Armenian Apostolic Church (between 110,000, 250,000, and 300,000 adherents)
- Assyrian Church of the East (about 11,000–20,000 adherents),
- Catholic Church (about 21,380 adherents) in three different rites.
  - Chaldean Catholic Church (3,900 adherents as of 2014)
  - Armenian Catholic Church
  - Latin Church
- Assyrian Evangelical Church Presbyterian
- Assyrian Pentecostal Church Pentecostal
- Jamaʿat-e Rabbani (Iranian Assemblies of God)
- Anglican Diocese of Iran
- Russian Orthodox Church

According to Operation World, there are between 7,000 and 15,000 members and adherents of the various Protestant, Evangelical, and other minority Christian denominations in Iran.

In the 2016 census, the Statistical Center of Iran reported there were 117,700 Christians in the country; other reports put the figure at over half a million people.

The "Country Information and Guidance: Christians and Christian Converts, Iran" report published in December 2014 by the U.K. Home Office states that there were 370,000 Christians in Iran.

== History ==
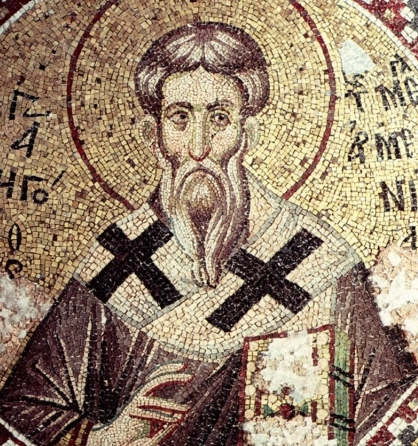
Gregory

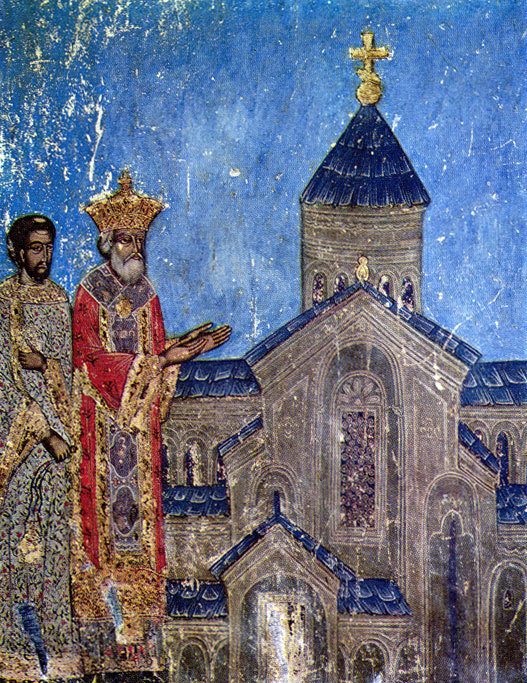
Mirian

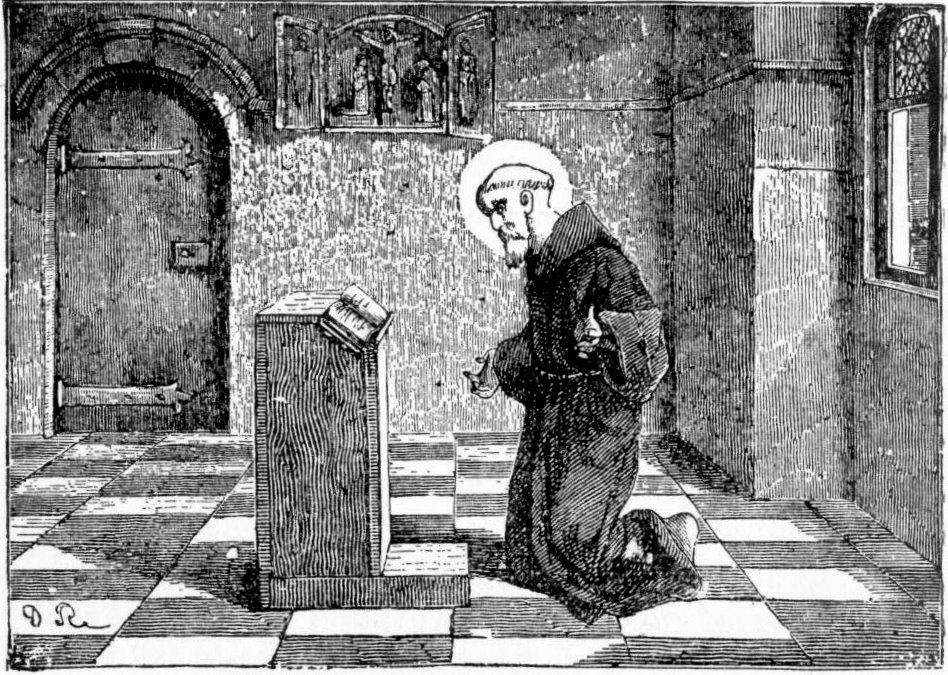
Bademus

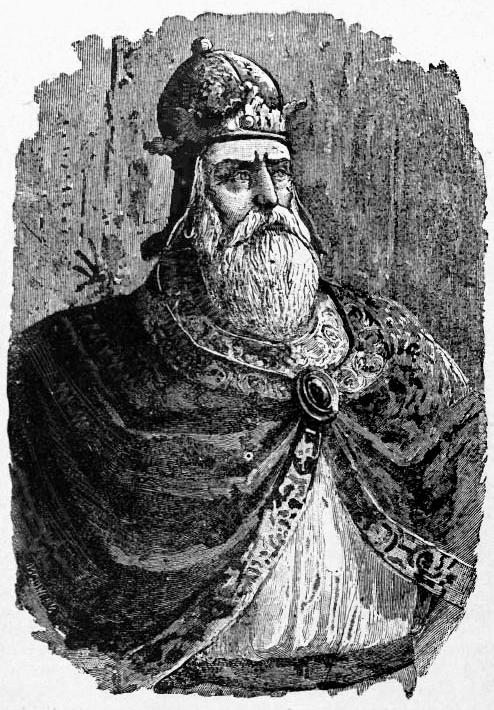
Tiridates

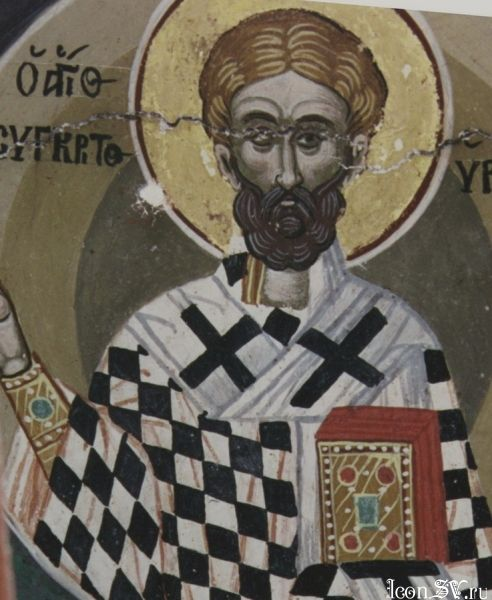
Asyncritus

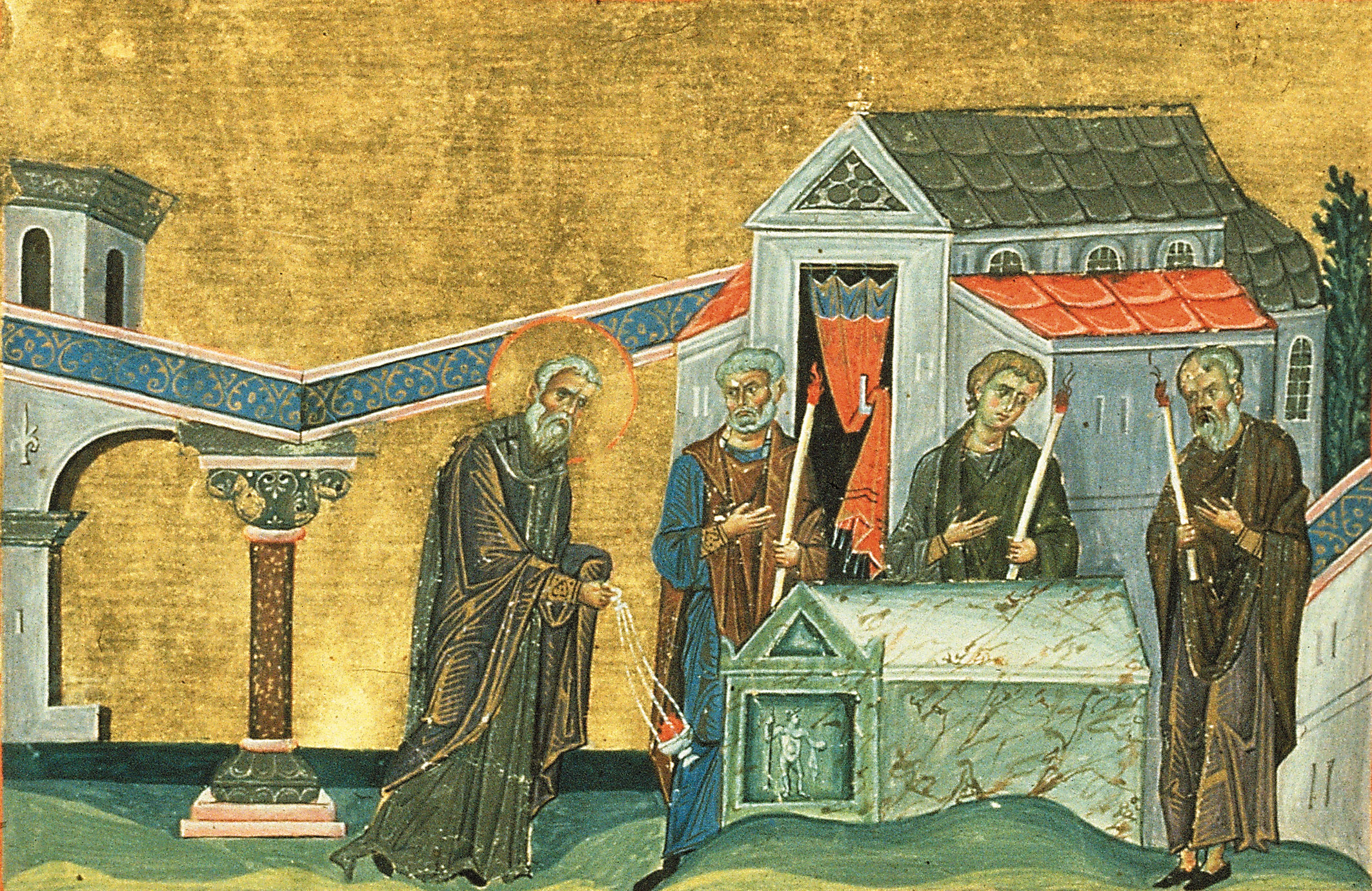
Maruthas

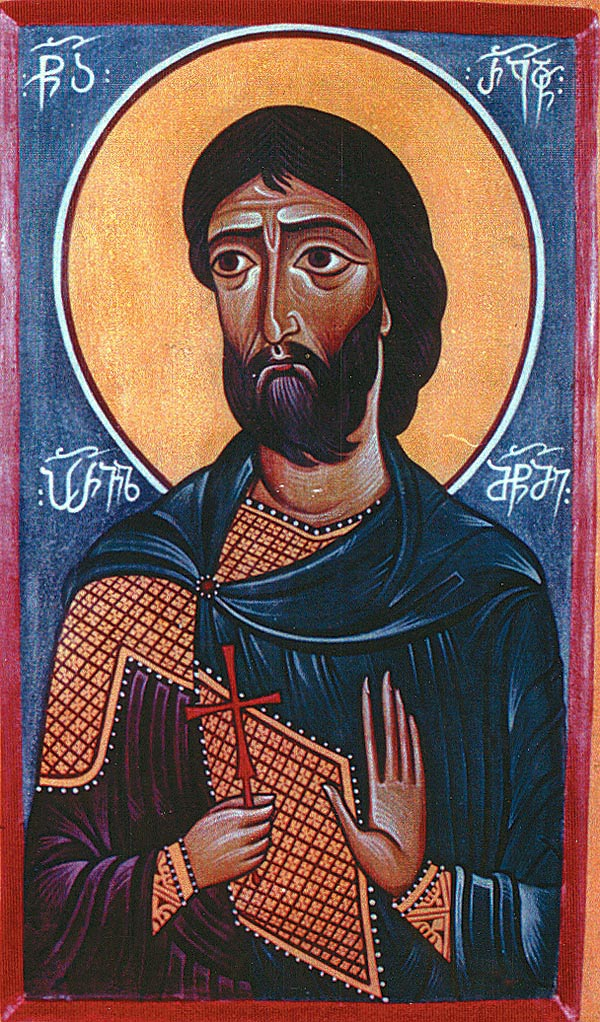
Razhden the Protomartyr

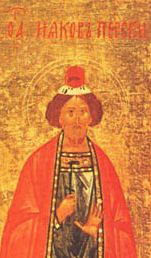
James

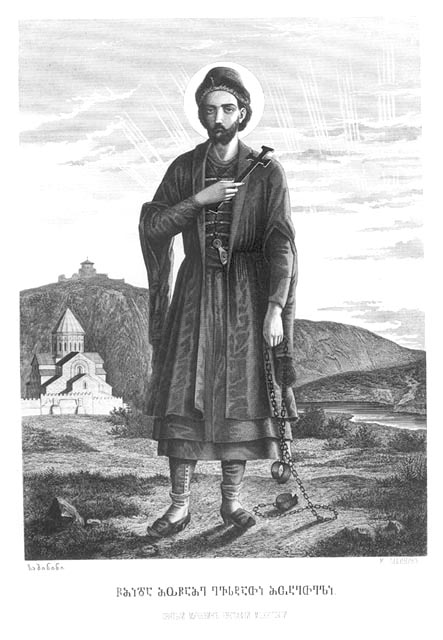
Eustathius

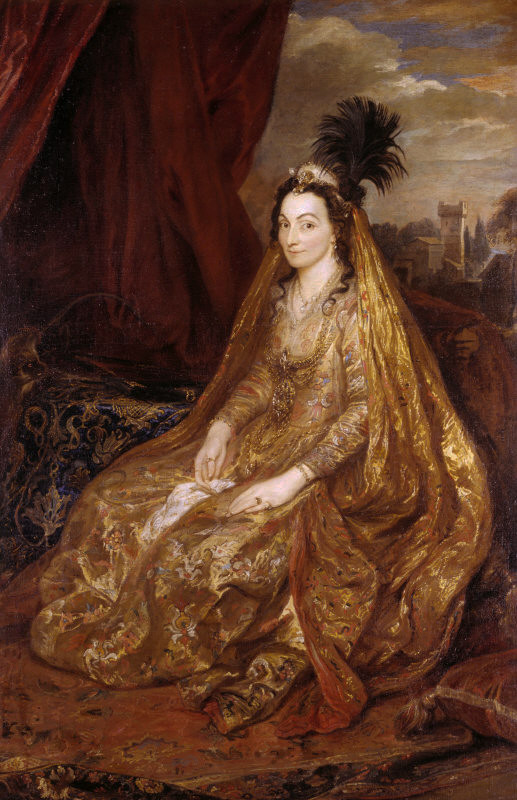
Teresia Sampsonia

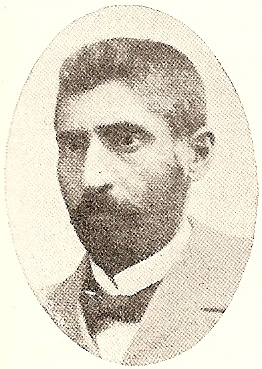
Josef

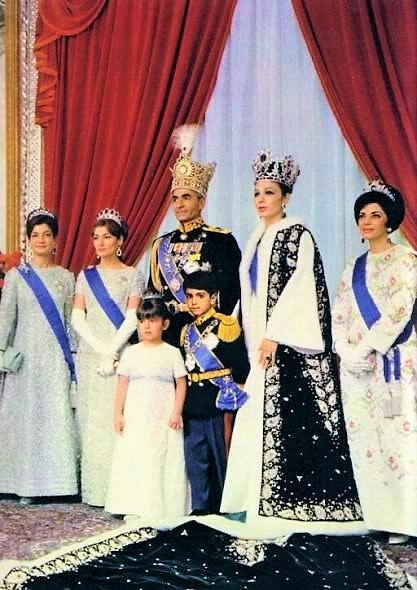
Shams Pahlavi

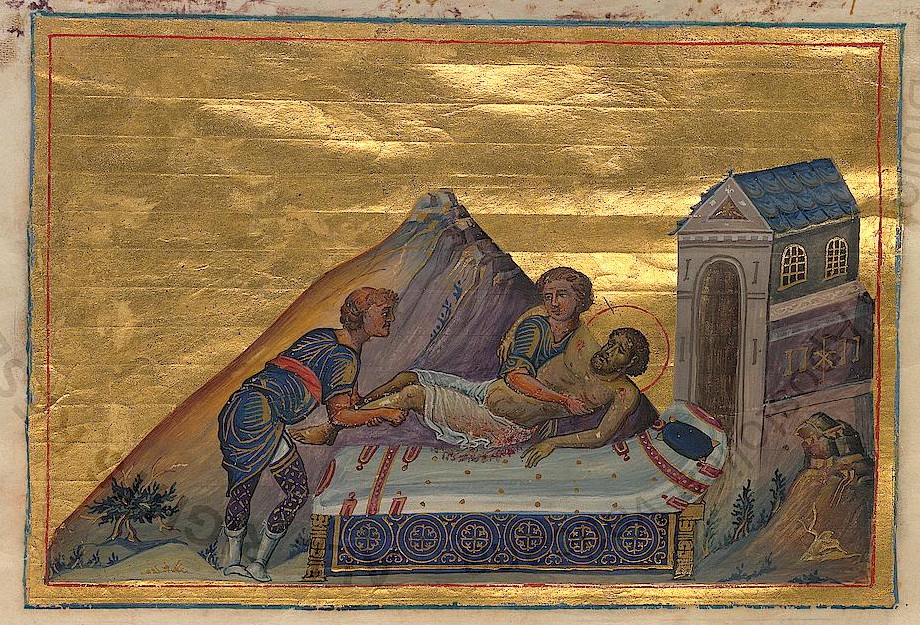
Abdas of Susa

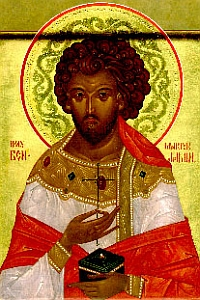
Saint Benjamin the Deacon and Martyr

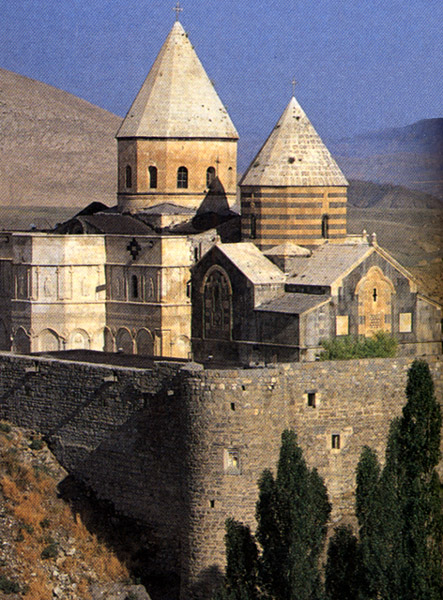
Armenian Monastery of Saint Taddeus, West Azerbaijan, Iran. Believed by some to have been first built in 66 AD by Saint Jude. Local Armenians believe that he and Simon were both buried here. In 1329, the church was reconstructed after an earthquake destroyed the structure in 1319.

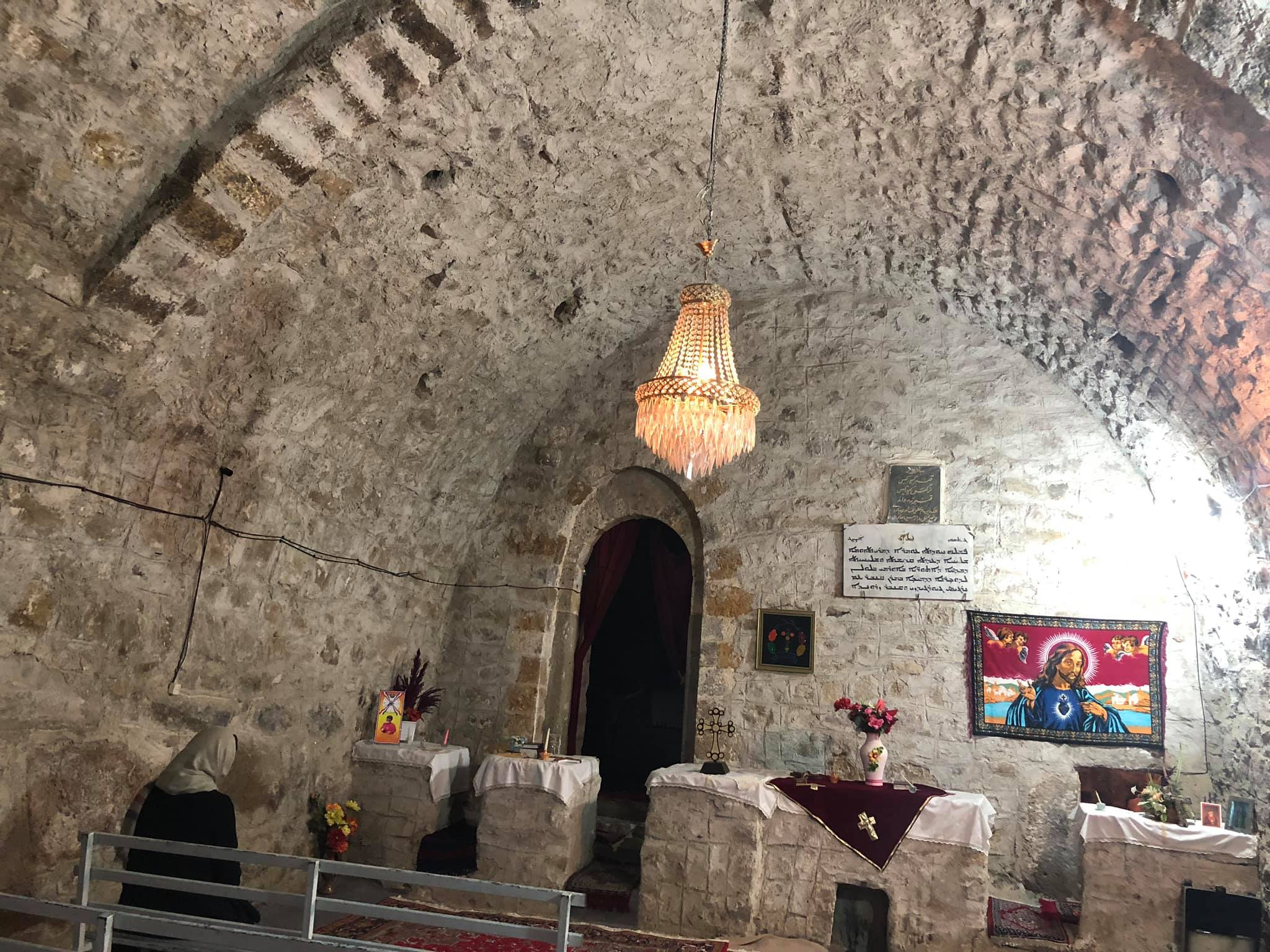
Assyrian Mar Toma church near Urmia, Iran.

According to the Acts of the Apostles there were Persians, Parthians and Medes among the first new Christian converts at Pentecost. Since then there has been a continuous presence of Christians in Iran.

During the apostolic age Christianity began to establish itself throughout the Mediterranean. However, a quite different Semitic-speaking Christian culture developed on the eastern borders of the Roman Empire and in Persia. Syriac Christianity owed much to preexistent Jewish communities and to the Aramaic language. This language had been spoken by Jesus, and, in various modern Eastern Aramaic forms is still spoken by the ethnic Assyrian Christians in Iran, northeast Syria, southeast Turkey and Iraq today (see Assyrian Neo-Aramaic, and Senaya language).

From Persian-ruled Assyria (Assuristan), missionary activity spread Eastern-Rite Syriac Christianity throughout Assyria and Mesopotamia, and from there into Persia, Asia Minor, Syria, the Caucasus and Central Asia, establishing the Saint Thomas Christians of India and erecting the Nestorian Stele and the Daqin Pagoda in China.

Early Christian communities straddling the Roman-Persian border found themselves in the midst of civil strife. In 313, when Constantine I proclaimed Christianity a tolerated religion in the Roman Empire, the Sassanid rulers of Persia adopted a policy of persecution against Christians, including the double-tax of Shapur II in the 340s. The Sassanids feared the Christians as a subversive and possibly disloyal minority. In the early-5th century official persecution increased once more. However, from the reign of Hormizd III (457–459) serious persecutions grew less frequent and the Persian church began to achieve a recognized status. Through the Battle of Avarayr (451) and the resultant treaty of 484, for example, the Persian Empire's numerous Armenian subjects gained the official right to profess Eastern Christianity freely. Ultimately, the many Christian martyrs in Persia came to be commemorated in Christian memory, including through a collection of texts of Syriac literature known as the Persian martyr acts. Political pressure within Persia and cultural differences with western Christianity were mostly to blame for the Nestorian schism, in the course of which the Roman Empire church hierarchy labelled the Church of the East heretical. The bishop of Ctesiphon (the capital of the Sassanid Empire) acquired the title first of catholicos, and then patriarch, completely independent of any Roman/Byzantine hierarchy.

Many old churches remain in Iran from the early days of Christianity. Some historians regard the Assyrian Church of Mart Maryam (St. Mary) in northwestern Iran, for example, as the second-oldest church in Christendom after the Church of Bethlehem in the West Bank. A Chinese princess, who contributed to its reconstruction in 642 AD, has her name engraved on a stone on the church wall. The famous Italian traveller Marco Polo also described the church following his visit.

The Arab Islamic conquest of Persia, in the 7th century, originally benefited Christians as they were a protected minority under Islam. However, from about the 10th century religious tension led to persecution once more. The influence of European Christians placed Near Eastern Christians in peril during the Crusades. From the mid-13th century, Mongol rule was a relief to Persian Christians until the Ilkhanate adopted Islam at the turn of the 14th century. The Christian population gradually declined to a small minority. Christians disengaged from mainstream society and withdrew into ethnic ghettos (mostly Assyrian and Armenian speaking). Persecution against Christians revived in the 14th century; when the Muslim warlord of Turco-Mongol descent Timur (Tamerlane) conquered Persia, Mesopotamia, Syria, and Asia Minor, he ordered large-scale massacres of Christians in Mesopotamia, Persia, Asia Minor and Syria. Most of the victims were indigenous Assyrians and Armenians, members of the Assyrian Church of the East and of Orthodox Churches.

In 1445 a part of the Sureth-speaking Church of the East entered into communion with the Catholic Church (mostly in the Ottoman Empire, but also in Persia). This group had a faltering start but has existed as a separate church since Pope Julius III consecrated Yohannan Sulaqa as Chaldean Patriarch of Babylon in 1553. Most Assyrian Catholics in Iran today are members of the Chaldean Catholic Church. The community that remains independent is the Assyrian Church of the East, but both churches now have much smaller memberships in Iran than the Armenian Apostolic Church.

The number of Christians in Iran was further significantly boosted through various policies of the subsequent kingdoms that ruled from 1501. For example, in 1606 during the Ottoman–Safavid War (1603–18), king Abbas I resettled some 300,000 Armenians deeper within modern-day Iran, as well as establishing their own quarter in the then-capital Isfahan, which is still largely populated by Christian Armenians some four centuries later: the New Julfa district. Other hundreds of thousands of Christian Georgians and Circassians were furthermore deported and resettled during the same Safavid era and in the later Qajar era within Iran, although both communities are exclusively Muslim nowadays.

In the 18th and 19th centuries, Protestant missionaries began to evangelize in Persia. They directed their operations towards supporting the extant churches of the country while improving education and health-care. Unlike the older, ethnic churches, these evangelical Protestants began to engage with the ethnic Persian Muslim community. Their printing presses produced much religious material in various languages. Some Persians subsequently converted to Protestantism and their churches still exist within Iran (using the Persian language).

A Russian spiritual mission was operating in Iran by the beginning of the 20th century and, by 1917, there were about fifty Russian Orthodox churches. Over the next three years, everything that had been created over the previous three centuries was lost. In the early 1940s, a Russian church reappeared in Iran thanks to the donations of Russian emigrants - St. Nicholas Cathedral, which was under the administration of the Russian Orthodox Church Outside of Russia. In the 1980s and 1990s, the church was gradually abandoned, and in 1995, at the request of its parishioners, St. Nicholas Church was annexed to the Moscow Patriarchate.

In the early 20th century, once again Iran's stable and extant Christian population was boosted – this time due to the effects of the Assyrian genocide (1914–1924) and the Armenian genocide (1914–1923), as many tens of thousands of refugees poured in. However, both massacres drastically negatively affected Iran's Christian population as well, as Ottoman troops crossed the Iranian border in the later stages of World War I and massacred many tens of thousands of Armenians and Assyrians within Iran's borders as well, especially in West Azerbaijan Province, but also in adjacent provinces. Vibrant, huge and millennia-old native Christian communities in these parts of Iran were virtually shattered by the Ottoman actions, being reduced from formerly composing majorities in some of the regions, to very small – though noticeable – surviving communities. Prior to World War I and the Assyrian genocide, the population of Urmia was 40% to 50% Christian, for example.

In 1918, during the Persian Campaign, about half of the Assyrians of Persia died in Turkish and Kurdish massacres and in related outbreaks of starvation and disease. About 80 percent of Assyrian clergy and spiritual leaders perished, threatening the nation's ability to survive as a unit.

== Current situation ==
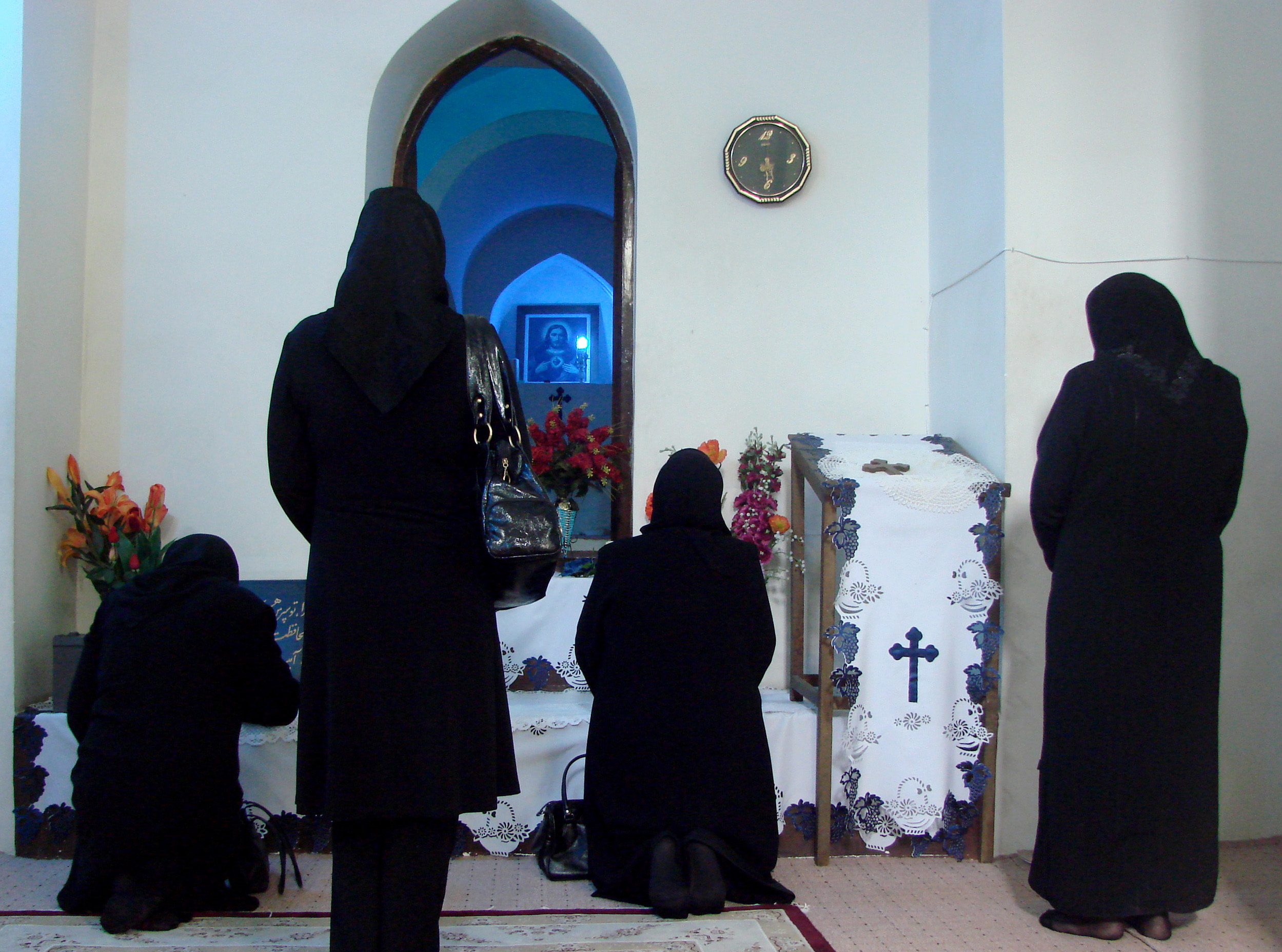
Assyrian women from Urmia praying in a church in 2009.

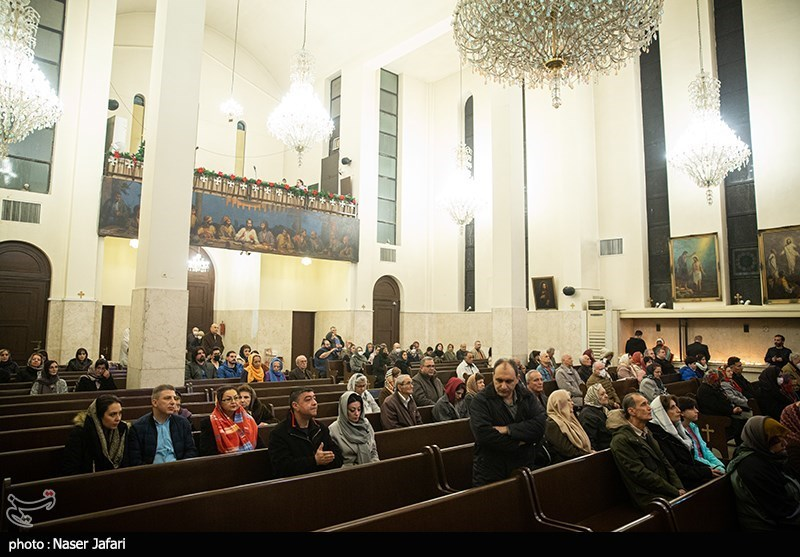
New Year's Eve celebrations at the Saint Sarkis Cathedral in Tehran, 2023

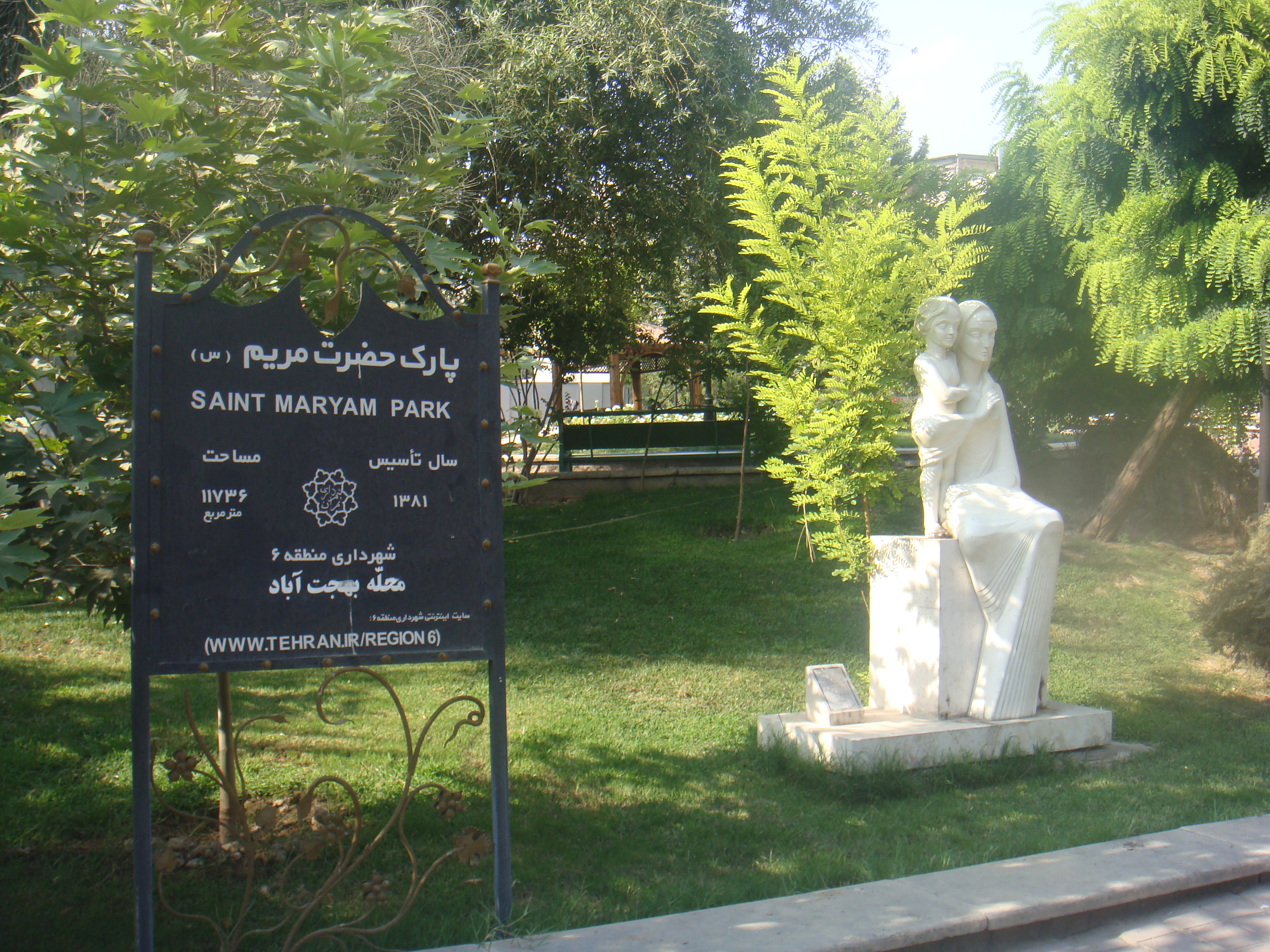
Saint Mary Park in Tehran (2011)

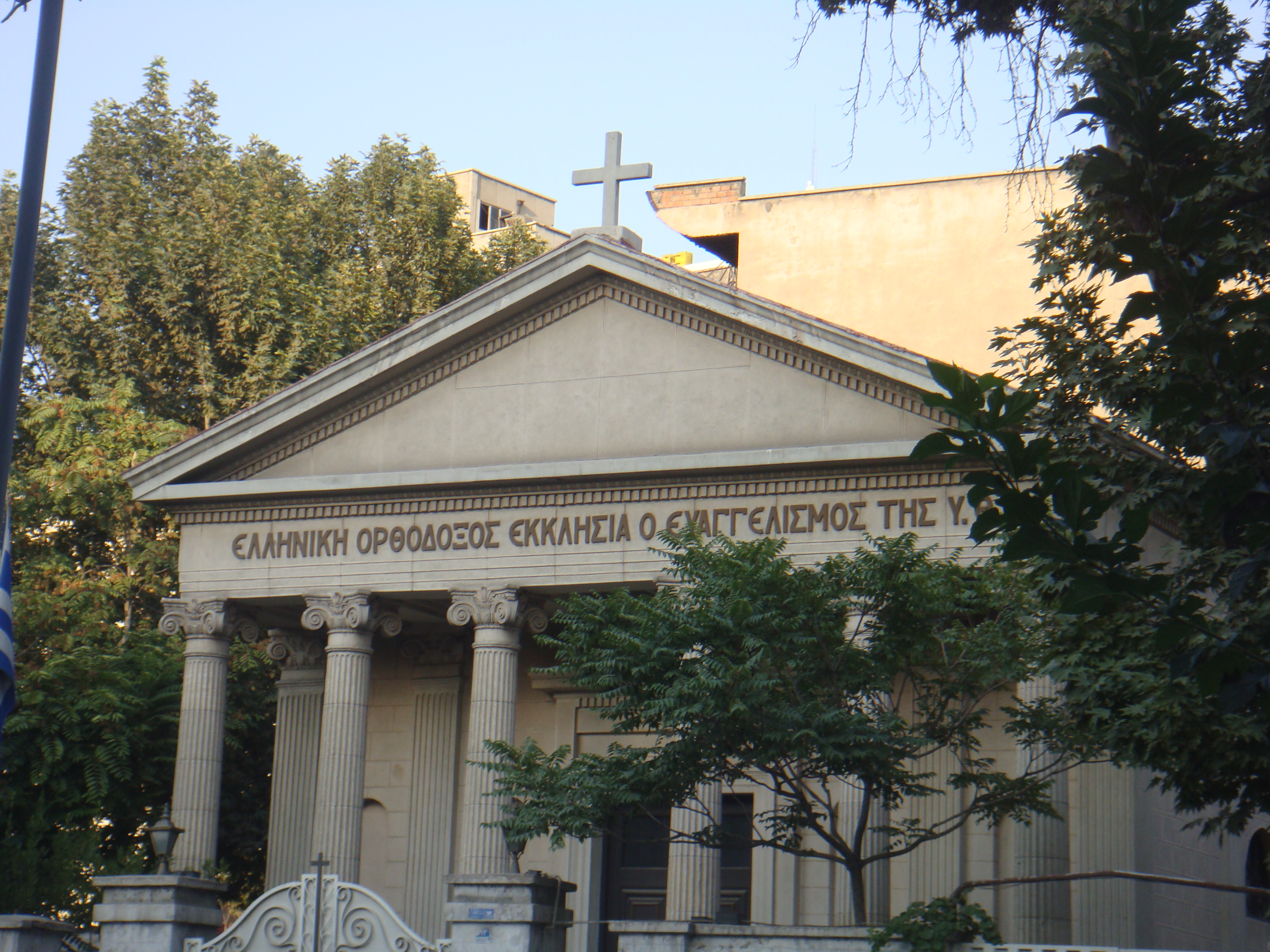
Greek church of Virgin Mary; Tehran

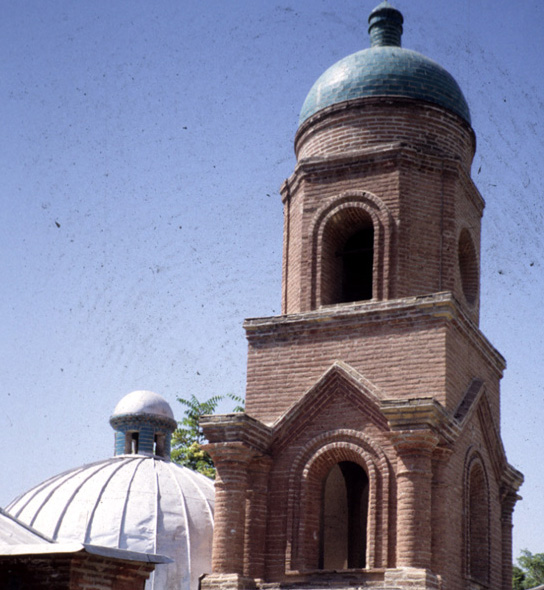
The Russian Church of Qazvin.

In 1976, the census reported that the Christian population of Iran holding citizenship there numbered 168,593 people, with most of them being Armenians. Due to the Iran–Iraq War in the 1980s and the dissolution of the Soviet Union in the 1990s, almost half of the Armenians migrated to the newly independent Armenia, but one estimate from 1999 placed the number as high as 310,000. Other estimates since 2000 have placed the number of Christians with Iranian citizenship as high as 109,415 in 2006.

Significant immigration of Assyrians from Iraq has been recorded during this period, due to massacres and harassment in post-Saddam Iraq. However, most of those Assyrians in Iran do not have Iranian citizenship, and therefore are not included in the data. In 2008, the central office of the International Union of Assyrians was officially transferred to Iran after being hosted in the United States for more than four decades.

Census	Total	Christians		+/−
Census	Total	#	%	+/−
1956	18,654,127	114,528	0.614%	
1966	24,771,922	149,427	0.603%	▲ +30%
1976	33,396,908	168,593	0.505%	▲ +13%
1986	49,445,010	97,557	0.197%	▼ −42%
1996	60,055,488	78,745	0.131%	▼ −19%
2006	70,097,741	109,415	0.156%	▲ +39%
2011	74,682,938	117,704	0.157%	▲ +8%
2016	79,598,054	130,158	0.163%	▲ +11%

On 2 February 2018, four United Nations human rights experts said that members of the Christian minority in Iran, particularly those who have converted to Christianity, are facing severe discrimination and religious persecution in Iran. They expressed their concerns over treatment of three Iranian Christians imprisoned in Iran.

Iranian Christians tend to be urban, with 50% living in Tehran.

Christianity remains the second-largest non-Muslim minority religion in the country.

A June 2020 online survey found a much smaller percentage of Iranians stating they believe in Islam, with half of those surveyed indicating they had lost their religious faith. The poll, conducted by the Netherlands-based GAMAAN (Group for Analyzing and Measuring Attitudes in Iran), using online polling to provide greater anonymity for respondents, surveyed 50,000 Iranians and found 1.5% identified as Christians.

== Christian converts from Islam ==
Beginning in the 1970s, some Protestant pastors started to hold church services in homes in Persian, rather than in one of the ethnic Christian minority languages such as Armenian or Syriac. One of the key leaders who spearheaded this movement was the Assemblies of God bishop Haik Hovsepian Mehr. Worship in homes rather than in church buildings, and the utilization of the national language (Persian), which was spoken by nearly all Iranians, combined with dissatisfaction at violence connected to the Iranian Revolution, led to substantial numbers of Iranian Muslims converting from Islam to Christianity. This took place both within Iran and abroad, among the Iranian diaspora. It is currently illegal to distribute Christian literature in the official language, Persian.

Muslims who change their faith to Christianity are subject to societal and official pressure which may lead to the death penalty. Although the Civil Code does not provide explicitly for the death penalty – with the crime being punishable by fines, lashing, and prison terms – judges can impose the death penalty if they desire. Iran was number nine on Open Doors’ 2022 World Watch List, an annual ranking of the 50 countries where Christians face the most extreme persecution.

Pentecostal pastor Hossein Sudmand was charged with apostasy and executed in 1990. Mehdi Dibaj was arrested and imprisoned for more than 10 years before he was sentenced to death in 1993, but after international pressure, he was freed in 1994, although the death sentence was not lifted. He was murdered the next year. In 2011, Youcef Nadarkhani, an Jammiat-e Rabbani pastor, was allegedly sentenced to death for refusing to recant his faith. More recently the Iranian-American pastor and former Muslim Saeed Abedini, who in 2013 was sentenced to eight years prison, allegedly "Helped to build the country's underground Christian church network". Satellite TV networks, such as Mohabat TV, Sat7 Pars, and TBN Nejat TV, distribute educational and encouraging programs for Christians, especially targeting Persian speakers. Some Christian ex-Muslims emigrate from Iran for educational, political, security or economic reasons.

It is difficult to obtain accurate figures for Protestants of all denominations and Catholics in Iran. Complicating the matter is the mixture of ethnic identity with religious affiliation, and the number of Muslim converts to Christianity, who as discussed above have a strong incentive to conceal themselves. Most informants often referred to "only a few thousand" in estimating the overall numbers of non-ethnic Christians in Iran. According to the data from the mid 1990s, all Protestant churches in Iran claimed an ethnic and Iranian membership of 5,000, 8,000, 10,000 or 15,000. A 2015 study estimated (describing this as a conservative estimate) that there were 100,000 Christian believers from a Muslim background living in Iran, most of them evangelical or Pentecostal Christians. Significant numbers of Muslim converts to Christianity in Iran are estimated to range from 300,000 to 500,000 by various sources. Other estimates put the numbers between 800,000 and 3 million.

According to scholar Ladan Boroumand, "Iran today is witnessing the highest rate of Christianization in the world." According to scholar Shay Khatiri of Johns Hopkins University, “Islam is the fastest shrinking religion in there [Iran], while Christianity is growing the fastest”, and in 2018 "up to half a million Iranians are Christian converts from Muslim families, and most of these Christians are evangelicals." He adds that "recent estimates claim that the number might have climbed up to somewhere between 1 million and 3 million".

In May 2019 Iran's Intelligence Minister Mahmoud Alavi expressed concern over Iranian Muslims converting to Christianity and said the Intelligence Ministry have dispatched agents active in "countering the advocates of Christianity" to areas where there is a potential for people to convert. In June 2024, it was reported that the Iranian judiciary sentenced five Christian converts to a total of over 25 years in prison.

== The Bible in languages of Iran ==
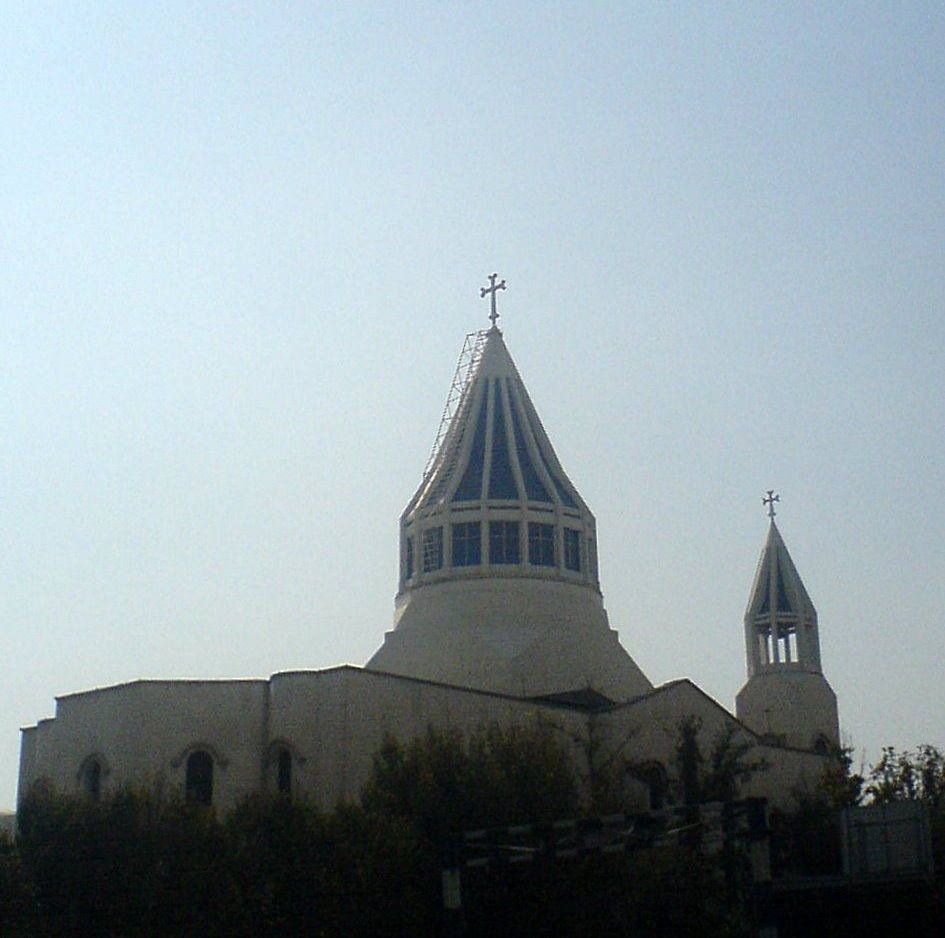
St. Sarkis Church, Tehran

Armenian and Assyrian Christians use Bibles in their own languages.

Multiple Persian translations and versions of the Bible have been translated in more recent times, although distribution of Christian literature in Persian is currently illegal.

Portions of the Bible are translated into Azeri, Mazanderani, Gilaki, Bakhtiari, Luri, Kurdish (Kurmanji and Sorani).

== Freedom of religion ==
In 2023, the country was given a score of zero out of four for religious freedom.

In the same year, it was ranked as the eighth most difficult place in the world to be a Christian.

== See also ==
- Catholic Church in Iran
- Christianity in the Safavid Empire
- German Speaking Evangelical Congregation in Iran
- Christians in the Persian Gulf
- Iranian Armenians
- Iranian Assyrians
- List of religious centers in Tehran#Churches
- Religion in Iran
