= Greek Orthodox Church of Saint Mary, Tehran =

Church in Iran

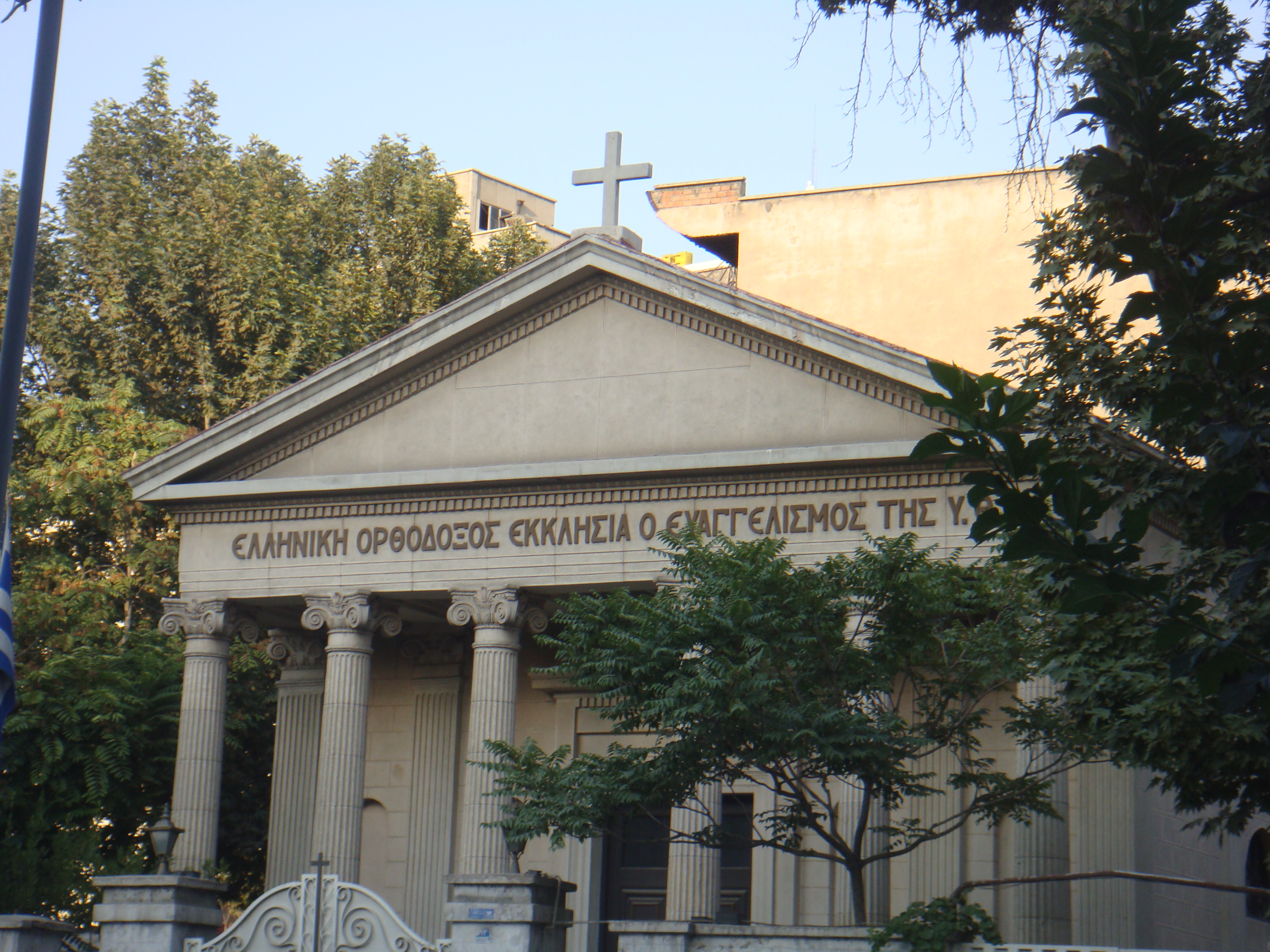
- Greek Orthodox Church of Saint Mary, Tehran
- Location: Tehran, Iran

History
- Founded: 1951

The Greek Orthodox Church of Saint Mary (Greek: Ελληνορθόδοξος ναός του Ευαγγελισμού της Θεοτόκου; Persian: کلیسای ارتدوکس یونانی سنت مری تهران), also known as the Greek Orthodox Church of the Annunciation of the Mother of God, is located in Tehran, Iran.

Inaugurated in 1951, it was founded to serve the once-vibrant Greek community of Tehran, which by the 1960s and 1970s, prior to the 1979 Iranian Revolution, numbered 3,000 people. When founded, the church was located at the intersection of the Roosevelt and Takht-e Jamshid streets. These streets were renamed Taleghani and Mofatteh respectively, after the Iranian Revolution.

== Sources ==
- Venetis, Evangelos (2018). "GREEKS IN MODERN IRAN". In Yarshater, Ehsan (ed.). Encyclopædia Iranica (Online ed.). Encyclopædia Iranica Foundation.
