= India–Iran relations =

Bilateral relations

- Iran: India

Diplomatic mission
- Embassy of Iran, New Delhi: Embassy of India, Tehran

Envoy
- Ambassador Dr. Mohammed Fathali: Ambassador Vishwesh Negi

The Republic of India and the Islamic Republic of Iran maintain a bilateral relationship. Independent India and Iran established diplomatic relations on 15 March 1950.

Contact between both ancient Persia and ancient India date to ancient times, and can be seen through the diffusion of Persian culture among the Islamic culture in much of South Asia; furthermore, around 15% of the Muslims in India are Shia, a group Iran considers itself to represent on the world stage. Outside the Islamic community, the impact of Persian culture has primarily been in northwest India.

During much of the Cold War, relations between India and the erstwhile Imperial State of Iran suffered due to their differing political interests: India endorsed a non-aligned position but fostered strong links with the Soviet Union, while Iran was an open member of the Western Bloc and enjoyed close ties with the United States. While India did not welcome the 1979 Islamic Revolution, relations between the two states strengthened momentarily in its aftermath. However, Iran's continued support for Pakistan in the India–Pakistan conflict and India's close relations with Iraq during the Iran–Iraq War greatly strained bilateral ties.

In the 1990s, both India and Iran supported the Northern Alliance against the Taliban in Afghanistan, who received overt Pakistani backing and ruled most of the country until the 2001 United States-led invasion. They continued to collaborate in supporting the broad-based anti-Taliban government led by Ashraf Ghani and backed by the international community, until the Taliban captured Kabul in 2021 and re-established the Islamic Emirate of Afghanistan. India and Iran signed a defence cooperation agreement in December 2002.

From an economic perspective, Iran was historically the third largest supplier of petroleum to India, but its exports to India have fallen dramatically in the 2010s. India stopped oil imports from Iran in 2019 due to pressure from the Trump administration, having previously imported only a negligible amount. Instead, China has become the largest importer of Iranian oil, accounting for 90% of Iranian oil exports. India only purchased Iranian oil and liquefied natural gas once in seven years, in 2026.

From a geopolitical perspective, despite the two countries having some common strategic interests, India and Iran differ significantly on key foreign policy issues. India has expressed strong opposition to Iran's nuclear program and while both nations continue to oppose the Taliban, India supported the presence of NATO-led forces in Afghanistan, unlike Iran. India has also consistently voiced stronger support for Israel than for Iran in the 2020s. Due to the long history of geopolitical conflict between the two regions, including imperialism, and the cultural and religious differences between both communities, Iran is often a target for the Hindu right wing. Conversely, India is often accused by Iran of engaging in Islamophobia and racism.

== History ==
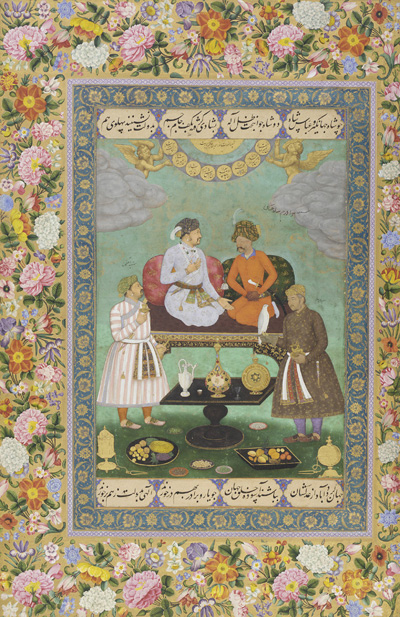
Mughal Emperor Jahangir meets Shah Abbas I c.1620

The Indian subcontinent and Iranian plateau are adjacent geographical regions, and ancient India and ancient Iran have had relations dating back millennia. During the Middle Ages, there was a fusion of medieval Persian culture in India that can be seen in Muslim Indian culture, especially from the Delhi Sultanate till the period of Mughal Hindustan.

In the modern era, after the Partition of India in 1947, the newly independent India no longer abutted the State of Iran, although the relations between both nations remained healthy.

== Current relations ==
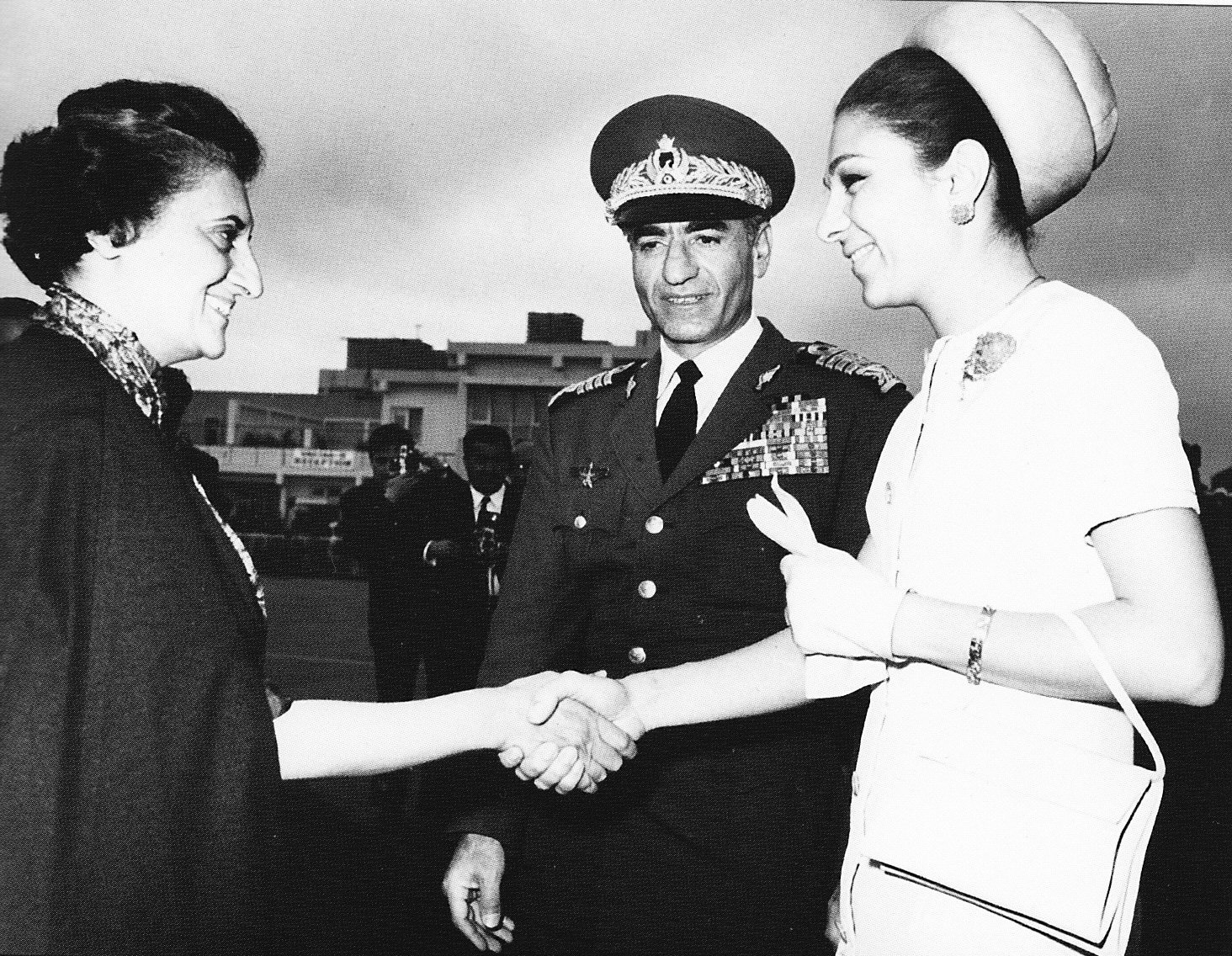
Empress Farah Pahlavi and Emperor Mohammad Reza Pahlavi met India's Prime Minister Indira Gandhi during a state visit to India in 1970.

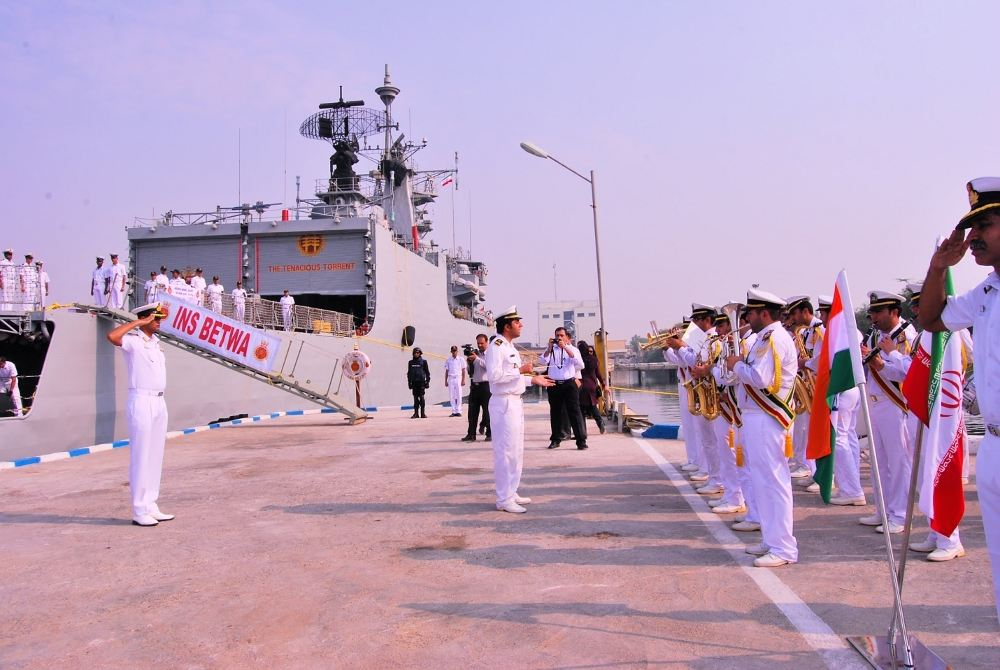
The Iranian Navy Band playing the Indian National Anthem during a ceremonial parade at Bandar-e-Abbas port; 28 August 2015

India and Iran have friendly relations in many areas, despite India not welcoming the 1979 Revolution. There are significant trade ties, particularly in crude oil imports into India and diesel exports to Iran. Iran has frequently objected to Pakistan's attempts to draft anti-India resolutions at international organisations such as the OIC and the Human Rights Commission. India welcomed Iran's inclusion as an observer state in the SAARC regional organisation. A growing number of Iranian students are enrolled at universities in India, most notably in Pune and Bengaluru. The clerical government in Tehran sees itself as a leader of Shiites worldwide, including in India. Indian Shiites enjoy state support such as a recognised national holiday for Muharram. Lucknow continues to be a major centre of Shiite culture and Persian study in the subcontinent.

In the 1990s, India and Iran supported the Northern Alliance in Afghanistan against the Taliban regime. They continued to collaborate in supporting the broad-based anti-Taliban government led by Ashraf Ghani and backed by the United States between 2004 and 2021. The two countries signed a defence cooperation agreement in December 2002.

In 2010, Iran's Supreme Leader, Ayatollah Ali Khamenei, appealed to Muslims worldwide to back the freedom struggle in Kashmir. India, in turn, summoned the acting Iranian ambassador in New Delhi to lodge a formal protest.

In August 2013, while carrying oil in the Persian Gulf, Iran detained India's largest ocean liner, the Shipping Corporation (SCI)'s vessel MT Desh Shanti, carrying crude oil from Iraq. Iran insisted the detention of the tanker was "a technical and non-political issue".

On 22 May 2016, Indian Prime minister Narendra Modi paid an official visit to Iran. The visit focused on bilateral connectivity and infrastructure, an energy partnership, and trade.

Just before Modi's visit to Israel in July 2017, Ayatollah Khamenei urged the Muslims in Kashmir to "repudiate oppressors".

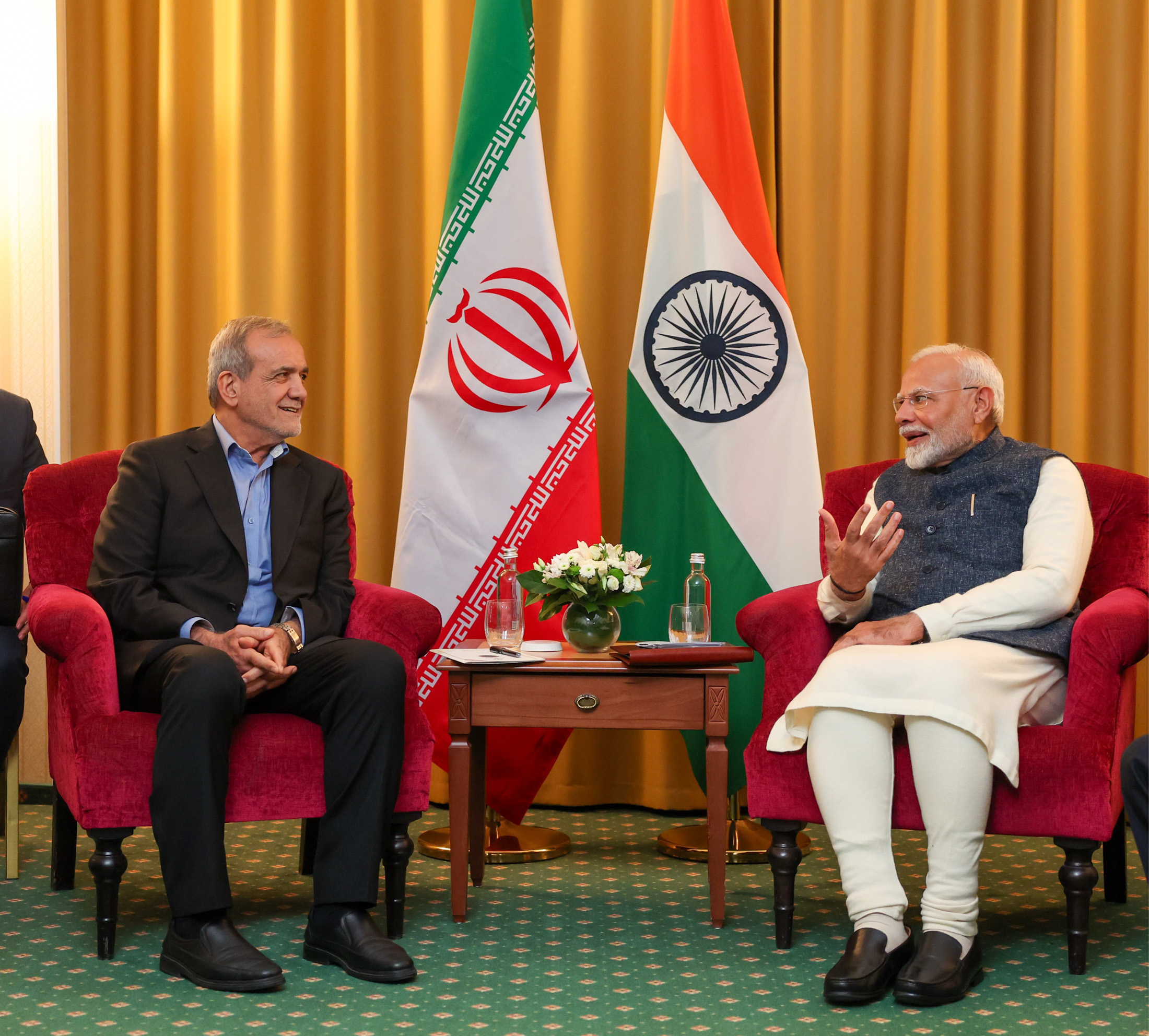
Iranian President Masoud Pezeshkian meeting Indian Prime Minister Narendra Modi at the 16th BRICS summit in Kazan, Russia, 22 October 2024

In May 2024, India reportedly signed a 10-year contract with Iran to develop the Chabahar Port.

In September 2024, Khamenei raised the issue of the "suffering" of Muslims in India; his comments were subsequently condemned by the Indian Ministry of External Affairs, which called on Iran to "look at [its] own record" on minority rights.

On 23 January 2026, India voted against a UN Human Rights Council resolution condemning the violent suppression of anti-government protests in Iran.

On 5 March 2026, Foreign Secretary Vikram Misri visited the Iranian embassy in India, and extended his condolences on the demise of Iran's Supreme leader Ayatollah Ali Khamenei.

== Geopolitical relations ==
=== Iran's nuclear interests ===
India, despite close relations and some convergence of interests with Iran, voted against Iran in the International Atomic Energy Agency in 2005, which took Iran by surprise. The Iranian politician Ali Larijani was reported as saying: "India was our friend". Stephen Rademaker also acknowledged that India's votes against Iran at the International Atomic Energy Agency were "coerced":

"The best illustration of this is the two votes India cast against Iran at the IAEA. I am the first person to admit that the votes were coerced."

The US considers support from India – which is on the 35-member board of Governors at the IAEA – crucial in getting a sizeable majority for its proposal to refer the matter to the Security Council for punitive action against Iran. Greg Schulte, US ambassador to the IAEA, said: "India's voice will carry particular weight... I hope India joins us in making clear our collective concerns about Iran's nuclear program". Schulte did not deny that the Indo-US nuclear deal was conditional to India supporting the US on the Iran issue. Appraising the situation vis-à-vis Iran, a senior US official told the New York Times that "the Indians are emerging from their non-aligned status and becoming a global power, and they have to begin to think about their responsibilities. They have to make a basic choice." The Bush administration, however, recognized India's close relations with Iran and tempered its position, stating that India can "go ahead with a pipeline deal involving Iran and Pakistan. Our beef is with Iran, not the pipeline."

== Triangular relations ==
=== Pakistan ===
India–Iran relations, shaped by shared strategic interests and regional connectivity goals, have long served as a counterbalance to Pakistan’s influence in the region. Unlike Islamabad, Tehran has supported New Delhi's ambitions, notably by facilitating access to Afghanistan and Central Asia through the Chabahar Port and the International North-South Transport Corridor (INSTC). For India, Iran’s Shia-led regime provides a geopolitical counterweight to Sunni extremism backed by Pakistan's military and intelligence agencies. Historically, Iran even shielded India from international censure over Kashmir at the Organisation of Islamic Cooperation in 1994, refusing to back a Pakistan-driven resolution that was reportedly backed by some western countries at the United Nations Human Rights Commission.

In July 2025, the Iranian Embassy in India publicly warned of a coordinated misinformation campaign aimed at damaging India–Iran relations, allegedly orchestrated through fake social media accounts—some of which appeared to originate from Pakistan. These impersonator accounts, posing as official Iranian institutions and even displaying verification badges, spread false claims such as Iran reconsidering the Chabahar Port agreement with India. The embassy, via its official X (formerly Twitter) handle, released screenshots of the fake profiles and labelled them as deliberate attempts to mislead the public and sow discord between the two nations.

=== United States ===
American pressure has limited India's relationship with Iran.

== Economic relations ==
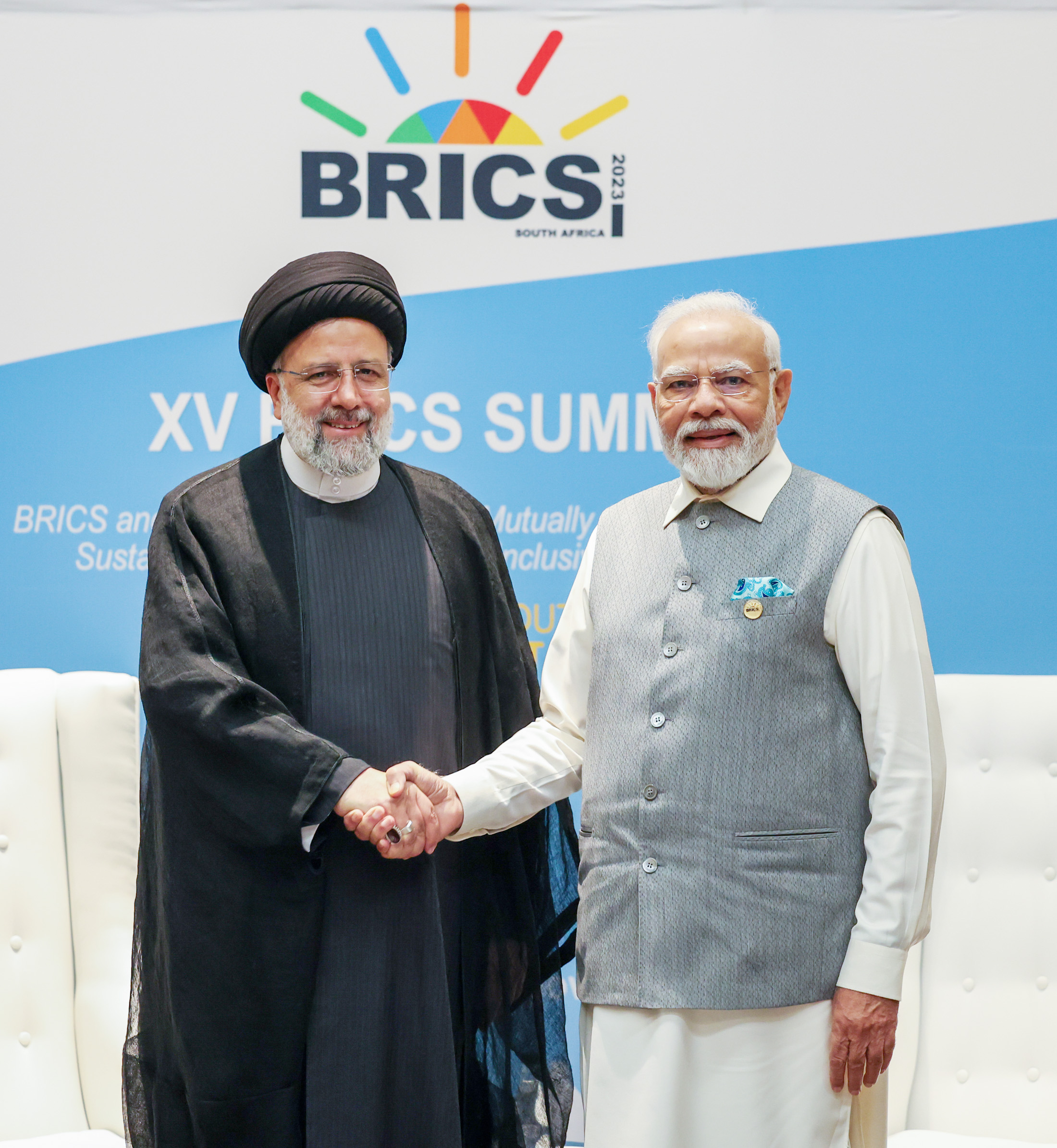
Indian Prime Minister Narendra Modi with former Iranian President Ebrahim Raisi during the 15th BRICS summit in Johannesburg, South Africa, 24 August 2023

=== Oil and gas ===
In 2008–09, Iranian oil accounted for nearly 16.5% of India's crude oil imports, making Iran India's second largest oil supplier after a 9.5% increase in imports that year. Approximately 40% of India's refined oil was also imported from Iran.

In June 2009, Indian oil companies announced plans to invest US$5 billion in developing an Iranian gas field in the Persian Gulf. However, by September 2009, Pakistani diplomatic sources reported that "India definitely quitted the IPI gas pipeline deal," favoring the India–United States Civil Nuclear Agreement instead. Iranian officials disputed this claim.

In 2010, US officials warned that Indian companies using the Asian Clearing Union (ACU) for Iranian transactions risked violating US legislation and being barred from US markets. The US criticized the ACU for lacking transparency and suspected it was being used to funnel assets to blacklisted organizations like the Islamic Revolutionary Guard Corps. On 27 November 2010, the Reserve Bank of India instructed lenders to cease processing Iran transactions through the ACU and declared it would not facilitate payments for Iranian crude imports. Despite these restrictions, India objected to additional American sanctions that year.

By 2012, sanctions led to a significant reduction in oil imports from Iran. From 2012 to 2013, Iranian imports stabilized around 250,000 barrels per day, actually increasing proportionally as European imports ceased. In August 2013, Iran detained an Indian tanker, though this was unrelated to the oil embargo.

In 2014, India planned to increase Iranian imports by 11 million tons following a 180-day US sanctions waiver, aiming to save over US$8.5 billion in hard currency. In March 2022, Iran's ambassador to India stated the country was ready to meet India's energy security demands as sanctions removal talks continued.

=== Infrastructure ===
The Chabahar port has also been jointly financed by Iran and India. India alone plans to invest 20 Billion US dollars towards development of Chabahar port. India is helping develop the Chabahar Port, which will give it access to the oil and gas resources in Iran and the Central Asian states. By so doing, India hopes to compete with the Chinese, who are building Gwadar Port, in Pakistan's Balochistan. Iran plans to use Chabahar for trans-shipment to Afghanistan and Central Asia, while keeping the port of Bandar Abbas as a major hub mainly for trade with Russia and Europe. India, Iran and Afghanistan have signed an agreement to give Indian goods, heading for Central Asia and Afghanistan, preferential treatment and tariff reductions at Chabahar.

Work on the Chabahar-Milak-Zaranj-Delaram route from Iran to Afghanistan began following a trilateral MoU in 2003. Iran is, with Indian aid, upgrading the Chabahar-Milak road and constructing a bridge on the route to Zaranj. A highway between Zaranj and Delaram (Zaranj-Delaram Highway) was built with financial support from India; India's BRO laid the 213 km road. In January 2009 the road was handed over to Afghanistan by India.

Along with Bandar Abbas, Chabahar is the Iranian entrepot on the north–south corridor. A strategic partnership between India, Iran and Russia is intended to establish a multi-modal transport link connecting Mumbai with St Petersburg, providing Europe and the former Soviet republics of Central Asia access to Asia and vice versa.

==== North-South Transport Corridor ====
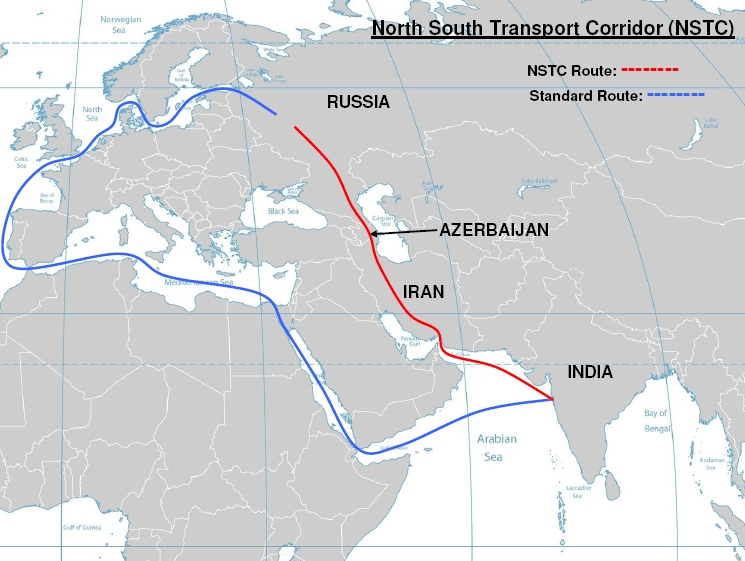
North South Transport Corridor route via India, Iran, Azerbaijan and Russia

The North–South Transport Corridor is the ship, rail, and road route for moving freight between India, Russia, Iran, Europe, the Caucasus, and Central Asia. The route primarily involves moving freight from India, Iran, Azerbaijan and Russia via ship, rail and road. The objective of the corridor is to increase trade connectivity between major cities such as Mumbai, Moscow, Tehran, Baku, Bandar Abbas, Astrakhan, and Bandar Anzali. Dry runs of two routes were conducted in 2014, the first was Mumbai to Baku via Bandar Abbas and the second was Mumbai to Astrakhan via Bandar Abbas, Tehran and Bandar Anzali. The objective of the study was to identify and address key bottlenecks. The results showed transport costs were reduced by "$2,500 per 15 tons of cargo". Other routes under consideration include via Armenia, Kazakhstan and Turkmenistan.

== Cultural relations ==
=== Education ===
There are about 8,000 Iranian students studying in India. India provides 67 scholarships every year to Iranian students under ITEC, ICCR, Colombo Plan and IOR-ARC schemes. Every year around 40,000 Iranians visit India for various purposes.

Kendriya Vidyalaya Tehran, the Embassy of India School, serves Indian citizens living in Tehran.

=== Religion ===
The world's largest population of Zoroastrians are the Parsi community in India. During the Arab conquest of Persia, many Zoroastrians moved to the western coast of India and as a result the country has the largest population of Zoroastrians in the world. In the modern era, the Parsi community have contributed significantly to India in the areas of politics, industry, science and culture. Prominent Indian Parsis include Dadabhai Naoroji (three times president of Indian National Congress), Field Marshal Sam Manekshaw, nuclear energy scientist Homi Bhabha, industrialist JRD Tata and the Tata family. The rock star Freddie Mercury (lead singer of the band Queen) was an Indian Parsi born in Zanzibar. Zubin Mehta, a conductor of Western classical music orchestras, is also a Parsi originally from Mumbai.

=== Sports ===
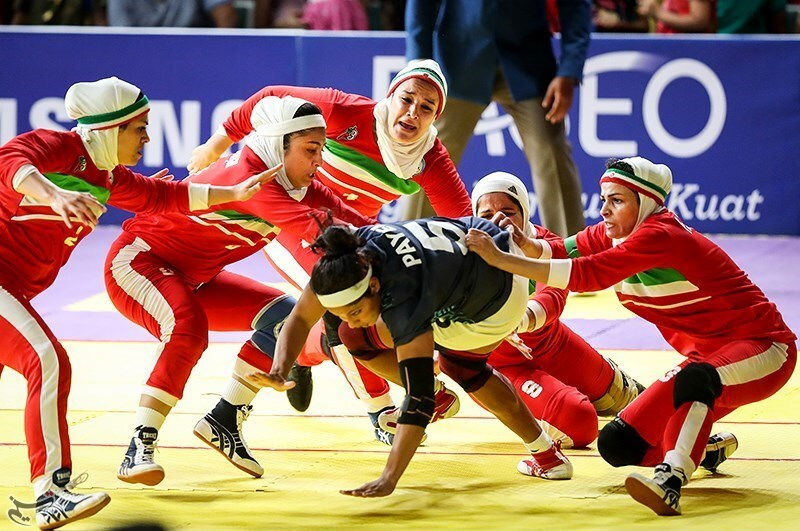
The Iranian women's team won the 2018 Asian Games kabaddi final against India

India and Iran have both been playing kabaddi (known in Iran as zuu) for thousands of years.

In kho kho (a traditional Indian game), the Iran men's national team secured third place at the 2025 World Cup.

== See also ==
- Foreign Relations of Iran
- Foreign relations of India
- Irani
- Indians in Iran
- Iran-Pakistan-India gas pipeline
- Ibn Sina Academy of Medieval Medicine and Sciences
- Buddhism in Iran
- Hinduism in Iran
- Indo-Iranian languages
