= Indians in Iran =

Regions with significant populations
- Tehran, Zahidan, Abadan

Languages
- Malayalam, Hindi, Kannada, Gujarati, Persian, Telugu

Religion
- Baháʼí · Buddhism · Christianity · Hinduism · Islam · Sikhism · Zoroastrianism

Related ethnic groups
- Desi, Indian diaspora

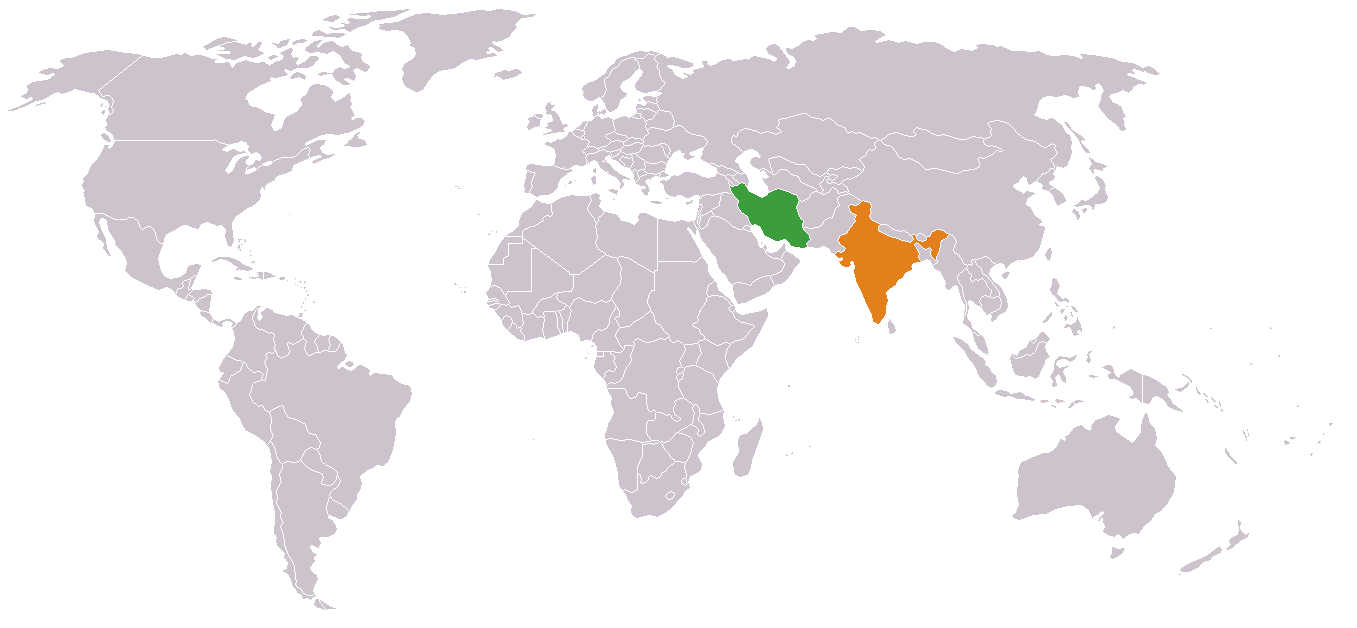
Map

There have been several waves of migration from India to Iran since the 1800s.

== History ==
Between the late 19th and early 20th centuries, many wealthy Parsis in India began to travel to Iran from Bombay and Gujarat, to revive the Zoroastrian faith and traditions among the stagnating Zoroastrian community in Iran at the time, with prominent personalities such as civil rights activist Manekji Limji Hateria of Surat gaining local renown.

In the 1920s, about 180 Indian families went to Zahidan. Following this initial influx, some of them started settling down in the nearby towns of Birijand, Zabol and Mashhad. In the 1950s, more Indians migrated to Iran and settled primarily in Tehran. They consisted primarily of Punjabis and Gujaratis. In the 1960s and early 1970s, about 10,000 Indian doctors, engineers, and teachers moved to Iran as a response to the open policies initiated by the Shah of Iran, but most of them left Iran after the Iranian revolution.

Today, over 4,000 non-resident Indians reside in Iran.

== See also ==
- People
  - India–Iran relations
- Religion
  - Hinduism in Iran
  - Sikhism in Iran
  - Zoroastrianism in India (Parsees), 7th century onwards Iranian Zoroastrians emigrants to India escaping persecution by Islamists in Iran
  - Iranis (India), 19th and 20th century Iranian Zoroastrians emigrants to India escaping persecution by Islamists in Iran
  - Baháʼí Faith in India, 20th century Iranian Baháʼí emigrants to India escaping persecution by Islamists in Iran
- Kushan Empire
- Greater India
- Hindush
