= Hinduism in Iran =

Total population
- 39,200▲ (2015),0.05% Of Total Population

Regions with significant populations
- Bandar Abbas • Zahedan • Tehran

Religions
- Hinduism

Languages
- Punjabi • Persian • Balochi • Hindi

Related ethnic groups
- Indians in Iran and Hindus

Hinduism is a minor religion in Iran. As of 2015, there were 39,200 Hindus residing in Iran.

Two Hindu temples were built by the Arya Samaj, one in Bandar Abbas and one in Zahedan, both funded by Indian merchants in the late 19th century.

A.C. Bhaktivedanta Swami Prabhupada traveled to Tehran in 1976. Since 1977, ISKCON runs a vegetarian restaurant in Tehran.

== Demographics ==
Historical Population
| Year | Pop. | ±% |
|---|---|---|
| 2010 | 20,000 | — |
| 2015 | 39,200 | +96.0% |

| Year | Percent | Increase |
|---|---|---|
| 2010 | 0.02% | - |
| 2015 | 0.05% | +0.03% |

In 2010, there were about 20,000 Hindus in Iran which increased to 39,200 in 2015.

== History ==
The history of Hinduism in Iran is a rich and complex narrative that spans several millennia, reflecting the interaction between ancient Iran and the Indian subcontinent, as well as the migration of Indian communities into Iranian territory. Hinduism in Iran has been influenced by a variety of social, cultural, and political factors, including trade, the spread of religious ideas, and the establishment of Indian communities in Iran over time.

=== Early Contacts and Influence ===
Hinduism’s historical connections with Iran trace back to the early Indo-Iranian period, when both regions were inhabited by peoples speaking Indo-European languages. The ancient Indo-Iranian peoples, who later split into the Vedic-speaking Aryans of India and the Iranian-speaking peoples, shared many religious and cultural traditions. Early references to Vedic religious practices and deities appear in the Avesta, the sacred texts of Zoroastrianism, which show linguistic and thematic affinities with Hindu scriptures.

The Rigveda mentions the airya (Aryans), who may have had contact with the Iranian plateau before their divergence into separate cultural and religious paths. The Avesta also contains numerous parallels with the Vedic hymns, such as the figure of Mithra, a prominent god in both Hindu and Zoroastrian traditions. These similarities suggest a shared religious heritage before the distinct development of Zoroastrianism and Hinduism in their respective regions.

=== Ancient Persia and Hindu Influence ===
Throughout ancient Iranian history, particularly during the Achaemenid Empire (circa 550–330 BCE), there was substantial interaction between the Iranian and Indian subcontinents. Trade routes such as the Silk Road facilitated the exchange of goods, ideas, and cultural influences. Hinduism, though not dominant, likely influenced the religious and philosophical milieu of ancient Iran.

During the reign of Darius the Great (522–486 BCE), Indian merchants were known to have traveled to Persia, and there are accounts of interactions between Indian sages and Persian courts. While Zoroastrianism remained the dominant religion of the Achaemenid Empire, Indian religious practices and ideas were undoubtedly present in Iranian society, particularly through trade and intellectual exchange.

A metal plate depicting an elephant-headed figure, similar to the Hindu deity Ganesha, was discovered in Lorestan Province, Iran, This metal plate has been dated to between 1200 BCE and 1000 BCE.

=== Medieval and Early Modern Period ===
Hinduism’s presence in Iran was further solidified during the medieval period through the expansion of trade, particularly after the Islamic conquests of Persia in the 7th century CE. While Islam eventually became the dominant religion in Iran, there were significant Hindu communities in Iran, especially in the regions of Kerman and Yazd, which were part of the trade routes linking India and the Middle East.

The influence of Indian traders and migrants in Iran increased during the Safavid dynasty (1501–1736), when Iran established extensive trade links with India. Indian merchants, soldiers, and artisans migrated to Iran, and small Hindu communities began to establish themselves in cities such as Isfahan and Tehran. These early communities were often involved in commerce, and their religious practices continued to be shaped by the Indian subcontinent’s traditions.

=== Modern Era ===
In the modern period, particularly during the Qajar dynasty (1789–1925), and into the Pahlavi era (1925–1979), there were significant migrations of Hindus to Iran. Many of these migrants came as a result of trade and diplomatic ties between Iran and British India, which included the movement of professionals, diplomats, and laborers. During this period, small but established Hindu communities could be found in the major cities of Iran, notably in Tehran, Isfahan, and Kerman.

The British colonial presence in India and the establishment of the British Indian community in Iran played a crucial role in strengthening these connections. Additionally, the presence of Parsi (Zoroastrian) and other South Asian religious groups in Iran contributed to the diversity of religious traditions in the region.

After the Islamic Revolution of 1979, the political and social landscape in Iran changed significantly. The new Islamic government led by Ayatollah Khomeini implemented policies that restricted religious freedoms, and the country’s religious composition shifted further toward Islam. Despite these challenges, small Hindu communities remained in Iran, particularly in areas with historical trade ties to India.

== Contemporary Hinduism in Iran ==
Today, the Hindu community in Iran is small but significant. Most Hindus in Iran are descendants of earlier migrant populations, including merchants, diplomats, and workers who arrived during the 19th and early 20th centuries. The majority of Iran's Hindus live in Tehran, Isfahan, and Kerman, and they maintain places of worship, primarily temples dedicated to Hindu deities such as Shiva, Vishnu, and Durga.

While the number of Hindus in Iran is relatively small—estimated to be under 10,000—there are active religious, cultural, and social organizations that support the community’s needs. The Hindu Temple of Isfahan and the Hindu Temple of Tehran are two of the most well-known temples, where religious practices and festivals, such as Diwali, are celebrated by the community.

In recent years, there has been a renewed interest in the cultural and religious heritage of Hinduism in Iran, as well as a growing dialogue between Iran and India. Although Hinduism is a minority religion in Iran, its historical presence is acknowledged as part of the larger cultural and religious fabric of the country.

== List of Hindu temples ==
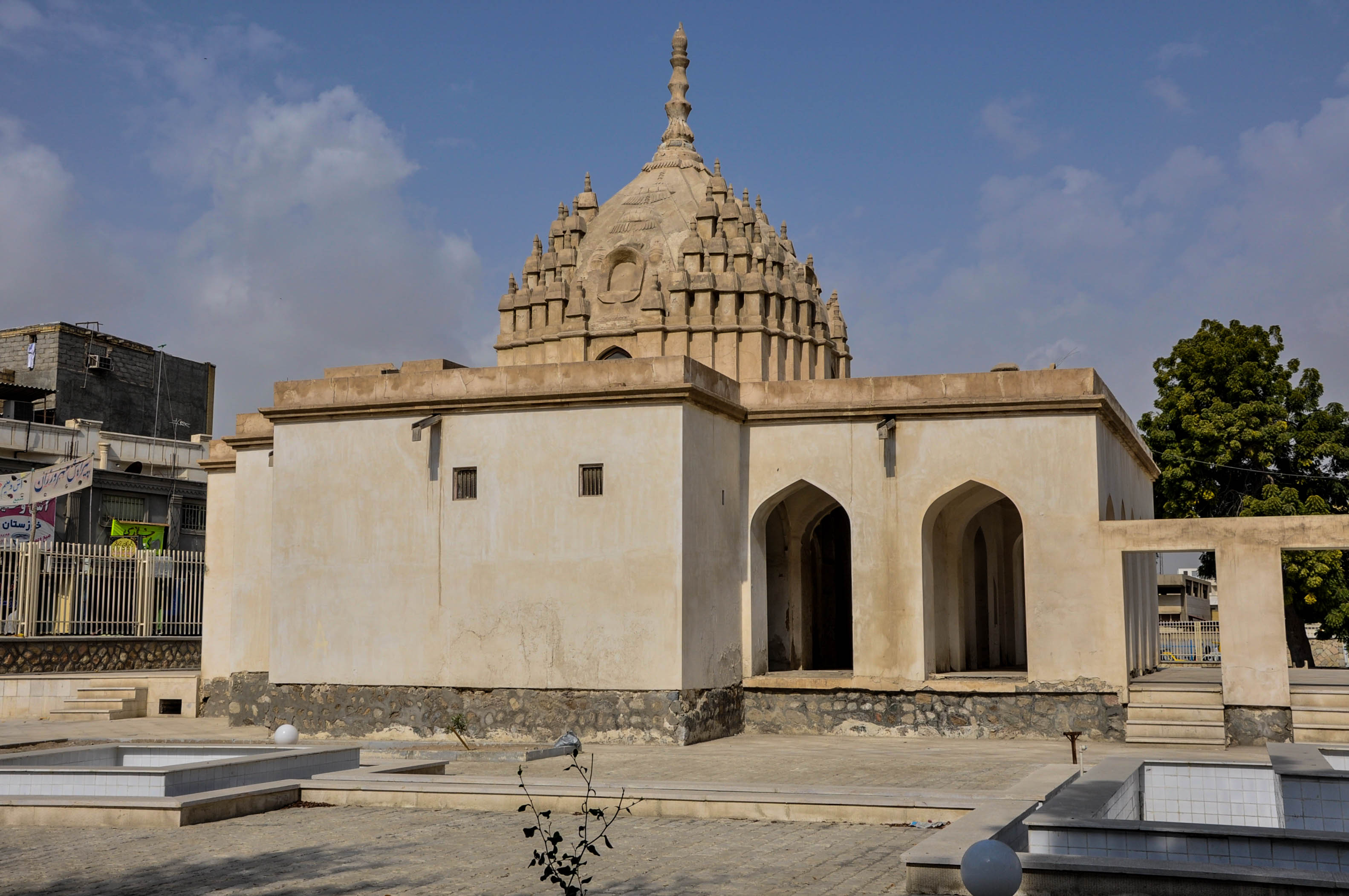
Bandar Abbas Vishnu Temple

The following list are of the notable Hindu temples in Iran: Some of the temples have been re-assigned for other uses by the Iranian authorities, and the Government of India has never made an attempt to pursue restoration.

- Bushehr province
  - Bushehr
    - Shiva Temple of Bushehr: built by Hindu merchants during British colonial era in the port city of Bushehr.
- Fars Province
  - Shiraz
    - Hindu Temple of Shiraz: Built during Qajar dynasty.
- Hormozgan province
  - Bandar Abbas
    - Bandar Abbas Vishnu Temple (Bet Gur Hindu Temple, built 1892 CE or 1310 AH): built by Hindu merchants at Pasdaran Boulevard in the Shahrak-e Beheshti area near Imam Khomeini Street in the city centre, funded by the Indian merchants, built by Arya Samaj in the late 19th century , but currently used as the Anthropology Museum of the Persian Gulf though wall paintings and statues of Hindu deities (such as Lord Krishna) are still visible inside the temple. near Bandar Abbas city center near Imam Khomeini Street of Charahrah Barq.
- Isfahan province
  - Isfahan
    - Hindu Temple of Isfahan: built during the Safavid era.
- Kerman province
  - Kerman:
    - Hindu Temple of Kerman: built in 19th by Hindu merchants.
- Khuzestan province
  - Ahvaz
    - Hindu Temple of Ahvaz
- Razavi Khorasan province
  - Mashhad:
    - Hindu Temple of Mashhad: built in the city of Mashhad which is also an important pilgrimage site for Shia Muslims.
- Sistan and Baluchestan province
  - Chabahar
    - Hindu Temple of Chabahar: built by Hindu merchants from Gujarat during British colonial era with intricate stone reliefs, Persian arches, and Indian shikhara (spire).
  - Zahedan:
    - Arya Samaj Temple of Zahedan: built by Indian merchants in the late 19th century in the inland city of Zahedan.
- Tehran province
  - Tehran city:
    - Hindu Temple of Tehran: built during colonial era.
    - ISKON Temple of Tehran: A.C. Bhaktivedanta Swami Prabhupada traveled to Tehran in 1976 and since 1977 ISKCON runs a vegetarian restaurant in Tehran.
- Yazd province
  - Yazd
    - Hindu Temple of Yazd: built in late 19th century by Hindu merchants in Yazd - a city also known for its pre-Islamic Zoroastrian heritage.

== See also ==
- Zoroastrianism in India
- Religious freedom in Iran
- Religion in Iran
- Buddhism in Iran
- Sikhism in Iran
- Mansour al-Hallaj
