= Baharestan Palace =

Government building in Tehran, Iranian national heritage site

Coordinates: 32°30′N 51°48′E

- کاخ بهارستان
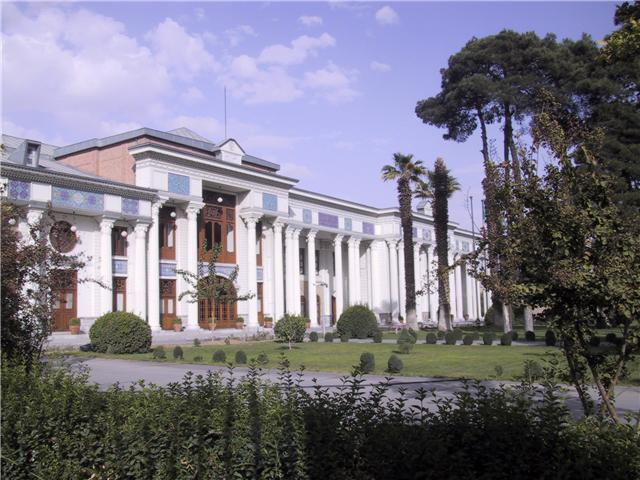
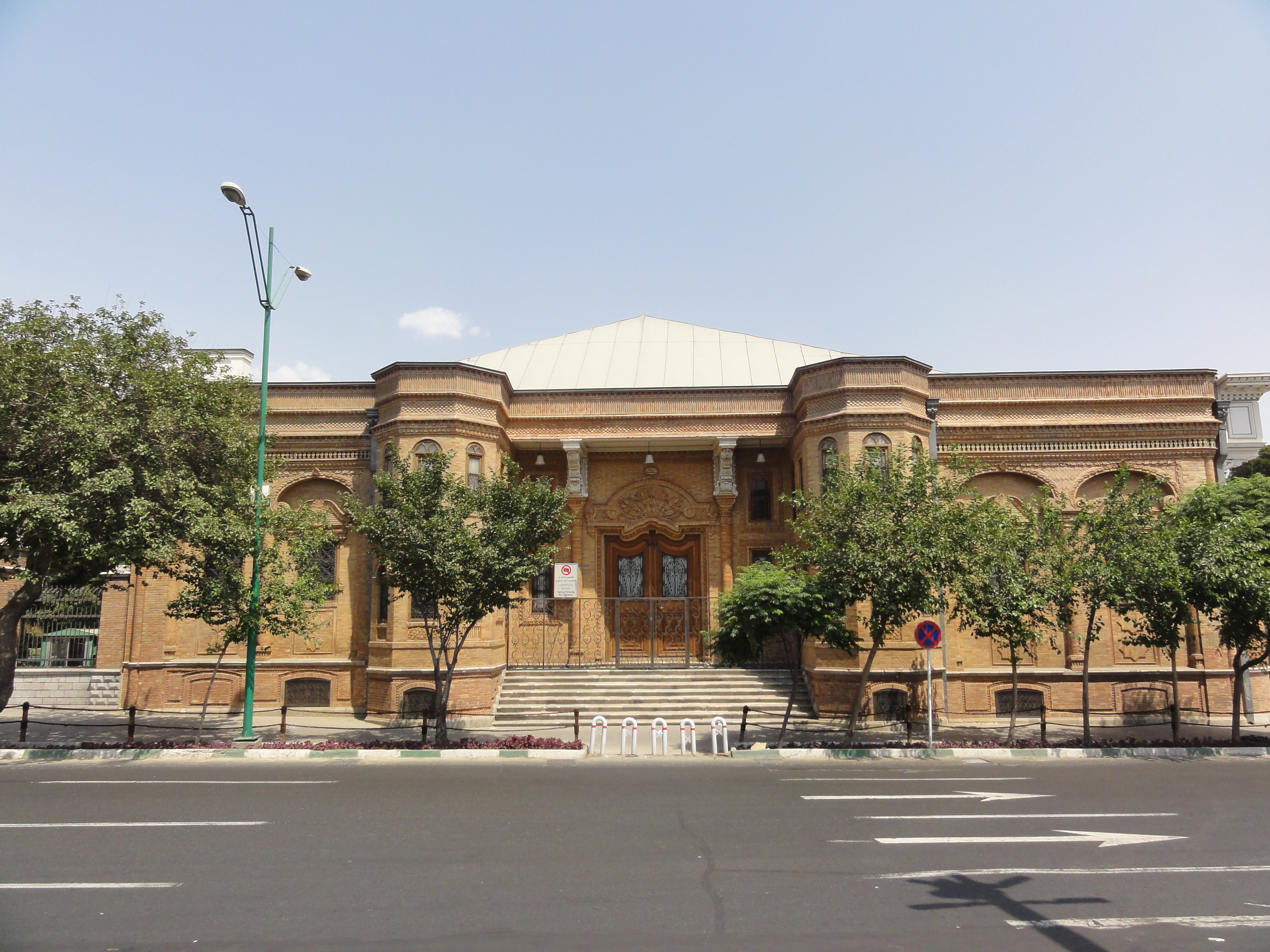
- Interactive map of the Baharestan Palace area

General information
- Location: Baharestan Square, Tehran, Iran
- Completed: 1878

Baharestan Palace (Persian: کاخ بهارستان) is the historic Iranian parliament building, inaugurated in 1906 (see the Persian Constitutional Revolution). The neighborhood where the palace is located was named after the complex.

== History ==
The palace was originally built by Mirza Hosein Khan Sepahsalar, a Qajar era prime minister, as his private residence. Afterwards, it was owned by Naser al-Din Shah Qajar. During the Persian Constitutional Revolution, it became the Iranian parliament building. It was bombarded in 1908 by the forces of Mohammad Ali Shah Qajar leading to the Minor Tyranny.

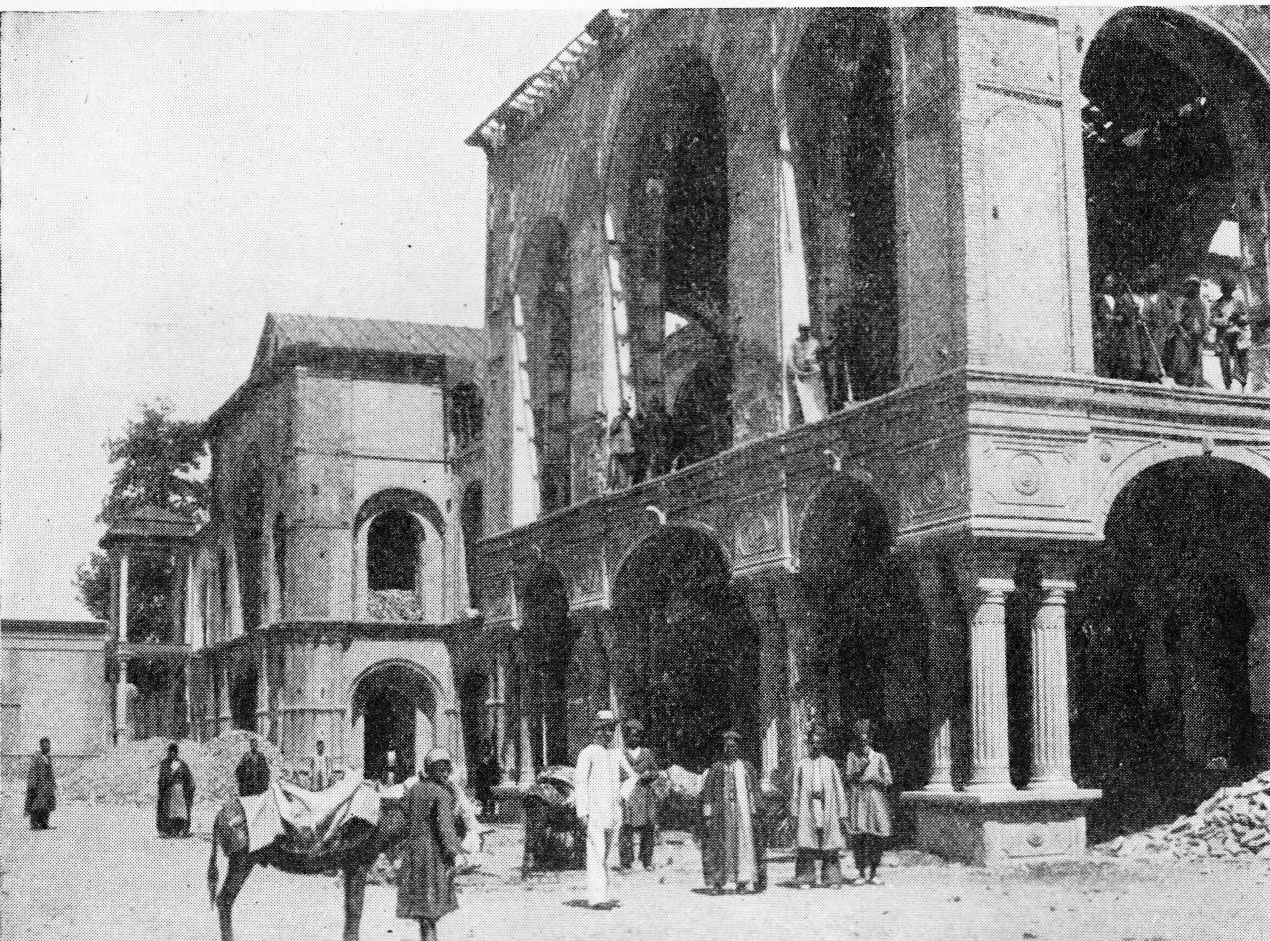
The parliament after the 1908 bombardment

Baharestan Palace remained the location for the lower house of the Iranian parliament (the Senate had moved to a new building in central Tehran) until the Iranian Revolution in 1979. After the revolution, the parliament became unicameral and met at the Senate building, and to a newly built building in Baharestan in 2004.

== Gallery ==
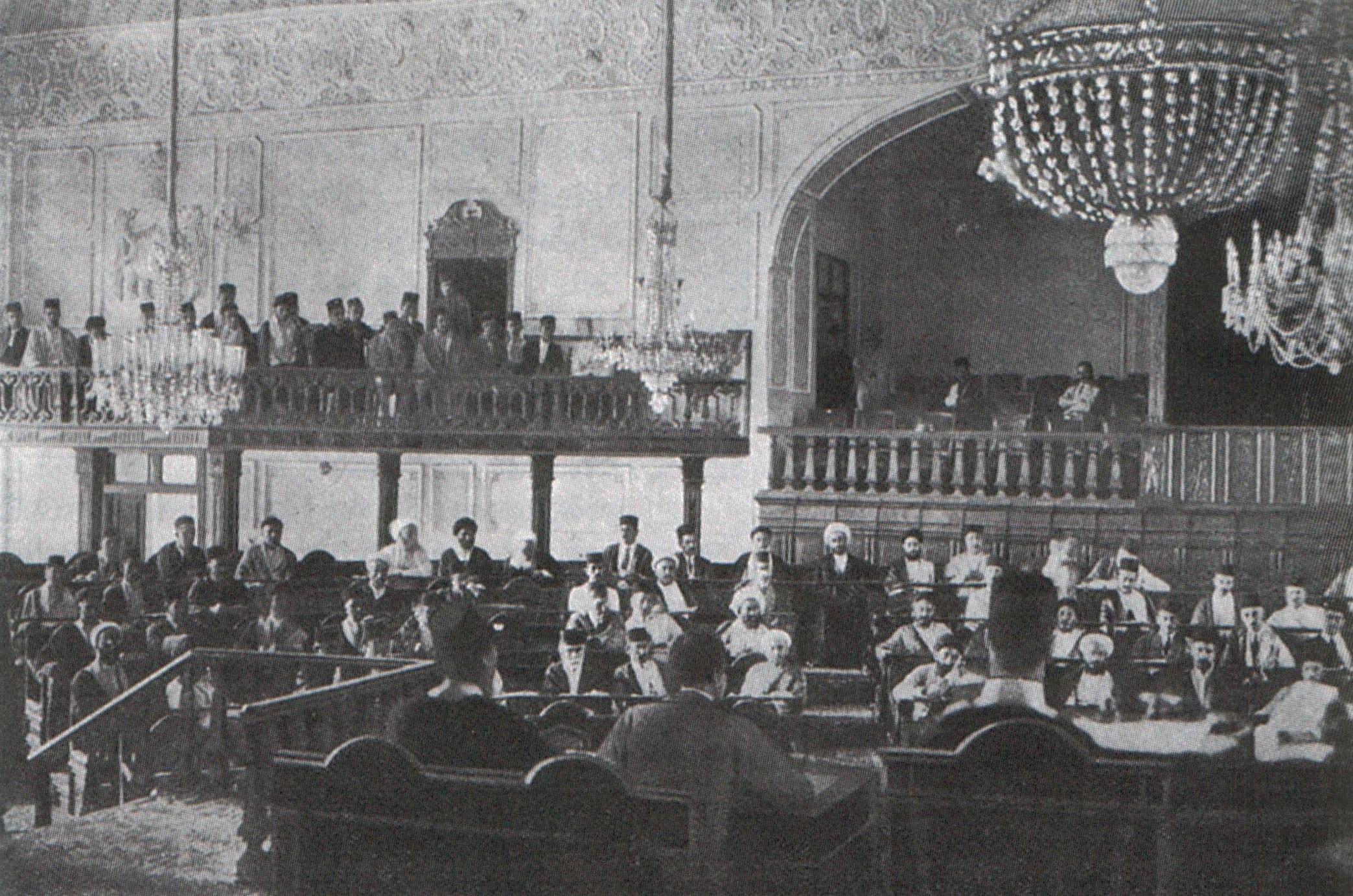
Parliament chamber, 1906

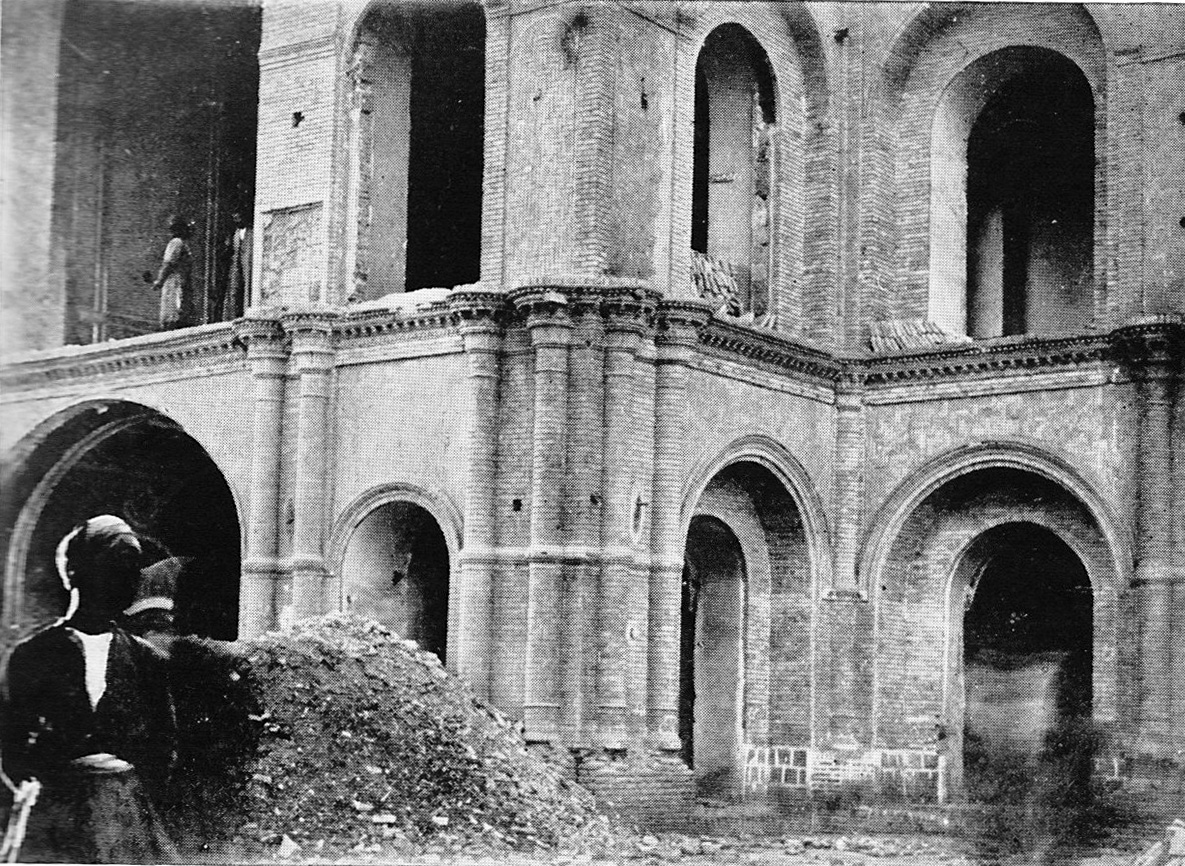
Baharestan Palace after bombardment, 1908

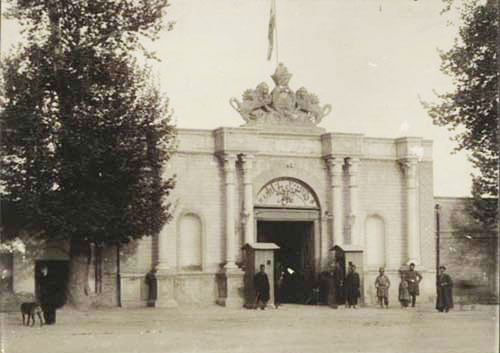
The old gate to the Baharestan gardens

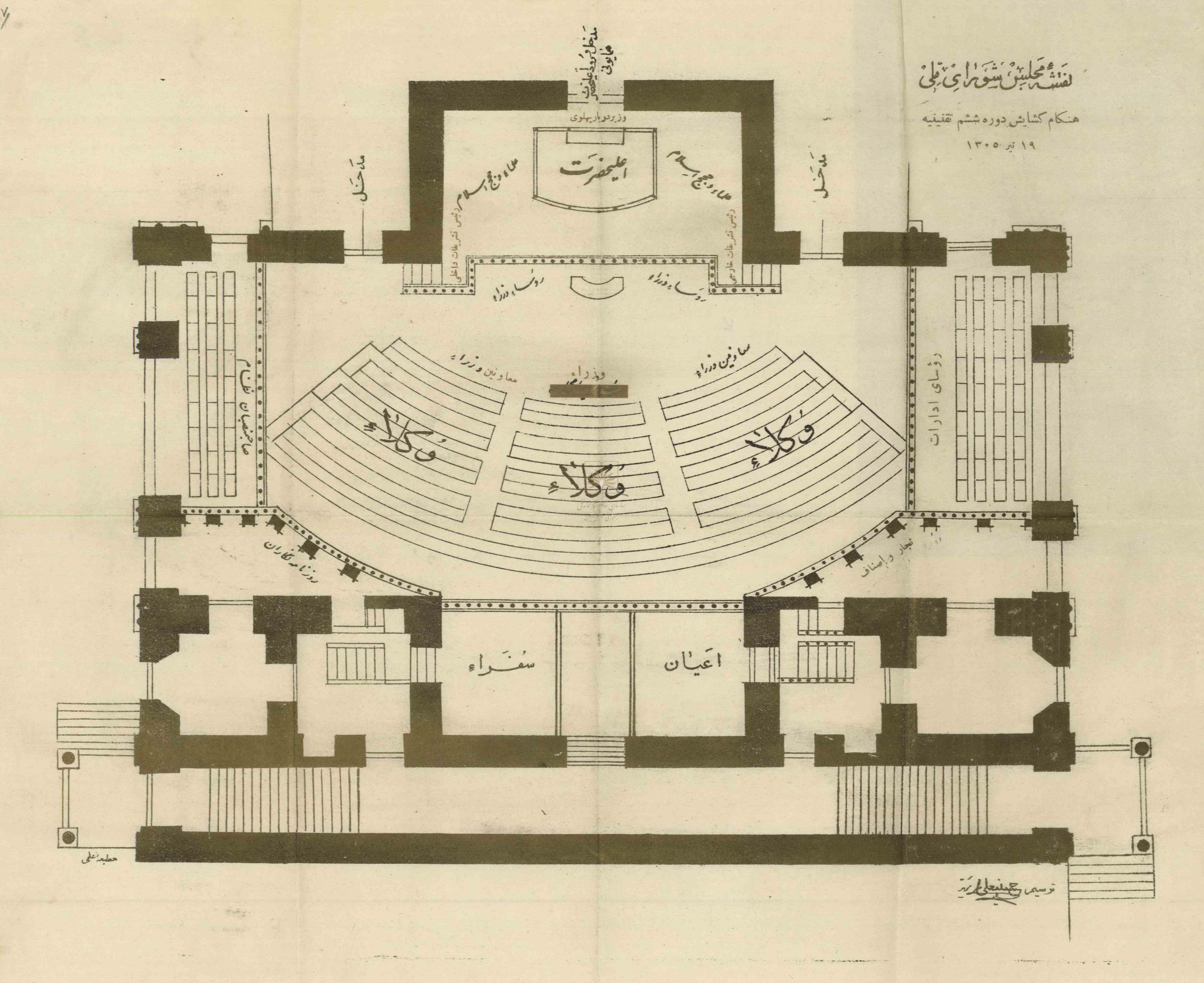
Plan drawing of the parliament chamber

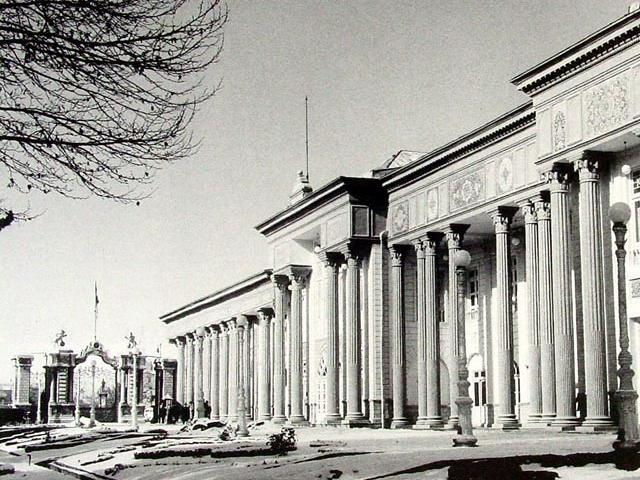
Baharestan Palace in 1956

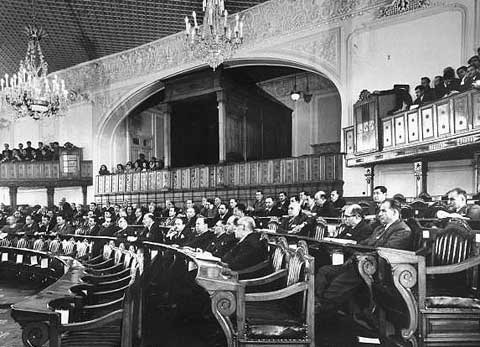
The parliament chamber, Pahlavi era

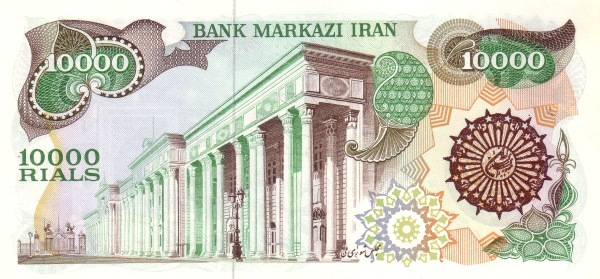
Baharestan Palace on a 1981 banknote

== See also ==
- Persian Constitutional Revolution
- 1908 bombardment of the Majlis
- 2017 Tehran attacks
