= Masjid-e-Hindan =

Gurdwara in Tehran, Iran

The Masjid-e-Hindan (Persian: مسجد هندان, lit. 'Mosque of the Indians') is a Sikh gurdwara in Tehran, Iran. The gurdwara was established in 1941 and serves Tehran's very small Sikh community. Despite its name, the complex is not an Islamic mosque, and is given its name due to the Muslim majority in Iran.
