= Baharestan (district) =

District in Tehran, Iran

Coordinates: 35°41′30″N 51°25′30″E

- District
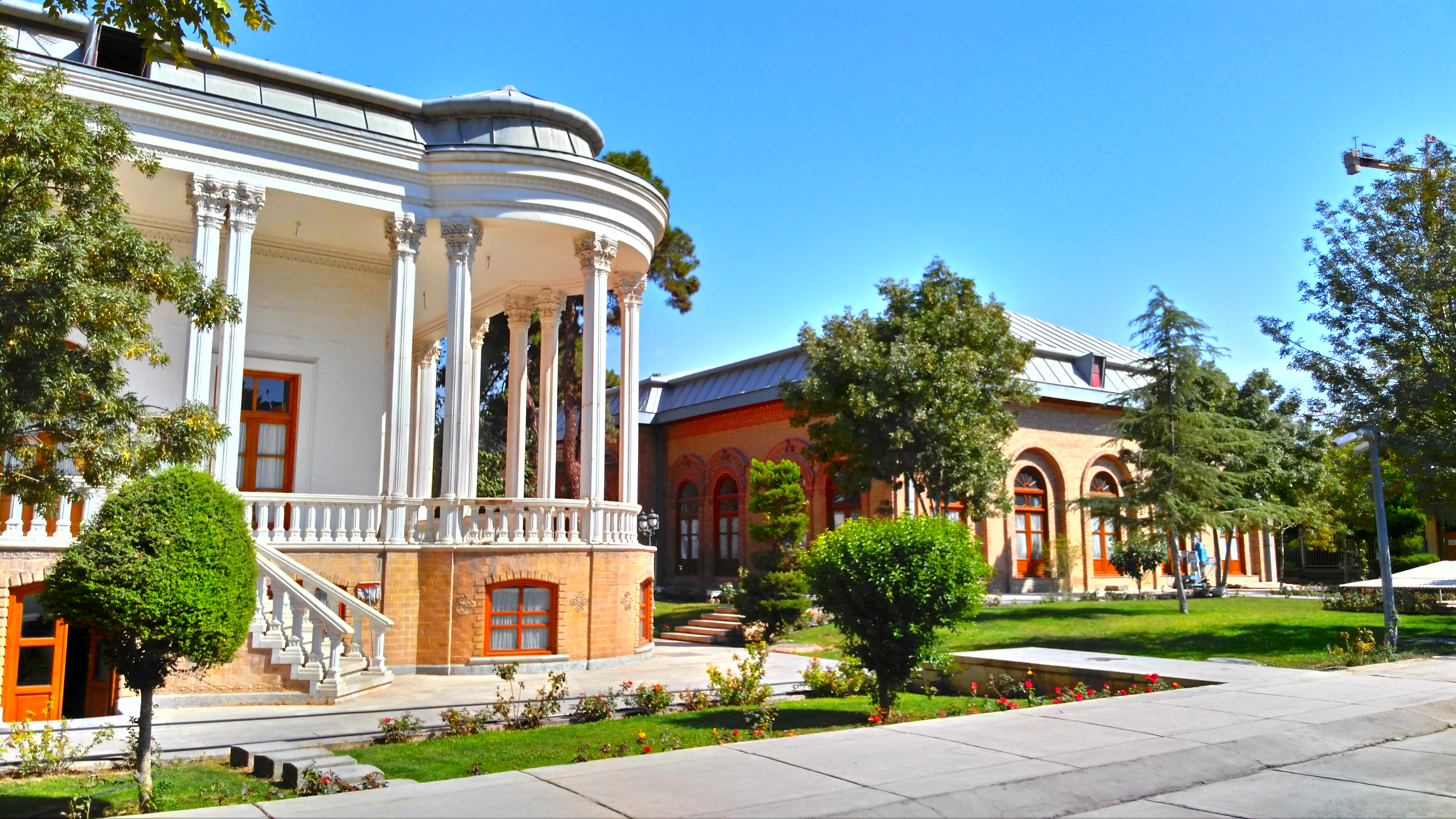
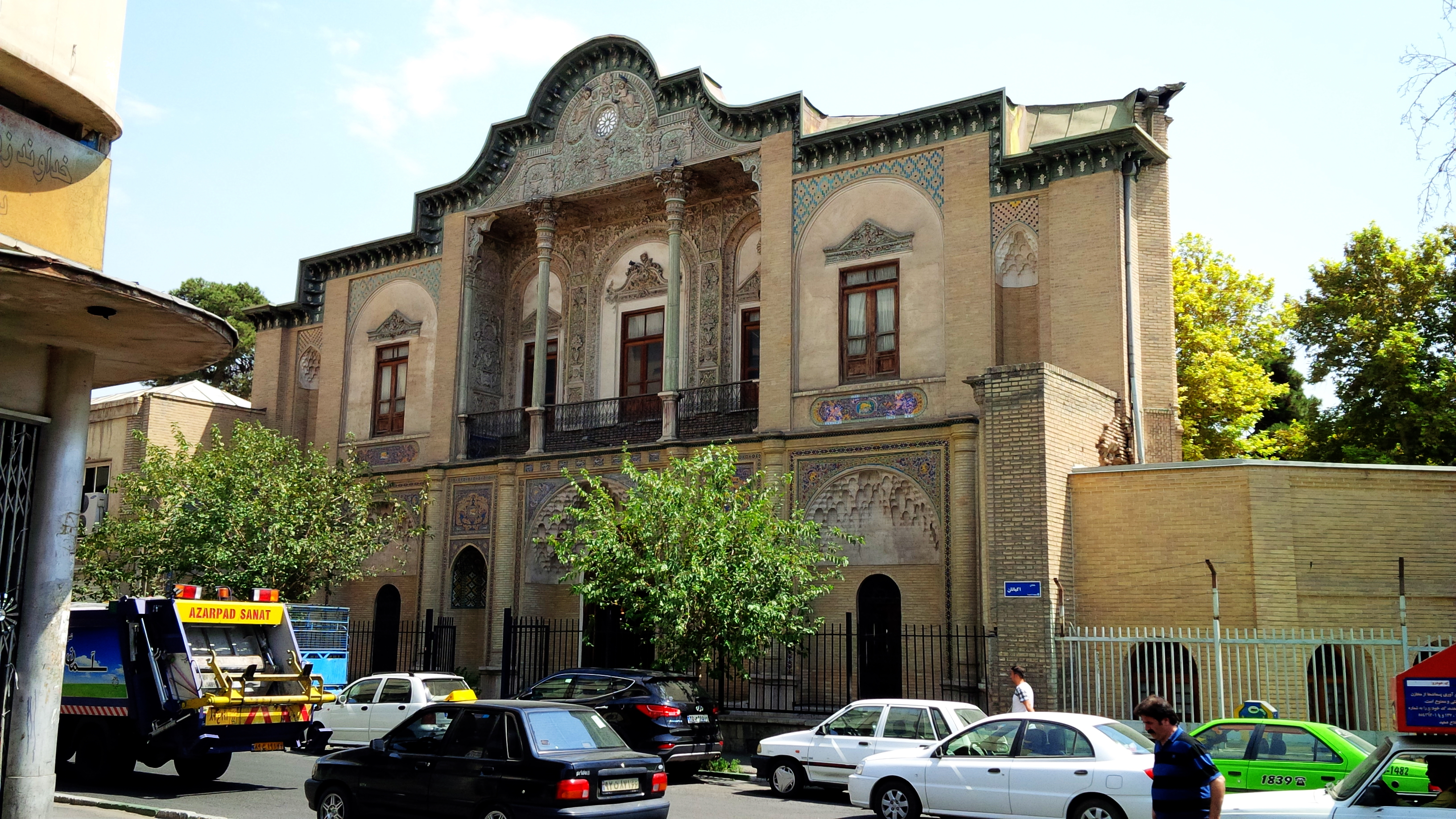
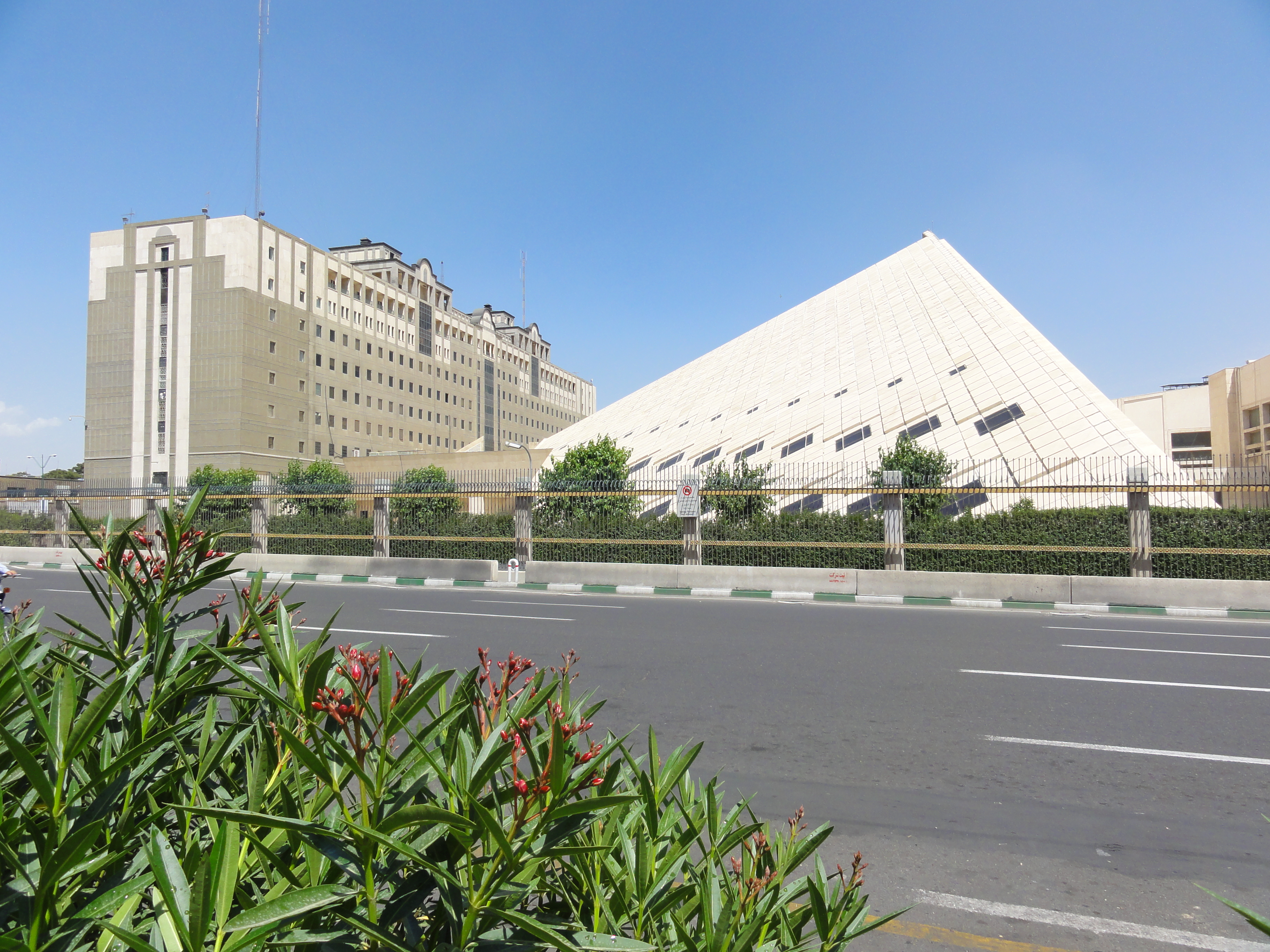
- Baharestan Palace Ekbatan Street Islamic Consultative Assembly

- Location within Iran
- Country: Iran

Baharestan (Persian: بهارستان) is a locality east of central Tehran, Iran. The historic Baharestan Palace, which housed the Iranian parliament from 1906 to 1979, is located in this neighborhood.

Kendriya Vidyalaya Tehran, the Embassy of India School, is in Baharestan.

== Gallery ==
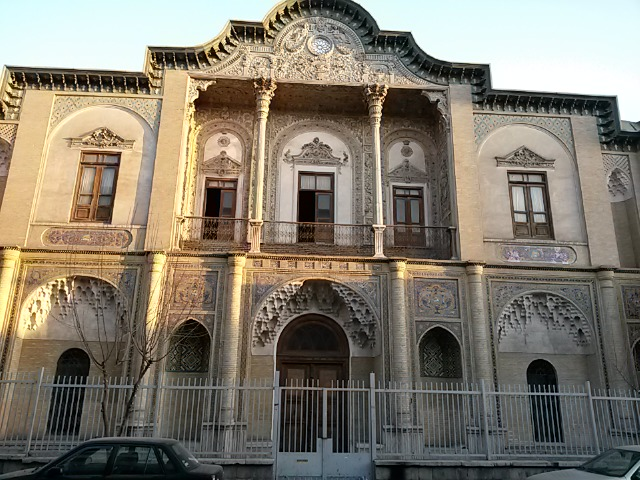
Historical building on Mellat street near Baharestan Square

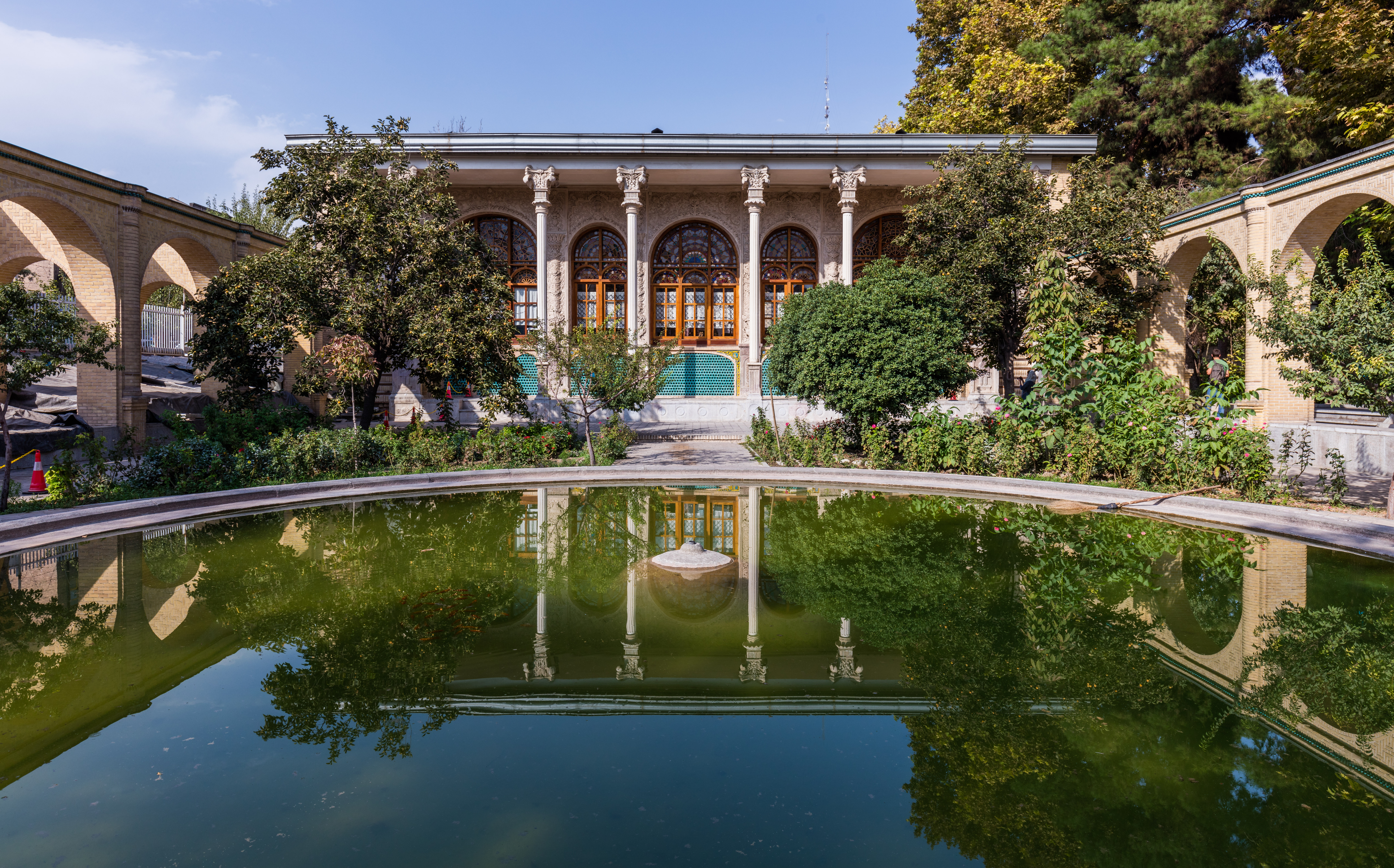
Masoudieh Mansion at Baharestan Square
