= Bandar Abbas Vishnu Temple =

Hindu temple in Iran

Vishnu Temple
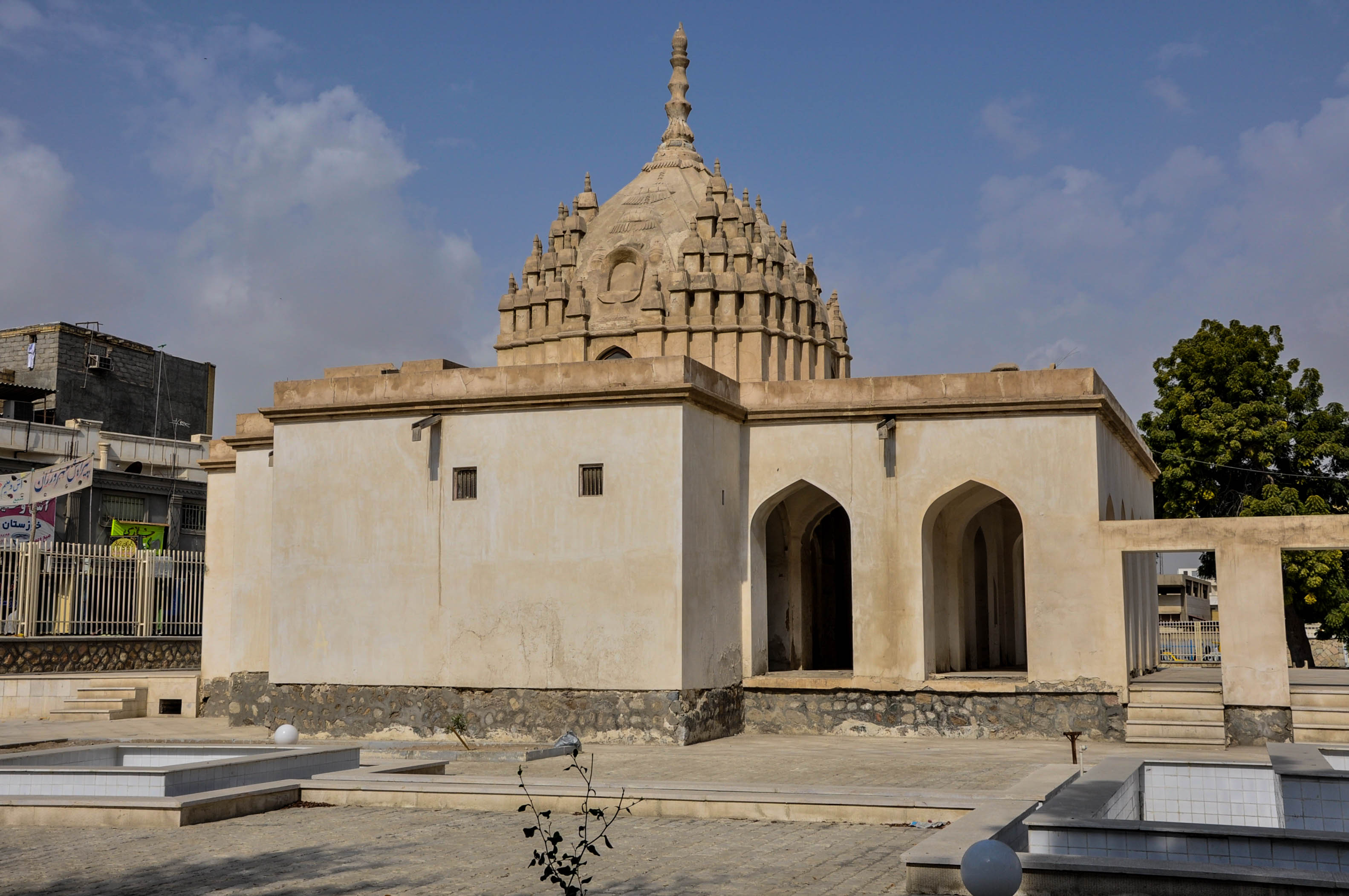
- A view of Temple

- Location in Iran

Religion
- Affiliation: Hinduism
- District: Bandar Abbas
- Deity: Vishnu

Location
- Country: Iran
- Interactive map of Vishnu Temple
- Coordinates: 27.1810756°N 56.2641°E

The Vishnu Temple in Bandar Abbas, Iran is a historical monument constructed in 1892 (1310 A.H.) during the reign of Mohammad Hassan Khan Sa'd-ol-Malek and dedicated to the Hindu god Vishnu.

The temple was built by the Indian community working for the British East India Company.

== Architecture ==
The temple has a central square room which is covered by a dome. The architecture of the dome is independent of Iranian prototypical architecture. The construction is done with coral stone, mortar, mud, and louis chalk. There are some rooms for students. The corridors and some rooms are painted with the image of Krishna.

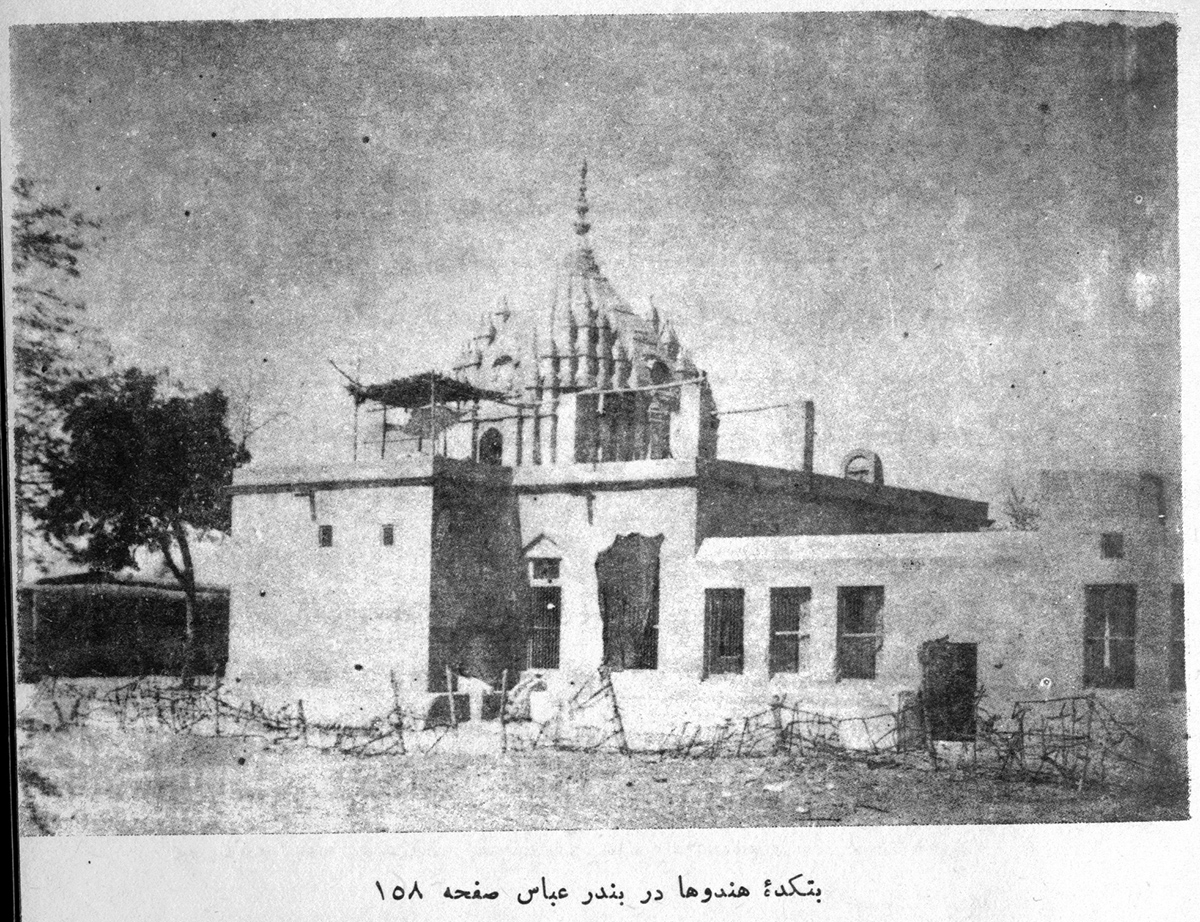

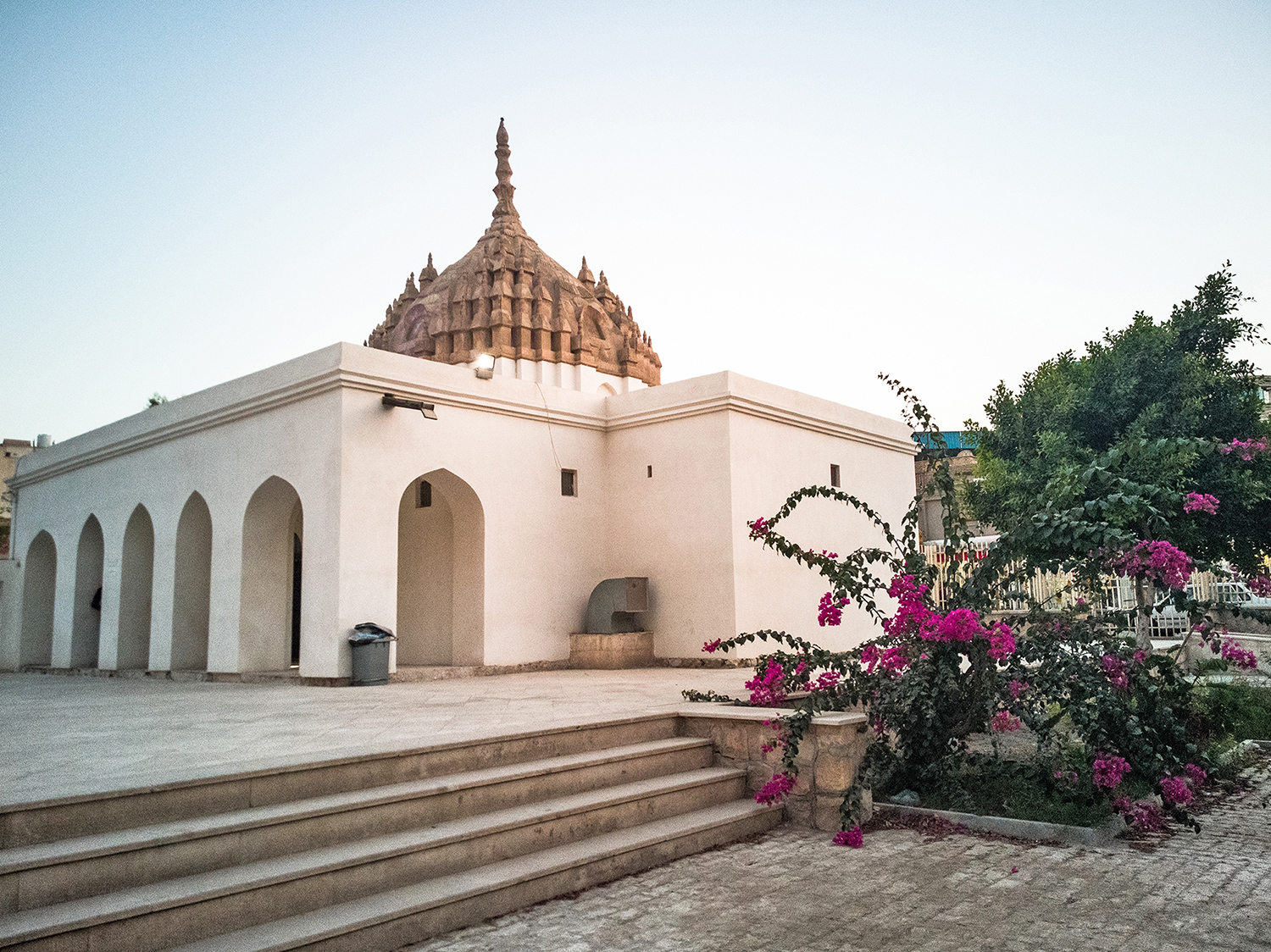

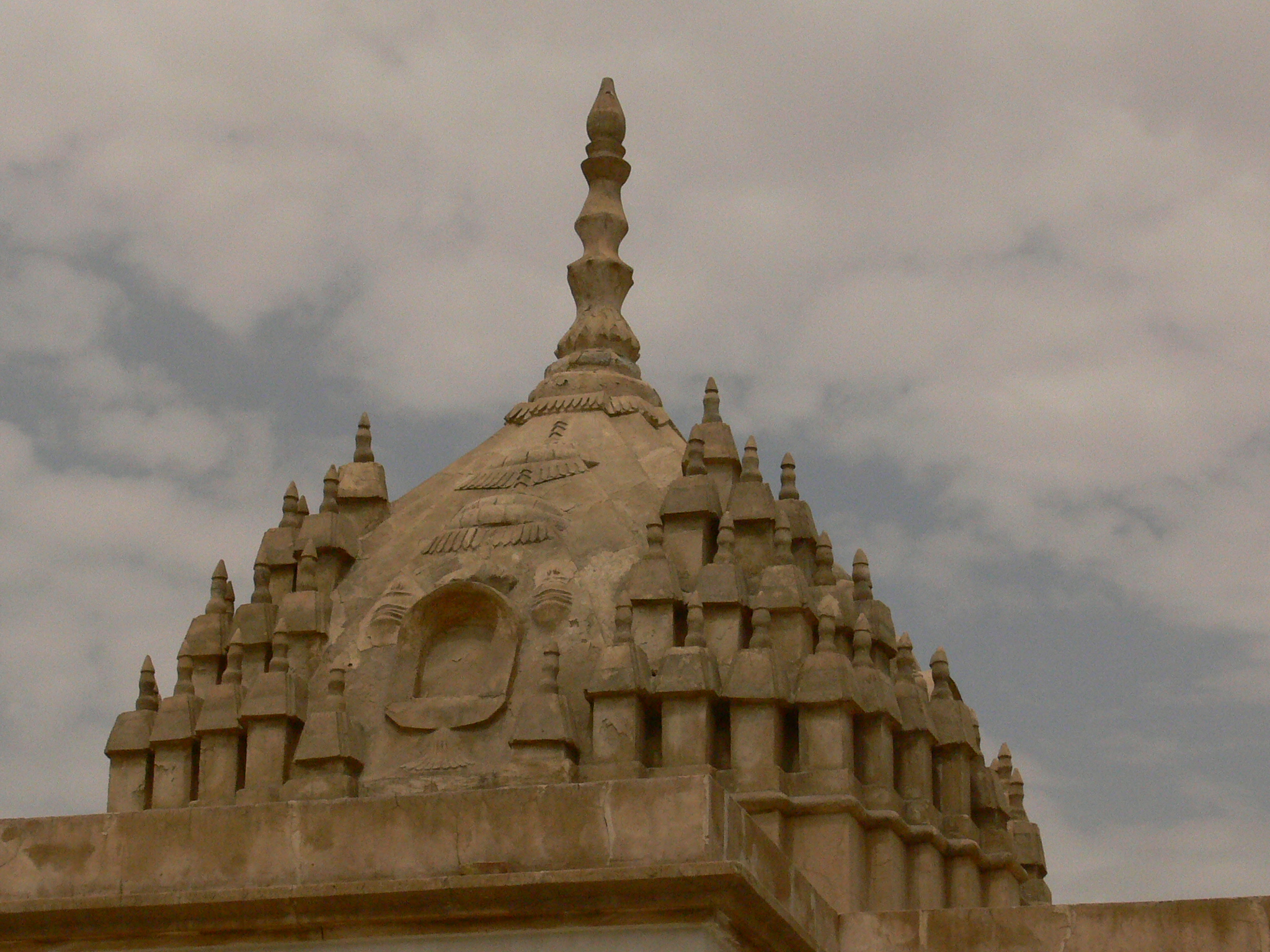

== See also ==
- Hinduism in Iran
