= Sikhism in Iran =

Sikhism in Iran سیک ھای ایران

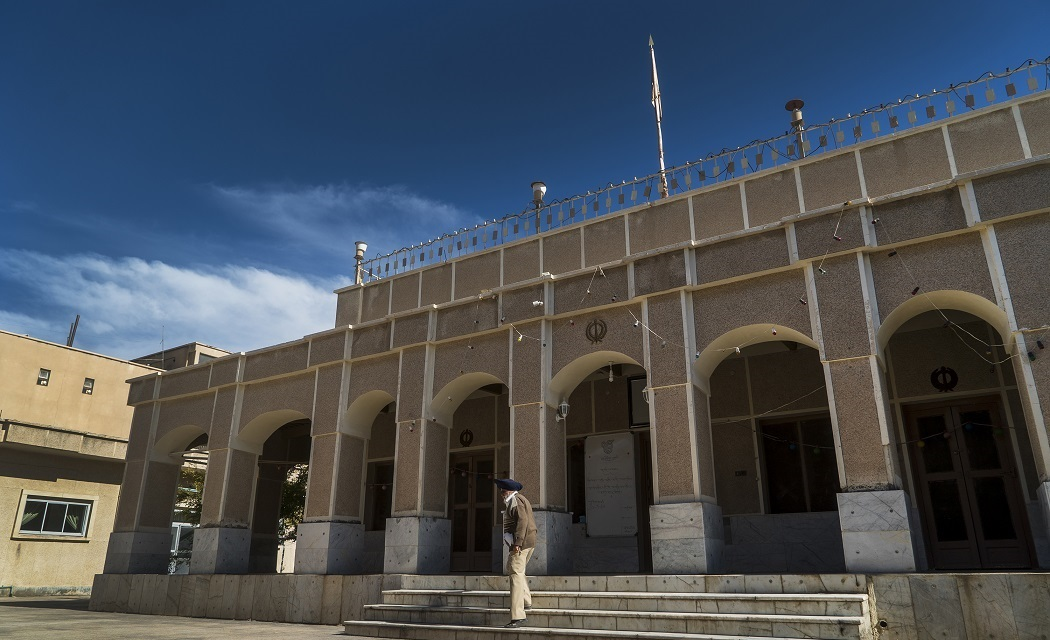
- Zahedan Gurdwara

Total population
- 60–100 families (2011 est.)

Regions with significant populations
- Bandar Abbas • Zahedan • Tehran

Languages
- Punjabi • Persian • Balochi

Iranian Sikhs form a very small minority in Iran, with a 2011 estimate for some 60 to 100 families to be residing in Iran. Members of the community speak Punjabi among themselves, and Persian and Balochi with the larger community. Most Sikhs living in Iran are Iranian citizens.

== History ==
The initial presence of Sikhs in Iran dates to the early 20th century, with Sikh business people as well as Sikh troops in the British military arriving during the World War I. The primary centre of Sikh immigration was initially the hamlet of Zahedan, near the border of then British Indian Empire (contemporary Pakistan) during the 1920s when the Trans-Iranian Railway project was started. According to a folk etymology, it is believed that when Reza Shah visited the city he saw Sikhs in white robes living there and thus changed the name from Dozdab (Land of thieves) to Zahedan (plural of the word zâhid (زاهد), meaning 'pious') after the Sikhs who were considered zâhid (sages) by him.

An Indian school was started in 1930s located in Zahedan serving Sikh families. It was shifted to Tehran in 1952 and became Kendriya Vidyalaya Tehran in 2004.

In 1979 there were around 250 Sikhs in Zahedan who own motor parts distributorships, construction firms and import-export companies. After the Iranian Revolution a number Sikhs left for India and Europe and remaining shifted to the capital city of Tehran.

In 2019 State Government of Punjab, India announced that a chair will be installed in the name of Guru Nanak in 11 universities, of which seven are in Punjab, three in other parts of India and one University of Religions and Denominations in Iran. The Chair will conduct research on life and teachings of Guru Nanak.

== Gallery ==
Detail of frescoes of two Akali-Nihang Sikhs ('dvarpala' or door guardians) at the entrance of a Mandir in Bandar Abbas in Iran, ca. 1892

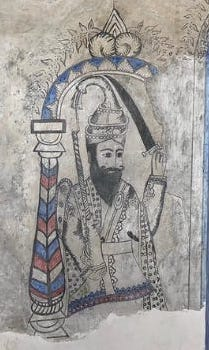

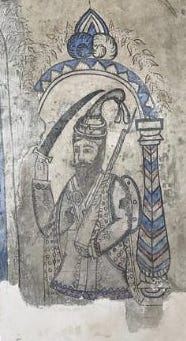
Zahedan Gurdwara

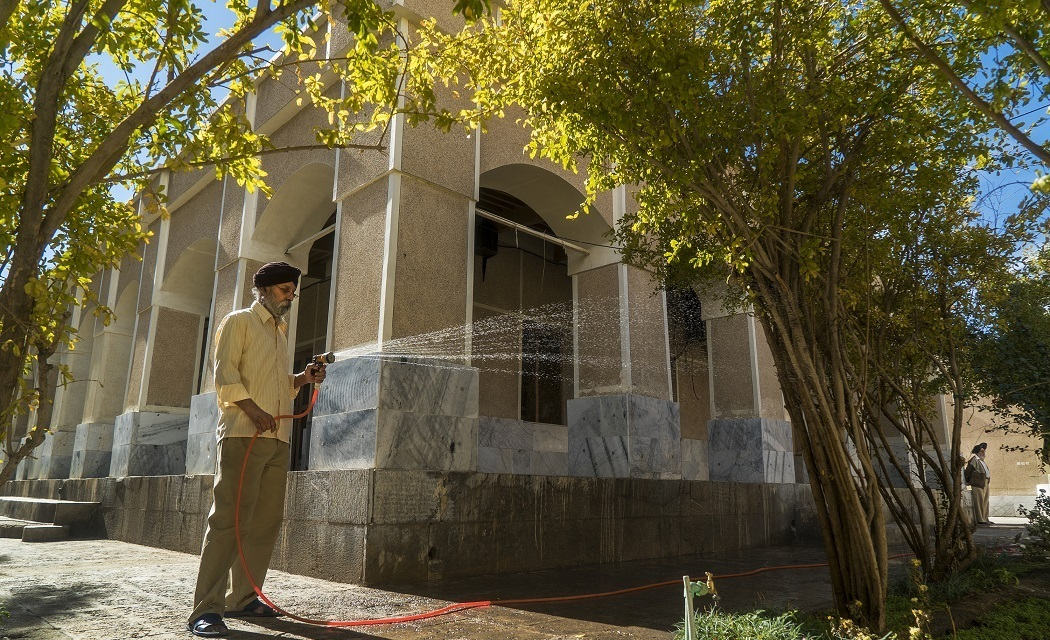

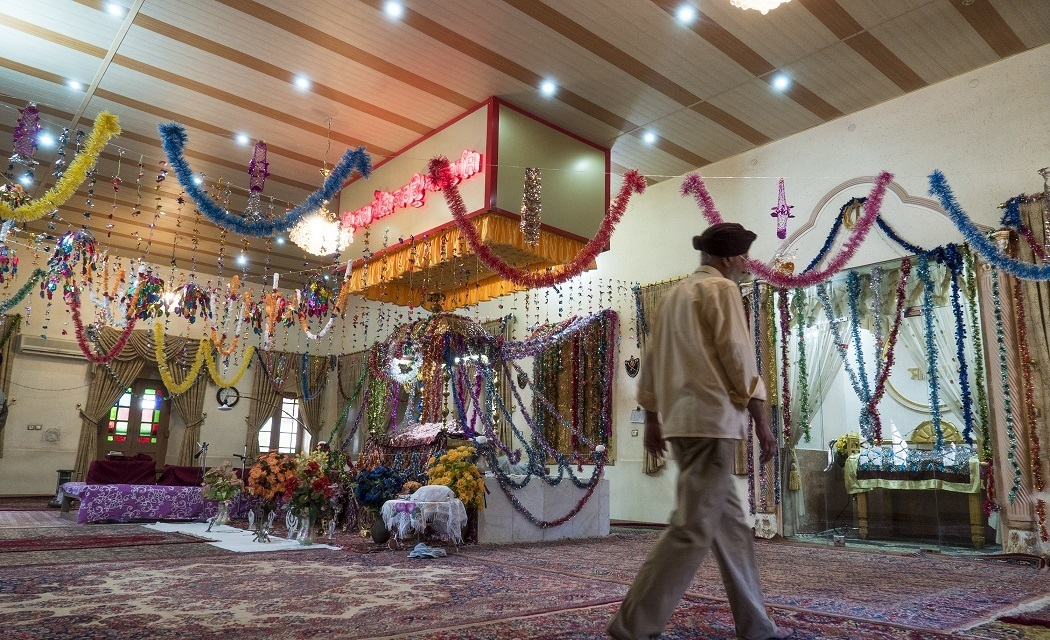

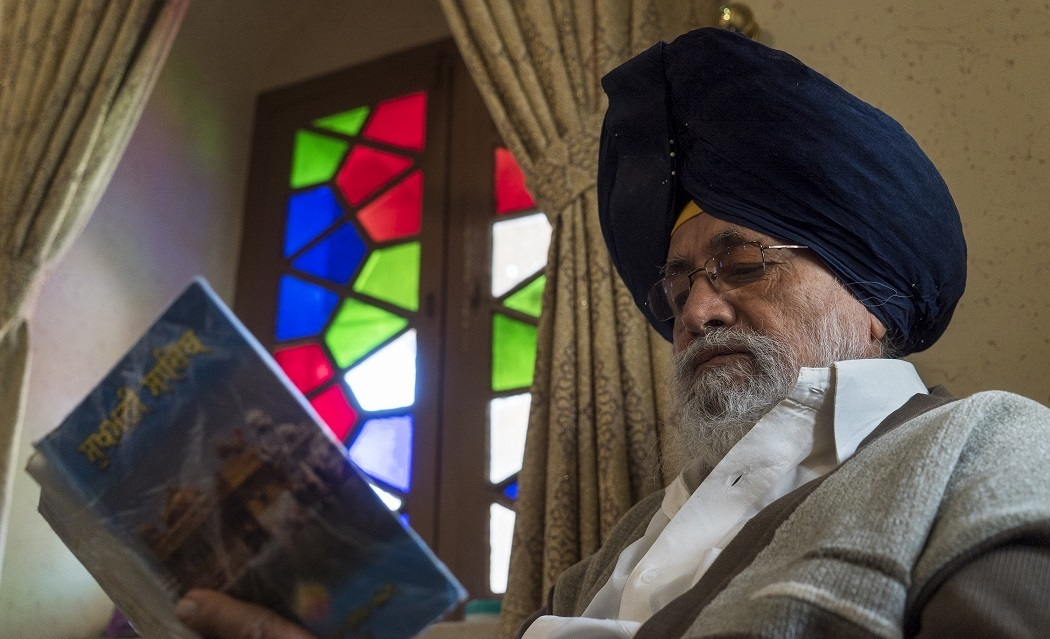

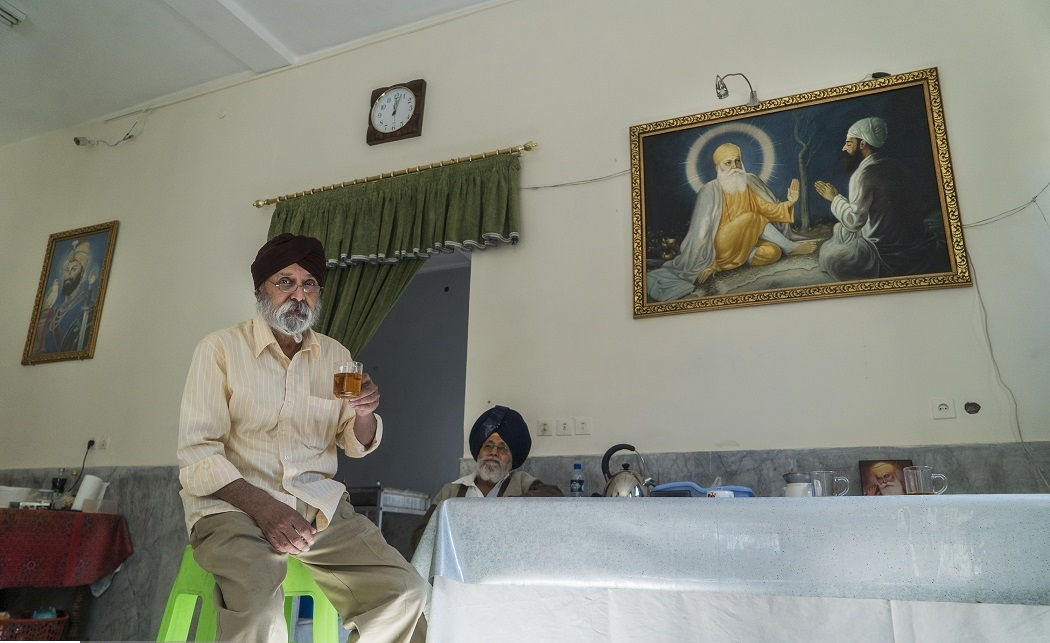

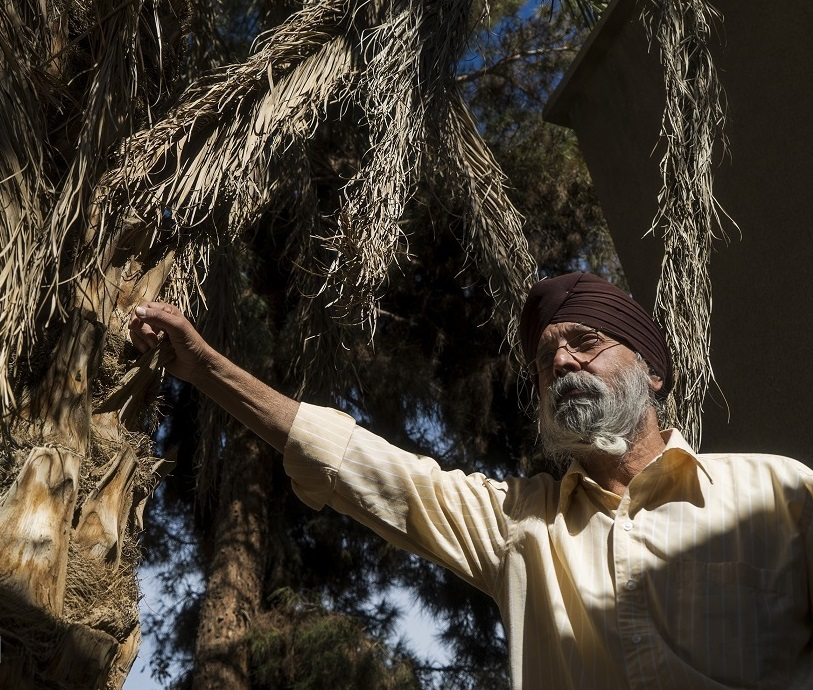

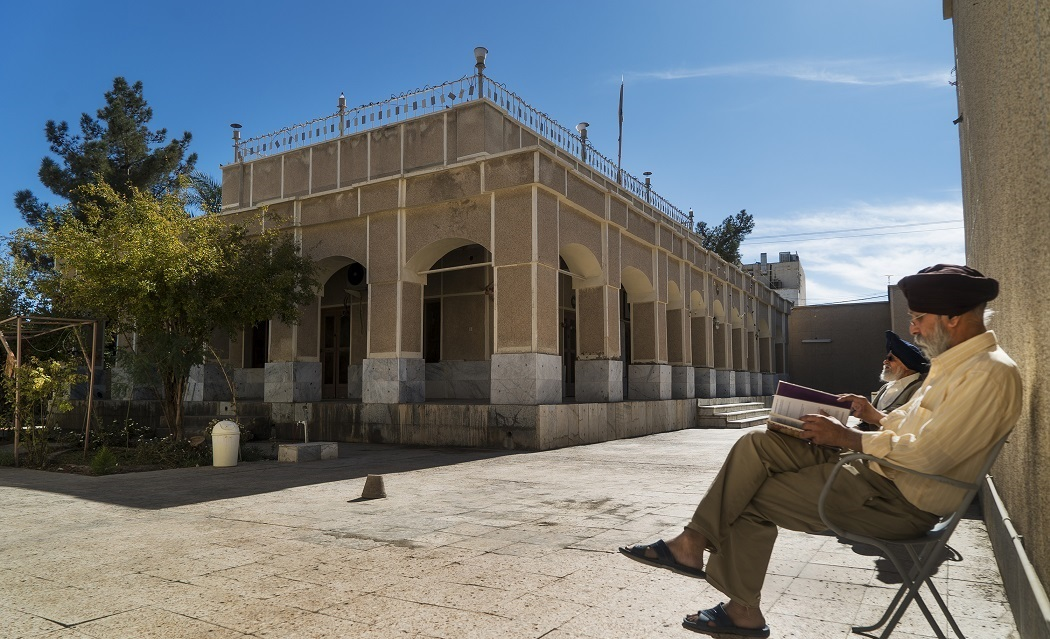

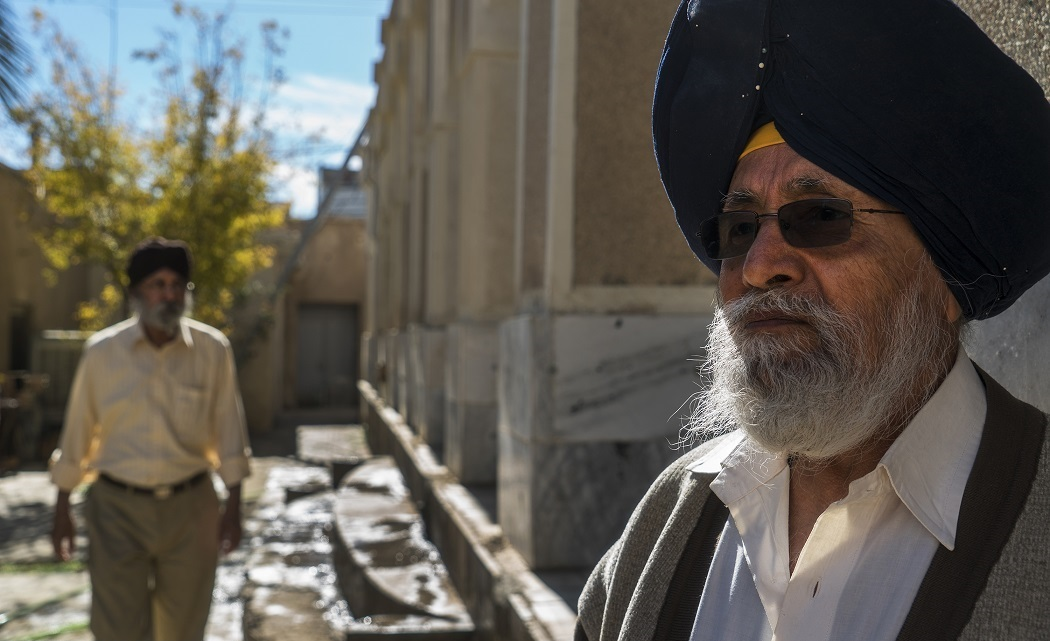

== See also ==
- Masjid-e-Hindan
- Buddhism in Iran
