= Kendriya Vidyalaya Tehran =

- केन्द्रीय विद्यालय संगठन مدرسه هندی تهران

Information
- Founded: 1952
- School board: Central Board of Secondary Education
- Age: 3 to 18
- Enrollment: 189 (2012)
- Language: English, Hindi
- Website: https://kendriyavidyalayatehran.ir/

Kendriya Vidyalaya Tehran ("Indian School in Tehran" Hindi: केन्द्रीय विद्यालय संगठन; Persian: مدرسه هندی تهران) is an Indian co-educational International school in the Baharestan District, Tehran, Iran. Affiliated with the Embassy of India, it serves grade levels LKG (3 years and up) through XII (18 years). The school, one of several Kendriya Vidyalaya institutions, has roughly 120 students ranging from three years old to 18. The school's primary taught languages are English, Hindi, Punjabi and French. Persian is taught in this school also.

== History ==
The school was founded in 1952.

It moved to its present location in central Tehran in 1952, as Indians had moved to that city. At some point its affiliation shifted to the Central Board of Secondary Education (CBSE). The after-effects of the Iranian Revolution of 1979 reduced the school's enrollment as only 60 to 65 Indian families remained in Iran. It became a Kendriya Vidyalaya in 2004.

In a four-year period from 2008 to 2012 it had three grants, which kept the school in operation during the Great Recession. The first was 81 lakh (8,100,000) rupees from the Ministry of External Affairs of India, the second was 2 crore (20,000,000) rupees from Meira Kumar, and the third grant was 2 lakh (2,00,000) rupees sent on August 29, 2012.

== Student body ==
In 2012 the school had 189 students, with 138 being Indians and the remainder from other nationalities including Afghani, Chinese, Thai, Pakistani and Iranian.

== Members List ==
There are 23 Staff Members in school.

== See also ==
- India–Iran relations
