= Buddhism in Iran =

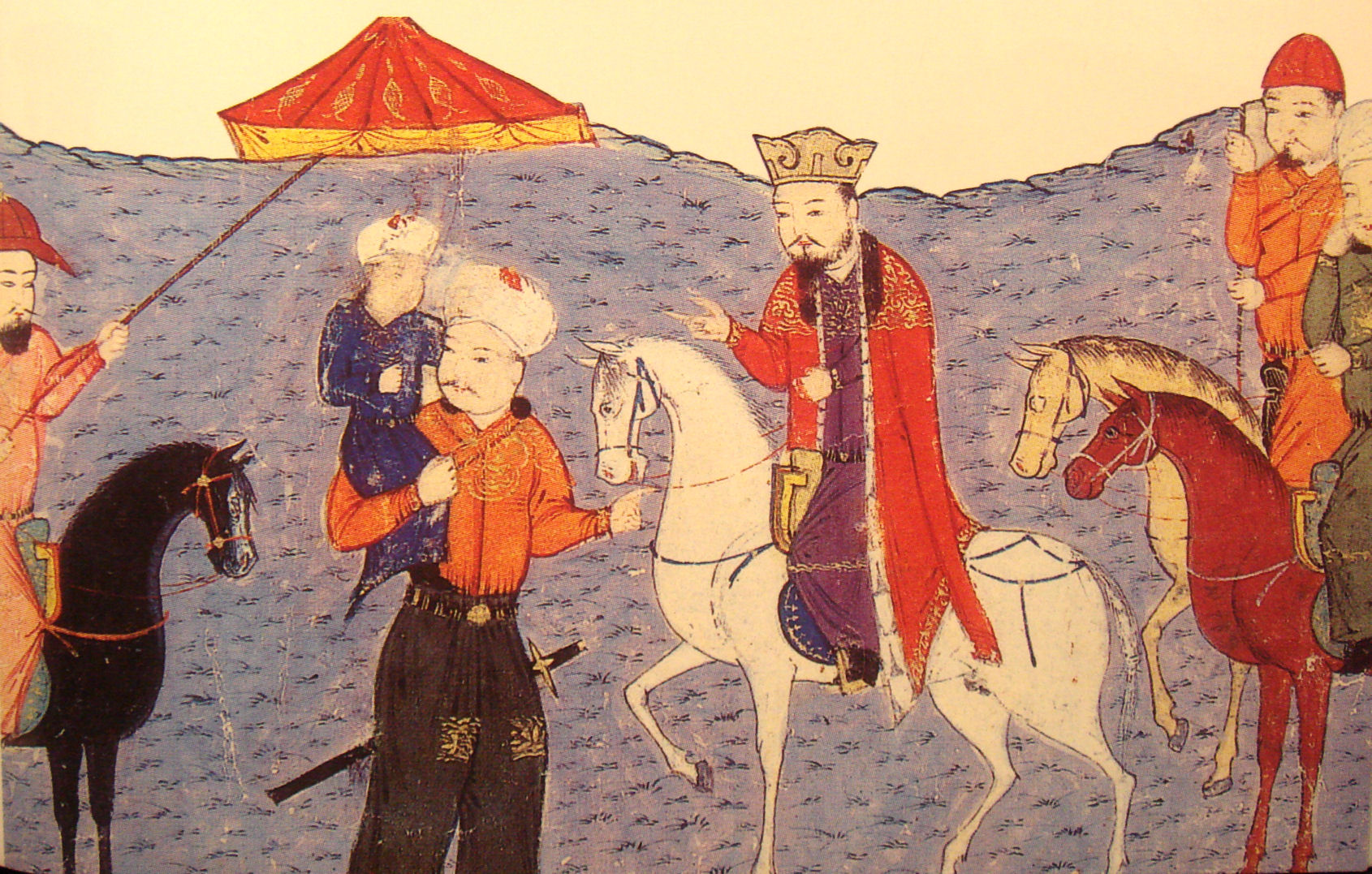
Mongol rulers Arghun and Abaqa were Buddhists. From the 14th century Universal History by Rashid-al-Din Hamadani.

Buddhism in Iran dates back to the 2nd century, when Parthian Buddhist missionaries, such as An Shigao and An Xuan, were active in spreading Buddhism in China. Many of the earliest translators of Buddhist literature into Chinese were from Parthia and other kingdoms linked with present-day Iran.

== History ==
=== Pre-Islamic Iran ===
Buddhists were persecuted during the Sasanid rule in the vast territory they ruled, as they made Zoroastrianism the state religion in 224 AD, and thereafter burned many Buddhist sites in the regions where it was practiced, namely Central Asia. Surviving Buddhist sites in the easternmost Sassanian territories, comprising modern day Central Asia, were later raided in the 5th century by the White Huns.

=== Arab conquests and decline ===
"In the centuries before the Arab conquests Buddhism was spread throughout the eastern Iranian world. Buddhist sites have been found in Afghanistan, Turkmenistan, Uzbekistan, and Tajikistan, as well as within Iran itself." The Arab conquests brought the final demise of Buddhism in Eastern Iran and Afghanistan, although in some sites like Bamiyan and Hadda it survived until the 8th or 9th century.

=== Ilkhanate ===
Ilkhanate under Hulagu Khan embraced Kagyu school of Tibetan Buddhism while tolerant to religious diversity, which enabled Buddhism to remain the official religion of the empire till 1295. During this period, Buddhist temples were constructed throughout the kingdom. Additionally, small Buddhist communities settled throughout the Ilkhanate realm, mainly originating from Kashmir and East Turkestan. Later, Ilkhanate ruler Ghazan, who was raised as Nestorian Christian and received Buddhist education in his youth, converted to Islam in 1295 AD and made it the state religion of the Ilkhanate. He also prohibited the practice of Buddhism, but allowed monks to go into exile into neighboring Buddhist regions.

=== Contemporary ===
In 2002, 19 Gandharan style Buddhist statues were unearthed in the southern Iranian province of Fars.

In recent years, as part of the post-revolution period, Buddhist ideas and practice, as part of a broader reemergence of various faiths in Iran, has experienced an upsurge of interest among Iranians. Some of the poetry of Sohrab Sepehri shows Buddhist influence.

== See also ==
- An Shigao
- An Xuan
- Buddhism in Central Asia
- Buddhism in Afghanistan
- Hinduism in Iran
- Sikhism in Iran
- Ugraparipṛcchā Sūtra
- Buddhism in pre-Islamic Arabia
