= Zoroastrian literature =

Texts related to the Iranian religion

Zoroastrian literature is the corpus of literary texts produced within the religious tradition of Zoroastrianism. These texts span the languages of Avestan, named after the famous Zoroastrian work known as the Avesta, and Middle Persian (Pahlavi), which includes a range of Middle Persian literature.

== Avesta ==
The Avesta is the oldest extant primary source of Zoroastrian literature, although the term "Avesta" designates not one text but a group of texts written in the Old Iranian language called Avestan, attested from the 2nd to 1st millennia BC. The types of manuscripts preserve Avestan texts, the oldest of which dates to the 13th century AD: those liturgical manuscripts which combine passages from various Avestan texts alongside ritual instructions in various languages such as Pahlavi, and those which simply present the text alongside a Pahlavi translation/commentary, an example of the latter being the Zend. The former category can be further subdivided into long and short liturgies.

=== Liturgical manuscripts ===
The following list of manuscripts is taken from Andrés-Toledo 2015.

==== Long liturgies ====
- Yasna
- Yasna ī Rapiθwin
- Vīsprad
- Vīdēvdād
- Vīštāsp Sast

===== Short liturgies =====
- Khordeh Avesta
  - Niyāyišn
  - Gāh
  - Āfrīnagān
  - Sih-rozag
- Yašts (a group of 21 hymns, such as the Ohrmazd Yasht)

=== Manuscripts accompanied by translations ===
- Āfrīn ī Zardušt
- Aogəmadaecā
- Frahang ī ōīm
- Hadoxt nask
- Herbedestan
- Nerangestan
- Nerang ī āta(x)š
- Pursišnīhā
- Vaēθā Nask

=== Sasanian Avesta ===
The Sasanian Avesta was the collection of Zoroastrian writing collected during the Sasanian period. It is now mostly lost but its content can be reconstructed from references made in later Zoroastrian literature. The Sasanian Avesta was organized into 21 nasks, i.e., volumes, which were grouped into 3 divisions; the Gāhānīg (Gathic) nasks, Hada Mānsrīg (manthras connected with the ritual) nasks, and Dādīg (legal) nasks.

==== Gahanig nasks ====
- Stōd-yasn
- Sudgar nask
- Warshtmansr nask
- Bag nask
- Waštag nask
- Hadoxt nask
- Spand nask

==== Hada Mānsrīg nasks ====
- Dāmdād nask
- Nāxtar nask
- Pāzag nask
- Raθβištāiti nask
- Bariš nask
- Kaškaysraw nask
- Wištāsp-sāst nask

==== Hada Dad nasks ====
- Nikātum nask
- Duzd-sar-nizad nask
- Huspāram nask
- Sakātum nask
- Juddēwdād nask
- Čihrdād nask
- Bagān Yašt

== Middle Persian ==
Most Sassanid (224–651 AD) and post-Sassanid Zoroastrian literature was composed in Middle Persian. These texts span four alphabets: Inscriptional Middle Persian, Book Pahlavi, Avestan (Pāzand texts), and New Persian. Literary activity in Zoroastrian Middle Persian can be divided into three phases: a Sasanian Middle Persian (3rd to 7th centuries AD), Classical Middle Persian (8th to 10th centuries), and Late Middle Persian and Neo-Pahlavi (11th to 19th centuries).

The following list of texts is taken from Andrés-Toledo 2015.

=== Sasanian Middle Persian ===
- Various inscriptions (especially of the 3rd-century priest Kartir) and Pahlavi translations and commentaries of Avestan texts

=== Classical Middle Persian ===
- Book of Arda Viraf
- Jamasp Namag
- Čīdag Andarz ī Pōryōtkēšān
- Čim ī Kustīg
- Dadestan-i Denig
- Dādestān ī Mēnōg ī Xrad
- Denkard
- Bundahishn
- Mādayān ī Gizistag Abāliš
- Nāmagīhā ī Manuščihr
- Pahlavi Rivāyat
- Rivāyat of Ādurfarrbag ī Farroxzādān
- Rivāyat of Ēmēdī Ašwahištān
- Šayest-nē-šāyest
- Škand-gumānīg Wizār
- Wizidagiha-i Zadspram
- Zand ī Wahman Yasn

=== Late Middle Persian ===
- Colophons
- Nērangs

=== Neo-Pahlavi ===
- Late redactions and recompositions of earlier texts
- Wizirgerd ī Dēnīg

== New Persian ==
New Persian was adopted relatively late for one or more of several possible reasons, including religious and/or conservative attachment to the use of the earlier Pahlavi, a desire to maintain distance from languages primarily or newly expressed in the Islamic world, and potential distance from the main locales where New Persian was being used. The earliest Zoroastrian work in this language come from the 13th century, after the Mongol conquest of Iran.

The first surviving text of this nature is the Zarātoštnāma ("Book of Zarathustra"), also known as the Mawlūd-e Zartošt ("Birth of Zarathustra"), written by Kaykāvūs ibn Kaykhosrow, although later attributed to the poet Zartošt b. Bahrām Paždū, himself the author of numerous works including the Čangranaghāčanāma. Later, the works of Zartošt ibn Bahrām Paždū would be also be written in this language. As the primary Zoroastrian language (though largely confined to the religious elite) for over seven centuries, a sizable corpus of Zoroastrian texts came to be composed in this language. An example of a late hagiography is the Māhyārnāma ("Book of Māhyār"). There is a genre of texts known as the Ṣaddar or 'One Hundred Gates/Subjects', four extant works exist and each engages in a discourse covering one hundred subjects related to Zoroastrianism. The oldest are the Ṣaddar Nas̱r (which deals with sin and religious ritual) and the Ṣaddar Bondaheš (which deals with eschatology, cosmography, and ritual). Later, the Ṣaddar Naẓm (written in 1495 by Mardšāh ibn Malekšāh) expanded on the Ṣaddar Nas̱r but also diverges by substituting topics related to two festivals. In 1700, it was translated by Thomas Hyde, making it among the earliest Zoroastrian texts known to Western scholars. Texts were also written into other genres including religious miscellanies, Persian revāyats, scientific and astrological texts, Zoroastrian-Muslim apologetic texts, stories of migrations to India, didactic and ethical works, devotional works, the Azarkeivanian sect such as the Dasatir-i-Asmani, and additional works from the 18th century forwards especially in light of the introduction of printing to the regions where Zoroastrianism was present.

== Gujarati ==
Evidence of literary activity among Zoroastrians in India, in the Gujarati language, dates back to the 14th century at the earliest, although vernacular Zoroastrian texts in this language only begin to appear in the 17th and 18th centuries. The Persian centers of Zoroastrian literati had a profound impact on the Gujarati tradition of Zoroastrian writing. In the 19th century, the Parsis (Zoroastrian community of the Indian subcontinent) began to use Gujarati as their primary language of writing; the Parsis adopted the use of printing early on and so quickly came to begin publishing books, pamphlets, newspapers, and journals. The most important work for understanding the Parsi community is the Pārsi Prakāś ("Parsi Luster").

== See more ==
- Pazend
- Zoroastrian cosmology
