= Avesta =

Zoroastrian compendium of sacred literature

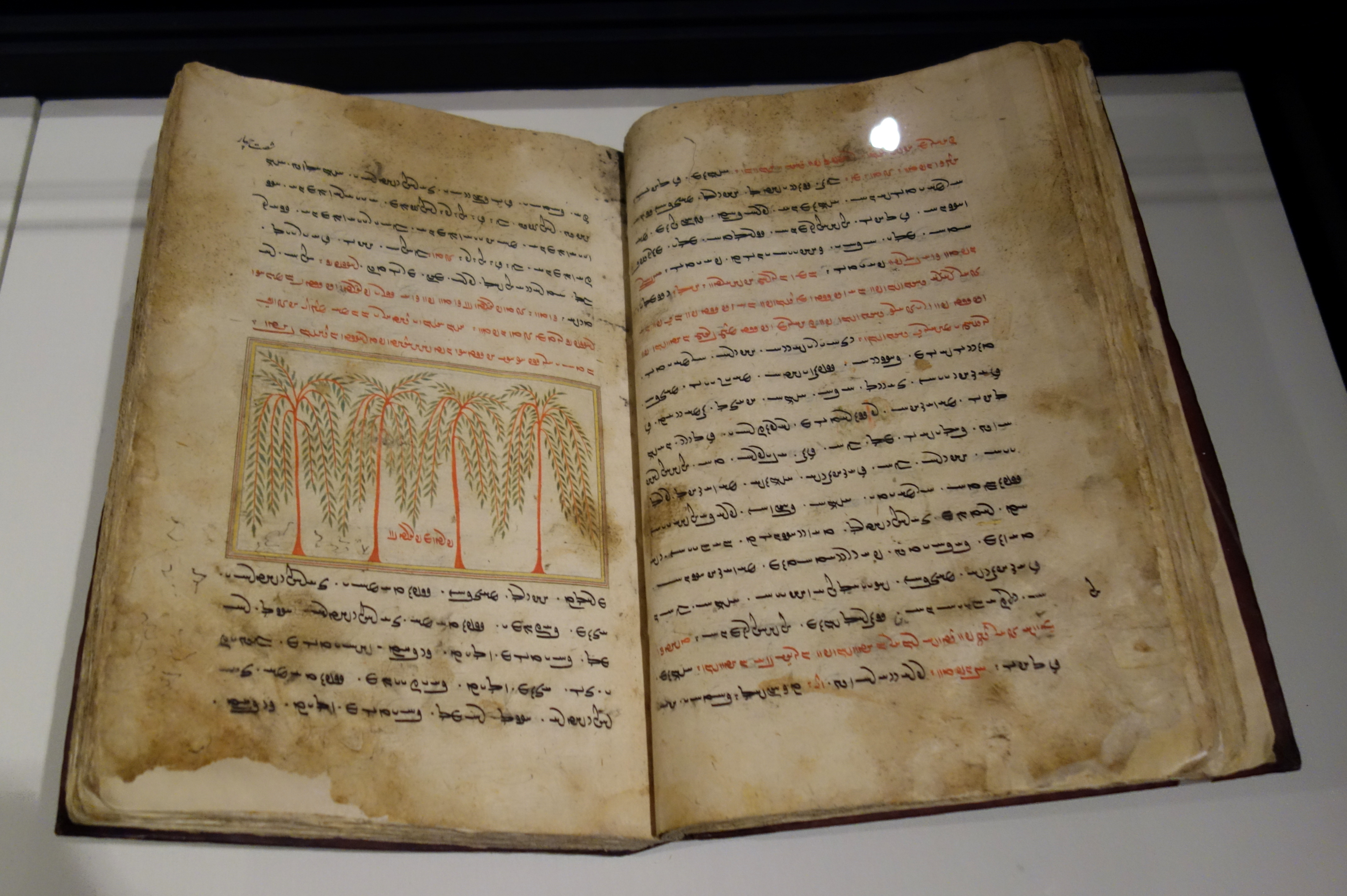
- Illuminated Iranian Vendidad Sade manuscript (MS 4060/RSPA 230) from Yazd, dated to 15 Ēsfand 1016 AY (1647)

Information
- Religion: Zoroastrianism
- Language: Avestan
- Period: Avestan period c. 1500–900 BCE (Gathas, Yasna Haptanghaiti), c. 900–400 BCE (Vendidad, Visperad, Yashts)

Full text
- Avesta at English Wikisource

The Avesta (Note: /əˈvɛstə/, Book Pahlavi: ʾp(y)stʾk' (abestāg), Persian: اوستا (avestâ)) is the corpus of religious texts of Zoroastrianism. All its texts are composed in the Avestan language and written in the Avestan alphabet. It represents the largest literature of the Old Iranian period and contains the oldest texts in any Iranian language.

The individual texts of the Avesta were originally oral compositions. They were composed over a long period of several centuries during the Avestan period (possibly ranging from the 15th century BCE to the 4th century BCE). The written transmission began much later during the Sasanian era (224 to 651 CE), with the creation of the Avestan alphabet. The resulting texts were then compiled into the multi-volume edition of the Sasanian Avesta. This edition was lost after the Islamic conquest of Iran, and only a small portion of it has survived, scattered across a number of individual manuscript traditions. The oldest surviving fragment of such a manuscript dates to 1323 CE.

These surviving manuscripts no longer contain the whole Avestan corpus but specific ritual or devotional texts. Important ritual texts are the Yasna, Visperad and Vendidad which are recited by priests in the eponymous Yasna, Visperad and Vendidad ceremonies. In contrast, devotional texts are used by both priests and lay people and compiled in the Khordeh Avesta or "Little Avesta" manuscripts. Aside from the Yashts, these manuscripts include the Nyayeshs, the Gāhs, the Sih-rozag and the Afrinagans.

== Name ==
The term Avesta originates from the 9th/10th-century works of Zoroastrian tradition in which the word appears as Middle Persian abestāg, Book Pahlavi ʾp(y)stʾkʼ. In that context, abestāg texts are portrayed as received knowledge and are distinguished from the exegetical commentaries (the zand) thereof.

The literal meaning of the word abestāg is uncertain; it is generally acknowledged to be a learned borrowing from Avestan, but none of the suggested etymologies have been universally accepted. The widely repeated derivation from *upa-stavaka is from Bartholomae, who interpreted abestāg as a descendant of a hypothetical reconstructed Old Iranian word for "praise-song" (Bartholomae: Lobgesang); but this word is not actually attested in any text.

== History ==
=== Zoroastrian tradition ===
The Zoroastrian history of the Avesta lies in the realm of legends and myths. The oldest surviving versions of these tales are found in the ninth- to 11th-century texts of the Zoroastrian tradition (i.e., the so-called "Pahlavi books"). The legends run as follows: The twenty-one nasks ("books") of the Avesta were created by Ahura Mazda and brought by Zoroaster to his patron Vishtaspa (Denkard 4A, 3A). Supposedly, Vishtaspa (Dk 3A) or another Kayanian, Daray (Dk 4B), then had two copies made, one of which was stored in the treasury and the other in the royal archives (Dk 4B, 5). Following Alexander's conquest, the Avesta was then supposedly destroyed or dispersed by the Greeks, after they had translated any scientific passages of which they could make use (AVN 7–9, Dk 3B, 8). Several centuries later, one of the Parthian emperors named Valaksh (one of the Vologases) supposedly then had the fragments collected, not only of those that had previously been written down, but also of those that had only been orally transmitted (Dk 4C).

The Denkard also records another legend related to the transmission of the Avesta. In this story, credit for collation and recension is given to the early Sasanian-era priest Tansar (high priest under Ardashir I, r. 224–242 CE, and Shapur I, 240/242–272 CE), who had the scattered works collected – of which he approved only a part as authoritative (Dk 3C, 4D, 4E). Tansar's work was then supposedly completed by Adurbad Mahraspandan (high priest of Shapur II, r. 309–379 CE) who made a general revision of the canon and continued to ensure its orthodoxy (Dk 4F, AVN 1.12–1.16). A final revision was supposedly undertaken in the 6th century CE under Khosrow I (Dk 4G).

=== Modern scholarship ===
Modern scholarship generally rejects the pre-Sasanian-era Zoroastrian history of the Avesta.Instead, there is now a wide consensus that for most of their long history, the Avesta's various texts were handed down orally and independently of one another. Based on linguistic aspects, scholars like Kellens, Skjærvø, and Hoffman have also identified a number of distinct phases, during which different parts of the Avestan corpus were composed, transmitted in either fluid or fixed form, as well as edited and redacted by the Zoroastrian priests.

==== Time and place of composition ====
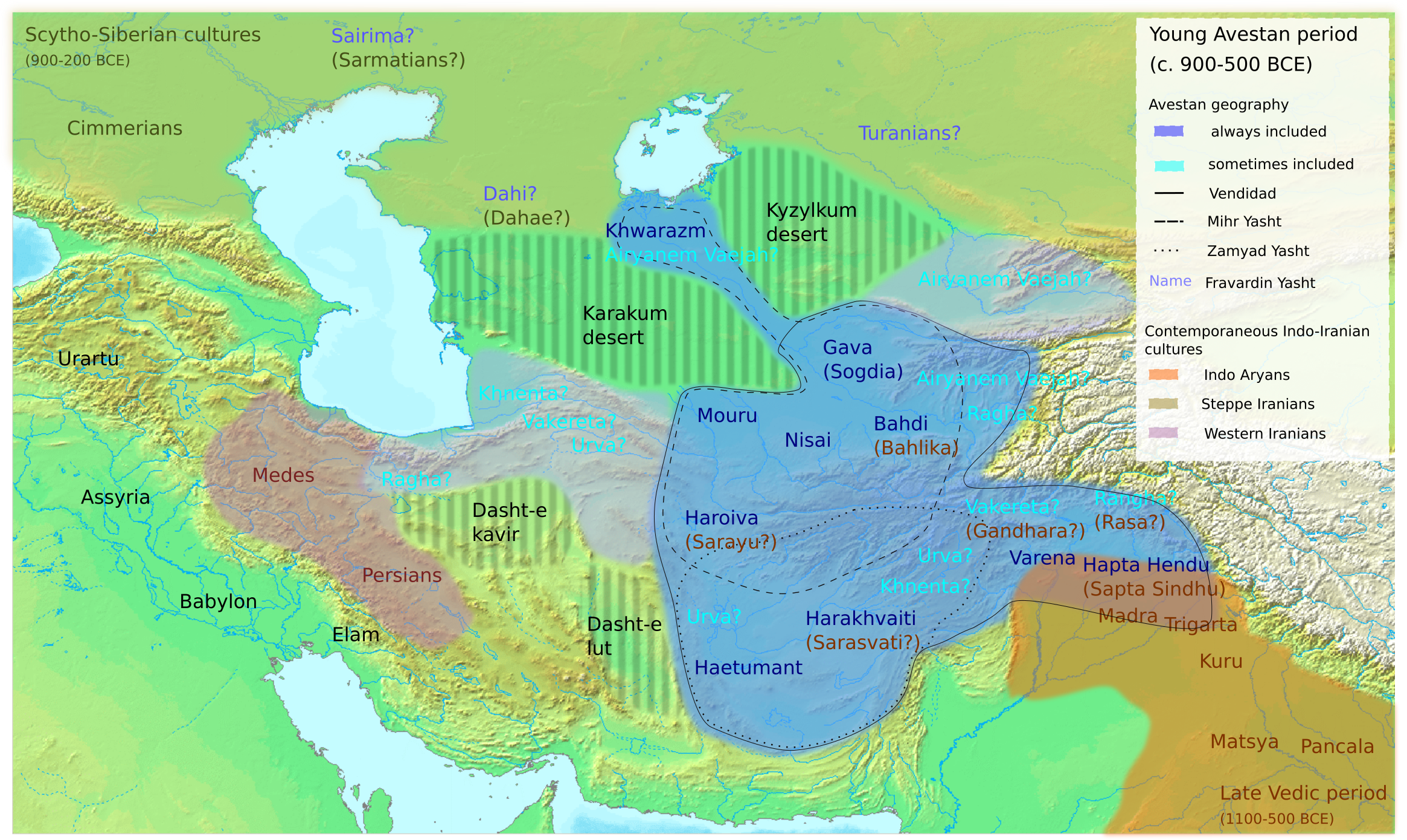
Geographical horizon of the toponyms found in the Young Avestan texts

The Avestan texts are grouped into two distinct layers: Old Avestan and Young Avestan, which belong to two different chronological strata. Regarding the Old Avestan material, scholars consider a time frame for its creation between 1500 and 900 BCE to be possible, with a date close to 1000 BCE being considered likely by many. There are no geographical references in the Old Avestan texts, which makes it impossible to specify where they were composed.

The Young Avestan texts, which form the majority of the extant Avesta, originated in a later stage of the Avestan period, separated from Old Avestan by several centuries. Scholars assume that this phase corresponds to a long time frame, possibly lasting from 900 to 400 BCE. In contrast to the Old Avestan texts, the Young Avestan parts contain a number of geographical references. As a result, there is a consensus that at least these texts were composed in the eastern portion of Greater Iran.

Some texts in the Avestan corpus, like the Vendidad or the Vishtasp Sast, show pronounced grammatical deficiencies. They seem to consist of proper Avestan phrases, which appear to have been pieced together by people who no longer had an active command of Avestan. This indicates that these texts were redacted from earlier, now lost sources, after Avestan ceased to be a spoken language.

==== Oral transmission ====
The Old Avestan texts must have crystallized early, meaning their transmission became fixed. Over their long history, the Gathic texts seem to have been transmitted with the highest accuracy. While the Old Avestan material was handed down as a fixed liturgical corpus, the Young Avestan texts appear to have been transmitted for some time in an oral tradition which was still fluid. This means they were composed partly afresh with each generation of poet-priests, sometimes with the addition of new material.

At some time, however, this fluid phase must have stopped completely and the process of transmission of the Young Avestan texts became fixed similar to the Old Avestan material. This second crystallization must still have taken place during the Old Iranian period, as Young Avestan does not show any characteristics of Middle Iranian. The subsequent transmission took largely place in Western Iran as evidenced by alterations introduced by native Persian speakers. Scholars like Skjærvø and Kreyenbroek correlate this second crystallization with the adoption of Zoroastrianism by the Achaemenids. As a result, Persian- and Median-speaking priests would have become the primary group to transmit these texts. Having no longer an active command of Avestan, they may have decided to preserve both Old and Young Avestan texts as faithfully as possible.

==== Written transmission ====
It was not until around the 5th or 6th century CE that the Avestan corpus was written down using the newly developed Avestan alphabet. This led to the creation of a comprehensive edition of the Avestan corpus, namely the Sasanian Avesta. This is seen as a turning point in the Avestan tradition since it separates the purely oral from the written transmission.

This edition was lost at some time after the fall of the Sasanian empire, and the oldest surviving manuscript (K1) (Note: K1 represents 248 leaves of a 340-leaf Vendidad Sade manuscript, i.e. a variant of a Yasna text into which sections of the Visperad and Vendidad are interleaved. The colophon of K1 (K=Copenhagen) identifies its place and year of completion to Cambay, 692Y (= 1323–1324 CE). The date of K1 is occasionally mistakenly given as 1184. This mistake is due to a 19th-century confusion of the date of K1 with the date of K1's source: in the postscript to K1, the copyist – a certain Mehrban Kai Khusrow of Navsari – gives the date of his source as 552Y (= 1184 CE). That text from 1184 has not survived.) of an Avestan text is dated to 1323 CE. The history of the Avesta until these first manuscripts appear is unknown, but the post-Sasanian phase saw a pronounced deterioration of the Avestan corpus. Summaries in the texts of the Zoroastrian tradition from the 9th/10th century indicate that the Sasanian Avesta was much larger than the Avesta that exists today. Only about one-quarter of the Avestan sentences or verses referred to by the 9th/10th century commentators can be found in the surviving texts. This suggests that an indeterminable number of juridical, historical, and legendary texts have been lost since then. On the other hand, it appears that the most valuable portions of the canon, including all of the oldest texts, have survived. The likely reason for this is that the surviving materials represent those portions of the Avesta that were in regular liturgical use and therefore known by heart by the priests and not dependent for their preservation on the survival of particular manuscripts.

== Avestan studies ==
Avestan manuscripts became available to European scholarship comparatively late, thus the study of Zoroastrianism in Western countries dates back to only the 18th century. Abraham Hyacinthe Anquetil-Duperron travelled to India in 1755, and discovered the texts among Indian Zoroastrian (Parsi) communities. He published a set of French translations in 1771. They were at first dismissed as a forgery in poor Sanskrit, but ultimately vindicated.

In the early 20th century, the Zoroastrian legend of the Parthian-era collation engendered a search for a 'Parthian archetype' of the Avesta. According to the theory of Friedrich Carl Andreas (1902), the archaic nature of the Avestan texts was assumed to be due to preservation via written transmission, and unusual or unexpected spellings in the surviving texts were assumed to be reflections of errors introduced by Sasanian-era transcription from the Aramaic alphabet-derived Pahlavi scripts. (Note: For a summary of Andreas' theory, see Schlerath (1987), pp. 29–30.) The search for the 'Arsacid archetype' was increasingly criticized in the 1940s and was eventually abandoned in the 1950s after Karl Hoffmann demonstrated that the inconsistencies noted by Andreas were actually due to unconscious alterations introduced by oral transmission. Hoffmann identifies these changes to be due, in part, to modifications introduced through recitation; (Note: For example, prefix repetition as in e.g. paitī ... paitiientī vs. paiti ... aiienī (Y. 49.11 vs. 50.9), or sandhi processes on word and syllable boundaries, e.g. adāiš for *at̰.āiš (48.1), ahiiāsā for ahiiā yāsā, gat̰.tōi for *gatōi (43.1), ratūš š́iiaoθanā for *ratū š́iiaoθanā (33.1).) in part to influences from other Iranian languages picked up on the route of transmission from somewhere in eastern Iran (i.e. Central Asia) via Arachosia and Sistan through to Persia; (Note: e.g. irregular internal hw > x^{v} as found in e.g. harax^{v}ati – 'Arachosia' and sāx^{v}an- 'instruction', rather than regular internal hw > ŋ^{v}h as found in e.g. aojōŋ^{v}hant – 'strong'.) and in part due to the influence of phonetic developments in the Avestan language itself. (Note: e.g. YAv. -ō instead of expected OAv. -ə̄ for Ir. -ah in almost all polysyllables.)

== Manuscripts ==
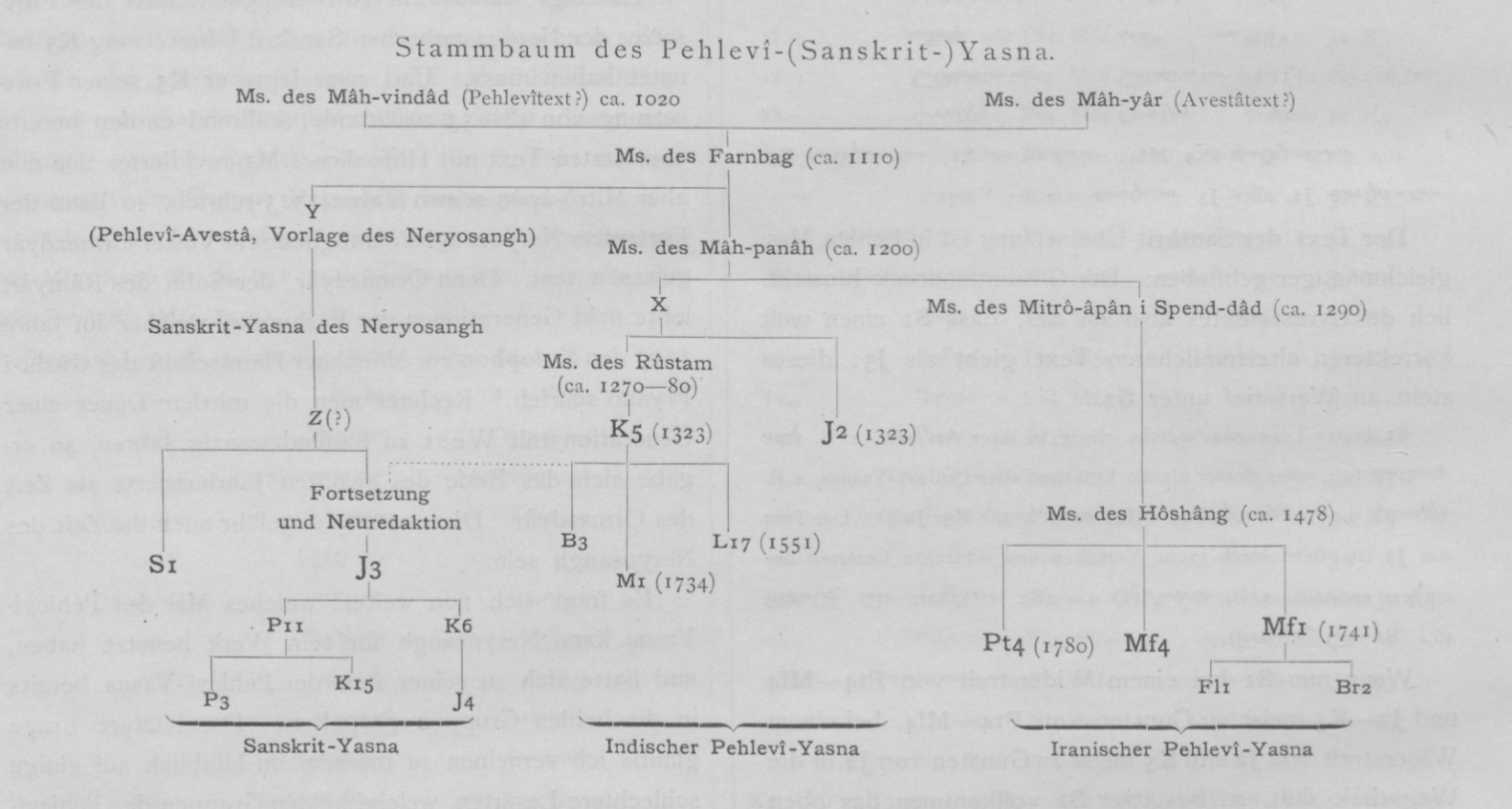
Stemmatics of the Pahlavi and Sanskrit Yasna manuscripts used by Geldner

After the loss of the Sasanian Avesta, the Avestan corpus survived through a number of manuscript traditions in Iran and India. None of these manuscripts contains the Avestan corpus as a whole. Instead, they correspond to a specific ritual and devotional use, and it is assumed that this use guaranteed their survival. The oldest surviving fragment of a manuscript dates to 1323 CE but most extant manuscripts date from after the 17th century. Today, more than 300 such manuscripts are catalogued. The most important analysis of Avestan manuscripts was provided by Geldner in his edition of the Avesta. In the Prolegomena to his edition, he provided a critical apparatus, detailing the stemmatics of the manuscripts he used.

In modern editions, specific manuscripts are typically classified according to several criteria. One criterion is, e.g., the specific liturgy, like the Yasna, Vendidad or Visperad, in which they are used. Another criterion is whether they originated within the Iranian or Indian Zoroastrian communities. In addition, manuscripts are classified according to their use. Manuscripts for liturgical purposes contain the Avestan text plus liturgical instructions. They are called Sade or Sadah, meaning pure since they contain no translations. On the other hand, manuscripts for exegetical purposes contain the Avestan text jointly with a translation. Most exegetical manuscripts have a translation into Middle Persian, called Pahlavi. But there are also some manuscripts with translations into Modern Persian, Sanskrit and Gujarati.

== Editions ==
The corpus of Avestan literature was produced during the Old Iranian Avestan period and transmitted within an oral culture of priestly composition. It was not until the Sasanian period, that the Zoroastrian priesthood produced an authoritative edition of this corpus. This edition is described in the Zoroastrian literature of the 10th century, but was lost at some undetermined time afterwards. Since then, no new authoritative edition of the scattered Avestan corpus has been produced by the Zoroastrian community.

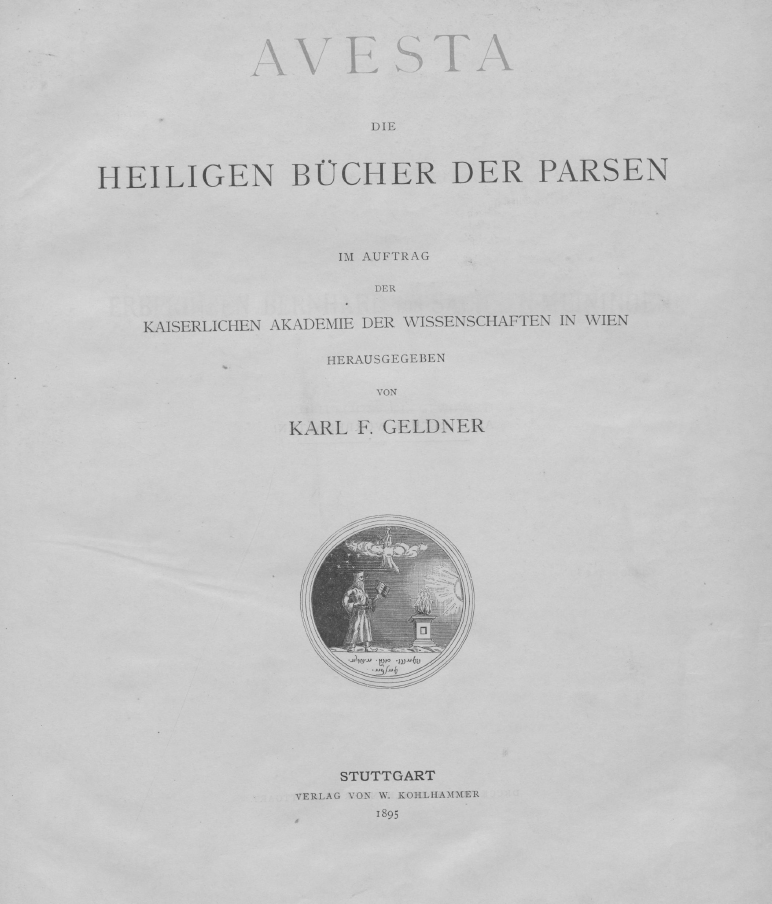
First page of Geldner's edition of the Avesta, widely considered to be the most important edition

After Avestan manuscripts became known in the Western world, several scholarly attempts were made to create a critical edition of the diverse manuscripts through which the, now much reduced, Avestan corpus had survived. The first critical edition was published in 1852 by Westergaard. It was based mostly on the manuscripts collected by Rask. Around the same time, Spiegel published an edition of the Zoroastrian High Liturgies, i.e., the Yasna, the Visperad and the Vendidad. Despite being smaller in scope and based on fewer manuscripts than Westergaard's edition, it is still considered relevant since it includes the Middle Persian translations jointly with the Avestan text. Between 1886 and 1896, Geldner produced an edition of the Yasna, the Visperad, the Khordeh Avesta, and the Vendidad. Although it lacked a few minor texts, included by Westergaard, it was based on significantly more manuscripts. As a result, it has remained the standard edition of the surviving Avestan corpus to this day. Overall, these works share the same editorial principle, which was to reproduce the earliest common ancestor of the manuscripts, therefore going back as close as possible to the Sasanian Avesta.

Since the publication of Geldner's edition, a number of developments have increased the need for a new edition. On the one hand many new manuscripts have been found, in particular in Iran. These new manuscripts have cast doubt on the, up to then, established opinion that all extant manuscripts derive from a single Sasanian archetype or, at least, some later hypearchetype. Furthermore, the surviving Avestan texts are nowadays recognized as a primarily liturgical corpus. This means the editorial principle of previous editions, i.e., the reconstruction of the Sasanian Urtext, does not apply. The surviving texts are instead increasingly seen as witnesses of a living liturgical tradition; a tradition which is much older and existed parallel to the exegetical tradition represented in the Sasanian Avesta.

These developments led to the creation of the Avestan Digital Archive (ADA) and the Corpus Avesticum Berolinense (CAB). ADA is a digital archive, which as of 2013 has digitized already 150 manuscripts and made 80 of them online available. Furthermore, CAB is a project which attempts to edit the manuscripts within their original ritual context.

== Structure and content ==
=== The Sasanian Avesta ===
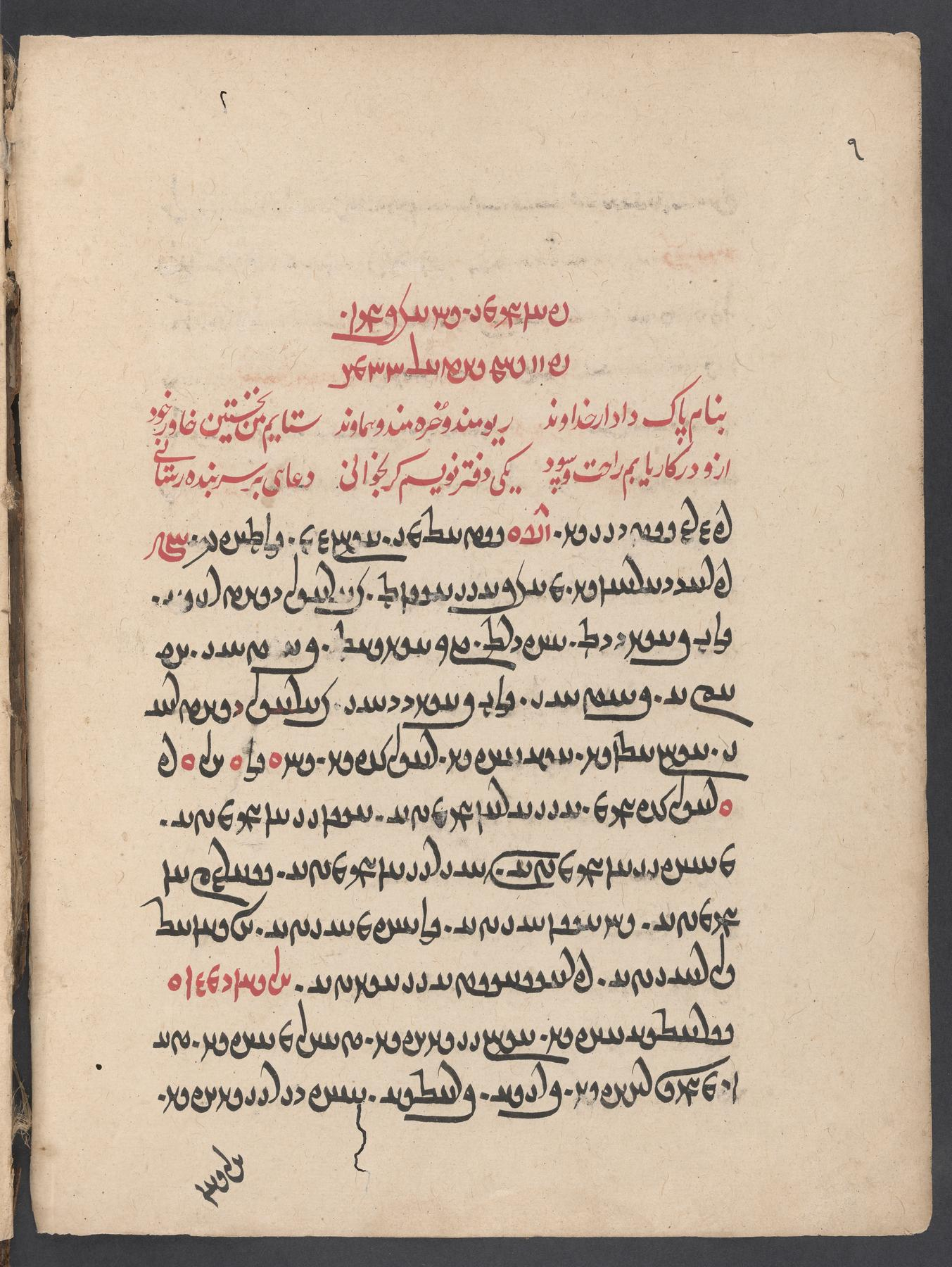
First page of an Iranian Sade manuscript of the Vendidad, the only volume of the Sasanian Avesta (called Juddēwdād therein) which has remained intact until today

According to the Denkard, the Avesta of the Sasanian period was organized into 21 nasks (volumes). This division was to mirror the structure of the 21-word-long Ahuna Vairya manthra: each of the three lines of the prayer consists of seven words. Correspondingly, the nasks are divided into three groups, of seven volumes per group. Originally, each volume had a word of the prayer as its name, which so marked a volume's position relative to the other volumes.

The first group of the nasks was the Gathic group. It contained the Gathas as well as long commentaries on them. It comprised the Stōd-yasn, the Sudgar, the Warshtmansr, the Bag, the Waštag, the Hadoxt and the Spand nask. Of these nasks, the Stod-yasn is extant in the Staota Yesnya, which forms the central portion of the High Liturgies like the Yasna and Visperad (see below). Parts of the Hadoxt nask may be extant through the Hadoxt nask fragments, while most other nasks are considered to be lost.

The second group was the manthric group. Its content has been interpreted as connecting the first and third group. It comprised the Dāmdād, the Nāxtar, the Pāzag, the Raθβištāiti, the Bariš, the Kaškaysraw and the Wištāsp-sāst nask. Only the Wištāsp-sāst nask may be extant in the Wishtasp Sast manuscripts (see below). All the other nasks are considered lost.

The third group was the legal group, meaning its content primarily covered topics of Zoroastrian jurisprudence. It comprised the Nikātum, the Duzd-sar-nizad, the Huspāram, the Sakātum, the Juddēwdād, the Čihrdād and the Bagān Yašt nasks. The Bagān Yašt nask contained most of the Yashts of the extant Avesta (see below), whereas the Huspāram nask contained the Herbedestan and Nerangestan texts, which are extant in the fragments collections (see below). The Juddēwdād nask ist the only nask of the Sasanian Avesta which has survived intact through the Vendidad manuscripts (see below), meaning that both its Avestan and Zand have remained the same. Of the other nasks, only fragments may have survived.

=== The extant Avesta ===
The extant Avestan manuscripts no longer follow the division into nasks as described for the Sasanian Avesta. Instead, they are typically associated with the specific liturgy or ceremonies they are used in. The following structure is derived from Geldner's edition of the Avesta. Unlike the Sasanian Avesta, which was produced by the Zoroastrian priesthood, this is a scholarly edition and it is consequently not canonical in a religious sense. It is, however, widely regarded to be the most important edition of the extant Avestan corpus and considered canonical for scholarly purposes. In this edition, Geldner included the most important Zoroastrian High Liturgies, namely the Yasna, the Visperad and the Vendidad, as well as the Khordeh Avesta, a collection of devotional texts and prayers aimed at lay people.

==== Yasna ====
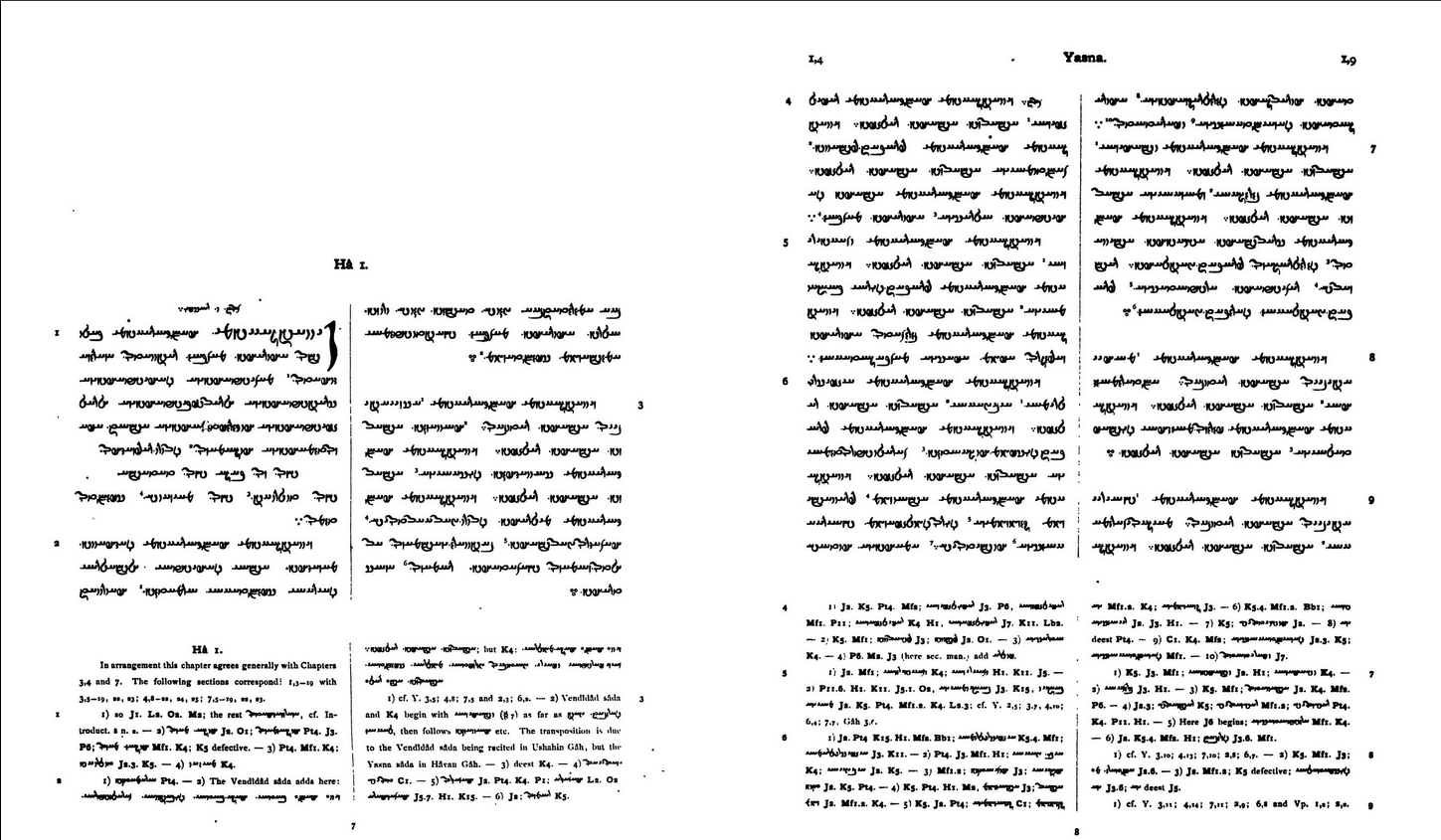
First two pages of the first chapter of the Yasna in Geldner's edition of the Avesta

The Yasna (from yazišn "worship, oblations", cognate with Sanskrit yajña) is an Avestan text recited during the primary Zoroastrian liturgy, namely the Yasna liturgy. It consists of 72 sections called the ha-iti or ha. Its central part, Yasna 14–58, consists of the Staota Yesnya, which formed one of the volumes of the Sasanian Avesta.

Being the most important liturgy, the Yasna is attested through a large number of manuscripts, which are grouped into six different manuscript types: The (i) Indian and (ii) Iranian Pahlavi Yasna, the (iii) Indian and (iv) Iranian Sade Videvdad, i.e., manuscripts which describe the Videwdad liturgy in which the Yasna is embedded, the (v) Sanskrit Yasna as well as the (vi) Yasna Sade. In Geldner's edition, the Yasna is edited in the first volume of his series.

==== Visperad ====
The Visperad (from vîspe ratavo, "(prayer to) all patrons") is an Avestan text named after the Visperad liturgy in which it is used. The text is divided into 24 sections called karde, which are interleaved into the slightly rearranged 72 has of the Yasna during the Visperad liturgy. For his edition, Geldner used 26 manuscripts, which fall into three different manuscript types. The first type are Vendidad Sade manuscripts of the Vendidad liturgy, which is an extension of the Visperad liturgy. The second type are Visperad Sade manuscripts, i.e., they contain the Avestan text of the Visperad liturgy. The third type are the Visperad Pahlavi manuscripts, which do, however, only contain the text unique to the Visperad liturgy, i.e., they lack the portions drawn from the Yasna liturgy. In his edition, Geldner edited the text according to the Visperad Sade manuscripts. It was published in the second volume of his series.

==== Khordeh Avesta ====
Khordeh Avesta manuscripts contain collections of Avestan texts, which are aimed at lay people. They, therefore, differ from the High Liturgies, like the Yasna, Visperad and Vendidad, which are only performed by priest, typically inside a fire temple. The content of different Khordeh Avesta manuscripts can differ widely, depending on the choices made by the editor(s). Most manuscripts contain the five Nyayesh, the five Gah, at least some of the Yashts, the 30 Sih-rozag and the four Afrinagan prayers.

- The Niyayishns, abbreviated Ny., are five prayers for regular recitation by both priests and laity. They are addressed to the Sun and Mithra (recited together thrice a day), to the Moon (recited thrice a month), and to the Waters and to Fire. The Niyayishns are composite texts containing selections from the Gathas and the Yashts, as well as later material.
- The Gāhs are five invocations to the five divinities that watch over the five divisions (gāhs) of the day. Gāhs are similar in structure and content to the five Niyayishns.
- The Yashts (from yešti, "worship by praise") are a collection of 21 hymns, each dedicated to a particular divinity or divine concept. They are extant through either pure Yasht manuscripts, which contain all 21 hymns, or through Khordeh Avesta manuscripts, most of which, however, only contain a selection of the most popular hymns. Due to this inconsistent editorial practice, the Yashts are placed differently within the Avestan corpus by modern authors. In Geldner's edition, they are placed within the Khordeh Avesta.
- The Sih-rozag ("thirty days") is an enumeration and invocation of the 30 divinities presiding over the days of the month. (cf. Zoroastrian calendar). The Sih-rozag exists in two forms, the shorter ("little Sih-rozag") is a brief enumeration of the divinities with their epithets in the genitive. The longer ("great Sih-rozag") has complete sentences and sections, with the yazatas being addressed in the accusative. The Sih-rozag is never recited as a whole, but is a source for individual sentences devoted to particular divinities, to be inserted at appropriate points in the liturgy depending on the day and the month.
- The Afrinagans are prayers recited during the Afrinagan ceremonies. The number of prayers in the manuscripts vary but most include four: the first in honor of the dead, the second on the five epagomenal days that end the year, the third is recited at the six seasonal feasts, and the fourth at the beginning and end of summer.

==== Vendidad ====
The Vendidad (or Vidēvdāt, a corruption of Avestan Vī-Daēvō-Dāta, "Given Against the Demons") is an Avestan text which is used during the Videvdad liturgy. This liturgy is an extension of the Visperad liturgy, itself an extension of the Yasna liturgy. The text consists of 22 sections, called fragards. They are framed using the so called frashna, i.e., a discussions between Ahura Mazda and Zoroaster. The Vendidad's different parts vary widely in character and in age. Some parts may have been composed during the Sasanian period although the greater part is very old.

The Vendidad originally was one of the legal nasks of the Sasanian Avesta, called Juddēwdād therein. This nask belonged to dādīg, i.e., legal, nasks and therefore, unlike the Yasna and the Visparad, it is a text dealing with laws rather than the record of a liturgical ceremony. Since the Vendidad includes all of the Juddēwdād nask, it is the only nask of the Sasanian Avesta that has survived in its original form.

The text is extant through two different manuscript traditions. The first are the so called Vendidad Pahlavi manuscripts. They contain the 22 fragards of the Vendidad jointly with the Zand. This manuscript type is, therefore, considered to go back directly to the Juddēwdād nask from the Sasanian Avesta. The other type are the Vendidad Sade manuscripts. They described the Vendidad liturgy as it is performed. Consequently, they contain the Avestan text of the 72 has of the Yasna, the 24 kardes of the Visperad and 22 fragards of the Vendidad text. For his edition of the Avesta, Geldner edited only the Avestan text of the 22 fragards.

==== Fragments ====
In his seminal edition of the Avesta, Geldner included only the most important ritual and devotional texts. Other authors, however, did compile a number of minor or incomplete Avestan texts. They are often referred to as fragments. There are altogether more than 20 fragment collections, many of which have no name (and are then named after their owner/collator) or only a Middle Persian name. The more important texts in this category are the Nerangestan, the Herbedestan, the Wishtasp Sast, the Hadoxt nask fragments. (see Sasanian Avesta) and the Pursishniha "questions," also known as "Fragments Tahmuras".

== Translations ==
It is generally assumed that the Sasanian Avesta not only consisted of a comprehensive edition of the Avestan corpus but also contained a full translation and commentary in Middle Persian, called Zand. This assumption is based on the observation that references to the Sasanian Avesta typically quote from the Middle Persian translation as well as the fact that those texts directly derived from it, namely the Vendidad, the Herbedestan and the Nerangestan, all include a Zand. The translations of these surviving texts is generally considered to be the oldest and most faithfull ones.

After the Avestan corpus became known in the West, a number of scholarly translation have been provided. The oldest translation of the Avesta into English was provided in the Sacred Books of the East series by James Darmesteter and Lawrence Heyworth Mills between 1880 and 1887. In addition, Darmesteter also published a translation of the Avesta into his native French between 1892 and 1893. These translations, however, were mostly based on the Middle Persian translation of the manuscripts. In 1910, Fritz Wolff produced a translation of the Avesta into German. This work was based on Geldner's edition and translated the Avestan text directly using Bartholomae's Altiranisches Wörterbuch. As a result, his translation is generally seen as superior.

== See also ==
- Avestan, the language of the Avesta
- Avestan geography, the geographical horizon of the Avesta
- Avestan period, the time period of the Avesta
- Zoroastrian literature
