= Damdad nask =

Zoroastrian religious literature

The Damdad nask is one of the lost nasks (volumes) of the Sasanian Avesta. Although no texts in the extant Avesta can be clearly identified as having belonged to it, its content can be reconstructed to some degree from references in later Zoroastrian writings.

== Sources ==
The nask itself is no longer extant. A short summary of its content is given in the Denkard (8.5), a 9th-10th century compendium of Zoroastrianism. In addition, the Rivayats by Kamah Bahram, Nareman Hoshang and Dastur Barzu Qiyamu-D-Din, a series of epistles from the 15th - 17th century, give a short overview on the content of the Damdad nask.

== Name ==
MacKenzie provides two possible derivations of the name. First, it may be derived from a hypothetical Avestan *dāmi.dāti, meaning "the creating of the creation". Alternatively, it may be derived from Middle Persian dām dād, meaning "he (Ohrmazd) created the creation". Regardless, the meaning of the name has been connected to the meaning of the name of the Chihrdad nask.

== In the Sasanian Avesta ==
The Sasanian Avesta was organized into 21 nasks, i.e., volumes, which were grouped into 3 divisions; the Gāhānīg (Gathic nasks), Hada Mānsrīg (manthras connected with the ritual), and Dādīg (legal nasks). Within this scheme, the Damdad nask was part of the ritual nasks and its content has been described as concerning matters of Zoroastrian cosmogony and eschatology.

Amid the Damdad are particulars about the maintenance of action and the production of the beneficial creatures. First, as to the spiritual existence, and how much and how is the maintenance in the spiritual existence; and the production of the worldly existence therefrom, qualified and constructed for descending (fitodano) into the combat with the destroyer, and accomplishing the associated necessity for the end and circumvention (garang) of destructiveness.

— Denkard 8.5 (translated by Edward William West).

According to the Denkard, the Damdad nask was the fourth of the nasks of the Sasanian Avesta. However, the Rivayats place it as the fifth. They also state that it consisted of 32 chapters. According to the estimate by Edward William West, the Damdad nask consisted of ca. 8,900 words of Avestan text, accompanied by ca. 29,300 words of commentary in Middle Persian.
