= Warshtmansr nask =

Zoroastrian religious literature

The Warshtmansr nask or Varshtmansr nask is the second nask (volume) of the Sasanian Avesta. Like most other nasks, it is no longer extant, but its content can be reconstructed from references in later Pahlavi writings and the parts still contained in the extant Avesta.

== Sources ==
The 8th book of the Denkard, a 9th-10th century compendium of Zoroastrianism, as well as a number of Rivayats, a series of epistles from the 15th - 17th century, list the content of the nask. In addition the 9th book of the Denkard provides a lengthy description its content.

== Name ==
In the Persian Rivayats, the Warshtmansr nask is called Wahišta-mānsar, meaning the best manthra. Modern scholarship agrees with the derivation of Middle Persian Mānsar from Avestan manthra, but regards the derivation of Warsht from vahištah (best) as erroneous. For instance, Edward William West translates it as "used as spells, or employed as liturgy". On the other hand, Vevaina derives Warsht from varz- (working/composing), which would lead to a translation of "working a manthra".

== In the Sasanian Avesta ==
The Sasanian Avesta was organized into 21 nasks, i.e., volumes, with each nask being in turn divided into several chapters. These 21 nasks are grouped into 3 divisions; the Gāhānīg (Gathic nasks), Hada Mānsrīg (manthras connected with the ritual), and Dādīg (legal nasks). Like the Sudgar and the Bag nask, the Warshtmansr nask was divided into 22 fragards (chapters), with all three providing commentary on the Staota Yenya, in particular the Gathas. Accordingly, it was placed into the first division of the nasks, i.e., the Gāhānīg group. Edward William West estimates, that the Warshtmansr nask consisted of ca. 8.300 words of Avestan text accompanied by ca. 18.500 words of commentary in Pahlavi.

== Content ==
The first fragard seems to have contained material on the life of Zarathustra. The last fragard, called Ērmān fragard (commenting on the Airyaman ishya manthra), seems to be preserved in form of Fragment Westergaard 4.1-3. Although the Warshtmansr nask belongs to the Gathic group, it seems to have contained material from the epic Yashts, in particular material related to Gayomard and Vishtaspa. Likewise, fragard 21 may have contained material about Axtya, a sorcerer and prominent, early opponent of the Zarathustra.

The Warshtmansr nask provided a number of important discussions of Zoroastrian topics. In one passage (Denkard 9.30.4-5), a discussion of the twin spirits, mentioned in Yasna 30.3, was provided. Therein, a, presumably Zurvanite, interpretation of Ahura Mazda and Angra Mainyu being brothers was rejected. In another passage (Denkard 9.43.7), a unique interpretation of Yasna 50.1-11 is found. Therein, the three steps taken by the priest during the Ab-Zohr are interpreted as corresponding to the Zoroastrian concept of good thoughts, good words, good deeds.
