= Sakatum nask =

Zoroastrian legal text

The Sakatum nask or Sagadum nask was one of the legal nasks (volumes) of the Sasanian Avesta. No parts of it are known to have survived, but later references show that it covered, e.g., topics like family or property law.

== Sources ==
The Sakatum nask itself is no longer extant but references are found in later Zoroastrian writings. First, the 8th book of the Denkard provides in section 8.38-8.43 a description of its content. In addition, the Rivayats, a series of exchanges from the 15th - 17th century, give a short overview on the content of the Sakatum nask.

== Structure and content ==
The Sasanian Avesta was organized into 21 nasks, i.e., volumes, which were grouped into 3 divisions; Gathic, ritual, and legal nasks. Within this scheme, the Sakatum nask belonged to the legal nasks. Edward William West estimates, that it consisted of ca. 53.000 words of Avestan text accompanied by ca. 476,600 words of commentary in Pahlavi, which would make it the second longest nask after the Nikatum nask. According to the Denkard, the Sakatum nask consisted of 30 chapters, whereas the Rivayats name 52 chapters. Whereas not much information is provided in the Rivayats, the description in the Denkard (8.38-43) coveres the first six chapters.

== Topics ==
The first section in Denkard 8.38 covered topics family and public topics. The second section in Denkard 8.39, called Hachidakânistân (lost property code), dealt with lost property. The third section in Denkard 8.40, called Ziyanakistan (fertile cattle code), covered live and dead cattle. The fourth section in Denkard 8.41, called Vakhshistan (increase code), covered financial law. The fifth section in Denkard 8.42, called Varistan (ordeal code), covered ordeal by fire. Finally, the sixth and last section in Denkard 8.43, covered miscellaneous topics.
