= Duzd-sar-nizad nask =

Zoroastrian legal text

The Duzd-sar-nizad nask was one of the legal nasks (volumes) of the Sasanian Avesta, describing matters of Zoroastrian jurisprudence. No parts of it are known to have survived but later descriptions demonstrate it covered diverse topics such as rules during war, or animal rights.

== Sources ==
The nask itself is no longer extant but references are found in later Zoroastrian writings. First, the 8th book of the Denkard provides in chapters 8.21-27 an overview over seven of its sections. In addition, the Rivayats, a series of exchanges from the 15th - 17th century, give a short description of the content of the Duzd-sar-nizad nask.

== Structure and content ==
The Sasanian Avesta was organized into 21 nasks, i.e., volumes, which were grouped into 3 divisions; Gathic, ritual, and legal nasks. Within this scheme, the Duzd-sar-nizad nask belonged to the legal nasks. Edward William West estimates, that it consisted of ca. 28,000 words of Avestan text accompanied by ca. 251,500 words of commentary in Pahlavi. According to the Denkard, the Duzd-sar-nizad consisted of 18 chapters although only seven are described in detail. According to the Rivayats, however, it consisted of 65 chapters.

== Topics ==
The legal topics discussed in the Duzd-sar-nizad derived from the pre-Sasanian time, but some of its harsher elements may have been mitigated during the Sasanian Empire. Like the other legal nasks, the Duzd-sar-nizad covered a wide range of judicial topics. The first section, described in Denkard 8.21, covered topics involving thieves and robbers. The second section, described in Denkard 8.22, covered family law (Amēxtag). The third section is described in Denkard 8.23. It was known as the "Shepherd's dog code" (Pasušhōrwestān) and covered the rights and duties of shepherd's dogs. The fourth section was described in Denkard 8.24. It was called the "draft-animal code" (Stōrestān) and covered penalties for harming draft animals and cattle. The fifth section was described in Denkard 8.25. It was called the "Value code" (Arzestān) and covered the value of different kind of properties. The sixth section was described in Denkard 8.26. It was called the "Warrior code" (Artēštārestān) and covered a wide range of topics concerning the rules during armend conflicts. Finally, the last section was described in Denkard 8.27. It was called the "Miscellany" (Amēxtag) and consequently covered a diverse range of topics like guarding fire, grooming horses, wearing garments or forms of ownership.
