= Husparam nask =

Zoroastrian religious literature

The Husparam nask is the seventeenth nask (volume) of the Sasanian Avesta. The work itself is lost, but its content can be reconstructed from references in Book 8 of the Denkard and the Rivayats. The Nerangestan and Herbedestan are considered to have originally been part of this nask.

== Sources ==
The nask itself is no longer extant. Some information on its content are given in Book 8 of the Denkard, a 9th-10th century compendium of Zoroastrianism. In addition, the Rivayats, a series of epistles from the 15th - 17th century, give a short overview on the content of the Husparam nask.

== In the Sasanian Avesta ==
The Sasanian Avesta was organized into 21 nasks, i.e., volumes, which were grouped into 3 divisions; the Gāhānīg (Gathic nasks), Hada Mānsrīg (manthras connected with the ritual), and Dādīg (legal nasks). Within this scheme, the Husparam nask was part of the legal nasks and it content, consequently covered a wide range of legal topics. It consisted of either 30 or 60 fragards (chapters) depending on the source. Edward William West estimates, that the Husparam nask consisted of ca. 44.900 words of Avestan text accompanied by ca. 403.600 words of commentary in Pahlavi, making it the third longest nask overall.

== In the extant Avesta ==
Two texts in the extant Avesta are considered to have been part of the Husparam nask, namely the Nerangestan and Herbedestan. The Herbedestan is mainly a text concerned with the education of Zoroastrian priests, namely the Herbeds. The Nirangestan follows the Herbedestan in the extant text and covers matters of the ritual. Together with the Vendidad, these two texts comprise the only surviving parts of the legal nasks and represent the remnants of the Zoroastrian learned tradition, compared to the liturgical tradition that forms the rest of the extant Avesta.
