= Wishtasp-sast nask =

Zoroastrian religious text

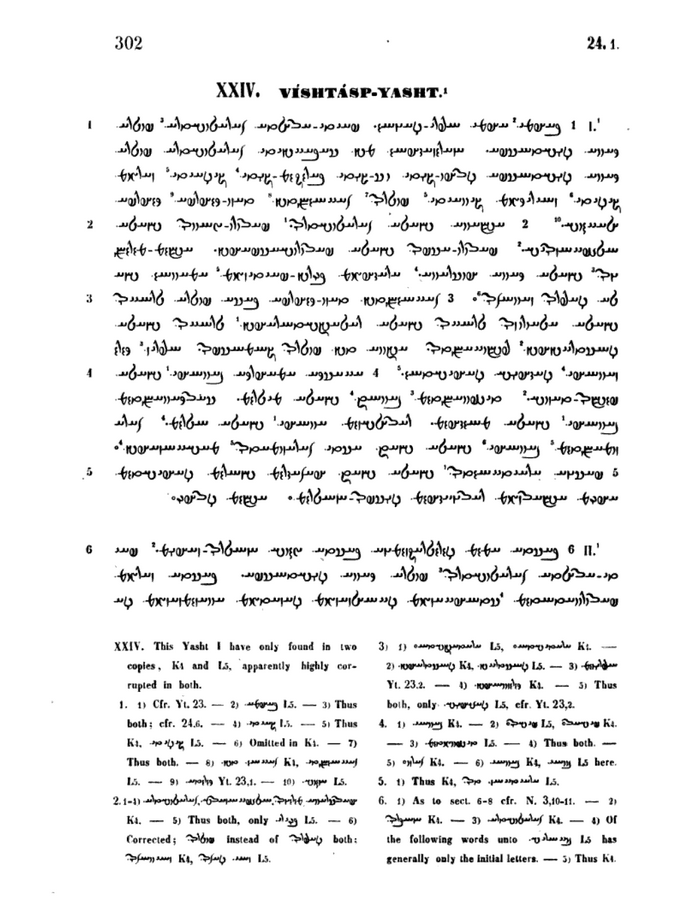
- First page of the Vishtasp Yasht in Westergaard's edition, which may contain, in whole or in parts, the Wishtasp-sast nask.

Information
- Religion: Zoroastrianism
- Language: Avestan
- Chapters: 8

The Wishtasp-sast or Vishtasp-sast nask was the 10th nask (volume) of the Sasanian Avesta. The work is now lost, but according to later references, it contained a detailed history of Vishtaspa, an early patron of Zarathustra. The Wishtasp-sast nask may, in whole or in parts, be preserved through the Wishtasp Sast manuscripts.

== Sources ==
The Wishtasp-sast nask itself is no longer extant but references are found in later Zoroastrian writings. First, the 8th book of the Denkard provides in chapter 11 a description of its content. In addition, the Rivayats, a series of exchanges from the 15th - 17th century, give a short overview.

== Name ==
The name of this nask is reported differently in the sources. In the Denkard, the nask is called Wishtasp-sast, whereas in the Rivayats, the names Wishtasp-shah or Wishtaspad are used. Modern authors also use different spellings based on the Avestan or Middle Persian version of Vishtaspa's name or use sasto instead of sast. Being at variant with the names used in the sources, Jean Kellens uses the name Vishtasp Yasht for the nask (see below). The name itself has been interpreted as meaning "Instructions to Wishtasp" or "Instruction of Wishtasp".

== Structure ==
The Sasanian Avesta was organized into 21 nasks, i.e., volumes, which were grouped into 3 divisions; Gathic, ritual, and legal nasks. Within this scheme, the Wishtasp-sast nask belonged to the ritual nasks. According to the Denkard, it was the 10th nask, whereas the Rivayats name it as the 11th. The Rivayats furthermore state that it consisted originally of 60 chapters but that after the conquest of Alexander the Great, only ten (according to Kamah Bahram and Nareman Hoshang) or eight (according to Dastur Barzu Qiyamu-D-Din) of its chapters could be recovered. Edward William West estimates, that it consisted of ca. 2,200 words of Avestan text accompanied by ca. 7,200 words of translation and commentary in Pahlavi, which would make it the shortest nask.

== Connection to the Wishtap Sast ==
The Wishtasp Sast is an Avestan texts known through a series of manuscripts. According to the Pahlavi instructions provided along with the Avestan texts, the Wishtasp Sast was once using during the Wishtasp Yasht ceremony. This liturgy consisted of the Wishtasp Sast text intercalated into the Yasna and Visperad. It was therefore similar to the Vendidad liturgy, where the respective text is likewise intercalated into the Yasna and Visperad.

The Wishtap Sast has been connected by various authors to the Wishtasp-sast nask. West, for example connects the information in the Rivayats about the Wishtasp-sast with the Wishtasp Sast. Likewise, Kellens labels the Wishtasp-sast as Wishtasp Yasht and list both the extant Wishtasp Sast (Yt. 24) and the Afrin-Paighamber-Zartusht (Yt. 23) as the surviving parts of this nask. This connection between the Wishtasp-sast and the Wishtasp Sast is, however, not universally accepted.
