= Middle Persian literature =

Written works composed in Middle Persian

Middle Persian literature is the corpus of written works composed in Middle Persian, that is, the Middle Iranian dialect of Persia proper, the region in the south-western corner of the Iranian plateau. Middle Persian was the prestige dialect during the Sasanian era. It is the largest source of Zoroastrian literature.

The Sasanian dynasty (224–654 CE) were natives of that south-western region, and through their political and cultural influence, Middle Persian became a prestige dialect and thus also came to be used by non-Persian Iranians. Following the Arab conquest of the Sasanian Empire in the 7th century, shortly after which Middle Persian began to evolve into New Persian, Middle Persian continued to be used by the Zoroastrian priesthood for religious and secular compositions. These compositions, in the Aramaic-derived Book Pahlavi script, are traditionally known as "Pahlavi literature". The earliest texts in Zoroastrian Middle Persian were probably written down in the late Sasanian era (6th–7th centuries), although they represent the codification of earlier oral tradition. However, most texts, including the Zend commentaries and translations of the Zoroastrian canon, date from the 9th to the 11th century, when Middle Persian had long ceased to be a spoken language, so they reflect the state of affairs in living Middle Persian only indirectly. The surviving manuscripts are usually 14th-century copies.

Other, less abundantly attested varieties of Middle Persian literature include the 'Manichaean Middle Persian' corpus, used for a sizable amount of Manichaean religious writings, including many theological texts, homilies and hymns (3rd–9th, possibly 13th century). Even less-well attested are the Middle Persian compositions of Nestorian Christians like Mar Maʿna, evidenced in the Pahlavi Psalter (7th century); these were used until the beginning of the second millennium in many places in Central Asia, including Turfan (in present-day China) and even localities in Southern India.

== Subgroups ==
=== "Pahlavi" literature ===
"Pahlavi literature traditionally defines the writings of the Zoroastrians in the Middle Persian language and Book Pahlavi script which were compiled in the 9th and the 10th centuries AD."

The literary corpus in Middle Persian in Book Pahlavi consists of:

- translations and commentaries (zand) of the Avesta.
- other exegetical compositions on religious subjects.
- compositions on non-religious subjects.

These divisions are not mutually exclusive. Several different literary genres are represented in Pahlavi literature.

Zand texts

The zand corpus include exegetical glosses, paraphrases, commentaries and translations of the Avesta's texts. Although such exegetical commentaries also exist in other languages (including Avestan itself), the Middle Persian zand is the only to survive fully, and is for this reason regarded as 'the' zand.

With the notable exception of the Yashts, almost all surviving Avestan texts have their Middle Persian zand, which in some manuscripts appear alongside (or interleaved with) the text being glossed. These glosses and commentaries were not intended for use as theological texts by themselves but for religious instruction of the (by then) non-Avestan-speaking public. In contrast, the Avestan language texts remained sacrosanct and continued to be recited in the Avestan language, which was considered a sacred language.

Other exegetical works

The corpus of medieval texts of Zoroastrian tradition include around 75 works, of which only a few are well known:

- the Denkard, "Acts of Religion", is an encyclopedic compendium of Sasanian era beliefs and customs.
- the Bundahishn, "Original Creation", is an important source of information on Zoroastrian cosmogony.
- Manushchihr's Dadestan-i Denig ("Religious Decisions") and Epistles
- the Vichitakiha i Zatsparam, the "Treatises of Zatsparam", by Manushchihr's brother Zatsparam.
- the Arda-Viraf Namag relates the dream-journey of a devout Zoroastrian (the 'Viraf' of the story) through the next world.
- the Daedestan i Menog-i Khrad, "Judgments of the Spirit of Wisdom", is an andarz text (a class of Iranian wisdom literature) in which a figure named Danag (lit: "wise, knowing") participates in a question-and-answer dialog with Menog-i Khrad, the Spirit of Wisdom.
- the Jamasp Namag, "Book of Jamaspi", also known as the Ayadgar i Jamaspig "(In) Memoriam of Jamasp", is a compendium of essential doctrine, together with basic myth, legend, history, and some pseudo-prophetic matters cast as a series of revelations by Jamasp through the model of a question-and-answer dialog with Vishtasp.
- the Zand-i Wahman yasn is another pseudo-prophetic text, in this case cast as a question-and-answer dialog between Zoroaster and Ahura Mazda, in which the latter gives his prophet the ability to see into the future.
- the Shikand-gumanig Vizar, a partly apologetic and partly polemic review of other religions.
- the Shāyest nē Shāyest, "(On what is) Proper and Improper", a compilation of miscellaneous laws and customs regarding sin and impurity, with other memoranda about ceremonies and religious subjects in general.
- the Zaratosht-nama, an epic poem about the life of Zarathustra.
- the Wizidagiha-i Zadspram, a text on the creation of the world, life of Zoroaster, and the eschatological end

Secular compositions

A manuscript known as the "miscellaneous codex" or MK (after Mihraban Kay-Khusraw, the Indian Zoroastrian (Parsi) copyist who created it), dated to 1322 but containing older material, is the only surviving source of several secular Middle Persian works from the Sassanian period. Among the texts included in the unique MK are:

- the Kar-Namag-i Ardasher-i Pabagan is a hagiography of Ardashir I, the founder of the Sassanid dynasty
- the Ayadgar-i Zareran, the "Memorial or Zarer", is the only surviving specimen of Iranian epic poetry composed in Middle Persian.
- the Šahrestānīhā ī Ērānšahr, is a catalogue of the four regions of the Sassanid empire with mythical and/or historical stories related to their founding.
- several andarz texts, the Iranian type of wisdom literature containing advice and injunctions for proper behavior.
- the Wizarishn i Chatrang, "Explanation of Chess", also known as the Chatrang Namag, is a humorous story of how an Indian king sent a game of chess to the Sassanid court to test Iranian wits, in response to which a priest invented backgammon to challenge the Indian king.
- the Drakht-i Asurig, "the Assyrian tree", is an originally Parthian poem recast into Book Pahlavi but retaining many Parthian phrases and idioms.
- the Abdih ud Sahigih i Sagistan is a description of the "Wonders and Remarkable Features of Sistan".
- the Khusraw wa Redag, "Khusraw and the Page", is an account of a conversation between the king and a young boy who would like to be a page. This work is a source of information on the sensual delights of the Sassanian court.
- the Mah Farwardin Roz Khurdad is a book that described all the events which historically or mythically occurred on the 6th day of the Persian month of Farvardin.

Especially important to cultural and law historians is the Madayan i Hazar Dadestan, "Book of a Thousand Judgements", a 7th-century compilation of actual and hypothetical case histories collected from Sassanian court records and transcripts. Only a single manuscript of this unique text survives.

Scribes also created several glossaries for translating foreign languages. Of these, two have survived:

- Frahang-i Pahlavig, a glossary of common Aramaic heterograms (huzvarishn) used in written Middle Persian.
- Frahang-i Oim-evak, a dictionary of Avestan words and phrases.

Several other works, now lost, are known of from references to them in other languages. Works of this group include:

- in about the 5th century, priests attached to the Sassanid court began to compile an immense chronicle, the Khwaday Namag ("Book of Kings"), a legendary genealogy of the Sassanid kings in which the Sassanians were dynastically linked to Vishtaspa, i.e. Zoroaster's patron and the legendary founder of the mythological Kayanian dynasty. The original Middle Persian version of the chronicle has been lost, and the contents survive only through Arabic translations and in a versified New Persian version, the Shahnameh by Firdausi, finished around 1000 AD.
- the Kalīla wa-Dimna, a Middle Persian translation of the Indian Panchatantra (in Sanskrit). The Middle Persian work survives only as a translation into Syriac and two centuries later into Arabic by Ibn al-Muqaffa.
- the Letter of Tansar, a rationale for Ardashir's seizure of the throne. The letter was translated into Arabic in the 9th century by Ibn al-Muqaffa, and from Arabic into New Persian in the 13th century History of Tabaristan by Ibn Isfandiar.
- the Ayadgar-i Anosherwan, which has survived as an Arabic translation in a section of Ebn Meskavayh's Tajarib al-Umam.

== Full texts ==
- Avesta-Zoroastrian Archives, includes Middle Persian writings in English translation
- Scholar Raham Asha's website, includes many texts in original and English translation (some also on the
- parsig.org)
- A Large Online Pahlavi Library, contains pdfs of many Pahlavi manuscripts in its original script, many with transcriptions and translations.
- Kassock Pahlavi Reproductions, a small company that provides many reprints of Pahlavi books and manuscripts. Kassock also writes guides for students learning Pahlavi for select books.
