= Vaetha nask =

Zoroastrian religious text

The Vaetha nask is the name of a short Avestan text, which is extant through only eight manuscripts. Despite its name, the Vaetha nask was not part of the 21 nasks of the Sasanian Avesta and its origins remain unclear.

== Name ==
The Vaetha nask is not referenced in other Avestan literature. Its name is instead derived from the first words in the text reading: vaeθā daēniiå māzdaiiasnōiš ahurahē mazda mraōt̰, which translates to "the knowledge of the Mazdayasnian religion, Ahura Mazdā said." The Avestan term is commonly transliterated into Latin and Greek script phonetically as either vaēθā or vaēϑā.

== Content ==
The text of the Vaetha nask covers various topics. A major focus is the marital relationship between Zoroastrians and non-Zoroastrians, children born from such a union, their inheritance and conversions to Zoroastrianism. It has been speculated that this topic reflects the situation when Zoroastrianism existed as a minority religion and the problems arising from that situation. Large parts of the text are quotations from the Vendidad, whereas other parts mirror passages in the Frahang-i Oim-evak.

== Provenance ==
According to the text itself, the Vaetha nask was one of the fragards, i.e., chapters, of the Nikatum nask, which in turn was one of the 21 nasks, i.e., volumes, of the Sasanian Avesta. This origin was accepted initially by Western scholars. Due to the corrupt Avestan and Middle Persian of the text, however, this provenance was soon doubted. According to F. M. Kotwal for example, the text is a 19th century forgery. In their 1969 edition of the text, Humbach and Kaikhusroo, however, assumed it to be an apocryphical text, which predates the 18th century. More recently, Hamid Moein has also affirmed its apocryphical nature.

== Manuscripts ==
The Vaetha nask is extant through eight manucripts belonging to two different manuscript traditions: one with the Avestan text alone and one with a translation and commentary in Middle Persian. A complete list of all available manuscripts was presented by Humbach and Kaikhusroo in their 1969 edition of the text. Digital versions of manuscripts F3d and T38 are available through the Avestan Digital Archive.
