= Sasanian Avesta =

Sasanian period anthology of sacred literature of Zoroastrianism

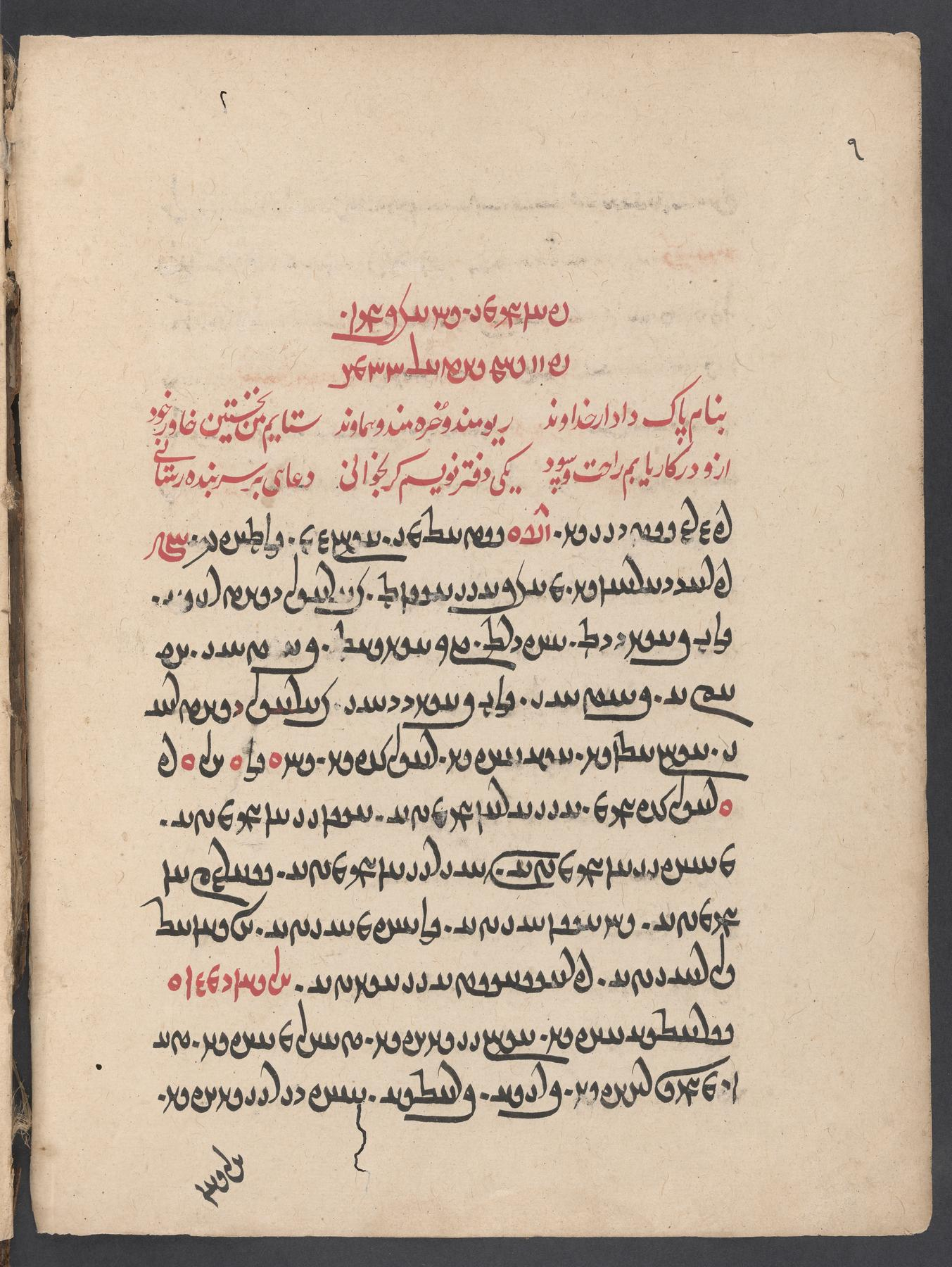
- First page of a Vendidad Sade manuscript (called Juddēwdād in the Sasanian Avesta), the only nask which has remained intact until today

Information
- Religion: Zoroastrianism
- Language: Avestan
- Period: Sasanian period
- Books: 21

Full text
- Avesta at English Wikisource

The Sasanian Avesta or Great Avesta refers to the anthology of Zoroastrian literature produced during the Sasanian period. They are said to have been written down during the reign of Khosrow. Most of this work is now lost, but its content and structure can be reconstructed from references found in a number of texts from the 9th century onward.

Compared to the extant Avesta, the Sasanian Avesta was much larger and organized into 21 distinct volumes called nasks (Avestan: naska; Middle Persian: nask, 'bundle'). Of those, only one is preserved in its entirety, while others are either lost or only preserved in fragments.

== Sources ==
The most important source on the Sasanian Avesta is the Denkard, a 9th-10th century compendium of Zoroastrianism. The 8th and 9th book of the Denkard give an overview of the Avesta as it was available at the time. Whereas the 8th book lists the content, the 9th book provides a lengthy summary on a number of its nasks In addition, the Rivayats, a series of epistles from the 15th - 17th century, also list its content but do not provide further summaries. In general, the information provided by the Denkard is considered to be more reliable than the Rivayats.

== Name ==
The Sasanian Avesta is never called Avesta in the sources. Instead, it is called the "collection of the Den". Its modern name was coined due to its connection to the extant Avesta. To distinguish both, authors have used terms like Sasanian Avesta or Great Avesta.

== Content ==
The Sasanian Avesta was organized into 21 nasks, i.e., volumes, with each nask being in turn divided into several chapters. These 21 nasks are grouped into 3 divisions; the Gāhānīg (Gathic nasks), Hada mānsrīg (manthras connected with the ritual), and Dādīg (legal nasks). This threefold division of the 21 nasks was modelled after the three lines and 21 words of the Ahuna vairya manthra, the most important Zoroastrian prayer.

=== Gathic (Gāhānīg) nasks ===
The Gathic nasks contain commentaries on the Gathas of Zarathustra and are consequently named after them. The Denkard also associates the Gathic nasks with the menogic world, i.e., the ideal and invisible aspect of existence. Not all content can be identified with certainty, but some of the nasks seem to have contained additional material on Zarathustra's life.

Contents of the Gathic nasks of the Sasanian Avesta
No	Name	Chapters	Surviving texts	Topic
21.	Stōd-yasn	-	Staota Yesnya	-
1.	Sūdgar	22	fragments	commentaries on the Gathas
2.	Warštmānsr	22	unknown	commentaries on the Gathas
3.	Bag	22	Y. 19-22	commentaries on the Gathas
11.	Waštag	unknown	lost	unknown
20.	Hādōxt	133 (134)	Y. 58	various texts
13.	Spand	-	fragments	legend of Zarathustra

Although the Stōd-yasn is placed as the first nask of the Gathic group, book 8 of the Denkard places it last in the list of all the 21 nasks of the Sasanian Avesta. It has been speculated that this may have been to convey the cyclical and interconnected nature of the texts within the Sasanian Avesta. The Waštag nask is not described in any of the sources, indicating that it was already lost in its entirety by the 9th century.

=== Ritual (Hada mānsrīg) nasks ===
The ritual nasks, called Hada mānsrīg, form the second division of the Sasanian Avesta. They are placed between the Gathic nasks, dealing with the menogic world of thought, and the legal nasks, dealing with the getic world of action. Their purpose has, therefore, been interpreted as connecting both these worlds by virtue of the ritual.

Contents of the Gathic nasks of the Sasanian Avesta
No	Name	Chapters	Surviving texts	Topic
4.	Dāmdād	32	fragments	cosmogony
5.	Nāxtar	-	lost	unknown
6.	Pāzag	-	Gah and Siroza	division of night and day
7.	Raθβištāiti	-	fragments	arrangement of the sacrifice
8.	Bariš	-	fragments	religious ethics
9.	Kaškaysraw	-	fragments	how to annul a badly made sacrifice
10.	Wištāsp-sāst	-	Vishtasp Sast	legends of Vishtaspa

Of the ritual nasks, the Vishtasp-sast nask may have survived in form of the Vishtasp Sast. Of the others, none have survived in its entirety and most are considered lost or highly fragmentary. In addition, the Denkard does only provide short summaries for most of the nasks, which makes a reconstruction of their original content difficult. The Denkard, furthermore, states that no Zand exists for the Nāxtar nask, indicating that by the 9th century it had already been lost.

=== Legal (Dād) nasks ===
The legal nasks, called Dād, form the third division of the Sasanian Avesta. The Denkard associates the legal nasks with the getig world, i.e., the tangible and visible aspect of existence. This division, therefore, forms the complement to the menogic world covered in the Gathic nasks.

This division contains five actually legal (dādīg) nasks (Nikātum, Duzd-sar-nizad, Huspāram, Sakātum, and the Juddēvdād) as well as two miscellaneous nasks (Čihrdād and Bagān Yašt). The Čihrdād nask contains a mythical history of Iran, which makes it particularly stand out from the others. Its inclusion may have been due to a misinterpretation of the second element of its name as dād (law), whereas a derivation from *čiθrō.dāti (the establishment of the origins) is considered more likely.

Contents of the legal nasks of the Sasanian Avesta
No	Name	Chapters	Surviving texts	Topic
15.	Nikātum	30	fragments	law book
16.	Duzd-sar-nizad	18	fragments	law book
17.	Huspāram	30	Nerangestan, Herbedestan	law book
18.	Sakātum	30	fragments	law book
19.	Juddēwdād	22 (23)	Videvdad	law book
12.	Čihrdād	-	fragments	mythical history of Iran
14.	Bagān Yašt	17	Y. 9-11, 57; Yt. 5-19	hymn to deities

According to the listing in the Denkard, the 12th chapter of the Juddēwdād was already lost at the time. Despite this, it is the only nask that has remained intact since then. This survival may be due to its use in the corresponding ceremony. The other two longer texts that survive are the Nīrangestān and the Hērbedestān from the Huspāram nask.

== Connection to the extant Avesta ==
There is no consensus on the relationship between the Sasanian Avesta and the extant Avesta. Both show several differences. First, comparing the number of chapters, the Sasanian Avesta seems to have been substantially larger. Edward William West, for example, estimates, that all 21 nasks combined added up to ca. 345,700 words of Avestan text plus ca. 2,094,200 words of Middle Persian commentary. The text in Avestan alone would therefore have been about four times as large as the one still preserved today. Next, the Sasanian Avesta is structured into nasks which seem to be grouped according to their thematic content, whereas the extant Avestan texts are grouped according to the rituals they are used in. Finally, only the Gathic nasks show a clear relationship to the texts we have today, whereas most of the material in the legal nasks as well as almost all of the material in the ritual nasks can not be identified in the extant texts and is considered lost.

The traditional view is that the ritually-oriented Avesta we have today formed as remnants of the Sasanian Avesta, mostly the portions contained in the Gathic nasks. According to this view, only some portions of the Sasanian Avesta were used in the liturgies. The surviving texts are, therefore, those which were in regular use, whereas the exegetically-oriented Sasanian Avesta became lost when the scholarly tradition deteriorated as Zoroastrianism became increasingly marginalized.

While the loss of the Sasanian Avesta is not disputed, the view that the extant Avesta formed as remnants of it has been challenged. Kellens for instance points out that the extant manuscripts do not appear to be fragments but are organized according to a proper liturgical structure. Likewise Stausberg has argued that the Sasanian Avesta is never called Avesta in the sources, which weakens any direct connection between the two. Instead, this view argues that a ritually oriented Avesta already existed long before the Sasanian period, in oral form, and its written tradition evolved simultaneously with that of the Sasanian Avesta.
