= Spand nask =

Zoroastrian religious text

The Spand or Spend nask was one of the Gathic nasks (volumes) of the Sasanian Avesta. The work itself is lost, but according to later descriptions it contained the details of the life of Zarathustra and is considered to be the source of later biographies.

== Sources ==
References to the Spand nask, which is lost, can be found in later Zoroastrian writings. First, the 8th book of the Denkard provides in chapter 14 a description of its content. In addition, the Rivayats, a series of exchanges from the 15th to the 17th centuries, give a short overview.

== Structure ==
The Spand nask belonged to the Gathic nasks, one of the three divisions of the Sasanian Avesta. Both the Denkard and the Rivayats agree that it was of 13th nask and according to the Rivayats it consisted of 60 sections. Edward William West estimates that it consisted of approximately 9,900 words of Avestan text, accompanied by about 20,500 words of translation and commentary in Pahlavi.

== Content ==
Based on the descriptions in later sources, it is clear that the Spand nask contained a detailed description of the life of Zarathustra. It is considered to be a major source for later texts that covered this topic. For example, it is considered to be the main source for Book 7 of the Denkard. The meeting of Zarathustra and Vohu Manah in the Wizidagiha-i Zadspram may be taken from the Spand nask. Another text is the Book of Arda Viraf, whose description of hell may have been based on the Spand nask.
