= Nikatum nask =

Zoroastrian legal text

The Nikatum nask or Nigadum nask was one of the so called legal nasks (volumes) of the Sasanian Avesta. No parts of it are known to have survived, but later references show that is covered topics connected with penal law.

== Sources ==
The nask itself is no longer extant but references are found in later Zoroastrian writings. First, the 8th book of the Denkard provides in section 8.16-8.20 a description of its content. In addition, the Rivayats, a series of exchanges from the 15th - 17th century, give a short overview on the content of the Nikatum nask.

== Structure and content ==
The Sasanian Avesta was organized into 21 nasks, i.e., volumes, which were grouped into 3 divisions; Gathic, ritual, and legal nasks. Within this scheme, the Nikatum nask belonged to the legal nasks. Edward William West estimates, that it consisted of ca. 62,600 words of Avestan text accompanied by ca. 562,900 words of commentary in Pahlavi, which would make it the longest nask overall.

According to the Denkard, the Nikatum nask consisted of 30 chapters, whereas the Rivayats name 54 chapters. Whereas not much information is provided in the Rivayats, the description in the Denkard (8.16-20) coveres the first five chapters. However, given the space dedicated to the description of the fifth chapter, it has been speculated that it actually covered all the remaining 26 chapters of the nask, meaning the description in the Denkard would be complete.

== Topics ==
According to the description in the Denkard, the Nikatum nask covered a wide range of different topics connected with penal law. The first section in Denkard 8.16, called Paykār Radestān (arbitration of disputes), covered topics of litigation and pleas of evidence. The second section in Denkard 8.17, called Zaxmestān (assault code), covered assault (zaxm) and related offenses. The third section in Denkard 8.18, called Rēšestān (wound code), covered the infliction of physical injuries and the appropriate penalties. The fourth section in Denkard 8.19, called Hamēmālestān (accuser's code), covered true and false accusations. Finally, the fifth and last section in Denkard 8.20 did not have a dedicated name. It was by far the longest and consequently covered a wide range of disparate topics.

Together with the other legal nasks, the Nikatum nask seems to reflect the legal traditions of the early Iranians during the Old Iranian period. During the later Sasanian Empire, these Avestan traditions were still an important source of legislation. This explains the long commentaries provided jointly with all the legal nasks. However, compared to the surviving literature of Sasanian law, the penal system seems to have been substanitially mitigated at that time.

== Connection to the Vaetha nask ==
The Vaetha nask is a short Avestan text, which is extant through several manuscripts dating back to the 19th century. It deals with various topics but it has a strong focus on family law, specifically the relationship between a Zoroastrian man and non-Zoroastrian woman. According to the text, it derives, in whole or in parts, from the Nikatum nask. This opinion was initially shared by Western scholars. However, later research doubted this connection. According to F. M. Kotwal for example, the text is a 19th century forgery, an assessment which was also affirmed more recently.
