= Barish nask =

Zoroastrian religious literature

The Barish nask is the eighth nask (volume) of the Sasanian Avesta. The work itself is lost and no texts in the extant Avesta can be clearly identified as having belonged to it. Its content, however, can be reconstructed to some degree from references in Book 8 of the Denkard and the Rivayats.

== Sources ==
The nask itself is no longer extant. Some information on its content are given in Book 8 of the Denkard, a 9th-10th century compendium of Zoroastrianism. In addition, the Rivayats, a series of epistles from the 15th - 17th century, give a short overview on the content of the Barish nask.

== In the Sasanian Avesta ==
The Sasanian Avesta was organized into 21 nasks, i.e., volumes, which were grouped into 3 divisions; the Gāhānīg (Gathic nasks), Hada Mānsrīg (manthras connected with the ritual), and Dādīg (legal nasks). Within this scheme, the Barish nask was part of the ritual nasks and its content has been described as concerning ethical and moral topics.

According to the Rivayats, it consisted of 60 chapters, only 12 of which having survived the alleged destruction of the Avesta by Alexander the Great. Edward William West estimates, that the Barish nask consisted of ca. 4.400 words of Avestan text accompanied by ca. 14.600 words of commentary in Pahlavi.

== In the extant Avesta ==
Owing to the short description given in the sources, a reconstruction of its content is difficult and no text in the extant Avestan has been identified by modern scholarship as having originally belonged to the Barish nask. According to James Darmesteter, some of the description from the Denkard are similar to the Mēnōy ī xrad, the Tahmuras fragments and some of the Middle Persian commentary of the Vendidad. In addition, some parts of Book 6 of the Denkard may be based on this nask.
