= Ash hills of West Azerbaijan province =

The ash hills of West Azerbaijan Province are a series of 65 man-made hills on the shores of Lake Urmia, Iran. The hills are artificial mounds of earth consisting of layers of ash and soil. Each hill rises to a height of 100 feet (30 m) or more and covers an area large enough to have formed the foundations of small villages. One hill in particular, named Degalah, is described as "three or four hundred yards long, nearly as broad, and a hundred feet high."

The source of the ashes is not clearly understood, but the mounds are clearly of human making as human artefacts are often found among the ashes. The mounds are generally believed to have been from the ashes from Zoroastrian fire temples, accumulated over centuries. However, because other fire temple sites do not exhibit such associated ash hills, some have theorized that these sites might have been associated with ritual funeral pyres, according special treatment to the ashes of the dead. Burning of the dead is forbidden in the Avesta, the sacred text of Zoroastrianism, but based on writings in the Vendidad, occurred in Iran as recently as the Parthian era (CE 224).
