= Puncta extraordinaria =

Puncta extraordinaria, or extraordinary points, refer to certain small dots in the Masoretic Text of the Hebrew Bible, where they appear alongside other, more common, traditional markings (nequddot) found in the Masoretic Text. There are fifteen places in the Masoretic Text where the puncta extraordinaria appear. Ten of the fifteen instances are in the Pentateuch. The dots may appear above or below (usually above) individual letters or even an entire word or group of words.

These points have also been referred to as cancellation dots, and their use is derived from similar practices by Greek scribes. It is commonly believed that they were intended to indicate places where there is doubt about whether the indicated words or features of their spelling are authentic. Similar dots are found in manuscripts of the Dead Sea Scrolls, where they indicated that a word was inserted in error and should not be included in any potential copies of the scroll. The existence of these dots is attested to as early as the Mishna.

The existence of the puncta extraordinaria is relevant to reconstructing the history of the Masoretic Text. Because all Masoretic manuscripts contain these points in the same places, as well as agreement in a large number of other minor details, Paul de Lagarde (1863) proposed that they were all copied from a single original manuscript. This theory, known as the Urtext theory, has met with the approval of "many scholars."

== List of puncta ==
The list below is from Romain Butin's The Ten Nequdoth of the Torah.

Involved Letters	Involved Words	Text	Verse
י last	וּבֵינֶֽיׄךָ	וַתֹּ֨אמֶר שָׂרַ֣י אֶל־אַבְרָם֮ חֲמָסִ֣י עָלֶיךָ֒ אָנֹכִ֗י נָתַ֤תִּי שִׁפְחָתִי֙ בְּחֵיקֶ֔ךָ וַתֵּ֨רֶא֙ כִּ֣י הָרָ֔תָה וָאֵקַ֖ל בְּעֵינֶ֑יהָ יִשְׁפֹּ֥ט יְהוָ֖ה בֵּינִ֥י וּבֵינֶֽיׄךָ	Genesis 16:5
all	אֵׄלָ֔ׄיׄוׄ	וַיֹּאמְר֣וּ אֵׄלָ֔ׄיׄוׄ אַיֵּ֖ה שָׂרָ֣ה אִשְׁתֶּ֑ךָ וַיֹּ֖אמֶר הִנֵּ֥ה בָאֹֽהֶל	Genesis 18:9
ק	וּבְקוּׄמָֽהּ	וַתַּשְׁקֶ֧יןָ אֶת־אֲבִיהֶ֛ן יַ֖יִן בַּלַּ֣יְלָה ה֑וּא וַתָּבֹ֤א הַבְּכִירָה֙ וַתִּשְׁכַּ֣ב אֶת־אָבִ֔יהָ וְלֹֽא־יָדַ֥ע בְּשִׁכְבָ֖הּ וּבְקוּׄמָֽהּ	Genesis 19:33
all	וַׄיִּׄשָּׁׄקֵ֑ׄהׄוּׄ	וַיָּ֨רָץ עֵשָׂ֤ו לִקְרָאתֹו֙ וַֽיְחַבְּקֵ֔הוּ וַיִּפֹּ֥ל עַל־צוארו וַׄיִּׄשָּׁׄקֵ֑ׄהׄוּׄ וַיִּבְכּֽוּ	Genesis 33:4
all	אֶׄתׄ	וַיֵּלְכ֖וּ אֶחָ֑יו לִרְעֹ֛ות אֶׄתׄ־צֹ֥אן אֲבִיהֶ֖ם בִּשְׁכֶֽם	Genesis 37:12
all	וְׄאַׄהֲׄרֹ֛ׄןׄ	כָּל־פְּקוּדֵ֨י הַלְוִיִּ֜ם אֲשֶׁר֩ פָּקַ֨ד מֹשֶׁ֧ה וְׄאַׄהֲׄרֹ֛ׄןׄ עַל־פִּ֥י יְהוָ֖ה לְמִשְׁפְּחֹתָ֑ם כָּל־זָכָר֙ מִבֶּן־חֹ֣דֶשׁ וָמַ֔עְלָה שְׁנַ֥יִם וְעֶשְׂרִ֖ים אָֽלֶף	Numbers 3:39
הׄ	רְחֹקָ֜הׄ	דַּבֵּ֛ר אֶל־בְּנֵ֥י יִשְׂרָאֵ֖ל לֵאמֹ֑ר אִ֣ישׁ אִ֣ישׁ כִּי־יִהְיֶֽה־טָמֵ֣א׀ לָנֶ֡פֶשׁ אֹו֩ בְדֶ֨רֶךְ רְחֹקָ֜הׄ לָכֶ֗ם אֹ֚ו לְדֹרֹ֣תֵיכֶ֔ם וְעָ֥שָׂה פֶ֖סַח לַיהוָֽה	Numbers 9:10
וְעִשָּׂרֹוׄן֙	וׄ	וְעִשָּׂרֹוׄן֙ עִשָּׂרֹ֔ון לַכֶּ֖בֶשׂ הָאֶחָ֑ד לְאַרְבָּעָ֥ה עָשָׂ֖ר כְּבָשִֽׂים	Numbers 29:15
all except the final ד	לָ֤ׄנׄוּׄ וּׄלְׄבָׄנֵ֨ׄיׄנׄוּ֙ׄ עַד	הַ֨נִּסְתָּרֹ֔ת לַיהוָ֖ה אֱלֹהֵ֑ינוּ וְהַנִּגְלֹ֞ת לָ֤ׄנׄוּׄ וּׄלְׄבָׄנֵ֨ׄיׄנׄוּ֙ׄ עַד־עֹולָ֔ם לַעֲשֹׂ֕ות אֶת־כָּל־דִּבְרֵ֖י הַתֹּורָ֥ה הַזֹּֽאת	Deuteronomy 29:28
all	יָׄצָ֥ׄאׄ	וַיֹּ֣אמֶר אֶל־הַמֶּ֗לֶךְ אַל־יַחֲשָׁב־לִ֣י אֲדֹנִי֮ עָוֹן֒ וְאַל־תִּזְכֹּ֗ר אֵ֚ת אֲשֶׁ֣ר הֶעֱוָ֣ה עַבְדְּךָ֔ בַּיֹּ֕ום אֲשֶׁר־יָׄצָ֥ׄאׄ אֲדֹנִֽי־הַמֶּ֖לֶךְ מִירֽוּשָׁלִָ֑ם לָשׂ֥וּם הַמֶּ֖לֶךְ אֶל־לִבֹּֽו	2 Samuel 19:20
all	הֵ֗ׄמָּׄהׄ	יֹֽצְרֵי־פֶ֤סֶל כֻּלָּם֙ תֹּ֔הוּ וַחֲמוּדֵיהֶ֖ם בַּל־יֹועִ֑ילוּ וְעֵדֵיהֶ֣ם הֵ֗ׄמָּׄהׄ בַּל־יִרְא֛וּ וּבַל־יֵדְע֖וּ לְמַ֥עַן יֵבֹֽשׁוּ	Isaiah 44:9
all	הַׄהֵׄיׄכָֽׄלׄ	מֵהָאָ֨רֶץ֙ עַד־מֵעַ֣ל הַפֶּ֔תַח הַכְּרוּבִ֥ים וְהַתִּֽמֹרִ֖ים עֲשׂוּיִ֑ם וְקִ֖יר הַׄהֵׄיׄכָֽׄלׄ	Ezekiel 41:20
all	מְׄהֻׄקְׄצָׄעֹֽׄוׄתׄ	בְּאַרְבַּ֜עַת מִקְצֹעֹ֤ות הֶֽחָצֵר֙ חֲצֵרֹ֣ות קְטֻרֹ֔ות אַרְבָּעִ֣ים אֹ֔רֶךְ וּשְׁלֹשִׁ֖ים רֹ֑חַב מִדָּ֣ה אַחַ֔ת לְאַרְבַּעְתָּ֖ם מְׄהֻׄקְׄצָׄעֹֽׄוׄתׄ	Ezekiel 46:22
all	ל֗֗וּלֵ֗֗֗א֗֗	ל֗֗וּלֵ֗֗֗א֗֗ הֶ֭אֱמַנְתִּי לִרְאֹ֥ות בְּֽטוּב־יְהוָ֗ה בְּאֶ֣רֶץ חַיִּֽים	Psalms 27:13
