= Farvardin (disambiguation) =

Farvardin is the first month of the Solar Hijri calendar.

Farvardin may also refer to:

- Nariman Farvardin, Iranian-American engineer

== See also ==
- Mah farvardin Ruz khordad, a 7th-century Persian book
