= Malkmus =

Malkmus is a surname. Notable people with the surname include:

- Bobby Malkmus (1931–2025), American baseball player and scout
- Stephen Malkmus (born 1966), American singer-songwriter and guitarist

== See also ==
- Malkus
