= Nerangestan =

Zoroastrian religious term

The Nerangestan, also known as Nērangestān or Nirangistan, is an Avestan text concerning ritual studies. It is a fragment from the seventeenth volume of the lost Sasanian Avesta and is extant through two different manuscripts.

== History ==
The Nerangestan consists of a core of ancient Avestan material, and is accompanied by a Zend commentary produced during the Sasanian Empire. Based on descriptions in the Denkard, it was part of the Husparam nask, one of the volumes of the lost Sasanian Avesta. Both in the Husparam nask , as well as in the surviving manuscripts, the Nerangestan follows the Herbedestan text. However, the two are independent texts. Whereas the vast majority of the extant Avestan text are liturgical in purpose, the Nerangestan represents the remnants of a once substantial exegetical tradition in Zoroastrianism. This exegetical tradition collapsed between the 10th and 14th century.

== Structure and content ==
In the extant manuscripts, the Nerangestan consists of three fragrads, i.e., chapters, although it may have originally comprised four fragards in the Husparam nask. The text does not have a further subdivisions but modern editions often use additional divisions to properly reference specific portions of the text. For instance, Darmesteter subdivided the three fragards of the Nerangestan into 109 paragraphs, a system which is often used by other authors as well. The extant text covers a wide range of topics relevant for the priestly performance of the rituals, like wearing the sacred shirt and girdle, gathering the barsom, handling the Haoma or reciting Avestan.

== Manuscripts ==
Both the Nerangestan and the Herbedestan text are extant through only two manuscripts. The first is an Indian manuscript, and was produced in 1727 in Pune by Dastur Hoshangji Jamaspji. It is labeled after him as either H or HJ. According to its colophons, it was copied from an earlier manuscript, written in 1471. The text in this manuscript is considered severely deteriorated. The second manuscript is an Iranian manuscript and was acquired from Herbed Tahmuras D. Anklesaria. It is consequently labeled as either T or TD. While its text is considered less corrupt, it is lacking any colophons and the last 16 folios are missing. Modern editions are typically based on both manuscripts in order to correct each other.

== Translations and editions ==
Both the H and T manuscript of the Nerangestan contain a commentary and translation into Middle Persian. These translations are considered to be very old and may have originated in the Sasanian Avesta. In 1893, Darmesteter published a translation of the Nerangestan in French. His English translation, however, was only published posthumously in 1895 and included into the second edition of his Avesta translation. In 1894, Dastur Darab Peshotan Sanjana published a facsimile of the HJ manuscript. In 1915, Bulsara published a translation from the Middle Persian text. In 1941, Waag published a translation into German. From 1992 to 2009, Kotwal and Kreyenbroek published a comprehensive critical edition of the manuscripts in four volumes, including an English translation. The three fragards of the Nerangestan were covered in volume 2, 3, and 4 of this edition.
