= Chihrdad =

Lost ancient Persian literature

The Čihrdād nask or Kitradād nask is one of the lost nasks (volumes) of the Sasanian Avesta and survives only as summaries preserved in later Zoroastrian writings. The text is said to have been a history of mankind from the beginning down to the revelation of Zarathustra, and it was an important source for later works like the Šāhnāmeh of Ferdowsi.

== Sources ==
The Čihrdād nask itself is lost but its structure and content can be reconstructed from references found in later Zoroastrian writings. The most important source is the Denkard, a 9th-10th century encyclopedia of Zoroastrianism. The 12th chapter of its 8th book provides a long description of its content. In addition, the Rivayats, a series of letters from the 15th - 17th century, discuss its content briefly.

== Structure ==
The Čihrdād nask was part of the Sasanian Avesta, the Sasanian period collection of Avestan literature. This collection consisted of 21 nasks, which were grouped into 3 divisions; Gathic, ritual, and legal nasks. Within this scheme, the Čihrdād nask belonged to the legal nasks although its content was not concerned with the law. Edward William West estimates, that it consisted of ca. 2,600 words of Avestan text accompanied by ca. 23,400 words of translation and commentary in Pahlavi, which would make it the shortest legal nask and the second shortest overall. Its grouping with the other legal nasks may have been due to a misinterpretation of the second element of its name as dād (law), whereas a derivation from *čiθrō.dāti (the establishment of the origins) is considered more likely.

== Content ==
The Čihrdād Nask is said to have contained a comprehensive account of the legendary history according to Zoroastrianism. It began with the first man Gayomard all the way to the revelation of Zarathustra. It is considered to have been an important source for the mythical history of Iran as perceived by the Sasanians. For example, the list of the Pishdadian and Kayanian rulers agrees with the order known from later Islamic writers. In addition, the nask may have contained interpretations that used the mythical history to explain and justify the social order of the Sasanian Empire.
