= Malkus =

Malkus (Avestan: mahrkūša "The destroyer") is a Daeva in Zoroastrianism responsible for an unnaturally long winter.

== In scripture ==
=== In the Bundahishn ===
According to the Bundahishn he is a descendant of the Turanian Brādarōrēš and will appear at the end of the millennium.

He is listed among other enemies in Zoroastrian tradition, like Alexander, Agrēhrat and Zahak.

=== In the Denkard ===
The Denkard places Malkus' appearance in the fifth century of Ushedar's millennium.
