= Hudenan peshobay =

The hudenan peshobay (also transliterated as hu-dēnān pēšōbāy; translated as "the Leader of those of the Good Religion"), in English the Leader of the Zoroastrians, was an office of the Zoroastrians in the Abbasid Caliphate. The word is of Zoroastrian Middle Persian origin. The holder of the office, headquartered in the Abbasid capital of Baghdad, held religious authority over the entire Zoroastrian community under the eye of the caliphate. He also engaged in inter-religious discussions, and was deemed the Zoroastrian representative at the Abbasid court.

Zoroastrianism, as attested by Avestan texts, already possessed a well-developed religious organization structure prior to the appearance of the world empires in which it endured, such as the Achaemenid Empire, Alexander's Empire, the Seleucid Empire and the Parthian Empire. Under the Sasanians, who succeeded the Parthians, Zoroastrianism closely collaborated with the reigning Sasanian Shahanshah (King of Kings), and it is probable that the religion was active in every part of the empire. With the fall of the Sasanian Empire however, the religion could no longer receive the financial and political support it traditionally enjoyed. This new change introduced challenges for religion, and thus, its organizational structure: from being the state religion, to holding, ultimately, a minor position in the early Islamic period.

The office of hudenan peshobay was created parallel to those of the Eastern-Syriac catholicos and the Babylonian Jewish exilarch—all of which originated in the Sasanian Empire, and would exist until the first half of the 11th century.

== List of hudenan peshobay ==
Known holders of the office:

- Aturfarnbag-i Farruxzatan (Ādurfarnbay, son of Farroxzād)
- Zardušt, son of Ādurfarnbay
- Juwān-ǰam, son of Šābuhr, Ašawahišt, son of Juwān-ǰam, and Ādurbād, son of Ēmēd
- Spandyār, son of Ādurbād, and Ēmēd, son of Ašawahišt
