= Herbedestan =

Zoroastrian religious term

Herbedestan (hylptst’n') is a Middle Persian term which refers to both a religious school for the training of Zoroastrian priests as well as to a text containing material for the training of such priests.

== Name ==
Herbedestan (hylptst’n') is a Middle Persian term with the meaning priestly school. Other transliaterations of Pahlavi hylptst’n' include Herpadestan, Ēhrpatastān or Ērbedestān. It is a compound term consisting of the term herbed or herpad (hylpt'), meaning priestly teacher, and the suffix stan, meaning place. While in modern Zoroastrianism, a Herbed is the lowest rank of a priest, during the Sasanian Empire, it referred to scholastic priests, which were devoted to studying and teaching the religious texts.

== Herbedestan (place) ==
During the Sasanian Empire, the term Herbedestan referred to a school, where a Herbed, i.e., a teacher-priest, offered courses in Zoroastrian theology. According to the testimony in the Zand-i Wahman yasn, such courses used to be open to students of theology as well as lay people wishing to learn more about their faith. It seems, however, that after the revolt of Mazdak, such courses were restricted by Khosrow I to students only.

== Herbedestan (text) ==
The Herbedestan is an Avestan text accompanied by a Middle Persian translation and commentary, called Zand. The Avestan parts were produced during the Avestan period, whereas the Zand evolved during the Sasanian Empire. The Herbedestan formed one of the chapters of the Husparam nask, i.e., one of the volumes of the Sasanian Avesta. Whereas most of the Husparam as well as the Sasanian Avestan was lost some time after the 10th century, the Herbedestan survived into the modern period, jointly with three other chapters from the Husparam, through only two manuscripts. Only few critical editions of the texts are available. In 1990, Humbach and Elfenbein produced an edition and a German translation. From 1992 to 2009, Kotwal and Kreyenbroek published a comprehensive edition of both the Herbedestan and Nerangestan text in four volumes. The Herbedestan was contained in volume I, which also contained a critical apparatus and an English translation.

The text of the Hebedestan deals with matters of priestly education. They are arranged in 20 chapters. Their precise content, however, has remained elusive, resulting in a number of divering translations. This is due to a number of reasons. First, the Avestan text is rather corrupt, due to a less faithful transmission. In addition, the Avestan text and its Zand often do not seem to agree. This is caused by the large time gap between the Avestan period and the Sasanian period, resulting in two very different social, economic and cultural conditions. Finally, the Zand contains a large number of jargon and technical terms, the meaning of which is not always clear.
