= Herbad =

Zoroastrian cleric role

Hērbad (also hīrbad, hērbed or ērvad) is a title given to Zoroastrian priests of minor orders.

In the present day, hērbad is the lowest rank in the Zoroastrian priesthood, and is granted following the basic navar ceremony that marks the beginning of theological training. Unlike a mobed or dastūr, a hērbad may not celebrate the yasna, the main service. He may, however, assist. A hērbad may also not officiate at a recitation of the Vendidad, which is reserved for priests of higher grade.

Amongst lay Zoroastrians, the three terms are used interchangeably. Unlike mobed but like dastūr, hērbad may be adopted as a professional title in a person's name.

== History of term ==
Middle Persian hērbad (𐭠𐭩𐭤𐭫𐭯𐭲) derives from Avestan aēϑrapa^{i}ti (𐬀𐬉𐬚𐬭𐬀𐬞𐬀𐬌𐬙𐬌), which the Avesta uses denote a priestly teacher whose students (aēϑriia) would be taught to recite the sacred texts. By the 2nd century CE, the term had come to refer to a clergyman who taught religious subjects, and the term appears to have commanded greater prestige than it does today. In the late 3rd century inscription at the Ka'ba-ye Zartosht, the high-priest Kartir refers to himself as hērbad.

There is some evidence that suggest that already by the 6th century, hērbads performed advanced theological tasks, including translations and interpretation of Avestan texts. The 10th century Denkard refers to the high-priest Tansar, who, in legend, is attributed with the collation of the Avesta, as hērbad.

Following the collapse of the Sassanid state in the 7th century, after which Zoroastrianism began to be supplanted by Islam, the increasingly impoverished Zoroastrian communities found it difficult to support a priesthood known only for their scholarship. By the 9th century, there was an active rivalry between these scholar-priests and ritual priests, with each group underbidding the other in their attempts to secure an income. For Zoroastrian laypersons, the distinction between the two groups was at best theoretical and by the 10th century, the term hērbad had lost most associations of scholarship and eventually came to refer to priests that had no theological authority. Beyond that distinction, the terms hērbad, mobad and dastūr were used interchangeably.

In the 16th century, the Rivayat epistles encouraged the Indian Zoroastrians to distinguish between priests capable of officiating at a Vendidad reading and the others. That led to the reinstatement of a hierarchy, with hērbads at the lowest rung on the ladder. Above them were the mobads, denoting priests who had completed their training. In India, the mobads have a dastur as their superior. This is effectively an administrative rank and denotes a director of a fire temple. A dastūr is also the highest religious instance for the community that worships at that temple.
