= Archetype (textual criticism) =

In textual criticism, an archetype is a text that originates a textual tradition. By using a stemmatic approach, the textual critic tries to trace the oldest surviving manuscript and show the relationship it has to its ancestors. This makes it possible to compare changes made in different traditions branching off from the archetype, and develop an edition that reconstructs the text of the archetype as closely as possible.

An archetype should not be confused with the autograph, which is the first handwritten manuscript by an author. The archetype is also commonly mistaken to be the original text, although many would argue that it is impossible to locate an original text within a tradition where there may not be surviving evidence, and because the author and editors may have constructed several drafts and editions throughout the process, from the moment of birth of the author's idea until the publication of an edition of the work. On the other hand, an archetype could be the original, in the sense that it is not a copy, but the concrete surviving, unmodified text.

== See also ==
- Exemplar (textual criticism)
- Urtext
