= Yasna i Rapithwin =

Zoroastrian religious text and ceremony

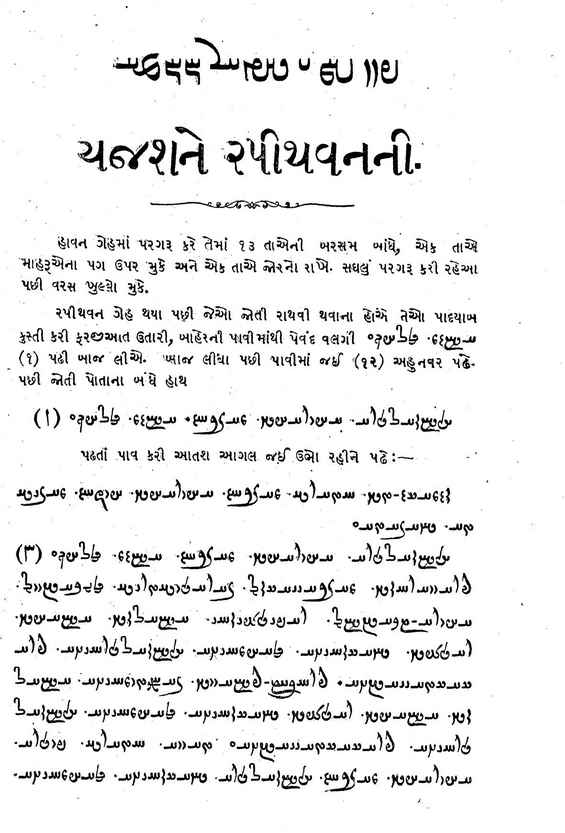
- First page of the Yasna i Rapithwin in Anklesaria's edition

Information
- Religion: Zoroastrianism
- Language: Avestan
- Chapters: 72 Haitis

The Yasna i Rapithwin is the name of an Avestan text and of a ceremony in which this text is used. Both the text and the ceremony are a simplified version of the standard Yasna.

== The liturgy ==
The Yasna i Rapithwin belongs to the so called Long Liturgies, like the Yasna or Visperad. These liturgies are characterized by a core of Old Avestan material, called the Staota Yesnya around which the other material, composed in Young Avestan, is organized. The liturgy itself can be seen as a simpler variant of the regular Yasna.

Like the other litugies, it is a vispe yazata ceremony, meaning it is dedicated to all Yazatas. However, unlike the others, it is only dedicated to the ratu Rapithwin, i.e., the Gāh of noontime. As a result, it is not a vispe ratu ceremony, i.e., it is not dedicated to all ratus.

Although, the Yasna i Rapithwin is overall a simplified version of the regular Yasna, it has 12 Ahuna Vairya manthras performed in dedication to Rapithwin, more than dedicated to Ahura Mazda or any other Yazata in the Yasna. This large number of dedications is seen as an expression of the importance of Rapithwin in the Zoroastrian liturgical system. The historical performance of the Yasna i Rapithwin is explained in the Nerangestan and described in detail by Porro, whereas the current liturgical practice has been described by Boyce.

== The text ==
The text of the Yasna i Rapithwin is largely identical to the standard Yasna, except that all verses that celebrate the Gāhs and ratus are truncated to only celebrate Rapithwin. Given the relatively minor status of the liturgy, the Yasna i Rapithwin is also only attested in a limited number of manuscripts. A comprehensive list of all manuscripts, both from the Iranian and Indian tradition are provided by Hintze. Since the text is a simplified variant of the Yasna, it has rarely been edited by modern scholars. One dedicated edition of the manuscripts was produced by Anklesaria in 1888, with the ritual instructions in Gujarati.
