= Aturfarnbag-i Farruxzatan =

9th-century Zoroastrian high-priest

Ādurfarrōbay ī Farroxzādān was a 9th-century Zoroastrian high-priest who served as the leader of the Zoroastrian community of Fars in Iran. His first name has the meaning 'The (Sacred) Fire Farrōbay', the Farrōbay fire being one of the three preeminent Ādurs of Iran. He was the son of a certain Farroxzād, and is known to have held a religious disputation in 825 at the Abbasid court with the former Zoroastrian turned Manichaean named Abāliš / Abdallāh, called "an apostate", with the former Iranian name Dēn-Ohrmazd. Ādurfarrōbay managed to win the debate and Abdallāh was removed from the Abbasid court.

Ādurfarrōbay is also known to have written the Dēnkard, an Encyclopedia about Zoroastrian beliefs and customs. He also compiled an Ēvēn-nāmag 'Book of Customs' on the tenets of the Zoroastrian religion. The fourth Book of Dēnkard is regarded as a condensed version of this work.

Ādurfarrōbay was later succeeded by his son Zardušt. He also had another son named Juvānjam, who, like his father, would later have a distinguished career. Another Zoroastrian high-priest named Ādurbād ī Emēdān would later edit the Dēnkard, putting much more information about Zoroastrian beliefs and customs. Ādurfarrōbay was also the ancestor of the prominent Zoroastrian Manušcihr ī Juvānjam, who wrote the Dādestān ī Dēnīg.

== See also ==
- Hudenan peshobay

== Sources ==
- Tafazzoli, A. (1983). "ĀDURFARNBAG Ī FARROXZĀDĀN". Encyclopaedia Iranica, Vol. I, Fasc. 5. pp. 477–478.
- Tafazzoli, A. (1982). "ABĀLIŠ". Encyclopaedia Iranica, Vol. I, Fasc. 1. p. 58.
- Boyce, Mary (2001). Zoroastrians: Their Religious Beliefs and Practices. Psychology Press. ISBN 9780415239028.
- Boyce, Mary (1968). Iranian Studies: Volume 1 Literatur, Bind 1. BRILL. ISBN 9789004008571.
- Menasce, J. de (1975). "The Zoroastrian Literature after the Muslim conquest". The Cambridge History of Iran, Volume 4: From the Arab Invasion to the Saljuqs. Cambridge: Cambridge University Press. pp. 543–566. ISBN 978-0-521-20093-6.
