= Exegesis in Zoroastrianism =

Exegesis in Zoroastrianism is principally defined as the interpretation of Avesta, the Zoroastrian religious book. The Zend, an explanation of Avesta which is written in Pahlavi language and the other old texts related to Zoroastrian exegesis have no Avestan word. The religious legal textbooks like Vendidad, Neyrangistan, Hirbodistan, Hadokht Nask and Visperad are also interpretations of Avesta.
