= Bundahishn =

Collection of Zoroastrian cosmogony and cosmology

The Bundahishn (Middle Persian: Bun-dahišn(īh), "Primal Creation") is an encyclopedic collection of beliefs about Zoroastrian cosmology written in the Book Pahlavi script. The original name of the work is not known. It is one of the most important extant witnesses to Zoroastrian literature in the Middle Persian language. Most of the chapters of the compendium date to the 8th and 9th centuries CE.

Although the Bundahishn draws on the Avesta and develops ideas alluded to in those texts, it is not itself scripture. The content reflects Zoroastrian scripture, which, in turn, reflects both ancient Zoroastrian and pre-Zoroastrian beliefs. In some cases, the text alludes to contingencies of post-7th century Islam in Iran, and in yet other cases, such as the idea that the Moon is farther than the stars.

== Structure ==
The Bundahishn survives in two recensions: an Indian and an Iranian version. The shorter version was found in India and contains only 30 chapters, and is thus known as the Lesser Bundahishn, or Indian Bundahishn. A copy of this version was brought to Europe by Abraham Anquetil-Duperron in 1762. A longer version was brought to India from Iran by T.D. Anklesaria around 1870, and is thus known as the Greater Bundahishn or Iranian Bundahishn or just Bundahishn. The greater recension (the name of which is abbreviated GBd or just Bd) is about twice as long as the lesser (abbreviated IBd). It contains 36 chapters. The Bundahisn contains characteristics that fall under the rubric of different forms of classifications, including both as an encyclopedic text and as a text similar to midrash.

The traditionally given name seems to be an adoption of the sixth word from the first sentence of the younger of the two recensions. The older of the two recensions has a different first line, and the first translation of that version adopted the name Zand-Āgāhīh, meaning "Zand-knowing", from the first two words of its first sentence.

Most of the chapters of the compendium date to the 8th and 9th centuries, roughly contemporary with the oldest portions of the Denkard, which is another significant text of the "Pahlavi" (i.e. Zoroastrian Middle Persian) collection. The later chapters are several centuries younger than the oldest ones. The oldest existing copy dates to the mid-16th century.

The two recensions derive from different manuscript traditions, and in the portions available in both sources, vary (slightly) in content. The greater recension is also the older of the two, and was dated by West to around 1540. The lesser recension dates from about 1734.

Traditionally, chapter-verse pointers are in Arabic numerals for the lesser recension, and Roman numerals for the greater recension. The two series' are not synchronous since the lesser recension was analyzed (by Duperron in 1771) before the extent of the greater recension was known. The chapter order is also different.

== Content ==
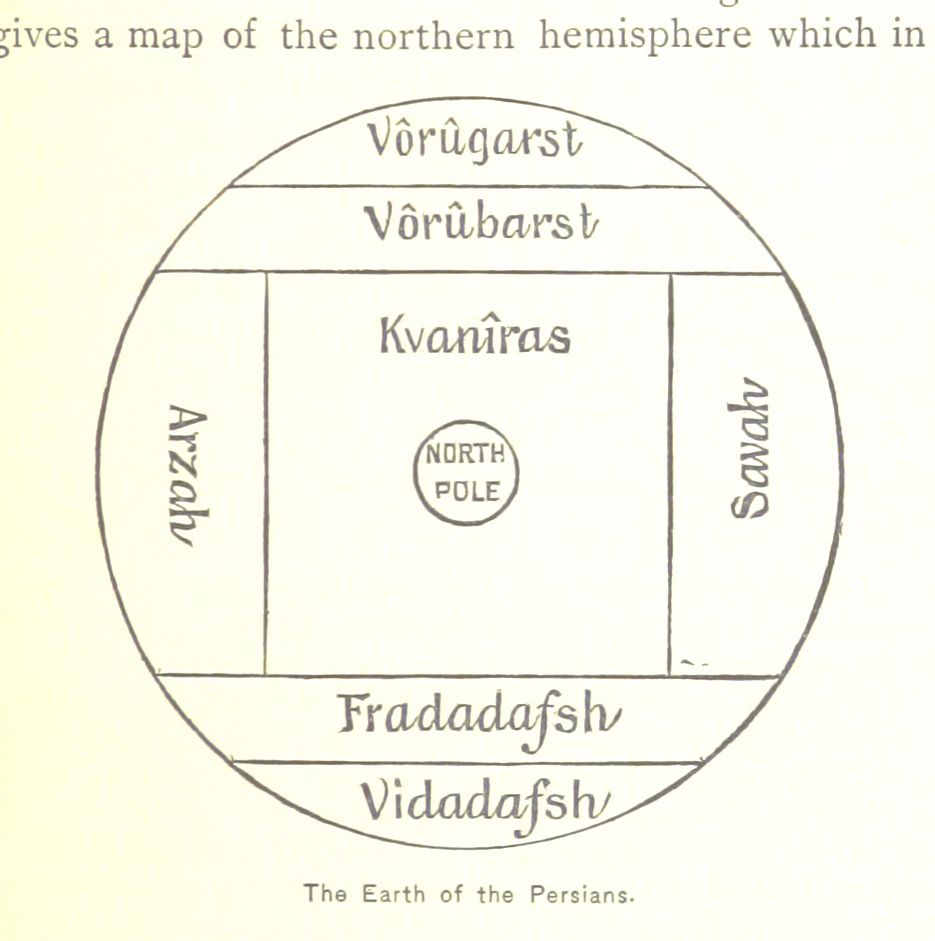
Regions depicted in chap. VIII (11) "On the nature of the lands": the Kvanîras (or Khvanîras), Savah, Arzah, Fradadafsh and Vîdadafsh, and Vôrûbarst and Vôrûgarst regions

The Bundahishn is the concise view of the Zoroastrianism's creation myth, and of the first battles of the forces of Ahura Mazda and Angra Mainyu for the hegemony of the world. According to the text, in the first 3,000 years of the cosmic year, Ahura Mazda created the Fravashis and conceived the idea of his would-be creation. He used the insensible and motionless Void as a weapon against Angra Mainyu, and at the end of that period, Angra Mainyu was forced to submission and fell into a stupor for the next 3,000 years. Taking advantage of Angra Mainyu's absence, Ahura Mazda created the Amesha Spentas (Bounteous Immortals), representing the primordial elements of the material world, and permeated his kingdom with Ard (Asha), "Truth" in order to prevent Angra Mainyu from destroying it. The Bundahishn finally recounts the creation of the primordial bovine, Ewagdad (Avestan Gavaevodata), and Keyumars (Avestan Keyumaretan), the primordial human.

Following MacKenzie, the following chapter names in quotation marks reflect the original titles. Those without quotation marks are summaries of chapters that have no title. The chapter/section numbering scheme is based on that of B.T. Anklesaria for the greater recension, and that of West for the lesser recension. The chapter numbers for the greater recension are in the first column and in Roman numerals, and the chapter numbers for the lesser recension are in the second column, and are noted in Arabic numerals and in parentheses.

I.	(1)	The primal creation of Ohrmazd and the onslaught of the Evil Spirit.
I A.	n/a	"On the material creation of the creatures."
II.	(2)	"On the fashioning forth of the lights."
III.	n/a	"On the reason for the creation of the creatures, for doing battle."
IV.	(3)	"On the running of the Adversary against the creatures."
IV A.	(4)	The death of the Sole-created Bovine.
V.	(5)	"On the opposition of the two Spirits."
V A.	n/a	"On the horoscope of the world, how it happened."
V B.	n/a	The planets.
VI.	n/a	"On the doing battle of the creations of the world against the Evil Spirit."
VI A.	(6)	"The first battle the Spirit of the Sky did with the Evil Spirit."
VI B	(7)	"The second battle the Water did."
VI C.	(8)	"The third battle the Earth did."
VI D.	(9)	"The fourth battle the Plant did."
VI E.	(10)	"The fifth battle the Sole-created Ox did."
VI F.	n/a	"The sixth battle Keyumars did."
VI G.	n/a	"The seventh battle the Fire did."
VI H.	n/a	"The 8th battle the fixed stars did."
VI I.	n/a	"The 9th battle the spiritual gods did with the Evil Spirit."
VI J.	n/a	"The 10th battle the stars unaffected by the Mixing did."
VII.	n/a	"On the form of those creations."
VIII.	(11)	"On the nature of the lands."
IX.	(12)	"On the nature of the mountains."
X.	(13)	"On the nature of the seas."
XI.	(20)	"On the nature of the rivers."
XI A.	(20)	"On particular rivers."
XI B.	(21)	The seventeen kinds of "water" (of liquid).
XI C.	(21)	The dissatisfaction of the Arang, Marv, and Helmand rivers.
XII.	(22)	"On the nature of the lakes."
XIII.	(14)	"On the nature of the 5 kinds of animal."
XIV.	(15)	"On the nature of men."
XIV A.	n/a	"On the nature of women."
XIV B.	(23)	On negroes.
XV.	(16)	"On the nature of births of all kinds."
XV A.	(16)	Other kinds of reproduction.
XVI.	(27)	"On the nature of plants."
XVI A.	(27)	On flowers.
XVII.	(24)	"On the chieftains of men and animals and every single thing."
XVII A.	n/a	On the inequality of beings.
XVIII.	(17)	"On the nature of fire."
XIX.	n/a	"On the nature of sleep."
XIX A.	n/a	The independence of earth, water, and plants from effort and rest.
XX.	n/a	On sounds.
XXI.	n/a	"On the nature of wind, cloud, and rain."
XXII.	n/a	"On the nature of the noxious creatures."
XXIII.	n/a	"On the nature of the species of wolf."
XXIV.	(18-19)	"On various things, in what manner they were created and the opposition which befell them." XXIV. A-C. (18) The Gōkarn tree, the Wās ī Paṇčāsadwarān (fish), the Tree of many seeds. XXIV. D-U. (19) The three-legged ass, the ox Haδayãš, the bird Čamroš, the bird Karšift, the bird Ašōzušt, the utility of other beasts and birds, the white falcon, the Kāskēn bird, the vulture, dogs, the fox, the weasel, the rat, the hedgehog, the beaver, the eagle, the Caspian horse, the cock.
XXV.	(25)	"On the religious year."
XXVI.	n/a	"On the great activity of the spiritual gods."
XXVII.	(28)	"On the evil-doing of Ahreman and the demons."
XXVIII.	n/a	"On the body of men as the measure of the world (microcosm)."
XXIX.	(29)	"On the chieftainship of the continents."
XXX.	n/a	"On the Činwad bridge and the souls of the departed."
XXXI.	n/a	"On particular lands of Ērānšahr, the abode of the Kays."
XXXII.	n/a	"On the abodes which the Kays made with splendor, which are called wonders and marvels."
XXXIII.	n/a	"On the afflictions which befell Ērānšahr in each millennium."
XXXIV.	(30)	"On the resurrection of the dead and the Final Body."
XXXV.	(31-32)	"On the stock and the offspring of the Kays."
XXXV A.	(33)	"The family of the Mobads."
XXXVI.	(34)	"On the years of the heroes in the time of 12,000 years."

== Zoroastrian astronomy ==
Excerpt from Chapter 2:- On the formation of the luminaries.

1. Ohrmazd produced illumination between the sky and the earth, the constellation stars and those also not of the constellations, then the moon, and afterwards the sun, as I shall relate.

2. First he produced the celestial sphere, and the constellation stars are assigned to it by him; especially these twelve whose names are Varak (the Lamb), Tora (the Bull), Do-patkar (the Two-figures or Gemini), Kalachang (the Crab), Sher (the Lion), Khushak (Virgo), Tarazhuk (the Balance), Gazdum (the Scorpion), Nimasp (the Centaur or Sagittarius), Vahik (Capricorn), Dul (the Water-pot), and Mahik (the Fish);

3. which, from their original creation, were divided into the twenty-eight subdivisions of the astronomers, of which the names are Padevar, Pesh-Parviz, Parviz, Paha, Avesar, Beshn, Rakhvad, Taraha, Avra, Nahn, Miyan, Avdem, Mashaha, Spur, Husru, Srob, Nur, Gel, Garafsha Varant, Gau, Goi, Muru, Bunda, Kahtsar, Vaht, Miyan, Kaht.

4. And all his original creations, residing in the world, are committed to them; so that when the destroyer arrives they overcome the adversary and their own persecution, and the creatures are saved from those adversities.

5. As a specimen of a warlike army, which is destined for battle, they have ordained every single constellation of those 6480 thousand small stars as assistance; and among those constellations four chieftains, appointed on the four sides, are leaders.

6. On the recommendation of those chieftains the many unnumbered stars are specially assigned to the various quarters and various places, as the united strength and appointed power of those constellations.

7. As it is said that Tishtar is the chieftain of the east, Sataves the chieftain of the west, Vanand the chieftain of the south, and Haptoring the chieftain of the north.

== Translations ==
- Domenico Agostini & Samuel Thrope (ed, trans), The Bundahišn: The Zoroastrian Book of Creation, Oxford University Press 2020
- Malandra, William W. (2024). The Bundahišn, Translated with Commentary by William W. Malandra. Washington DC: The Institute for the Study of Man, Inc. ISBN 978-0998366937.

== See also ==
- Dove Book, a medieval Russian poem sharing striking similarities with the Bundahishn.
