= Mah Farwardin Roz Khurdad =

Mah farvardin Ruz khordad is a book written in Middle Persian in the 7th century CE. It was written c. 607–608 CE, during the reign of Khosrau II.

This book described all the events which historically or mythically occurred on the sixth day of the Persian month of Farvardin.

== Sources ==
- Mīrzā-yi Nāẓir, Ibrāhīm. 1994. Rūz-i Hurmuzd māh-i farwardīn; Māh-i farwardīn, rūz-i k̲urdād: (hamrāh ba matn-i Pārsī-yi Miyāna, āwāniwīsī, wāžanāma wa yāddāšthā). Mašhad: Intišārāt-i Tarāna.

== See also ==
- Middle Persian literature
- Middle Persian
- Persian mythology
