= Shāyest nē Shāyest =

Shāyast ne-Shāyast (MP: "Proper and Improper") is an 8th/9th-century Zoroastrian Middle Persian compilation of miscellaneous laws and customs regarding sin and impurity, with other memoranda about ceremonies and religious subjects in general. The text contains about 13,500 words.

The content of this collection are of a very varied character, but sins and good works, precautions to avoid impurities, details of ceremonies and customs, the mystic signification of the Gathas, and praise of the sacred beings are the principal subjects discussed.
