= Frahang-i Oim-evak =

Frahang-i Oīm-Ēwak is an old Avestan-Middle Persian dictionary. It is named with the two first words of the dictionary: oīm in Avestan means 'one' and ēwak is its Pahlavi equivalent. It gives the Pahlavi meanings of about 880 Avestan words, either by one word or one phrase or by explaining it.
