= Urtext (biblical studies) =

Theorized original text of the Hebrew Bible

The inter-relationship between various significant ancient manuscripts of the Old Testament (some identified by their siglum). The lowermost text "(lost)" would be the urtext.

In biblical studies, the Urtext is the theorized original, uniform text of the Hebrew Bible (Tanakh), preceding both the Septuagint (LXX) and the Masoretic Text (MT). Since the 19th century there has been much scholarly work to regain this Urtext. The theory that there was an Urtext was advocated by Paul de Lagarde. Today it is disputed that there ever was such a uniform text.

== See also ==
- Documentary hypothesis
- Supplementary hypothesis
- Q source
