= Edward William West =

English engineer, orientalist, and Zoroastrian translator

Edward William West (1824–1905), usually styled E. W. West, was a scholarly English engineer, orientalist, and translator of Zoroastrian texts. He was educated at King's College London. He prepared five volumes of Pahlavi texts (the Marvels of Zoroastrianism) for Prof. Max Müller's monumental Sacred Books of the East series, published from the years 1880 to 1897.
