= Rivayats =

Medieval Zoroastrian texts

The Rivayats (also spelled as Revayats) are a series of exchanges between the Zoroastrian community in India and their co-religionists in early modern Iran. They have been ascribed the same importance of the Talmud to Judaism by Jivanji Jamshedji Modi.

The word rivayat is derived from the Arabic riwāya, meaning “narration.”

== Overview ==
The content of each Rivayat varies but they are usually queries on matters of worship, customs, rituals and observance. The issues range form the mundane, such as queries about the preparation of ink for the writing of religious documents, to important issues including conversion.

Over three centuries, twenty-two Rivayats were sent from India to Persia. The first Revayat was brought in 1478 AD by Nariman Hoshang of Broach. Hoshang was a layman, supported by Chang Asa a notable leader of the Navsari Parsi community. Hoshang spent a year in Yazd, learning Persian and supported himself by 'petty trade'. Eventually his Persian improved to the extent that he was able to question the dasturs of Iran.

After this initial Rivayat, Indian priests would gather up questions and send representatives to Iran with the questions. These Rivayats are known by the emissary who brought them back. Some Rivayats are anonymous as the person who brought them is unknown, these Rivayats are more or less incomplete.

In the 17th century the Rivayats were classified according to the subject they pertained to by Hormazdyar Framarz, Darab Hormazdyar, and Barzo Kamdin.

The Rivayats are notable as the only Modern Persian text composed in the Avestan script.

During the 18th Century the Kadmi sects in both Iran and India exchanged additional Rivayats, which culminated in the Rivayat-e Haftad va Hast (translated as the Rivayat of 78 Questions) (also known as the Ithoter Rivayat).
