= Denkard =

10th-century Zoroastrian compendium

The Dēnkard or Dēnkart (Middle Persian: 𐭣𐭩𐭭𐭪𐭠𐭫𐭲 "Acts of Religion") is a 10th-century compendium of Zoroastrian beliefs and customs during the time. The Denkard has been called an "Encyclopedia of Mazdaism" and is a valuable source of Zoroastrian literature especially during its Middle Persian iteration. The Denkard is not considered a sacred text by a majority of Zoroastrians, but is still considered worthy of study.

== Name ==
The name traditionally given to the compendium reflects a phrase from the colophons, which speaks of the kart/kard, from Avestan karda meaning "acts" (also in the sense of "chapters"), and dēn, from Avestan daena, literally "insight" or "revelation", but more commonly translated as "religion." Accordingly, dēn-kart means "religious acts" or "acts of religion." The ambiguity of -kart or -kard in the title reflects the orthography of Pahlavi writing, in which the letter ⟨t⟩ may sometimes denote /d/.

== Date and authorship ==
The individual chapters vary in age, style and authorship. Authorship of the first three books is attributed by the colophons to 9th-century priest Adurfarnbag-i Farrokhzadan, as identified in the last chapter of book 3. Of these three books, only a larger portion of the third has survived. The historian Jean de Menasce proposes that this survival was the result of transmission through other persons. The first three books were edited and in fact partially reconstructed, circa 1020, by a certain Ādurbād Ēmēdān of Baghdad, who is also the author of the remaining six books. The manuscript 'B' (ms. 'B 55', B for Bombay) that is the basis for most surviving copies and translations is dated 1659. Only fragments survive of any other copies.

The Denkard is roughly contemporary with the main texts of the Bundahishn.

== Structure and content ==
The Denkard originally contained nine books or volumes, called nasks, and the first two and part of the third have not survived. However, the Denkard itself contains summaries of nasks from other compilations, such as Chihrdad from the Avesta, which are otherwise lost.

The natural divisions of the books are as follows: Books 3-5 are devoted to rational apologetics, book 4 to moral wisdom, and books 7–9 to exegetical theology.

=== Book 3 ===
Book 3, with 420 chapters, represents almost half of the surviving texts. Jean de Menasce observes that there must have been several different authors at work, as the style and language of the collection is not uniform. The authors are however united in their polemic against the "bad religions", which they do not fail to identify by name (the prudent avoidance of any mention of Islam being an exception).

The majority of the chapters in book 3 are short, of two or three pages apiece. The topics covered in detail, though rare, frequently also identify issues for which the Zoroastrians of the period were severely criticized, such as marriage to next-of-kin (chapter 80). Although on first sight there appears to be no systematic organization of the texts in book 3, the chapter that deals with the principles of Zoroastrian cosmogony (Ch. 123) is the central theme around which the other chapters are topically arranged.

The last chapter of book 3 mentions two legends: one in which Alexander destroys a copy of the Avesta, and another in which the Greeks translate the Avesta into their own language.

=== Book 4 ===
Book 4, the shortest (and most haphazardly organized) volume in the collection, deals primarily with the arts and sciences. Texts on those topics are interspersed by chapters explaining philosophical and theological concepts such as that of the Amesha Spentas, while other chapters deal with history and the religious contributions of Achaemenid and Sassanid monarchs.

Book 4 also contains an enumeration of works from Greece and India, and "reveals foreign influence from the 3rd century onward." The last chapter of Book 4 ends with a chapter explaining the necessity for practicing good thoughts, words and deeds, and the influences these have on one's afterlife.

=== Book 5 ===
Book 5 deals specifically with queries from adherents of other faiths.

The first half of Book 5, titled the "Book of Daylamite", is addressed to a Muslim, Yaqub bin Khaled, who apparently requested information on Zoroastrianism. A large part of this section is summary of the history (from the Zoroastrian point of view) of the world up to the advent of Zoroaster and the impact of his revelations. The history is then followed by a summary of the tenets of the faith. According to Philippe Gignoux, the section "clearly nationalist and Persian in orientation, expressing the hope of a Mazdean restoration in the face of Islam and its Arab supporters."

The second half of Book 5 is a series of 33 responses to questions posed by a certain Bōxt-Mārā, a Christian. Thirteen responses address objections raised by Boxt-Mara on issues of ritual purity. The bulk of the remaining material deals with free will and the efficacy of good thoughts, words and deeds as a means to battle evil.

=== Book 6 ===
Book 6 is a compilation of andarz (a literary genre, lit: "advice", "counsel"), anecdotes and aphorisms that embody a general truth or astute observation. Most of the compositions in book 6 are short didactic sentences that deal with morality and personal ethics.

Structurally, the book is divided into sections that are distinguished from one another by their introductory formulae. In the thematic divisions identified by Shaul Shaked, the first part is devoted to religious subjects, with a stress on devotion and piety. The second and third are related to ethical principles, with the third possibly revealing Aristotelian values. The fourth part may be roughly divided into sections with each addressing a particular human quality or activity. The fifth part includes a summary of twenty-five functions or conditions of human life, organized in five categories: destiny, action, custom, substance and inheritance. The fifth part also includes an enumeration of the names of authors that may have once been the last part of the book. In its extant form the book has a sixth part that, like the first part, addresses religious subjects.

=== Book 7 ===
Book 7 deals the "legend of Zoroaster", but which extends beyond the life of the prophet. The legend of Zoroaster as it appears in the Denkard is differs slightly from similar legends (such as those presented in the contemporaneous Selections of Zadspram and the later Zardosht-nama) in that it presents the story of the prophet as an analogy of the Yasna ceremony.

The thematic and structural divisions are as follows:

1. The span of human history beginning with Kayomars, in Zoroastrian tradition identified as the first king and the first man, and ending with the Kayanid dynasty. This section of book 7 is essentially the same as that summarized in the first part of book 5, but additionally presents Zoroaster as the manifest representation of khwarrah (Avestan: kavaēm kharēno, "[divine] [royal] glory") that has accumulated during that time.
2. Zoroaster's parents and his conception.
3. Zoroaster's infancy and the vain attempts to kill him, through to Zoroaster's first communication with Ohrmuzd and the meeting with Good Thought, the Amesha Spenta Bahman (Avestan: Vohu Manah).
4. Zoroaster's revelation as received during his seven conversations with Ohrmuzd; the subsequent miracles against the daevas; the revival of the horse of Vishtasp (Avestan: Vistaspa) and the king's subsequent conversion; the vision of Zoroaster.
5. The life of Zoroaster from Vistasp's conversion up to Zoroaster's death, including his revelations on science and medicine.
6. The miracles that followed Zoroaster's death
7. The history of Persia until the Islamic conquest, with an emphasis on several historical or legendary figures.
8. Prophecies and predictions up to the end of the millennium of Zoroaster (that ends one thousand years after his birth), including the coming of the first savior and his son Ushetar.
9. The miracles of the thousand years of Ushetar until the coming of Ushetarmah.
10. The miracles of the thousand years of Ushetarmah until the coming of the Saoshyant.
11. The miracles of the fifty-seven years of the Saoshyant until the frashgird, the final renovation of the world.

=== Book 8 ===
Book 8 is a commentary on the various texts of the Avesta, or rather, on the Sassanid archetype of the Avesta. Book 8 is of particular interest to scholars of Zoroastrianism because portions of the canon have been lost and the Denkard at least makes it possible to determine which portions are missing and what those portions might have contained. The Denkard also includes an enumeration of the divisions of the Avesta, and which once served as the basis for a speculation that only one quarter of the texts had survived. In the 20th century it was determined that the Denkard's divisions also took Sassanid-era translations and commentaries into account; these were however not considered to be a part of the Avesta.

=== Book 9 ===
Book 9 is a commentary on the Gathic prayers of Yasna 27 and Yasna 54. Together, these make up Zoroastrianism's four most sacred invocations: the ahuna vairya (Y 27.13), the Ashem Vohu (Y 27.14), the yenghe hatam (Y 27.15) and the airyaman ishya (Y 54.1).
