= Zend =

Zoroastrian exegetical glosses, paraphrases, commentaries and translations

Zend or Zand (Middle Persian: 𐭦𐭭𐭣) is a Zoroastrian term for Middle Persian or Pahlavi versions and commentaries of Avestan texts. These translations were produced in the late Sasanian period.

Zand glosses and commentaries exist in several languages, including in the Avestan language itself. These Avestan language exegeses sometimes accompany the original text being commented upon, but are more often elsewhere in the canon. An example of exegesis in the Avestan language itself includes Yasna 19–21, which is a set of three Younger Avestan commentaries on the three Gathic Avestan 'high prayers' of Yasna 27. Zand also appears to have once existed in a variety of Middle Iranian languages, but of these Middle Iranian commentaries, the Middle Persian zand is the only one to survive fully, and is for this reason regarded as 'the' zand.

With the notable exception of the Yashts, almost all surviving Avestan texts have their Middle Persian zand, which in some manuscripts appear alongside (or interleaved with) the text being glossed. The practice of including non-Avestan commentaries alongside the Avestan texts led to two different misinterpretations in western scholarship of the term zand; these misunderstandings are described below. These glosses and commentaries were not intended for use as theological texts by themselves but for religious instruction of the (by then) non-Avestan-speaking public. In contrast, the Avestan language texts remained sacrosanct and continued to be recited in the Avestan language, which was considered a sacred language. The Middle Persian zand can be subdivided into two subgroups, those of the surviving Avestan texts, and those of the lost Avestan texts.

A consistent exegetical procedure is evident in manuscripts in which the original Avestan and its zand coexist. The priestly scholars first translated the Avestan as literally as possible. In a second step, the priests then translated the Avestan idiomatically. In the final step, the idiomatic translation was complemented with explanations and commentaries, often of significant length, and occasionally with different authorities being cited.

Several important works in Middle Persian contain selections from the zand of Avestan texts, also of Avestan texts which have since been lost. Through comparison of selections from lost texts and from surviving texts, it has been possible to distinguish between the translations of Avestan works and the commentaries on them, and thus to some degree reconstruct the content of some of the lost texts. Among those texts is the Bundahishn, which has Zand-Agahih ("Knowledge from the Zand") as its subtitle and is crucial to the understanding of Zoroastrian cosmogony and eschatology. Another text, the Wizidagiha, "Selections (from the Zand)", by the 9th century priest Zadspram, is a key text for understanding Sassanid-era Zoroastrian orthodoxy. The Denkard, a 9th or 10th century text, includes extensive summaries and quotations of zand texts.

== Etymology ==
The term zand is a contraction of the Avestan language word za^{i}nti (𐬰𐬀𐬌𐬥𐬙𐬌, meaning "commentary, explanation").

== Authorship ==
The authorship of the Zand is unknown.

== Date ==
The dating of the Zend is considered complicated in contemporary scholarship, especially in the light of the orality of the text and the lack of reference to it outside of Zoroastrian literature. The earliest manuscripts of the Zend date to the fourteenth century, with colophons assuring the existence of earlier manuscripts at least up to 1000 CE. For several reasons, it has been argued that the Zend was first assembled prior to the Arab conquests. These include the presence of many stylistic and linguistic characteristics that belong to the Sasanian cultural context with none belonging to the post-conquest era (and no references to Islam), as well as the use of source criticism to provide a relative dating of the text alongside other more concretely dated texts.

One study has shown that all the major authorities of the Zend flourished from the late fifth to sixth centuries CE.

== Confusions relating to the name ==
The priests' practice of including commentaries alongside the text being commented upon led to two different misunderstandings in 18th/19th century western scholarship.

=== "Zend-Avesta" ===
The first was the treatment of "Zend" and "Avesta" as synonyms and the mistaken use of "Zend-Avesta" as the name of Zoroastrian scripture. This mistake derives from a misunderstanding of the distinctions made by priests between manuscripts for scholastic use ("Avesta-with-Zand"), and manuscripts for liturgical use ("clean"). In western scholarship, the former class of manuscripts was misunderstood to be the proper name of the texts, hence the misnomer "Zend-Avesta" for the Avesta. In priestly use, however, "Zand-i-Avesta" or "Avesta-o-Zand" merely identified manuscripts that are not suitable for ritual use since they are not "clean" (sa'deh) of non-Avestan elements.

=== "Zend" as the name of a language ===
The second mistaken use of the term Zend was its use as the name of a language or script. In 1759, Anquetil-Duperron reported having been told that Zend was the name of the language of the more ancient writings. Similarly, in his third discourse, published in 1798, Sir William Jones recalls a conversation with a Hindu priest who told him that the script was called Zend, and the language Avesta. This mistake resulted from a misunderstanding of the term pazend, which actually denotes the use of the Avestan alphabet for writing certain Middle Persian texts. Rasmus Rask's seminal work, A Dissertation on the Authenticity of the Zend Language (Bombay, 1821), may have contributed to the confusion. Propagated by N. L. Westergaard's Zendavesta, or the religious books of the Zoroastrians (Copenhagen, 1852–54), by the early/mid 19th century, the confusion became too universal in Western scholarship to be easily reversed, and Zend-Avesta, although a misnomer, continued to be fashionable well into the 20th century.

== List of Zands ==
The following list of Zand texts is largely taken from Secunda 2012.

- Hērbedestān
  - A Zand on an Avestan work about the laws of priestly study
- Nērangestān
  - A Zand on an Avestan book concerning ritual
- Pahlavi Wīdēwdād
  - A Zand on an Avestan book primarily concerned with purity law
- Pahlavi Yasna
  - A Zand on an Avestan Yasna (sacrifice book)
- Zand ī Fragard ī Jud-dēw-dād ("A Commentary on the Chapters of the Widēwdād")
- Zand-i Wahman yasn
  - An apocalyptic Pahlavi text
- Zand ī Gōmēz Kardan
