= Dasatir-i-Asmani =

Zoroastrian mystic text written in an invented language

The Desatir or Dasātīr (دساتیر lit. "Ordinances"), also known as Dasātīr-e Āsmānī (دساتیر آسمانی, [dæsɒːˈtiːɾ e ʔɒːsmɒːˈniː], lit. "Heavenly Ordinances") is a Zoroastrian mystic text written in an invented language. Although purporting to be of ancient origin, it is now generally regarded as a literary forgery, most probably authored in the 16th or 17th century by Azar Kayvan, the leader of the Zoroastrian Illuminationist or Azarkeivanian sect. Its Neoplatonic ideas have been strongly influenced by the 12th-century philosopher Suhravardi, and have only a tenuous connection to mainstream Zoroastrianism.

== Content and language ==
The first part of the Desatir contains sixteen sections written in an invented language which are said to have been revealed to sixteen successive prophets, starting with Mahabad, going through Zarathustra and ending with the fifth Sasan, who was supposed to have lived at the time of Khosrau II (5th–6th centuries). At the end of each section, with the exception of the last one, there is a prophecy about the next prophet. The second part of the text consists in a Persian translation of the first part, which is attributed to the fifth Sasan, but its linguistic characteristics are typical of the 16th-17th centuries, and it is most likely written by the same author.

The invented language of the first part has been called Āsmānī zabān "heavenly language". Its grammar is largely Persian, while its vocabulary is mostly invented, although there are words that have been adapted from Persian, Hindi, Avestan, Sanskrit and Arabic.

== Publication and reception ==
The text, though likely composed in India, was first discovered in the Iranian city of Isfahan at the end of the 18th century by the Parsi Mulla Kaus of Bombay. An English translation was begun by the Bombay governor Jonathan Duncan, who died before bringing it to completion. The task was then taken up by Mulla Kaus's son Mulla Firuz, whose translation was published along with the original in 1818. An edited version of this was republished by Dhunjeebhoy J. Medhora in 1888, while at the same time a separate translation by Mirza Mohomed Hadi was serialised in the American Platonist magazine. Other manuscripts have subsequently been discovered.

Upon its publication the text stirred controversy, some scholars at the time regarding it as a genuine ancient text on par with the Avesta, others deeming it to be a forgery. The text was accepted by both the Indian and the Iranian Zoroastrian communities as genuine, and it became popular, particularly among the Qadimi faction. The text, with its monotheistic tendency that was more akin to the religious sentiments of the West, was then used by some Bombay Parsis to mount a defence of their religion against the incipient criticism from Christian missionaries like John Wilson.

== See also ==
- Azarkeivanian sect
- Balaibalan
- Dabestan-e Madaheb

== Bibliography ==
- Boyce, Mary (1979). Zoroastrians. London: Routledge. ISBN 9780710001214.
- Corbin, Henry (1987). "Āẕar Kayvān". Encyclopaedia Iranica.
- Dhalla, Manekji Nasarvanji (1938). A history of Zoroastrianism. New York: OUP.
- Mulla Firuz (1818). "Preface". Desatir, or, Sacred writings of the ancient Persian prophets : in the original tongue ... with the ancient Persian version and commentary of the fifth Sasan. Bombay: Courier press. pp. 3–13.
- Medhora, Dhunjeebhoy J. (1888). "Introduction". The desatir: Or the sacred writings of the ancient persian prophets. Bombay Education Soc. Pr. pp. i–ii.
- Mojtabai, Fath-Allah (1994). "Dasātīr". Encyclopaedia Iranica.
- Romer, John (1857). "Brief Notices of Persian, and of the language called Zend". Journal of the Asiatic Society of Bombay. 5.
- Rose, Jenny (2011). Zoroastrianism : an introduction. I.B. Tauris introductions to religion. London: I. B. Tauris. ISBN 978-1-84885-088-0.
