= Zoroastrianism in Iran =

Overview of the Zoroastrian populace in Iran

Zoroastrianism is considered to be the oldest religion still practiced in Iran. It is an Iranian religion that emerged around the 2nd millennium BCE, spread through the Iranian plateau, and eventually gained official status under the Achaemenid Empire in the 6th century BCE. It remained the Iranian state religion until the 7th century CE, when the Arab conquest of Persia resulted in the fall of the Sasanian Empire to the nascent Rashidun Caliphate. Over time, Zoroastrians became a religious minority amidst the Islamization of Iran, as due to persecution many fled east to take refuge in India. Some of Zoroastrianism's holiest sites are located in Iran, such as Yazd.

Today, Iran has the second largest Zoroastrian population in the world, behind only India and possibly the Kurdistan Region. The official Iranian census of 2011 recorded a total of 25,271 Zoroastrians in the country, but several unofficial accounts suggest higher figures.

== Background ==
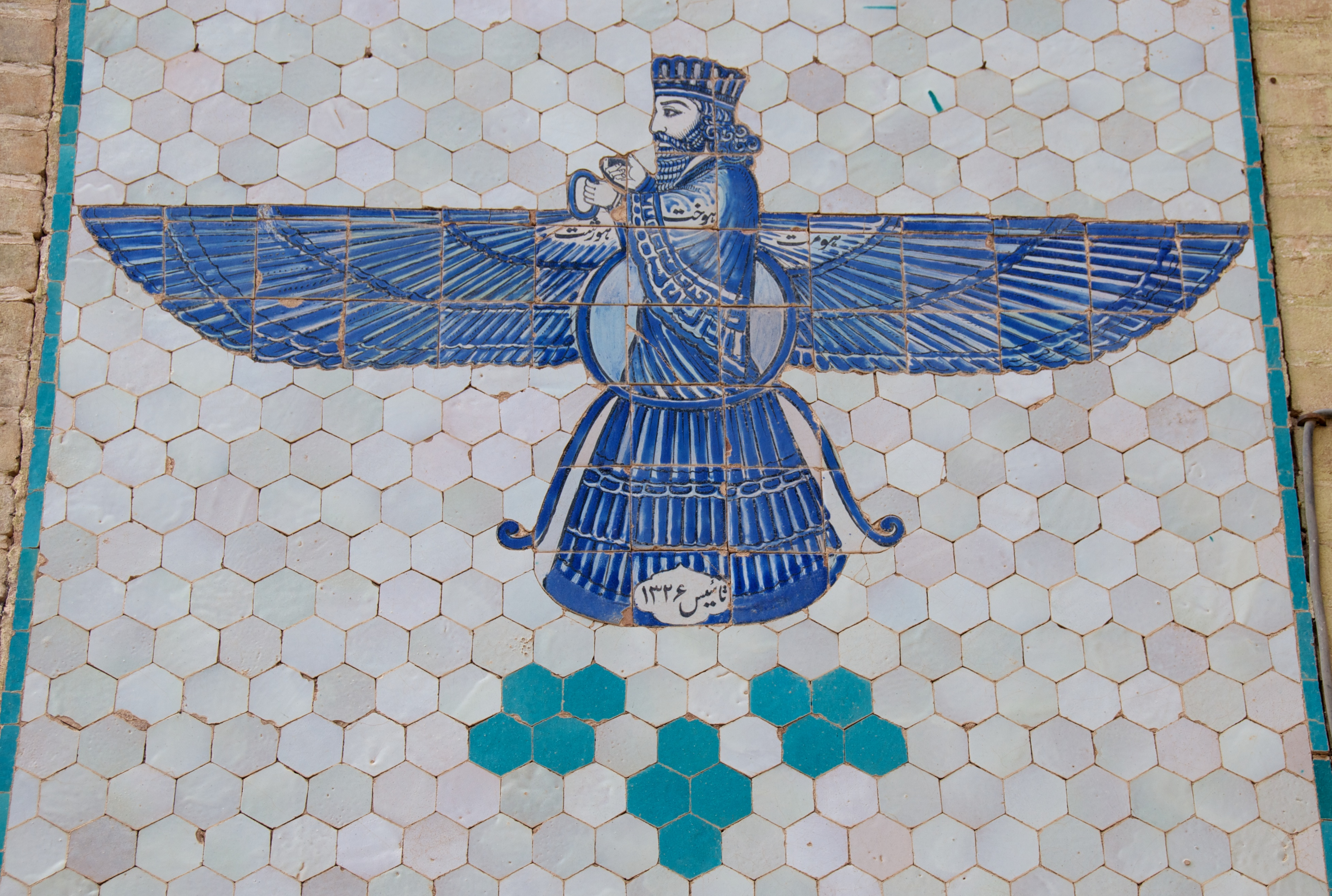
Depiction of the Zoroastrian emblem of the Fravahar (spirit of the soul) executed in glazed tile in the town of Taft, Iran

The Zoroastrian religion is supposed to have been founded around the middle of the second millennium BCE by the prophet Zoroaster, also known as Zarathushtra, for whom the religion is named. Followers of contemporary Zoroastrianism worship one God, Ahura Mazda, who is the good divine. He is accompanied by sacred beings, which are represented as individual deities as well as natural phenomena. In opposition is an embodiment of evil that seeks disorder and destruction, represented as Angra Mainyu in Avestan and as Ahriman in Middle Persian.

Belief in both a good divine and a bad divine is characteristic of a dualistic religion. Zoroastrianism can therefore be seen as a dualistic or polytheistic religion, but some modern scholars see it as the only monotheistic religion of Indo-European origin. These classifications are modern terms of scholarship, and there is no indication that the ancient Zoroastrians themselves would have understood their religion in these terms, at least not until the early Islamic period.

Zarathushtra and his first followers were Iranians who lived during the Bronze Age and Iron Age (1200–600 BCE). No written records about the religion survive from Zarathushtra's own time or from ancient Iran. The earliest surviving written references to Zarathushtra seem to be those of Greek writers. The time of the Iranian peoples' migration to Iran can be mainly estimated through Assyrian records. Herodotus (I, 101) called one of the Mede tribes Magoi, Latin Magi, a tribe known to have included many priests who served both Medes and Persians. By the time of the Median empire (est. 612 BCE), Zoroastrianism was well established in both the Pars region (later capital of Persia) as well as in the Eastern regions.

== Scholarship on Zoroastrianism in Iran ==
European academics first came into contact with Zoroastrianism in Iran during the seventeenth century, at a time when Islam was the dominant religion. European interest in Iranian culture grew as part of the academic study of the Orient. Zoroastrianism was of particular interest to academics as a surviving pre-Islamic Iranian religion, and scholars viewing it from a Christian perspective were interested in the shared characteristics of monotheistic theology and dualistic cosmology present in both religions. This intellectual exchange likely also changed Zoroastrians' ideas about their own religion, as intellectual exchange rarely occurs in isolation. These first studies set the tone for ideas about Zoroastrianism in Iran, but discussions about the origin and nature of the religion still continue in both Western and Iranian studies.

== Achaemenid period ==
Persians led by Cyrus the Great established the second Persian dynasty and the first empire, the Achaemenid Empire, by defeating the Medes in 549 BCE. As Persians expanded their empire, Zoroastrianism was introduced to Greek historians such as Hermodorus, Hermippus, Xanthos, Eudoxus, and Aristotle, each giving a different time period for the life of Zoroaster. However, they all naturally believed him to be a Persian prophet and called him "Master of the magi".

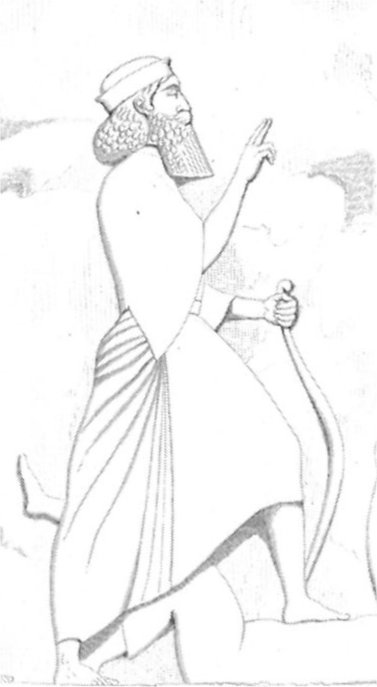
Darius the Great

There are no inscriptions left from the time of Cyrus about his religion, though the fire-altars found at Pasargadae, and his daughter Atossa being named for the queen of Vishtaspa (Zoroaster's royal patron), suggest that he indeed may have been a Zoroastrian.

It is suggested that by the time of Darius the Great (549 BCE – 485/486 BCE), the empire was Zoroastrian. This is due to one of Darius' inscriptions, which goes as follows:

"A great God is Ahuramazda, who created this earth, who created yonder sky, who created man, who created happiness for man, who made Darius king, one king over many, one lord over many."

This inscription supports the belief that the Zoroastrian religion is the oldest religion, and therefore the original religion, of Iran. However, besides Darius's words, there is a lack of evidence for these theories.

=== Persepolis and Nowruz ===
Persepolis (or Parsa) was one of the four capitals of the Achaemenid Empire, built by Darius the Great and his son Xerxes I. It was a glorious city known to the world as the "richest city under the sun". It was also the trading capital of the Near East. A main function of Persepolis was to host the ancient Zoroastrian festival of Norouz. Every year representatives from each country under Persian rule brought gifts to Persepolis to show their loyalty to the king and the empire.

== Sasanian period ==
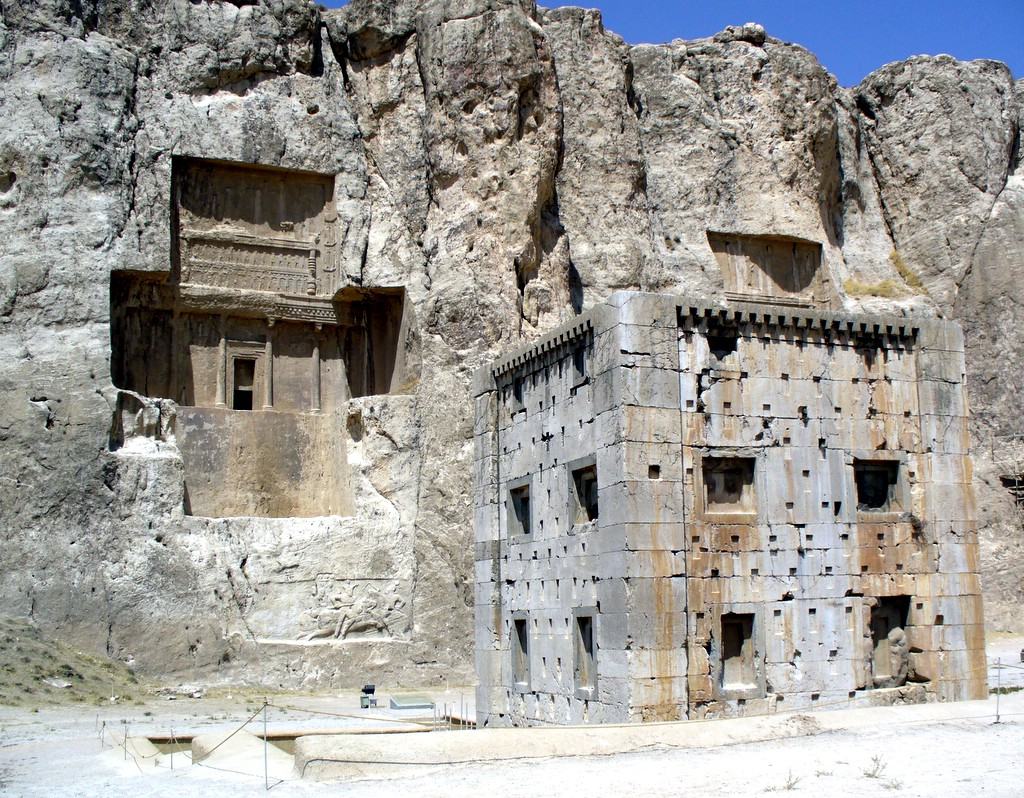
Shapur I's inscription at the Ka'ba-ye Zartosht

The Sasanian Empire (224–651) declared Zoroastrianism as the state religion and promoted a religious revival.

During their centuries-long suzerainty over the Caucasus, the Sasanians promoted Zoroastrianism there with considerable successes. The religion was prominent in the pre-Christian Caucasus, especially in what is now Azerbaijan.

Due to its ties to the Roman Empire, Persia's archrival since the time of the Parthian Empire, the Sasanians were suspicious of Christianity as the Roman state religion, occasionally persecuting it after the reign of Constantine the Great. The Sasanian authorities clashed with their subjects in Sasanian Armenia in the Battle of Avarayr in 451, making them officially break with the Roman Church.

Nonetheless the Sasanians tolerated, or even sometimes favored, Christianity in the form of the Sasanian-centered Church of the East. The acceptance of Christianity in Caucasian Iberia saw Zoroastrianism slowly but surely decline there; as late as the 5th century it was still widely practiced, almost having the status of a second established religion.

=== Emergence of Manichaeism ===
The prophet Mani was a Parthian of noble roots who established Manichaeism, a religion that contained many elements of Zoroastrianism as well as gnosticism; however, it saw the human experience of life on earth as miserable, whereas Zoroastrianism celebrated life through happiness.

Mani was received kindly by Emperor Shapur I and spent many years at his court, where he was protected during all of Shapur's reign. However, Mani wrote in Syriac, a Semitic language, and all his work had to be translated into Middle Persian by his followers, who rendered the name of Mani's supreme god as Zurwān and called him the father of Ohrmazd, which was the Middle Persian version of Ahura Mazda.

=== Zurvanite Zoroastrians ===
Although the origins of Zurvanite Zoroastrianism are unclear, it gained widespread acceptance during the Sassanid period and many of the Sassanid emperors were, at least to some extent, Zurvanites. Zurvanism enjoyed royal sanction during the Sassanid era but no traces of it remain beyond the 10th century.

Unlike Mazdean Zoroastrianism, Zurvanism considered Ahura Mazda not the transcendental Creator, but one of two equal-but-opposite divinities under the supremacy of Zurvan. The central Zurvanite belief made Ahura Mazda and Angra Mainyu (Ahriman) twin brothers who had co-existed for all time.

Non-Zoroastrian accounts of typically Zurvanite beliefs were the first traces of Zoroastrianism to reach the West, which misled European scholars to conclude that Zoroastrianism was a dualist faith.

The Zoroastrian cult of Zurvan should not be confused with Manichaeism's use of the name "Zurvan" in Middle Persian texts to represent the Manichean deity of light. Mani had himself introduced this practice (for perhaps political reasons) in his Shapurgan, which he dedicated to his patron Shapur I. For much of the rest of the Sassanid era, the Manichaens were a persecuted minority, and Mani was sentenced to death by Bahram I.

=== Sacred fires of Iran ===
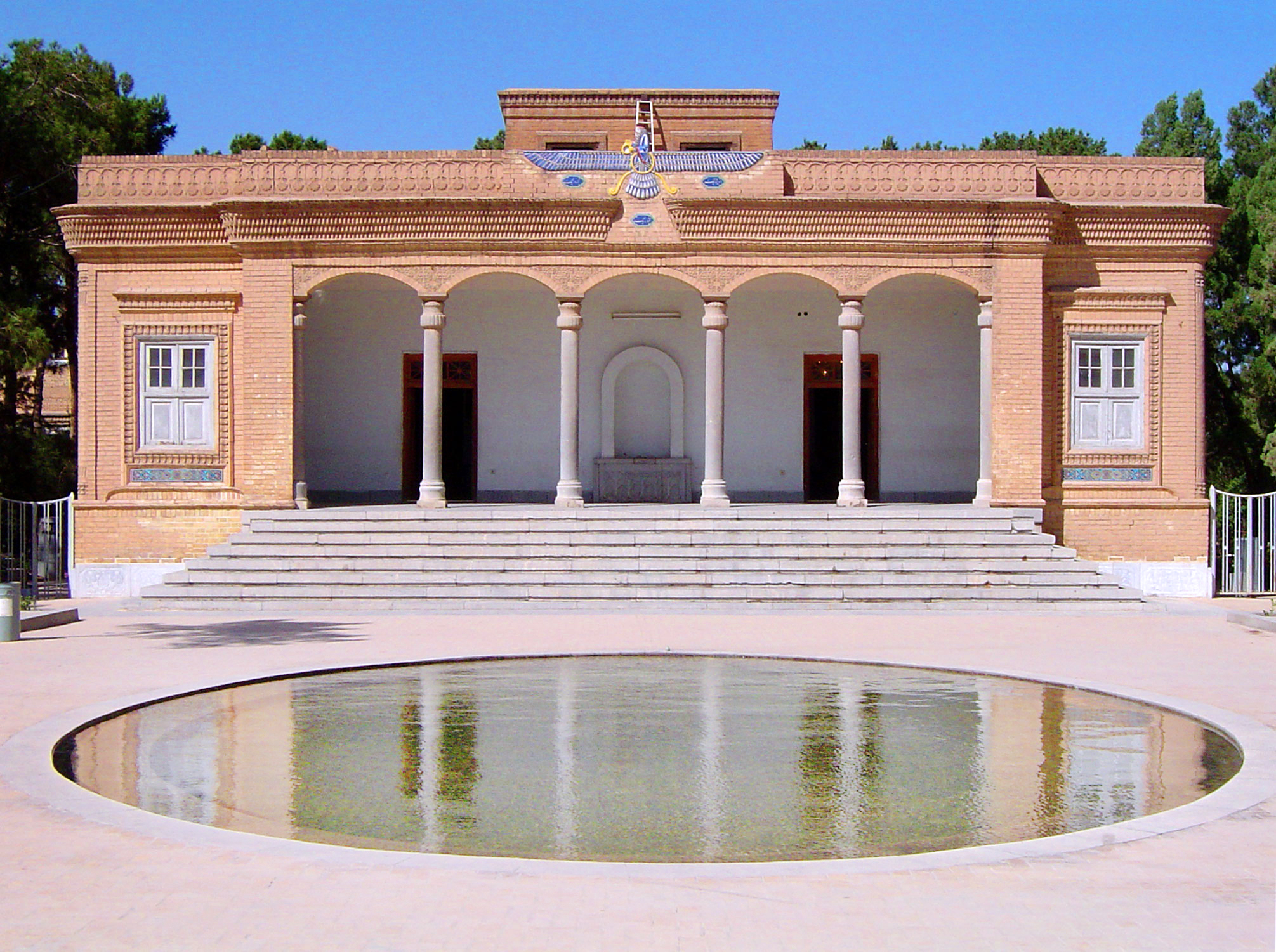
Zoroastrian Fire Temple in Yazd

The three great sacred fires of Persia at the time of the Sassanids were the Adur Farnbag, Adur Gushnasp, and Adur Burzen-Mihr, which burned in Pars, Media, and Parthia, respectively. Of these three, the Adur Burzen-Mihr was the most sacred fire as it was linked to the prophet Zarathustra himself and king Vishtaspa.

== Medieval period ==
=== Founding of Islam and Arab conquest of Persia ===
The Muslim conquest of Persia (also known as the Arab conquest of Iran) led to the end of the Sasanian Empire in 651 and the eventual decline of the Zoroastrian religion in Iran. Arabs first attacked the Sassanid territory in 633, when general Khalid ibn Walid invaded Mesopotamia (what is now Iraq), which was the political and economic center of the Sassanid state. Following the transfer of Khalid to the Roman front in the Levant, the Muslims eventually lost their holdings to Iranian counterattacks. The second invasion began in 636 under Saad ibn Abi Waqqas, when a key victory at the Battle of Qadisiyyah led to the permanent end of Sasanian control west of Iran. The Zagros mountains then became a natural barrier and border between the Rashidun Caliphate and the Sassanid Empire. Owing to continuous raids by Persians into the area, Caliph Umar ordered a full invasion of the Sasanian Iranian empire in 642, which was completed with the complete conquest of the Sasanians around 651. The quick conquest of Iran in a series of well-coordinated multi-pronged attacks directed by Caliph Umar from Medina, several thousand kilometres from the battlefields in Iran, became his greatest triumph, contributing to his reputation as a great military and political strategist.

Iranian historians have sought to defend their forebears by using Arab sources to illustrate that "contrary to the claims of some historians, Iranians, in fact, fought long and hard against the invading Arabs." By 651, most of the urban centers in Iranian lands, with the notable exception of the Caspian provinces and Transoxiana, had come under the domination of the Arab armies. Many localities in Iran staged a defense against the invaders, but in the end none was able to repulse the invasion. Even after the Arabs had subdued the country, many cities rose in rebellion, killing the Arab governor or attacking their garrisons, but reinforcements from the caliphs succeeded in putting down all these rebellions and imposing the rule of Islam. The violent subjugation of Bukhara after many uprisings is a case in point. Conversion to Islam was, however, only gradual. In the process, many acts of violence took place, Zoroastrian scriptures were burnt and many mobads executed. Once conquered politically, the Persians began to reassert themselves by maintaining Persian language and culture. Regardless, Islam was adopted by many – for political, socio-cultural, or spiritual reasons, or simply by persuasion – and became the dominant religion.

=== Mongol conquest of Persia and Mesopotamia ===
The Mongol invasion of Persia and Mesopotamia resulted in millions of deaths and ruined many cities. The early Mongol invaders were members of many faiths, so their persecution was not targeted against Zoroastrians. However, within half a century of the conquest, the leader of the Ilkhanate, Ghazan Khan, who had been raised a member of the Church of the East, converted to Islam. The subsequent conversions of members of the Ilkhanate to Islam had a detrimental effect on Zoroastrianism. By the time the Mongols were expelled, Fars province had escaped major damage and Zoroastrians had moved to the north of Pars, primarily to the regions of Yazd and Kerman, where even today the main Zoroastrian communities are found.

== Modern period ==
=== Safavid dynasty ===
The Safavid conversion of Iran to Shia Islam destroyed what was once a vibrant community of Zoroastrians. As per official policy, Safavids wanted everyone to convert to orthoprax Twelver Shi'ism and killed those who refused, including hundreds of thousands of Zoroastrians.

The majority of Zoroastrians also left for India; about 20% remained, most of whom had to migrate in the late 19th century as the Qajar dynasty imposed greater restrictions on them.

One of the Zoroastrianism sects that emerged in the Safavid state was Azarkeivanian, founded by Azar Kayvan, who was a student of Shihab al-Din Yahya ibn Habash Suhrawardi.

=== Qajar dynasty ===
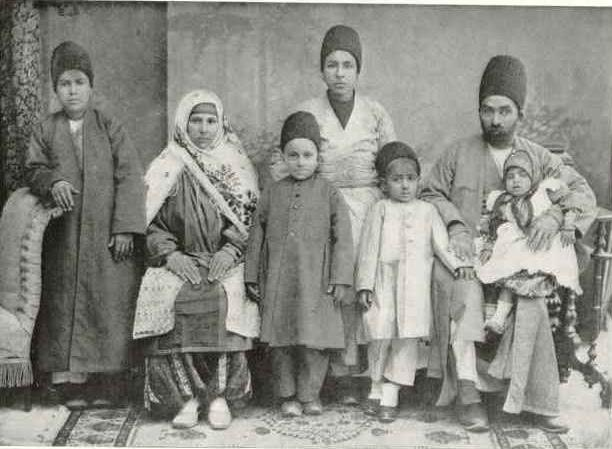
A Zoroastrian family in Iran during the Qajar dynasty, about 1910

During the Qajar dynasty, religious persecution of Zoroastrians was rampant. Due to the increasing contacts with influential Parsi philanthropists such as Maneckji Limji Hataria, many Zoroastrians left Iran for India. There, they formed the second major Indian Zoroastrian community known as the Iranis.

=== Pahlavi dynasty ===
Starting from the early twentieth century, the nation's capital of Tehran experienced rapid migrations from all Iranian minorities. The Zoroastrian population increased from about 50 merchants in 1881 to 500 by 1912.

Imperial emblem of the Pahlavi dynasty (Lion and Sun)

As a minority, Zoroastrians regularly faced discrimination over the years. In 1906, the state declared a new Constitution, which granted Zoroastrians certain fundamental individual rights. In practice, however, they still were not equal to Muslim citizens.

When the Pahlavi reign in Iran started in the 1920s, Zoroastrians started to experience more equal treatment. During this time, Iranian nationalism started to rise and Iran as a nation state was born. For this new nation state, the Pahlavis actively promoted a narrative that glorified the pre-Islamic era. The new nation-state and the people now started to view the ancient history with pride. Since Zoroastrianism is an ancient pre-Islamic religion, it was now glorified as the historic and original Iranian religion. This changed the status of Zoroastrians from one of the most persecuted minorities in Iran to a symbol of Iranian nationalism. This notion continued until the 1979 Islamic Revolution.

=== Establishment of the Islamic Republic of Iran ===
==== Rights of non-Muslim minorities ====
After the Iranian Revolution in 1979, a new Constitution of Iran was written. This new Constitution acknowledges the rights of recognized religious minorities, like the Iranian Armenians, Iranian Assyrians, and Iranian Jews; Zoroastrianism is recognized as a religion in Iran and its followers have certain rights. The Constitution states believers are free to perform their religious rites and ceremonies. Nevertheless, Zoroastrians remain barred from running for the presidency or serving as military officers.

Zoroastrians are also politically involved. Since the Persian Constitution of 1906, they are allocated one seat in the Islamic Consultative Assembly, currently being held by Behshid Barkhodar, the first female to represent religious minorities in Iran's legislative assembly. Locally, Zoroastrian politicians are also active. In 2013 for example, Sepanta Niknam was elected to the city council of Yazd and became the first Zoroastrian councillor in Iran.

==== Demographics and conversions ====
According to media reports, the number of Zoroastrians in the world as of 2023 does not exceed 200,000 people. Inter-faith marriages and low birth rates affect the growth of Iran's Zoroastrian population, which according to Iran's 2012 census results stood at 25,271, though this represented an increase of 27.5% on the 2006 population.

A June 2020 online survey found that the percentage of Iranians stating they believe in Islam had significantly decreased, with half of those surveyed indicating they had lost their religious faith. The poll, conducted by the Netherlands-based organization GAMAAN (Group for Analyzing and Measuring Attitudes in Iran), using online social media polls surveyed 50,000 Iranians, and found 7.7% identified as Zoroastrians. However, some researchers have argued that most respondents identifying as Zoroastrian were expressing religious nationalism, with The Conversation interpreting it as Iranian nationalism, growing anti-Muslim sentiment, and an alternative to Islam, rather than strict adherence or religious adherence to Zoroastrianism, though genuine religious reversions to Zoroastrianism likely do exist and are undocumented as leaving Islam is illegal in Iran.

=== Notable Iranian Zoroastrians of the 20th century ===
- Rostam Giv
- Jamshid Bahman Jamshidian, also known as Arbob Jamshid
- Farhang Mehr
- Keikhosrow Shahrokh, also known as Arbob Keikhoshrow

== See also ==
- Firooz Bahram High School
- Persians
- Religion in Iran
- Sarv-e Abarkuh
