= Bahram-e Pazhdo =

Zoroastrian poet

Bahram-e Pazhdo (Persian: بهرام پژدو, romanized: Bahrām-i Paždō, lit. 'Bahram (son) of Pazhdo') was a Zoroastrian and Persian poet of the 13th century.

Bahram-e Pazhdo's only surviving work is his Bahāriyyāt (بهاریات, lit. 'Spring'), a 330-couplet composition, in hazaj meter, that dates to 1257. The poem celebrates the spring season, the Iranian new year festival Nowruz, the prophet Zoroaster, the praise of Kings and leaders who upheld or propagated the Zoroastrian religion, the righteous deceased of that faith, as well as those who might copy his poem. According to Professor Jaleh Amuzegar, the Bahariyyat "has little literary merit and is poorly composed."

The oldest surviving copy of the Bahariyyat is in a greater collection that dates to 1653-1655. That edition of the Bahariyyat, dated 1654, covers folios 219-223 of the 512-folio codex. As of 1989, the compendium was in the custody of the Public Library in Saint Petersburg, Russia.

Bahram-e Pazhdo was the father of Zartosht Bahram, composer of the better-known Zaratosht-nama. In the son's verse adaptation of the Book of Arda Viraf and which immediately precedes the father's poem in the above-mentioned 512-folio codex, Bahram-e Pazhdo is described as a writer (dabir), as a man of letters (adib), as a priest (herbad) and astronomer, and as someone who wrote good poetry in Middle Persian and in New Persian.
