= Dave Shea =

Dave or David Shea may refer to:

- Dave Shea (sportscaster) (born c. 1950), Irish-American ice hockey sportscaster
- Dave Shea (web designer) (active from 2003), Canadian web designer and author
- David Shea (linguist) (1777–1836), Irish Orientalist and translator
