= Azarkeivanian =

Zoroastrian sect

Azarkeivanianism in Persian: ( آذرکیوانیان ) was one of the Zoroastrian sects that emerged in the Safavid Persian Empire and was founded by the philosopher Azar Kayvan, who was a student of Shihab al-Din Yahya ibn Habash Suhrawardi.

== Beliefs ==
Jivanji Jamshedji Modi deduced that the beliefs of Kayvan and his disciples were partially influenced by the Islamic mystic sect known as Sufism, the Indian spiritual practice of Yoga and the Illuminationist philosophy of Suhrawardi, but does not give an explicit description of their beliefs.

== Writings ==
=== Dasatir book ===
Dasatir-i-Asmani was the most important book of the sect and was written by Azar Kayvan, the first part is which comprises sixteen chapters each attributed to ancient Zoroastrian prophets, from Mahabad and Jī-Afrām, who supposedly predated Keyumars, to Sasan V, whom the author designated as a contemporary of the Sasanian ruler Khosrow II, the second part is a Persian translation of the first with commentary.

=== Dabestan-e Mazaheb book ===
In 1856, a Parsi named Keykosrow b. Kāvūs claimed Khosrow Esfandiyar who was son of Azar Kayvanas as the author of Dabestan-e Mazaheb.

== See also ==
- List of Zoroastrianism sects
