= Criticism of Zoroastrianism =

Critical views of the Zoroastrian religion

Criticism of Zoroastrianism has taken place over many centuries not only from the adherents of other religions but also among Zoroastrians themselves seeking to reform the faith.

== Zoroaster ==
Theodore Bar-Kunai described him as unclean, and quoted some as saying that Zoroaster was a Jew from the city of Samaria, that his name was Azrael, that he was a captive of the Assyrians, and that he was lustful towards women.

Al-Jassas, a Muslim scholar from the 9th century stated that he claimed to be a prophet and he is a liar. Ibn Adil al-Hanbali, a 13th-century Muslim scholar, while criticizing Xwedodah, stated that no one from the pagan religions except Zoroaster had ever espoused it and stated that the majority of Muslims agree that Zoroaster is a liar, meaning he is not a prophet.

In the early 19th century a Christian missionary based in British India, John Wilson, claimed that Zoroaster never had a genuine divine commission (or ever claimed such a role), never performed miracles, or uttered prophecies and that the story of his life is "a mere tissue of comparatively modern fables and fiction." Others assert that all the available Zoroastrian sources regarding Zoroaster only provide conflicting images about him, especially between earlier and later sources.Humphrey Prideaux described him as the greatest imposter

== Criticism of Avesta ==
Jean Kellens criticized the Zoroastrian tradition regarding the history of the Avesta, describing it as insufficiently documented. He pointed to historians' statements about the Magi, stating that they did not have a holy book, in addition to the fact that writing was not widespread among the Achaemenids, and the scarcity of written documents. He added that recent research has proven that the Avesta was not written during the Parthian Empire, and that the available manuscripts indicate that it was written during the Sassanian era. He pointed out that the Zoroastrian tradition regarding the composition of the Avesta dates back to its emergence as a competition with Buddhism, Manichaeism, and Christianity, which rely on their own holy books.

== Literature ==
The Dasatir-i-Asmani, while being accepted by Zoroastrian communities in Iran and India as genuine, especially by the Kadmi, it is generally believed to be a forgery.

Wilson argued that the Avesta could not be divinely inspired because much of its text was irrevocably lost or unintelligible and Martin Haug, who greatly helped the Parsis of India to defend their religion against the attacks of such Christian missionaries as Wilson, considered the Gathas to be the only texts and only authoritative scriptures that could be attributed to Zoroaster.

== Polytheism ==
John Wilson attacked the Zoroastrian reverence of the Amesha Spenta and Yazatas as a form of polytheism, although the Parsis at the time immediately refuted this allegation and insisted that he had in fact addressed the Bundahishn, a text whose relevance to their practice was remote. Critics also commonly claim that Zoroastrians are worshipers of other deities and elements of nature, such as of fire—with one prayer, the Litany to the fire (Atesh Niyaesh), stating: "I invite, I perform (the worship) of you, the Fire, O son of Ahura Mazdā together with all fires"—and Mithra. Some critics have charged Zoroastrians with being followers of dualism, who only claimed to be followers of monotheism in modern times to confront the powerful influence of Christian and Western thought which "hailed monotheism as the highest category of theology." Critics insist that the monotheistic reformist view is seen to contradict the conservative (or traditional) view of a dualistic worldview most evident in the relationship between Ahura Mazda and Angra Mainyu arguing that Zoroastrians follow a belief system influenced by henotheism. Other Western scholars such as Martin Haug, however, have dismissed the concept of theological dualism as a corruption of Zoroaster's original teachings, gradually added by later adherents of the faith. Critics add that the fact that such differing views have proliferated is a sign of the enigmatic nature of the Zoroastrian beliefs regarding the divinity.

== Intra-Zoroastrian divisions ==
Zoroastrian reformers, such as Maneckji Nusserwanji Dhalla, have argued that literary precedence should be given to the Gathas, as a source of authority and textual authenticity. They have also deplored and criticized many Zoroastrian rituals (e.g. excessive ceremonialism and focus on purity, using "bull's urine for ritual cleansing, the attendance of a dog to gaze at the corpse during funerary rites, the exposure of corpses on towers [for consumption by vultures and ravens]") and theological and cosmological doctrines as not befitting of the faith. This orthodox versus reformist controversy rages even on the internet.

Also added that the Parsi conservatives accused the Parsi reformists of trying to transform Zoroastrianism into a Protestant sect under the influence of Christianity

Divisions and tensions also exist between Iranian and Indian Zoroastrians and over such issues as the authority of a hereditary priesthood in the transmission and interpretation of the faith, ethnicity and the nature of Ahura Mazda. Historically, differences also existed between the Zoroastrian branches of Zurvanism, Mazdakism and Mazdaism.

== Religious influences on Zoroastrianism ==
Dr. Ardeshir Khorshedian, the head of the Mobidan Association of Tehran, described the idea of Saoshyant as having been developed by the Zoroastrians and that the idea that Saoshyant is the promised one came from the Jews, but with the Islamic conquest of Persia the idea became more widespread among the Zoroastrians.

Also Cyrus Niknam, a Mobad, writer and researcher of ancient Iranian culture, says that the idea of a savior is a wrong interpretation by the priests of the Sassanian era and that in reality there is no savior but rather a correct interpretation of the word Saoshyant is the useful from the sacred.

Also Cyrus Niknam denies the existence of a Chinvat bridge and considers the idea to have come from other religions in the Sassanian era and e considers it an invention of the author Book of Arda Viraf

== Who is a Zoroastrian (Zarathushti)? ==
Much like the question of who is a Jew?, Zoroastrian identity, especially whether it is adopted through birth or belief (or both), "remains a cause for tension" within the community. Reformers have criticised the orthodox refusal to accept religious converts as one reason for the communities' declining population.

== Predestination ==
Zoroastrians have been criticized by Muslim authors for their rejection of predestination. This follows a famous hadith of Muhammad in which he negatively associates the Qadariyah Islamic sect with the Magians.

== Patriarchy ==
Zoroastrianism has been criticized for the perception that it promotes a patriarchal system, expressed through such avenues as an all-male priesthood and its historical allowance of polygamy—practiced by Zoroaster himself.
