= Mahabad (prophet) =

Pre-Zoroastrian prophet

Mahabad (Persian: مهاباد Mahābād) is believed to be a pre-Zoroastrian prophet or demigod. He is also called Azar Hooshang, the Fire of Wisdom. In some traditions, he is believed to be the first human.

Section 3 of the Dabestan-e Mazaheb, a 17th-century text, is dedicated to the Yazdanians (also called the Sahi Kesh or Sipasi), who held Mahabad to be the most exalted of prophets and the progenitor of the entire human race. The Dabestan briefly outlines the Yazdanians' beliefs and describes Mahabad's code of laws, the Paiman-i Farhang (Excellent Covenant).

According to the Dasatir-i-Asmani, a text written in the 16th or 17th century by the Zoroastrian mystic Azar Kayvan, he lived in an earlier cycle of time (before Gayomard) and was the first of sixteen successive prophets. The thirteenth of these prophets was Zoroaster and the last was Sasan V, the alleged author of the Dasatir.
