= Ostanes =

Pen-name used by several pseudo-anonymous authors of Greek and Latin works of alchemy

Ostanes (from Greek Ὀστάνης), also spelled Hostanes and Osthanes, is a legendary Persian magus and alchemist. It was the pen-name used by several pseudo-anonymous authors of Greek and Latin works from Hellenistic period onwards. Together with Pseudo-Zoroaster and Pseudo-Hystaspes, Ostanes belongs to the group of pseudepigraphical "Hellenistic Magians", (Note: Les Mages hellénisés (The Hellenistic Magians) is the title of Bidez and Cumont's monumental collection of Zoroastrian pseudepigrapha.) that is, a long line of Greek and other Hellenistic writers who wrote under the name of famous "Magians". While Pseudo-Zoroaster was identified as the "inventor" of astrology, and Pseudo-Hystaspes was stereotyped as an apocalyptic prophet, Ostanes was imagined to be a master sorcerer.

== Real Ostanes? ==
Unlike "Zoroaster" and "Hystaspes", which have well attested Iranian language counterparts, for "Ostanes" there is "no evidence of a figure of a similar name in Iranian tradition." In the Encyclopædia Iranica entry for Ostanes, Morton Smith cites Justi's Namensbuch for instances of the name which refer to real persons. Smith: "Which [of these references to] Ostanes (...), if any, gave rise to the legend of the magus is uncertain."

Smith goes on to reconstruct the Old Iranian name as *(H)uštāna. The Justi entries that Smith alludes to are: Diodorus 17.5.5 and Plutarch Artax. 1.1.5 (cit. Ktesias) for Ὀστάνης as the name of one of the sons of Darius Nothos, and a mention in Arrian (An. 4.22) of a certain Αὐστάνης of Paraetakene, north-east of Bactria, who was captured by Alexander's general Krateros and then taken to India. Arrian's Αὐστάνης is Haustanes in Curtius 8.5. Ktesias names 'Άρτόστης' as the son of Darius Nothus, and Justi suggests that Plutarch confused Artostes as Ostanes.

== Pseudo-Ostanes ==
The origins of the figure of "Ostanes", or rather, who the Greeks imagined him to be, lies within the framework of "alien wisdom" that the Greeks (and later Romans) ascribed to famous foreigners, many of whom were famous to the Greeks even before being co-opted as authors of arcana. One of these names was that of (pseudo-)Zoroaster, whom the Greeks perceived to be the founder of the magi and of their magical arts. Another name was that of (pseudo-) Hystaspes, Zoroaster's patron. The third of les Mages hellénisés^{[c]} was Ostanes, imaginatively described by the 4th century BCE Hermodorus (apud Diogenes Laërtius Prooemium 2) as being a magus in the long line of magi descending from Zoroaster.

Once the magi had been associated with "magic"—Greek magikos—it was but a natural progression that the Greek's image of Zoroaster would metamorphose into a magician too. The 1st century CE Pliny the Elder names "Zoroaster" as the inventor of magic (Natural History XXX.2.3), but a "principle of the division of labor appears to have spared Zoroaster most of the responsibility for introducing the dark arts to the Greek and Roman worlds. That dubious honor went to another fabulous magus, Ostanes, to whom most of the pseudepigraphic magical literature was attributed." Thus, while "universal consensus"—so the skeptical Pliny—was that magic began with (pseudo-)Zoroaster (xxx.2.3), as far as Pliny says he could determine, "Ostanes" was the first extant writer of it (xxx.2.8).

This 'Ostanes', so Pliny states, was a Persian magus who had accompanied Xerxes in his invasion of Greece, and who had then introduced magicis, (Note: To Pliny magicis was both magical and magian; for the Roman they were one and the same.) the "most fraudulent of the arts", to that country. But the figure of Ostanes was such that Pliny felt "it necessary to supplement his history with doppelgangers"; so, not only does Ostanes appear as a contemporary of the early 5th century BCE Xerxes, but he is also contemporary with—and companion of—the late 4th century BCE Alexander. Pliny goes on to note that Ostanes's introduction of the "monstrous craft" to the Greeks gave those people not only a "lust" (aviditatem) for magic, but a downright "madness" (rabiem) for it, and many of their philosophers, such as Pythagoras, Empedocles, Democritus, and Plato traveled abroad to study it, and then returned to teach it.(xxx.2.8-10).

Pliny also transmits Ostanes's definition of magic: "As Ostanes said, there are several different kinds of it; he professes to divine (divina promittit) from water, globes, air, stars, lamps, basins and axes, and by many other methods, and besides to converse with ghosts and those in the underworld" (xxx.2.8-10). By the end of the 1st century CE, "Ostanes" is cited as an authority on alchemy, necromancy, divination, and on the mystical properties of plants and stones. Both his legend and literary output attributed to him increased with time, and by the 4th century "he had become one of the great authorities in alchemy" and "much medieval alchemical material circulated under his name."

This "authority" continued in Arabic and Persian alchemical literature, such as an Arabic treatise titled Kitab al-Fusul al-ithnay ‘ashar fi 'ilm al-hajar al-mukarram (The Book of the Twelve Chapters on the Honourable Stone).
