= Mohsin Fani =

17th century Persian historian

- محسن فانی
- Born: c. 1615; Iran (Persia)
- Other name: Mohsinfani
- Occupation: Historian

Academic work
- Era: 17th century
- Discipline: History, Religion
- Notable works: Dabistan-E-Mazahib

Mohsin Fani was a noted 17th century Persian historian from what is now Iran. Some suggest he is the author of Dabistan-E-Mazahib.

== Life and works ==
Born around 1615 in Iran, Mohsin Fani was once migrated to India, for the study of the religions there, in the time of the sixth Sikh guru, Guru Hargobind Sahib with whom he had friendly relationships. Bhai Kahn Singh Nabha gave some references to him and his (Fani's) book Dabistan-E-Mazahib to claim his point on Sikhs not following Hindu rituals in Ham Hindu Nahin.

== See also ==
- Kahn Singh Nabha
