= Zartosht Bahram-e Pazhdo =

Iranian poet

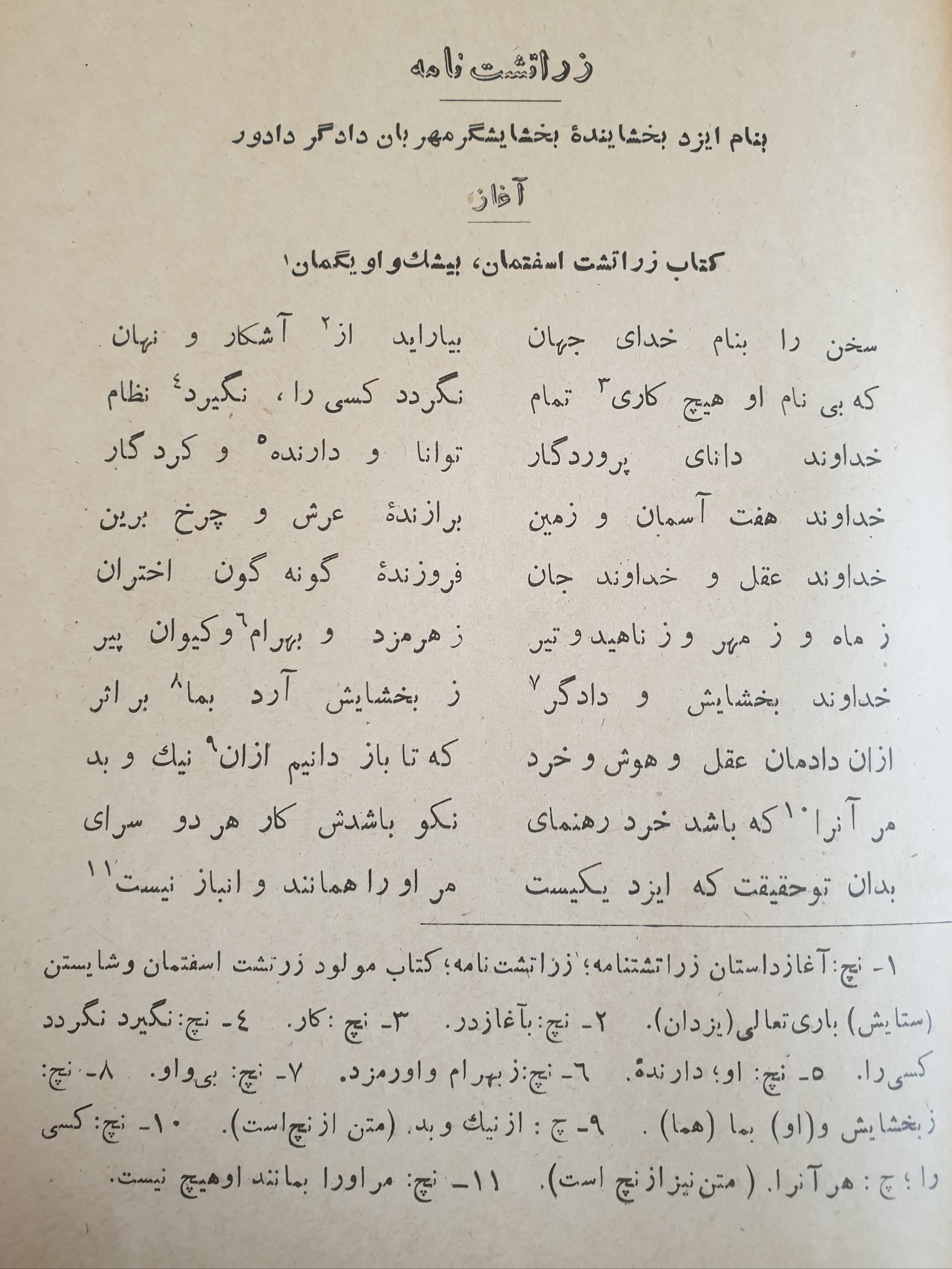
The first page of Zarātuštnāma in Persian.

Zartosht Bahram e Pazhdo (Persian: زردشت بهرام پژدو), was a significant Persian Zoroastrian poet and the son of Bahram-e-Pazhdo. He was born in the early or mid 13th century. He is the eponymous author of the Zarātoštnāma, although the work may have been written earlier by a figure named Kaykāvūs ibn Kaykhosrow.

== Life ==
Zartosht was born somewhere during the Khwarzmian Shah era and witnessed the Mongol invasion of Persia first hand. That he witnessed the Mongol era is shown by the laments over the Mongol destruction in his work the Ardaviraf Nama. He finished his Zaratusht-nama in 1278 A.D. Thus from the available sources, Zartosht Bahram was born in mid or early 13th century and was alive in the late 13th century. In the British manuscript of Zaratusht-nama held in the British museum, his birthplace has been mentioned as the city of Rayy in Persia which is now a suburb of modern Tehran in Persia. On the other hand, the Persian scholar Mohammad-Taqi Bahar has mentions the Zartosht Bahram e Pazhdo's preface in his Ardavarifnama: My name is Zartosht, my father's name is Bahram the son of Pazhdo, .. we are from the people of khwaf in the area of Bizhan Abad which was built during the time of KeyKhusraw. Thus the poets ancestors came from Khwaf in Khorasan and he must have settled in Shahr-i-Rayy, which is now a suburb of modern Tehran.

== Work ==
Two of the monumental works of Zartosht Bahram is the Zaratusht-nama (The book of Zoroaster) and the Ardiviraf-Nama (The book of Ardaviraf). Both books are composed in poetic verse.

=== Zaratusht-nama (The book of Zoroaster) ===
In the intro of this epic composed of poetry, Zaratusht Bahram writes: "I saw a work in Pahlavi (Middle Persian) letters that was in the possession of the Mobed of Mobedan (high priest of Zoroastrianism). In this book, the fate of the world, the lore of ancients, the interpretation of the Avesta, and the story of the birth of Zoroaster was written. There were not many people who had access to this important work, and the Mobed told me that since not many know this alphabet, it is important that you versify this work into (Modern) Persian poetry, so that many people may benefit from it and the pure religion may bestow its favor upon them. I became happy at the words of the Mobed and followed his command with a heart and soul full of happiness, and I felt asleep then (that night). The angel Sorush told me in a dream, when you become awake, versify the story of Zoroaster and make the soul of the prophet happy.I felt a little bit scared when I woke up, and sleep did not come to me. When dawn came, I went to the priest and asked him to tell the story. He recounted the story, and after I heard it from him, I proceeded in versifying it."

The Zaratusht-nama thus is based on old Zoroastrian literature and is uniquely written from a Zoroastrian perspective about the life and times of Zoroaster and his deeds. The Zaratusht-nama is an important literary work which contains approximately 90% pure Persian words.

==== Synopsis ====
The book starts with the praise of God and affirmation of his unity. According to the author, the most important principle, that is righteousness and rejection of falsehood is asked from God.

ز بنده نخواهد بجز راستی
پسندش نیاز کژ و کاستی

The second section of the book describes the author's reason for versifying the Zaratushtnama. The author sees a book written in Middle Persian with Middle Persian script. He brings it to the Zoroastrian Mobed Mobedan and the Mobed reads a portion of the book for him. The Mobed complains that not too many people are not aware of this script anymore, and I am afraid that this story will disappear. It is better if it is brought to the New Persian script and language.

ز دانش بیارایی این دین پاک
کنی تازه این رسم و آیین پاک

So that you may redecorate this pure religion
So that you may renew this pure way and manner

In section 3, the author has a dream where Sorush, the Zoroastrian angel visits him and encourages him in his effort. Sorush tells him:

یکی تازه کن قصه زرتشت را
به لفظ دری و بنظمش فرا

Renew the memory of Zoroaster
Versify it in the Dari (modern Persian) language

In section 4, the author retells the story from the Mobed Mobedan:

When the world was bewildered by evil, there was no teacher or guide, nor awareness of God, and the world was following the wishes of Ahiman, God through his mercy, forgave them, and wanted to deliver them towards righteousness. From the seed of Fereydun, there was a man named Purushasp, his father was named Petrasp, who was the Grandfather of Zoroaster. Zoroaster's mother was named Doghdovi and when she was five month pregnant with Zoroaster, she had a dream.

=== Arda Viraf Nama (The book of Ardaviraf) ===
The story is about Arda Viraf, a Zoroastrian priest who takes a spiritual journey into heaven and hell. The Persian poem is based on the Middle Persian Book of Arda Viraf.

== Legacy ==
Being an important Persian poet of Zoroastrian faith, Zartosht Bahram has brought down the most comprehensive biography of Zoroaster from a Zoroastrian point of view. He has also used many Middle Persian words.

== Bibliography ==
- Zartusht-i-Bahram b. Pajdu, Zaratusht-Nama (Le Livre De Zoroastre), ed. Fredric Rosenberg, St. Petersburg, Commissionnaires de l'Academie Imperiale des Sciences, 1904, p 2.
- R. Afifi (ed), Arda Viraf Nama ye Manzum e Zartusht Bahram e Pazhdo, Mashhad, 1964, pp 15–17.
- Sheffield, Daniel J. (2015). "Primary Sources: New Persian". In Stausberg, Michael; Vevaina, Yuhan Sohrab-Dinshaw (eds.). The Wiley Blackwell Companion to Zoroastrianism. Wiley-Blackwell. pp. 529–542.
