= Zaratosht-nama =

Religious epic poem in Persian language

Zaratosht-nama (Persian: زراتشت‌نامه, romanized: Zarātušt-nāma) or Changranghacha-nama is a religious epic poem in Persian language composed in 13th century CE. The poem is about the life of Zoroaster, the founder of Zoroastrianism. The author of the poem is Kay Kāwōs pūr-i Xusraw. The poem is erroneously attributed to Zartosht Bahram-e Pazhdo, who is actually the copier of the first surviving manuscript of the work. The poem contains 600 distichs and is composed in the same meter as Shahnameh of Ferdowsi. The work is based on the oral narratives of Zoroastrians and has a lot of similarities with Middle Persian literature such as the Denkard. Arabic loanwords are not common in the work. It also contains some rare Pahlavi words.

== Reflection of Zoroastrian Thought in Persian Poetry ==
Zaratosht-nama is one of the ancient Persian epics that narrates the life story of Zoroaster, the prophet of the Zoroastrian faith. The poet in this epic narrates the life of zoroaster through his dialogues and debates with priests and sages. One of the essential and well-known sections is Zoroaster's debate with an Indian priest (here, a Brahmin) named Changranghach, who converted to the Zoroastrian faith after hearing his words and hearing him recite the Avesta.

The Zaratosht-nama is composed in the hazaj meter, and its vocabulary has largely remained free of Arabic influence. Instead, many Pahlavi and Middle Persian words are used in the poem, which gives the work a distinctive linguistic authenticity and value. Researchers believe that the poet of this epic drew inspiration from oral traditions and ancient Zoroastrian sources. However, no Middle Persian text has yet been discovered that corresponds precisely to it.

This poem is one of the few Persian works devoted to the life of a prophet, creating a beautiful and lasting connection between Persian poetry of the Islamic era and the intellectual and religious heritage of ancient Iran.
