= Jamshid Bahman Jamshidian =

Iranian politician and banker

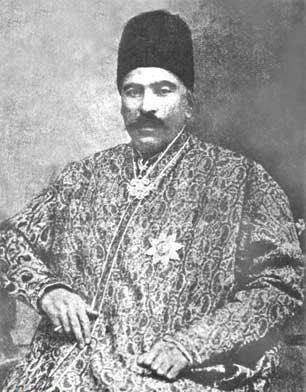
Jamshid Bahman Jamshidian, 1903

Jamshid Bahman Jamshidian, also known as Arbab Jamshidi (1851 in Yazd – January 16, 1933 in Tehran), was a prominent Zoroastrian figure in Iran who introduced the idea of modern banking in Iran as well as being the first representative of the Zoroastrian community in the Iranian Parliament.

== Life ==
At the age of 11, due to his intelligence and exceptionally sharp memory, he was sent to Borujerd along with one of his father's friends, to work in the local trade center owned by Arbab Rostam Mehr. He stayed there until the age of 20. By that time, the young Jamshid had opened his own small trade centers in Borujerd and Bandar Abbas and he was focusing on the clothing business. He expanded his operations to the north and specifically towards the capital, Tehran. One of his early intentions, deeply rooted in the care that he had for his society and his fellow Zoroastrians, was to employ as many bright young Zoroastrians as possible in his business, to reduce the centuries-old dependency of their society on traditional farming.

Arbab Jamshid encouraged and facilitated Zoroastrian migration to the capital of Tehran. At the height of his operation, he had 150 Zoroastrian employees in his Tehran financial firm. Zoroastrian neighborhoods were formed in the area surrounding the residence of Jamshid. The nucleus of this community was formed by his employees and their families, joined later by other Zoroastrians.

By the age of 35, Arbab Jamshid had several trade chambers in the central market known as the Grand Bazaar of Tehran. This was a place where, normally non-Moslems had difficult times establishing businesses due to heightened level of prejudice. It was deeply rooted in centuries of discrimination and unjust behavior. Jamshid managed to build respect by establishing relationships with the key political figures of his time. These included two kings of Iran, Mozaffar ad-Din Shah Qajar and Mohammed Ali Shah Qajar, and other political figures such as the first Iranian Prime Minister Mirza Nasrullah Khan. These relationships were built upon mutual respect and often accompanied by generous gifts.

While keeping these powerful relationships, he also helped the poor. Iranians from any religious belief and/or background would be welcomed on a weekly basis to his house or business centers. Often 400 to 500 of the poor attended his weekly lunch. Arbab Jamshid was known as the Hatim al-Tai of Iran.

== See also ==
- Bank Melli Iran
- Zoroastrians in Iran
