= Azar Kayvan =

Persian philosopher and priest

- آذر کیوان
- Born: between 1529 and 1533; Istakhr, Safavid Iran
- Died: between 1609 and 1618; Patna, Mughal Empire
- Other name: Zu'l-'Olum (master of the sciences)
- Parent(s): Azar Zerdusht (father); Shirin (mother)
- Religion: Zoroastrianism

Āzar Kayvān (Note: The first name sometimes transcribed Adhar; the surname is sometimes transcribed Kaiwan.) (b. between c. 1529 and 1533; d. between c. 1609 and 1618) was the Zoroastrian high priest of Istakhr and a gnostic philosopher, who was a native of Fars, Iran and later emigrated to Patna in the Mughal Empire during the reign of Emperor Akbar. A member of the Sepāsīān community (gorūh), he became the founder of a Zoroastrian school of Ishraqiyyun or Illuminationists, which exhibited features of Sufi Muslim influence. This school became known as the Kis-e-Abadi "Abadi sect" or Azarkeivanian.

== Biography ==
Details regarding Azar Kayvan's life are scant and are mainly derived from the hagiographical literature of the Abadi sect. This hagiography places Azar Kayvan, son of Azar Gashasb, and his ancestry back to Sasan V (Note: cf. the Dasatir-i-Asmani.) then through Sasan to the Kayanian dynasty, Keyumars, and finally to Mahābād, the primordial figure who appeared at the very beginning of the great cycle of prophecy, according to the Dasatir-i-Asmani, and who seems to be none other than Adam. His mother was named Shirin; her ancestry goes back to Philosopher King Khosrow I.

According to the Dabestan-e Mazaheb, Azar Kayvan showed signs of his calling to the contemplative life as a young boy. Through dreams and visions he received the teaching of the ancient sages of Iran, which allowed him to give extraordinary replies to questions which were asked of him at the madrasa where he was a student, and which won him the nickname ḏū l-ʿulūm "master of the sciences". Internal references in the biography by his devotees allow us to determine that his residence was at Itakhr (about a hundred kilometers north of Shiraz), where he spent the first thirty or forty years of his life in contemplation and where he assembled his first assembly of disciples. Around 1570, drawn by the religious revival which was taking place in India around the Emperor Akbar, he left with them to settle down in the town of Patna in Bihar, where he lived until he died at around eighty-five years of age.

== Students and influence ==
Amongst his students, certain of these hagiographical sources place key Twelver Shi'a theosophical figures of the Safavid philosophical revival at Isfahan within his circle. Notably among these figures was Baha' al-Din al-'Amili and Mir Fendereski, on whose behest the latter seems to have translated the Yoga Vasistha from Sanskrit into Persian.

Azar Keyvan had tendency towards the philosophical school of Shihab al-Din Yahya ibn Habash Suhrawardi, another Persian philosopher of 12th century. He was regarded by his followers to be the reviver of Illuminationism (Illuminationist Philosophy) within the context of Zoroastrianism.

According to one school of thought, Dastur Meherji Rana, who had influenced Akbar and founded the famous lineage of Parsi high priests at Navsari, was a disciple of Azar Kayvan.

== See also ==
- Dabestan-e Mazaheb, whose author was a son of Azar Kayvan according to some scholars.
