= David Shea (linguist) =

Irish linguist

David Shea (1777–1836) was an Irish orientalist and translator.

== Life ==
The son of Daniel Shea, a farmer, he was born in County Limerick. He entered Trinity College, Dublin on 3 June 1793, and in 1797 obtained a scholarship in classics. Several of his friends belonged to the Society of United Irishmen. In April 1798 John FitzGibbon, 1st Earl of Clare, vice-chancellor of the university, held a visitation, at which he required students to take an oath that they would inform against anybody whom they knew to be connected with the society. Shea, refusing to comply, was expelled from the university.

Shea came to England and found a mastership in a private school. His knowledge of Italian gained him the post of chief clerk in a large mercantile establishment at Malta. While there he mastered Arabic, acquiring a knowledge not only of the classical language, but also of current dialects. A project on the part of his employers to open a factory on the east coast of the Black Sea induced him to study Persian also. But the firm being compelled to withdraw from the Levant altogether, he was recalled to England.

Shea made the acquaintance of Adam Clarke, who found him employment as a private tutor in the house of Dr. Laurell, and afterwards by his interest procured him an assistant professorship in the oriental department of the East India Company's Haileybury College. On the institution of the Oriental Translation Fund, Shea was made a member of committee, and started by translating Mirkhond's ‘History of the Early Kings of Persia,’ which was published in London in 1832. He moved on to the translation of the Dabistán. Before finishing however, he died at Haileybury College on 11 May 1836. The translation of the Dabistán was completed by Anthony Troyer, and published in Paris in 1843, and in London in 1844.
