= Dabestan-e Mazaheb =

17th century work examining and comparing South Asian and Middle Eastern religions

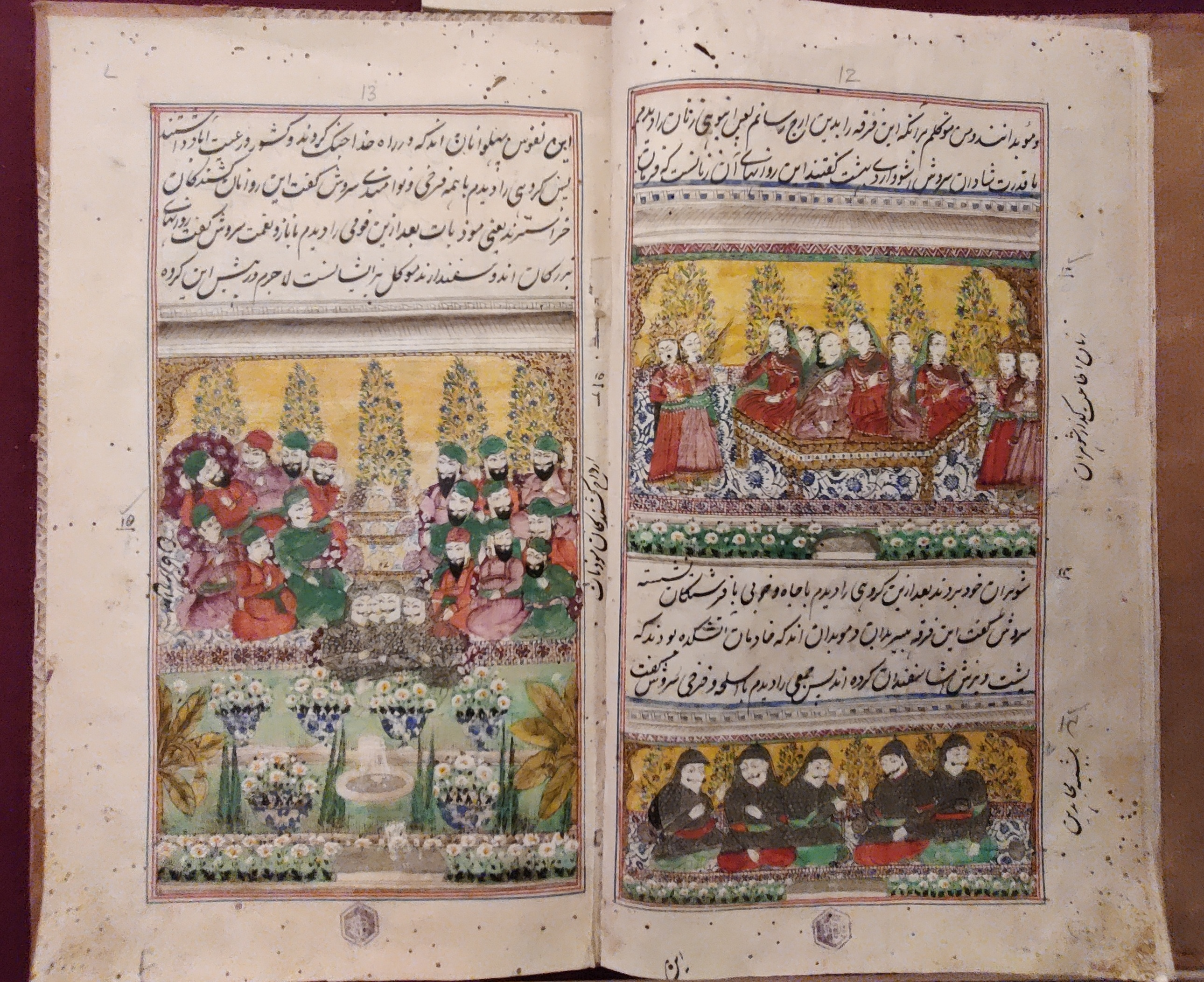
- An 1875 reproduction of the Dabestan-e Mazaheb at the Salar Jung Museum, Hyderabad
- Author: Mir Du'lfiqar Ardestani
- Language: Persian
- Subject: Comparative religion
- Published: 1645 – 1658
- Publication place: Mughal India

The Dabestan-e Mazaheb (Persian: دبستان مذاهب; lit. 'school of religions') is a Persian language work on Comparative religion, written between 1645 and 1658, that examines and compares Abrahamic, Dharmic and other religions of the mid-17th century South Asia and the Middle East. Additionally, it has information on various Hellenic philosophical traditions, such as Aristotelianism and Neoplatonism. The work, composed in the mid-17th century, is of uncertain authorship. The text's title is also transliterated as Dabistān-i Mazāhib, Dabistan-e Madahib, or Dabestan-e Madaheb.

The text is best known for its dedication of an entire chapter to Din-i Ilahi, the syncretic religion propounded by the Mughal emperor Jalāl ud-Dīn Muḥammad Akbar after 1581 and is possibly the most reliable account of the Ibādat Khāna discussions that led up to this. It is also one of the first works in history to make any mention of Sikhism.

== Authorship ==
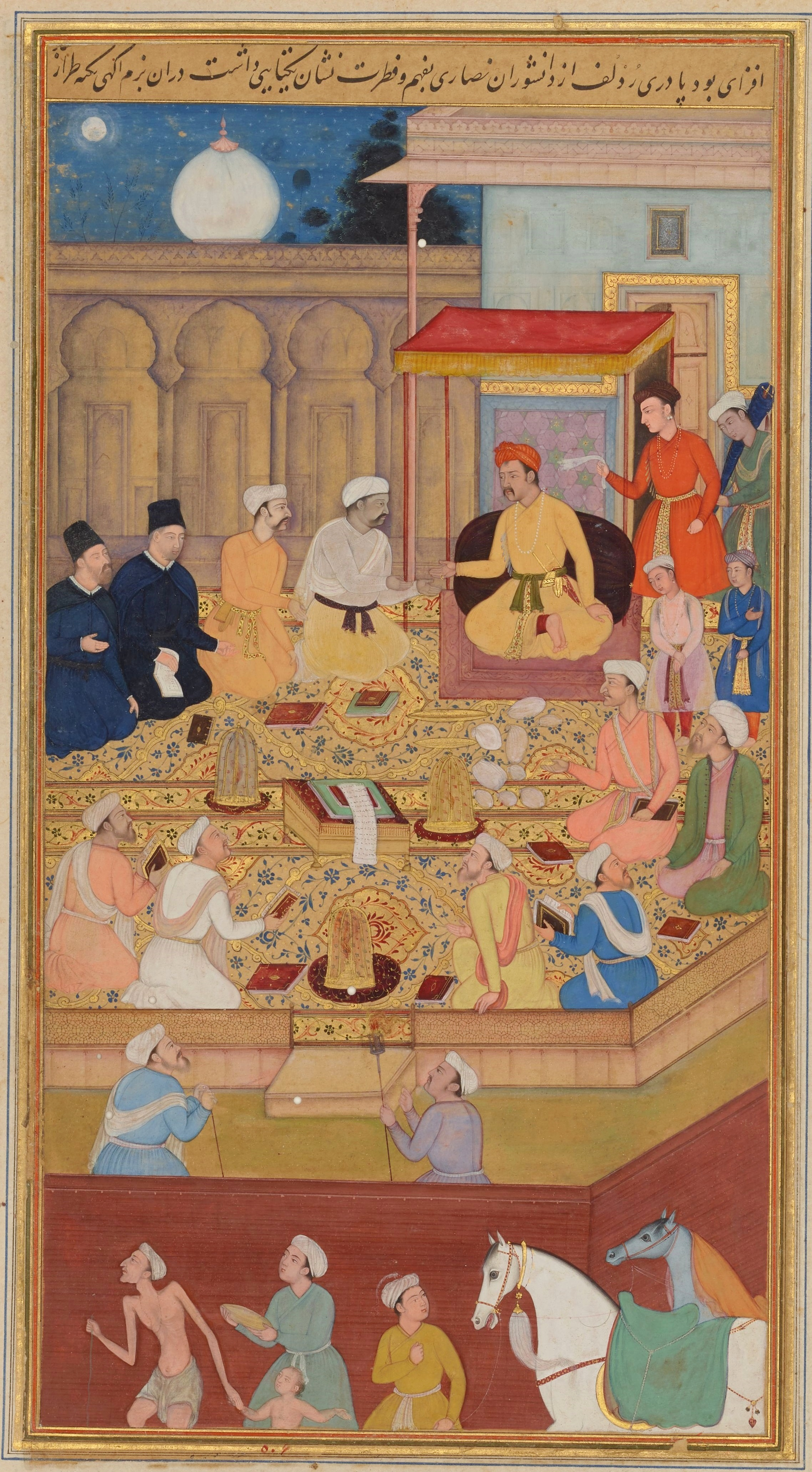
Mughal Emperor Akbar (c. 1556–1605) holds interfaith dialogue in the Ibadat Khana (House of Worship) in Fatehpur Sikri; the two men dressed in black are the Jesuit missionaries Rodolfo Acquaviva and Francisco Henriques. Illustration to the Akbarnama, miniature painting by Nar Singh, c. 1605.

Several manuscripts have been discovered that identify the author as Mīr Du'lfiqar Ardestānī (also known as Mollah Mowbad). Mir Du'lfiqar is now generally accepted as the author of this work.

Before these manuscripts were discovered, however, Sir William Jones identified the author as Mohsin Fani Kashmiri. In 1856, a Parsi named Keykosrow b. Kāvūs claimed Khosrow Esfandiyar as the author, who was a son of Azar Kayvan. Louis E. Fenech identifies the author of the work as Mobad Shah.

== Editions ==
This work was first printed by Nazar Ashraf in a very accurate edition in movable type at Calcutta in 1809 (an offset reprint of this edition was published by Ali Asghar Mustafawi from Teheran in 1982). A lithographed edition was published by Ibrahim bin Nur Muhammad from Bombay in AH 1292 (1875). In 1877, Munshi Nawal Kishore published another Lithographed edition from Lucknow. The distinguished Persian scholar Francis Gladwin translated the chapter on the Persians into English and published it from Calcutta in 1789. A German version by E. Dalburg from Wurzburg was published in 1809. The section on the Roshani movement was translated into English by J. Leyden for the Asiatic Researches, xi, Calcutta and the entire work was translated into English by David Shea and Anthony Troyer under the title, The Dabestan, or School of Manners (1843) in three volumes from London.

The author describes that he spent time in Patna, Kashmir, Lahore, Surat and Srikakulam (Andhra Pradesh). He is perceived to have been a person of great scholarship and curiosity, and extremely open-minded for the context of his time. He mentions numerous interviews with scholars of numerous faiths, which suggests that he was well connected, and so qualified to report on the Din-i Ilahi.

According to The Jew in the Lotus by Rodger Kamenetz, a Dabestan was commissioned by a Mughal prince, Dara Shikoh. The section on Judaism consists of translations by a Persian Jew, Sarmad Kashani, and his Hindu disciple from Sindh. Walter Fischel notes:

Through the medium of the Dabestan Sarmad thus became the channel through which Jewish ideas, though with a Sufic blending, penetrated into the religious fabric of the India of his time.

An English version of the Dabestan by David Shea (1843) is available at the Digital Library of India IISc.

== Religions included ==
The work has information regarding several religions and their sects, over a course of twelve chapters. The religions and their sects included in Dabestan-e Mazaheb are as follows:

- Iranian folk religion
  - Sipasiyya
  - Jemshaspiyya
  - Samradiyya
  - Khodaniyya
  - Radiyya
  - Shidrangiyya
  - Pykeriyya
  - Milaniyya
  - Alariyya
  - Shidabiyya
  - Akhshiyya
  - Zoroastrianism (Note: Dabestan-e Mazaheb does indeed list Zoroastrianism and Mazdakism under folk religion of the Persian[s], and Jainism, Sikhism along with the Madariyya, Jelali, and Kaka’i sects under Hinduism.)
  - Mazdakism
- Hinduism
  - Vaishnavism
  - Shaivism
  - Shaktism
  - Smartism
  - Charvakism
  - Jainism
  - Sikhism
  - Madariyya
  - Jelali
  - Kaka’i
  - Bhakti
- Buddhism
  - Tibetan Buddhism
- Judaism
  - Orthodox Judaism
  - Kashani, the followers of Sarmad Kashani
  - Chala
- Christianity
- Islam
  - Sunni
  - Shia
  - Akbari
  - Ali-Illahi
  - Roshani
- Sadakiyya, a religion founded by Musaylima
- Wahidiyya, a central Asian religion founded by Wahid Mahmud
- Din-i Ilahi
