= Hermodorus =

Hermodorus (Greek: Ἑρμόδωρος), an Ephesian who lived in the 4th century BC, was an original member of Plato's Academy and was present at the death of Socrates. He is said to have circulated the works of Plato (combined Socratic tenets with the Eleaticism of Parmenides), and to have sold them in Sicily. Hermodorus himself appears to have been a philosopher, for we know the titles of two works that were attributed to him: On Plato (Greek: Περὶ Πλάτωνος), and On Mathematics (Greek: Περὶ μαθημάτων).

A.E. Taylor says:

Hermodorus, an original member of Plato's Academy, stated that for the moment the friends of Socrates felt themselves in danger just after his death, and that Plato in particular, with others, withdrew for a while to the neighbouring city of Megara under the protection of Euclides of that city, a philosopher who was among the foreign friends present at the death of Socrates and combined certain Socratic tenets with the Eleaticism of Parmenides.
