= Zoroaster =

Iranian prophet and spiritual founder of Zoroastrianism

Artu Zarathushtra Spitama
- 𐬰𐬀𐬭𐬀𐬚𐬎𐬱𐬙𐬭𐬀 𐬯𐬞𐬌𐬙𐬁𐬨𐬀
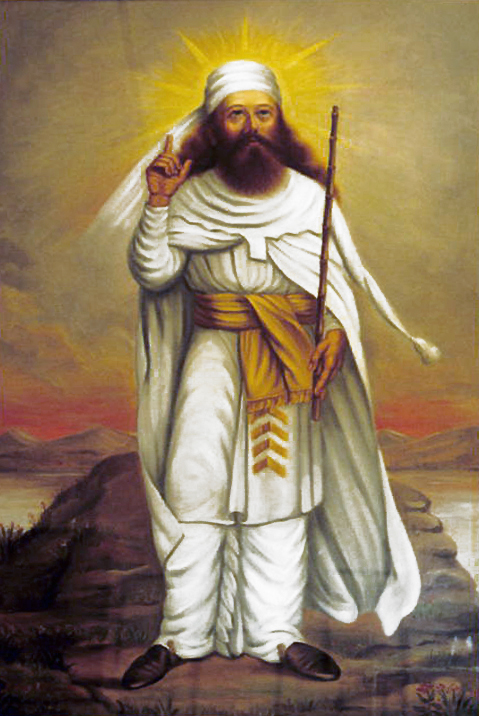
- Modern depiction of Zoroaster featured at the Fire Temple of Yazd

Personal life
- Born: Unknown, traditionally c. 624–599 BC (Note: Zoroastrian tradition from no later than the 10th century AD holds that Zoroaster's revelation happened at 30 years old "258 years before the time of Alexander" (almost certainly based on faulty reasoning, see the section on Zoroastrian and Muslim scholarship), where "time of Alexander" is vague, and could either begin with his accession (336 BC), his conquest of Iran, or, more likely, with the establishment of the Anno Graecorum following the conquest of Babylon by Seleucus I Nicator (312/311 BC). Most scholars believe this dating to be far too recent based on linguistic and socio-cultural evidence, instead placing Zoroaster's life sometime in the 2nd millennium or early 1st millennium BC, with some suggesting dates as early as the 18th century BC, or as late as the 6th century BC, the latter of which would seemingly match with the tradition. Sometime around c. 1000 BC, give or take a few centuries, is the most conservative estimate.) Possibly Bactra (Balkh, modern-day Afghanistan)
- Died: Unknown, traditionally c. 547–522 BC (age 77) (Note: Zoroastrian tradition usually places Zoroaster's death at 77 years and 40 days of age. Celebrations of Zoroaster's birth and death place them at around 26 March and 26 December respectively, which contradict the traditional account. It is likely the dates are symbolic at best and conjectural at worst.)
- Spouse: Two unnamed wives; Hvōvi
- Children: Isat Vâstra; Urvatat Nara; Hvare Chithra; Freni; Thriti; Pouruchista
- Parents: Pourushaspa; Dugdōw
- Known for: Spiritual founder and prophet of Zoroastrianism; Composer of the Gathas; Prophet in the Bahá'í Faith, Ahmadiyya, and the Ahmadi Religion

Zarathushtra Spitama, more commonly known as Zoroaster (Note: US: /ˈzɔːroʊˌæstər/ UK: /ˌzɒroʊˈæstər/) or Zarathustra, (Note: /ˌzærəˈθuːstrə/) was an Iranian religious reformer who challenged the tenets of the contemporary Ancient Iranian religion, becoming the spiritual founder of Zoroastrianism. (Note: Known by its adherents as Mazdayasnā (lit. 'Mazda-worship') and Beh-dīn (lit. 'good religion').) In the oldest Zoroastrian scriptures, the Gathas, which he is traditionally believed to have authored, he is described as a preacher (Note: Avestan: 𐬰𐬀𐬊𐬙𐬀𐬭, romanized: zaotar, cognate with the Sanskrit term होतृ (hótr), referring to Vedic priests.) and a poet-prophet. (Note: Avestan: 𐬆𐬭𐬆𐬱𐬌𐬱, romanized: ərəšiš, cognate with the Sanskrit term ऋषि (ṛ́ṣi), describing an enlightened poet of Vedic hymns.) Some have claimed, with much scholarly controversy, to find his influence in Heraclitus, Plato, Pythagoras, and, perhaps less controversially, in the Abrahamic religions, including Judaism, Christianity, and Islam, particularly through concepts of cosmic dualism and personal morality.

Zarathustra spoke Avestan, an old Iranian language which scholars lent its name to after the Avesta, the corpus of Zoroastrian religious texts written in the language. Based on this, it is tentative to place his homeland somewhere in the eastern regions of the Greater Iran (possibly Bactra, now in modern-day Afghanistan). His life is traditionally dated to some time around the 7th and 6th centuries BC; though most scholars, using linguistic and socio-cultural evidence, suggest a dating even further back to the end of the 2nd and the beginning of the 1st millennium BC.

Zoroastrianism eventually became Greater Iran's most prominent religion from around the 6th century BC, enjoying official sanction during the time of the Sassanid Empire, until the 7th century AD, when the religion was persecuted following the Arab-Muslim conquest of Iran. Zoroaster is credited with authorship of the Gathas as well as the Yasna Haptanghaiti, a series of hymns composed in Old Avestan that cover core Zoroastrian beliefs. Little is known about Zoroaster; most of his life is known only from these scant texts. By modern standards of historiography, no evidence can place him into a fixed period and the historicization surrounding him may be a part of a trend from before the 10th century AD that historicizes legends and myths.

His name likely means "he who manages camels", though its etymology has multiple interpretations, and the Greek form "Zoroaster" stems from later transliterations. According to Zoroastrian tradition, Zoroaster was trained as a priest from a young age and, around age 30, experienced a divine revelation which introduced him to Ahura Mazda, the Wise Lord, and the dualism of truth (asha) versus deception (druj). He is said to have gained royal patronage under King Vishtaspa, spread his teachings, and founded a community, marrying three times and having six children. Zoroastrian texts portray his philosophy as emphasizing free will, ethical responsibility, and aligning with asha through good thoughts, words, and deeds.

== Name and etymology ==
Zoroaster's name in his native language, Avestan, was probably Zaraθuštra. His translated name, "Zoroaster", derives from a later (5th century BC) Greek adaptation, Zōroastrēs (Ζωροάστρης), as used in Xanthus's Lydiaca (Fragment 32) and in Plato's First Alcibiades (122a1). This form appears subsequently in the Latin Zōroastrēs, and, in later Greek orthographies, as Ζωροάστρις, Zōroastris. The Greek form of the name appears to be based on a phonetic adaptation or semantic substitution of Avestan zaraθ- with the Greek ζωρός, zōros (literally 'undiluted') and the BMAC substrate -uštra with ἄστρον, astron, 'star'.

In Avestan, Zaraθuštra is generally accepted to derive from an Old Iranian *Zaratuštra-. The second component of the name (-uštra-) is thought to be the Indo-Iranian root for 'camel', with the entire name meaning 'he who can manage camels'. (Note: Originally proposed by Burnouf) Reconstructions from later Iranian languages—particularly from the Middle Persian (300 BC) Zardusht, which is the form that the name took in the 9th- to 12th-century Zoroastrian texts—suggest that *Zaratuštra- might be a zero-grade form of *Zarantuštra-. Subject then to whether Zaraθuštra derives from *Zarantuštra- or from *Zaratuštra-, several interpretations have been proposed. (Note: For refutation of these and other proposals, see Humbach, 1991.)

If Zarantuštra is the original form, it may mean 'with old/aging camels', related to Avestic zarant- (cf. Pashto zōṛ and Ossetian zærond, 'old'; Middle Persian zāl, 'old'):

- 'with angry/furious camels': from Avestan *zarant-, 'angry, furious'.
- 'who is driving camels' or 'who is fostering/cherishing camels': related to Avestan zarš-, 'to drag'.
- Mayrhofer (1977) proposed an etymology of 'who is desiring camels' or 'longing for camels' and related to Vedic Sanskrit har-, 'to like', and perhaps (though ambiguous) also to Avestan zara-.
- 'with yellow camels': parallel to Younger Avestan zairi-.

The interpretation of the -θ- (/θ/) in the Avestan zaraθuštra was for a time itself subjected to heated debate because the -θ- is an irregular development: as a rule, *zarat- (a first element that ends in a dental consonant) should have Avestan zarat- or zarat̰- as a development from it. Why this is not so for zaraθuštra has not yet been determined. Notwithstanding the phonetic irregularity, that Avestan zaraθuštra with its -θ- was linguistically an actual form is shown by later attestations reflecting the same basis.

In Middle Persian, the name is 𐭦𐭫𐭲𐭥𐭱𐭲, Zardu(x)št, in Parthian Zarhušt, in Manichaean Middle Persian Zrdrwšt, in Early New Persian Zardušt, and in modern (New Persian), the name is زرتشت, Zartosht.

The name is attested in Classical Armenian sources as Zradašt (often with the variant Zradešt). The most important of these testimonies were provided by the Armenian authors Eznik of Kolb, Elishe, and Movses Khorenatsi. The spelling Zradašt was formed through an older form which started with *zur-, a fact which the German Iranologist Friedrich Carl Andreas (1846–1930) used as evidence for a Middle Persian spoken form *Zur(a)dušt. Based on this assumption, Andreas even went so far to form conclusions from this also for the Avestan form of the name. However, the modern Iranologist Rüdiger Schmitt rejects Andreas's assumption, and states that the older form which started with *zur- was just influenced by Armenian zur ('wrong, unjust, idle'), which therefore means that "the name must have been reinterpreted in an anti-Zoroastrian sense by the Armenian Christians". Furthermore, Schmitt adds: "it cannot be excluded, that the (Parthian or) Middle Persian form, which the Armenians took over (Zaradušt or the like), was merely metathesized to pre-Arm. *Zuradašt".

The name can also appear in the form Sarastro.

== Date ==
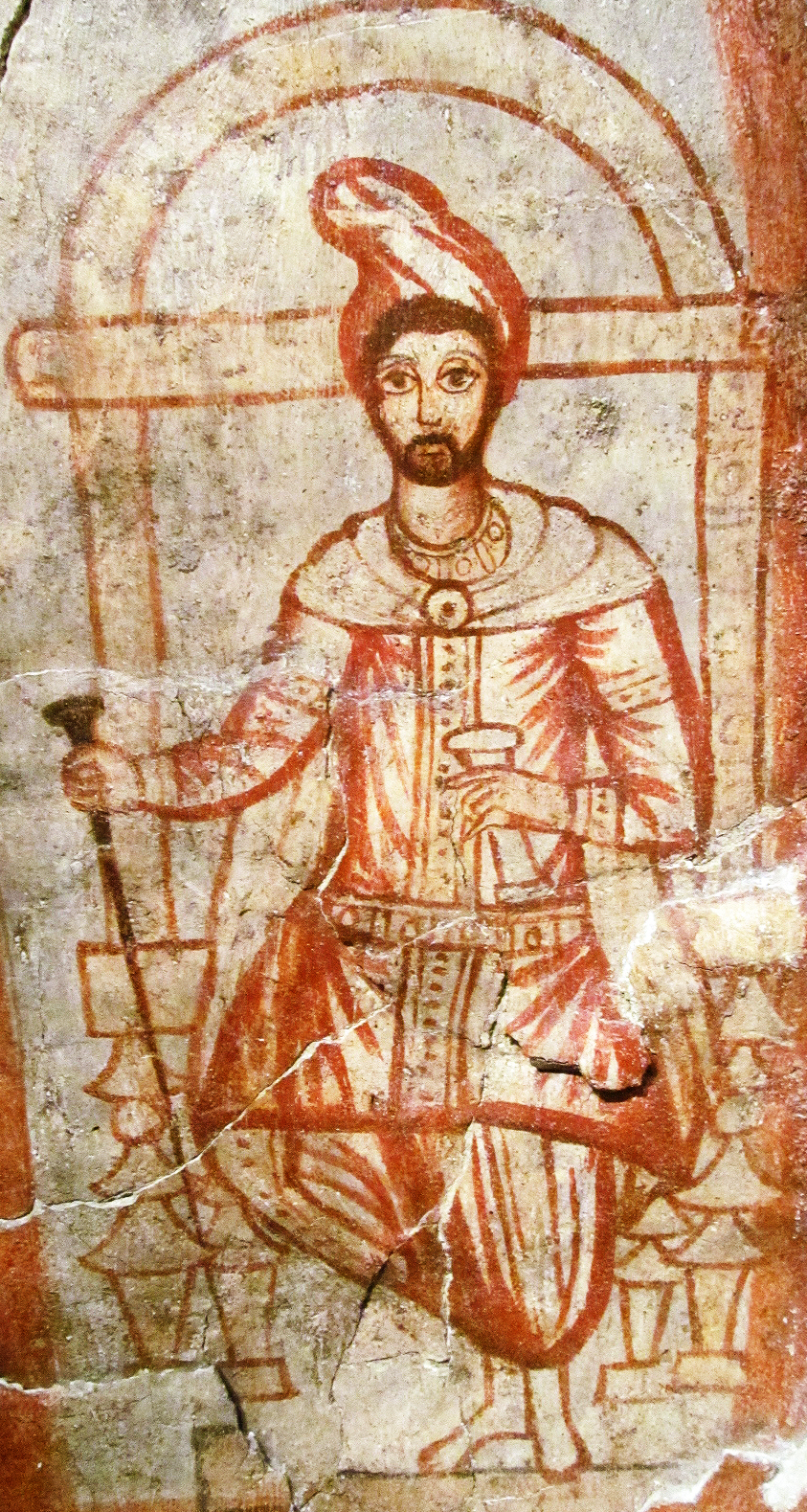
3rd-century Mithraic depiction of Zoroaster found in Dura Europos, Syria by Franz Cumont

There is no consensus on the dating of Zoroaster. The Avesta gives no direct information about it, while historical sources are conflicting. Some scholars base their date reconstruction on the Proto-Indo-Iranian language and Proto-Indo-Iranian religion, while others use internal evidence. While many scholars today consider a date around 1000 BC to be the most likely, others still consider a range of dates between 1500 and 500 BC to be possible.

=== Classical scholarship ===
Classical scholarship in the 6th to 4th century BC believed he existed 6,000 years before Xerxes I's invasion of Greece in 480 BC (Xanthus, Eudoxus, Aristotle, Hermippus), which is a possible misunderstanding of the Zoroastrian four cycles of 3,000 years (i.e. 12,000 years). This belief is recorded by Diogenes Laërtius, and variant readings could place it 600 years before Xerxes I, somewhere before 1000 BC. However, Diogenes also mentions Hermodorus's belief that Zoroaster lived 5,000 years before the Trojan War, which would mean he lived around 6200 BC. The 10th-century Suda provides a date of 500 years before the Trojan War. Pliny the Elder cited Eudoxus which placed his death 6,000 years before Plato, c. 6300 BC. Other pseudo-historical constructions are those of Aristoxenus who recorded Zaratas the Chaldeaean to have taught Pythagoras in Babylon, or lived at the time of mythological Ninus and Semiramis. According to Pliny the Elder, there were two Zoroasters. The first lived thousands of years ago, while the second accompanied Xerxes I in the invasion of Greece in 480 BC. Some scholars propose that the chronological calculation for Zoroaster was developed by Persian magi in the 4th century BC, and as the early Greeks learned about him from the Achaemenids, this indicates they did not regard him as a contemporary of Cyrus the Great, but as a remote figure.

=== Zoroastrian and Muslim scholarship ===
Some later pseudo-historical and Zoroastrian sources (the Bundahishn, which references a date "258 years before Alexander") place Zoroaster in the 6th century BC, (Note: "258 years before Alexander" is only superficially precise. It has been suggested that this "traditional date" is an adoption of some date from foreign sources, from the Greeks or the Babylonians for example, which the priesthood then reinterpreted. The traditional Zoroastrian date originates in the period immediately following Alexander the Great's conquest of the Achaemenid Empire in 330 BC.) The Seleucid rulers who gained power following Alexander's death instituted an "Age of Alexander" as the new calendrical epoch. This did not appeal to the Zoroastrian priesthood who then attempted to establish an "Age of Zoroaster". To do so, they needed to establish when Zoroaster had lived, which they accomplished by (erroneously, according to Mary Boyce some even identified Cyrus with Vishtaspa) counting back the length of successive generations, until they concluded that Zoroaster must have lived "258 years before Alexander". This estimate then re-appeared in the 9th- to 12th-century Arabic and Pahlavi texts of Zoroastrian tradition, (Note: The Bundahishn computes "200 and some years" (GBd xxxvi.9) or "284 years" (IBd xxxiv.9). That '258 years' was the generally accepted figure is however noted by al-Biruni and al-Masudi, with the latter specifically stating (in 943/944 AD) that "the Magians count a period of two hundred and fifty-eight years between their prophet and Alexander.") like the 10th century Al-Masudi who cited a prophecy from a lost Avestan book in which Zoroaster foretold the Empire's destruction in 300 years, but the religion would last for 1,000 years.

In Zoroastrian scriptures, King Yima (Jam) and the legendary Pishdadian dynasty preceded the time when Zoroaster proclaimed his teachings.

=== Modern scholarship ===
In modern scholarship, two main approaches can be distinguished: a late dating to the 7th and 6th centuries BC, based on the indigenous Zoroastrian tradition, and an early dating, which places his life more generally in the 15th to 9th centuries BC.

==== Late date ====
Some scholars propose a period between 7th and 6th century BC, for example, c. 650–600 BC or 559–522 BC. The latest possible date is the mid 6th century BC, at the time of Achaemenid Empire's Darius I, or his predecessor Cyrus the Great. This date gains credence mainly from attempts to connect figures in Zoroastrian texts to historical personages; thus some have postulated that the mythical Vishtaspa who appears in an account of Zoroaster's life was Darius I's father, also named Vishtaspa (or Hystaspes in Greek). However, if this was true, it seems unlikely that the Avesta would not mention that Vishtaspa's son became the ruler of the Persian Empire, or that this key fact about Darius's father would not be mentioned in the Behistun Inscription. It is also possible that Darius I's father was named in honor of the Zoroastrian patron, indicating possible Zoroastrian faith by Arsames.

==== Early date ====
Scholars such as Mary Boyce (who dated Zoroaster to somewhere between 1700 and 1000 BC) used linguistic and socio-cultural evidence to place Zoroaster between 1500 and 1000 BC (or 1200 and 900 BC). The basis of this theory is primarily proposed on linguistic similarities between the Old Avestan language of the Zoroastrian Gathas and the Sanskrit of the Rigveda (c. 1700–1100 BC), a collection of early Vedic hymns. Both texts are considered to have a common archaic Indo-Iranian origin. The Gathas portray an ancient Stone-Bronze Age bipartite society of warrior-herdsmen and priests (compared to Bronze tripartite society; some conjecture that it depicts the Yaz culture), and that it is thus implausible that the Gathas and Rigveda could have been composed more than a few centuries apart. These scholars suggest that Zoroaster lived in an isolated tribe or composed the Gathas before the 1200–1000 BC migration by the Iranians from the steppe to the Iranian Plateau. The shortfall of the argument is the vague comparison, and the archaic language of Gathas does not necessarily indicate time difference.

It has been suggested by Silk Road Seattle, using its own interpretations of Victor H. Mair's writings on the topic that Zoroaster could have been born in the 2nd millennium BC.

Almut Hintze, the British Library, and the European Research Council have dated Zoroaster to roughly 3,500 years ago, in the 2nd millennium BC.

== Place ==
The birthplace of Zoroaster is also unknown, and the language of the Gathas is not similar to the proposed north-western and north-eastern regional dialects of Persia. It is also suggested that he was born in one of the two areas and later lived in the other area.

Yasna 9 and 17 cite the Ditya River in Airyanem Vaējah (Middle Persian Ērān Wēj) as Zoroaster's home and the scene of his first appearance. The Avesta (both Old and Younger portions) does not mention the Achaemenids or of any West Iranian tribes such as the Medes, Persians, or even the Parthians. The Farvardin Yasht refers to some Iranian peoples that are unknown in the Greek and Achaemenid sources about the 6th and 5th century BC Eastern Iran. The Vendidad contain 17 regional names, most of which are located in north-eastern and eastern Iran.

However, in Yasna 59.18, the zaraθuštrotema, or supreme head of the Zoroastrian priesthood, is said to reside in 'Ragha' (Badakhshan). In the 9th- to 12th-century Middle Persian texts of Zoroastrian tradition, 'Ragha' and many other places appear as locations in Western Iran. While the land of Media does not figure at all in the Avesta (the westernmost location noted in the scripture is Arachosia), the Būndahišn, or "Primordial Creation", (20.32 and 24.15) puts Ragha in Media (medieval Rai). However, in Avestan, Ragha is simply a toponym meaning 'plain, hillside.'

Apart from these indications in Middle Persian sources that are open to interpretations, there are a number of other sources. The Greek and Latin sources are divided on the birthplace of Zoroaster. Among the Greek accounts, Ctesias located him in Bactria, Diodorus Siculus placed him among Ariaspai (in Sistan), Cephalion and Justin suggests east of greater Iran, whereas Pliny and Origen suggest west of Iran as his birthplace. Moreover, there is the suggestion that there has been more than one Zoroaster.

On the other hand, in post-Islamic sources Shahrastani (1086–1153), an Iranian writer originally from Shahristān, in present-day Turkmenistan, proposed that Zoroaster's father was from Atropatene (also in Medea) and his mother was from Rey. Coming from a reputed scholar of religion, this was a serious blow to the various regions which all claimed that Zoroaster originated from their homelands, some of which had then decided that Zoroaster must have then been buried in their regions or composed his Gathas there or preached there. Arabic sources of the same period and the same region of historical Persia also consider Azerbaijan as the birthplace of Zarathustra.

By the late 20th century, most scholars had settled on an origin in eastern Greater Iran. Gnoli proposed Sistan, Baluchistan (though in a much wider scope than the present-day province) as the homeland of Zoroastrianism; Frye voted for Bactria and Chorasmia; Khlopin suggests the Tedzen Delta in present-day Turkmenistan. Sarianidi considered the Bactria–Margiana Archaeological Complex region as "the native land of the Zoroastrians and, probably, of Zoroaster himself." Boyce includes the steppes to the west from the Volga. The medieval "from Media" hypothesis is no longer taken seriously, and Zaehner has even suggested that this was a Magi-mediated issue to garner legitimacy, but this has been likewise rejected by Gershevitch and others.

The 2005 Encyclopedia Iranica article on the history of Zoroastrianism summarizes the issue with "while there is general agreement that he did not live in western Iran, attempts to locate him in specific regions of eastern Iran, including Central Asia, remain tentative".

== Life ==
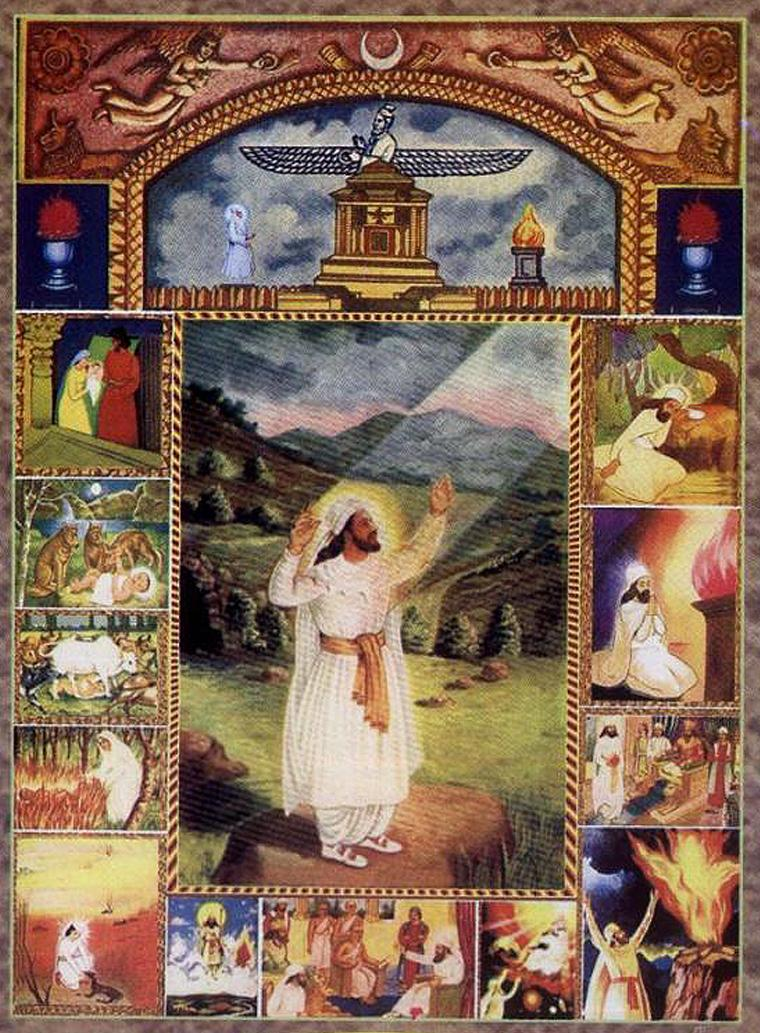
19th century painting depicting the events of Zoroaster's life

Zoroaster is recorded as the son of Pourushaspa of the Spitama family, and Dugdōw, while his great-grandfather was Haēčataspa. All the names appear appropriate to the nomadic tradition. His father's name means 'possessing gray horses' (with the word aspa meaning 'horse'), while his mother's means 'milkmaid'. According to the tradition, he had four brothers, two older and two younger, whose names are given in much later Pahlavi work.

Zoroaster's training for priesthood probably started very early around seven years of age. He became a priest probably around the age of 15, and according to Gathas, gaining knowledge from other teachers and personal experience from traveling when he left his parents at age 20. By the age of 30, Zoroaster experienced a revelation during a spring festival; on the river bank he saw a shining being, who revealed himself as Vohu Manah (Good Purpose) and taught him about Ahura Mazda (Wise Lord) and five other radiant figures. Zoroaster soon became aware of the existence of two primal spirits, the second being Angra Mainyu (Destructive Spirit), with opposing concepts of Asha (order) and Druj (deception). Thus he decided to spend his life teaching people to seek Asha. He received further revelations and saw a vision of the seven Amesha Spenta, and his teachings were collected in the Gathas and the Avesta.

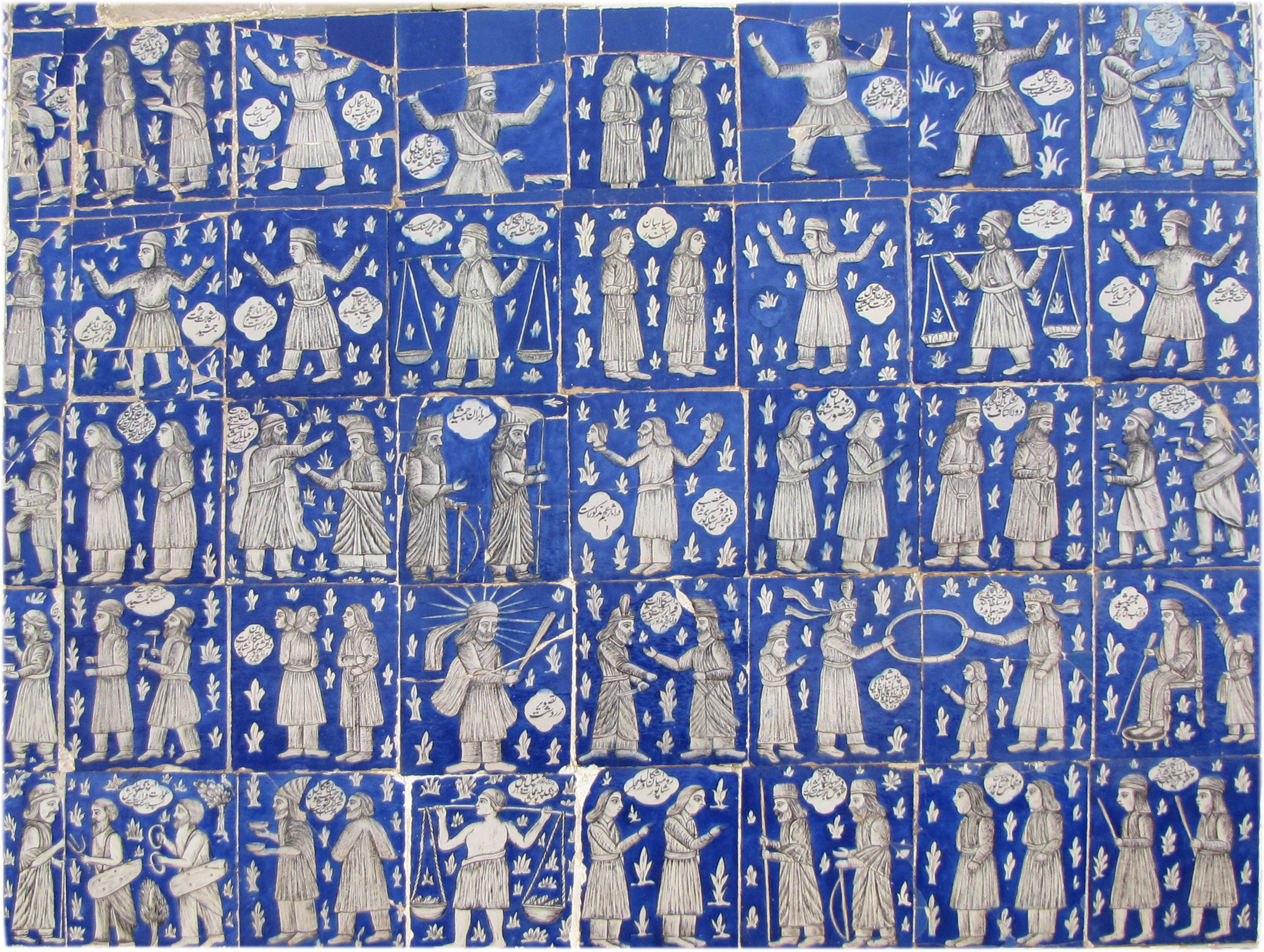
The rings of the Fravashi

Eventually, at the age of about 42, Zoroaster received the patronage of queen Hutaosa and a ruler named Vishtaspa, an early adherent of Zoroastrianism (possibly from Bactria according to the Shahnameh).

According to the tradition, he lived for many years after Vishtaspa's conversion, managed to establish a faithful community, and married three times. His first two wives bore him three sons, Isat Vâstra, Urvatat Nara, and Hvare Chithra, and three daughters, Freni, Thriti, and Pouruchista. His third wife, Hvōvi, was childless. Zoroaster died when he was 77 years and 40 days old. There are conflicting traditions on Zoroaster's manner of death. The most common is that he was murdered by a karapan (priest of the old religion) named Brādrēs, while performing at an altar. The Dēnkart, and the epic Shahnameh, ascribe his death to a Turanian soldier named Baraturish, potentially a spin on the same figure, while other traditions combine both accounts or hold that he died of old age.

=== Cypress of Kashmar ===
The Cypress of Kashmar was a cypress tree, said to have sprung from a branch brought by Zoroaster from Paradise and to have stood in today's Kashmar in northeastern Iran and to have been planted by Zoroaster in honor of the conversion of King Vishtaspa to Zoroastrianism. According to the Iranian physicist and historian Zakariya al-Qazwini, King Vishtaspa had been a patron of Zoroaster who planted the tree himself. In his ʿAjā'ib al-makhlūqāt wa gharā'ib al-mawjūdāt ('The Wonders of Creatures and the Marvels of Creation'), he further describes how the Al-Mutawakkil in 247 AH (861 AD) caused the mighty cypress to be felled, and then transported it across Iran, to be used for beams in his new palace at Samarra. Before, he wanted the tree to be reconstructed before his eyes. This was done in spite of protests by the Iranians, who offered a very great sum of money to save the tree. Al-Mutawakkil never saw the cypress, because he was murdered by a Turkic soldier (possibly in the employ of his son) on the night when it arrived on the banks of the Tigris.

== Influences ==
=== In Christianity and Judaism ===
Athanasius Kircher identified Zoroaster with Ham. The French figurist Jesuit missionary to China Joachim Bouvet thought that Zoroaster, the Chinese cultural hero Fuxi and Hermes Trismegistus were actually the Biblical patriarch Enoch. Some legends identify Baruch with Zoroaster.

=== In Islam ===
The Encyclopædia Iranica claims that the stories of Zoroaster's life were attributed to him by quoting stories from Christianity and Judaism, but the most quotations were from Islam after the entry of Muslims into Persia, as it was a means for the Zoroastrian clergy to strengthen their religion.

The orientalist Arthur Christensen in his book ''Iran During The Sassanid Era'', mentioned that the sources dating back to the era of the Sasanian state in ancient Persian that refer to the Zoroastrian doctrine do not match the sources that appeared after the collapse of the state, such as the Pahlavi source and others. The reason is that because of the fall of the Sasanian state, the Zoroastrian clerics tried to save their religion from extinction through modifying it to resemble the religion of Muslims to retain followers in the Zoroastrian religion.

Gherardo Gnoli comments that the Islamic conquest of Persia caused a huge impact on the Zoroastrian doctrine:

After the Islamic conquest of Persia and the migration of many Zoroastrians to India and after being exposed to Islamic and Christian propaganda, the Zoroastrians, especially the Parsis in India, went so far as to deny dualism and consider themselves completely monotheists. After several transformations and developments, one of the distinctive features of the Zoroastrian religion gradually faded away and almost disappeared from modern Zoroastrianism

Maneckji Nusserwanji Dhalla described the doctrine of the Gayomarthians sect as another attempt to mitigate the dualism that has always been the essence of Zoroastrianism. This was due to the Prophet Muhammad’s emphasis on monotheism and the Muslims’ mockery of the doctrine of worshipping two gods, which made the Zoroastrians view dualism as a defect, so they added monotheism, which led to the Zoroastrians’ division into sects and he mentions examples of the Zoroastrian attempt to establish a monotheistic belief by diminishing the importance of Ahriman, including that Ahura Mazda and Ahriman were created from time, or that Ahura Mazda himself allowed the existence of evil, or that Ahriman was a corrupt angel who rebelled against Ahura Mazda. Then he mentions the name of a Persian book from the 15th century in which it is written that the Magi (Zoroastrians) believe that Allah and Iblis are brothers.

This provides an explanation of why a number of parallels have been drawn between Zoroastrian teachings and Islam. Such parallels include the evident similarities between Amesha Spenta and the archangel Gabriel, praying five times a day, covering one's head during prayer, and the mention of Thamud and Iram of the Pillars in the Quran.

The Sabians, who believed in free will coincident with Zoroastrians, are also mentioned in the Quran 22:17.

==== Muslim scholastic views ====
Like the Greeks of classical antiquity, Islamic tradition understands Zoroaster to be the founding prophet of the Magians (via Aramaic, Arabic Majūsiyya, collective Majūs). The 11th-century Cordoban Ibn Hazm (Zahiri school) contends that the designation kitābī "[follower] of the Scripture [of God]" cannot apply in light of the Zoroastrian assertion that their books were destroyed by Alexander. Citing the authority of the 8th-century al-Kalbi, the 9th- and 10th-century Sunni historian al-Tabari (I, 648) reports that Zaradusht bin Isfiman (an Arabic adaptation of "Zarathushtra Spitama") was an inhabitant of Israel and a servant of one of the disciples of the prophet Jeremiah. According to this tale, Zaradusht defrauded his master, who cursed him, causing him to become leprous (cf. Elisha's servant Gehazi in Jewish scripture). According to Ibn Kathir, Zoroaster came into conflict with Jeremiah which resulted in angry Jeremiah cast a curse upon Zoroaster, causing him to suffer Leprosy, and exiling him. Zoroaster later moved to a place of modern-day Azerbaijan which ruled by Bashtaasib (Vishtaspa), governor of Nebuchadnezzar, and spread his teaching of Zoroastrianism there. Bashtaasib then followed his teaching, forces the inhabitants of Persia to convert to Zoroastrianism and killed those who refused.

Ibn Kathir has quoted the original narrative was borrowed from Tabari's record of the "History of Jerusalem". He also mentioned that Zoroastrian was synonymous with Majus.

Sibt ibn al-Jawzi instead stated that some older narration said that Zoroaster was a former disciple of Uzair.

Al-Tabari (I, 681–683) recounts that Zaradusht accompanied a Jewish prophet to Bishtasb/Vishtaspa. Upon their arrival, Zaradusht translated the sage's Hebrew teachings for the king and so convinced him to convert (Tabari also notes that they had previously been Sabis) to the Magian religion.

The 12th-century heresiographer al-Shahrastani describes the Majusiya into three sects, the Kayumarthiya (an otherwise undocumented sect that – per Sharastani – seems to have had a stronger doctrine of Ahriman's "non-reality"), the Zurwaniya and the Zaradushtiya, among which Al-Shahrastani asserts that only the last of the three were properly followers of Zoroaster. As regards the recognition of a prophet, Zoroaster has said: "They ask you as to how should they recognize a prophet and believe him to be true in what he says; tell them what he knows the others do not, and he shall tell you even what lies hidden in your nature; he shall be able to tell you whatever you ask him and he shall perform such things which others cannot perform." (Namah Shat Vakhshur Zartust, .5–7. 50–54)

==== Ahmadiyya view ====
The Ahmadiyya Community views Zoroaster as a Prophet and describe the expressions of the all-good Ahura Mazda and evil Ahriman as merely referring to the coexistence of forces of good and evil enabling humans to exercise free will.

=== In Manichaeism ===
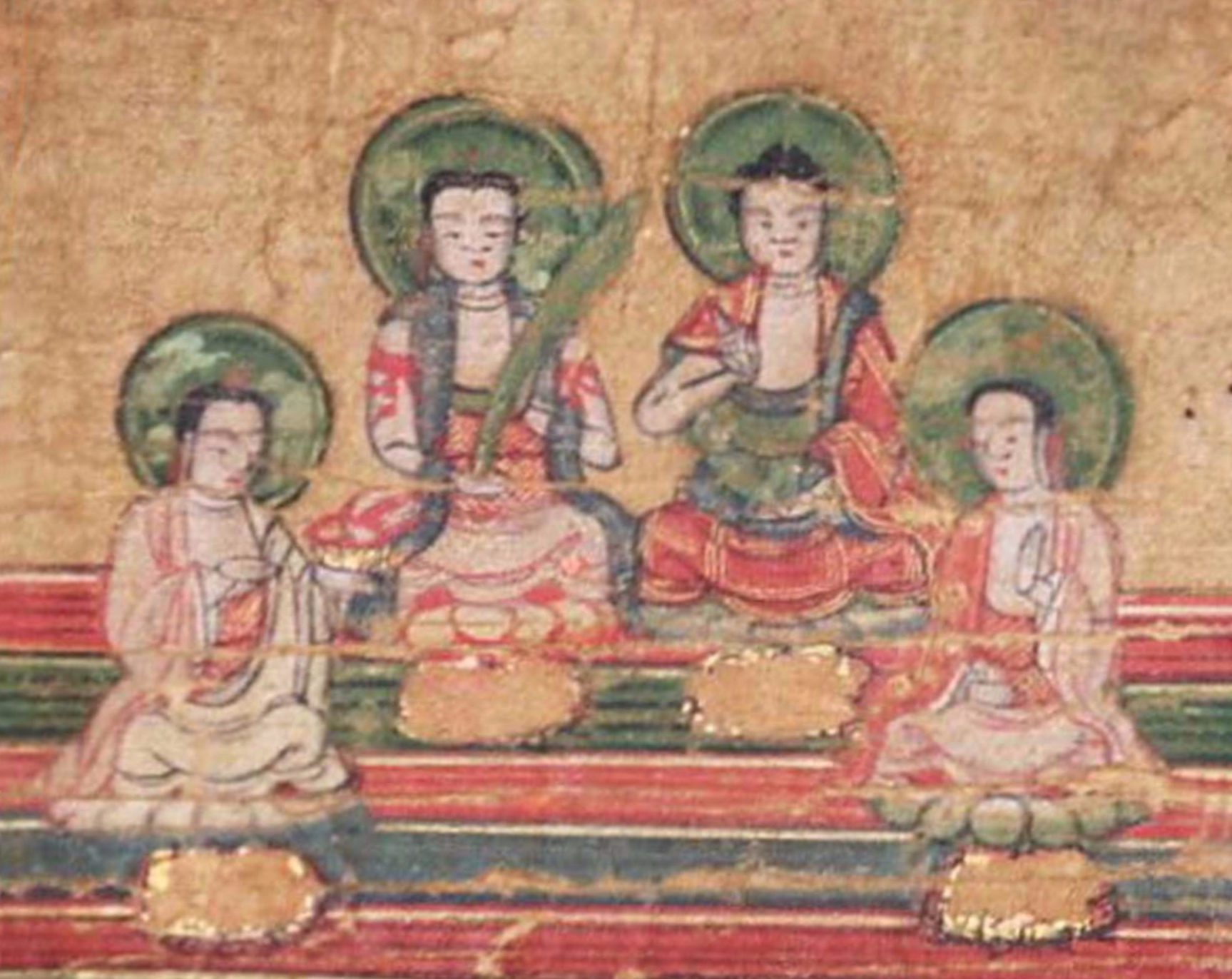
The four primary prophets of Manichaeism in the Manichaean Diagram of the Universe, from left to right: Mani, Zoroaster, Buddha and Jesus.

Manichaeism considered Zoroaster to be a figure in a line of prophets of which Mani (216–276) was the culmination. Zoroaster's ethical dualism is—to an extent—incorporated in Manichaeism's doctrine which, unlike Mani's thoughts, viewed the world as being locked in an epic battle between opposing forces of good and evil. Manicheanism also incorporated other elements of Zoroastrian tradition, particularly the names of supernatural beings; however, many of these other Zoroastrian elements are either not part of Zoroaster's own teachings or are used quite differently from how they are used in Zoroastrianism.

=== In the Bahá'í Faith ===
Zoroaster appears in the Bahá'í Faith as a "Manifestation of God", one of a line of prophets who have progressively revealed the Word of God to a gradually maturing humanity. Zoroaster thus shares an exalted station with Abraham, Moses, Krishna, Jesus, Muhammad, the Báb, and the founder of the Bahá'í Faith, Bahá'u'lláh. Shoghi Effendi, the head of the Bahá'í Faith in the first half of the 20th century, saw Bahá'u'lláh as the fulfillment of a post-Sassanid Zoroastrian prophecy that saw a return of Sassanid emperor Bahram; Effendi also stated that Zoroaster lived roughly 1000 years before Jesus. (Note: From a letter of the Universal House of Justice, Department of the Secretariat, 13 May 1979, to Gayle Woolson published in Hornby (1983), p. 501.)

== Philosophy ==
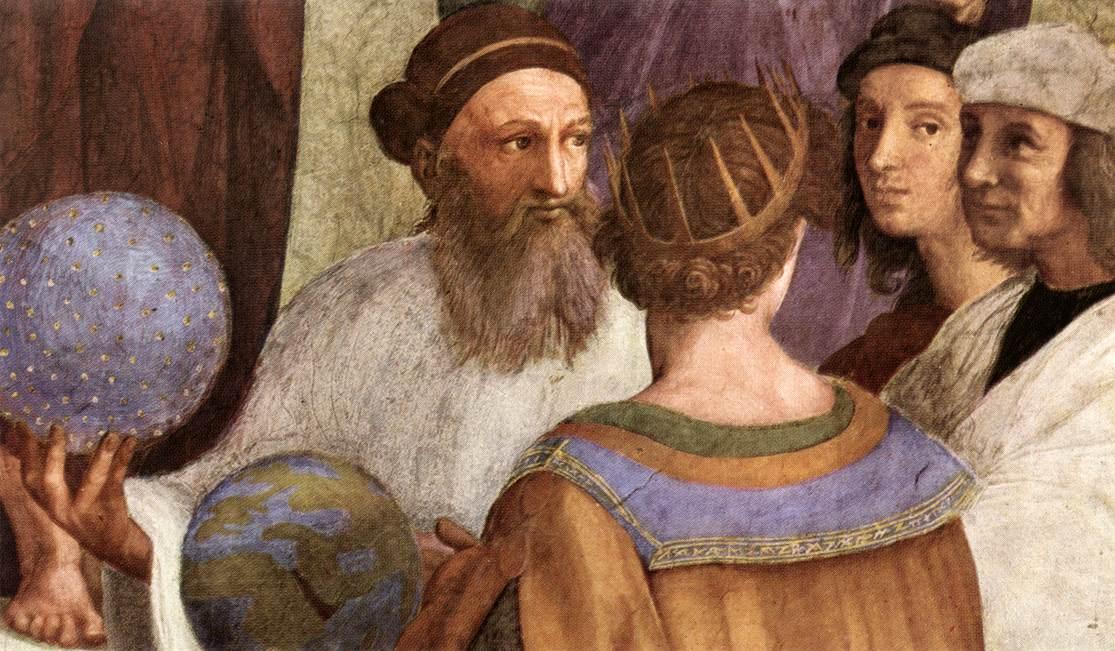
Detail of The School of Athens by Raphael, 1509, showing what may be Zoroaster (left, with star-studded globe)

In the Gathas, Zoroaster sees the human condition as the mental struggle between aša and druj. The cardinal concept of aša—which is highly nuanced and difficult to translate—is at the foundation of all Zoroastrian doctrine, including that of Ahura Mazda (who is aša), creation (that is aša), existence (that is aša), and as the condition for free will.

The purpose of humankind, like that of all other creation, is to sustain and align itself to aša. For humankind, this occurs through active ethical participation in life, ritual, and the exercise of constructive/good thoughts, words, and deeds.

Elements of Zoroastrian philosophy entered the West through their influence on Judaism and Platonism and have been identified as one of the key early events in the development of philosophy. Among the classic Greek philosophers, Heraclitus is often referred to as inspired by Zoroaster's thinking.

In 2005, the Oxford Dictionary of Philosophy ranked Zoroaster as first in the chronology of philosophers. Zoroaster's impact lingers today due in part to the system of religious ethics he founded called Mazdayasna. The word Mazdayasna is Avestan and is translated as 'Worship of Wisdom/Mazda' in English. The encyclopedia Natural History (Pliny) claims that Zoroastrians later educated the Greeks who, starting with Pythagoras, used a similar term, philosophy, or "love of wisdom" to describe the search for ultimate truth.

Zoroaster emphasized the freedom of the individual to choose right or wrong and individual responsibility for one's deeds. This personal choice to accept aša and shun druj is one's own decision and not a dictate of Ahura Mazda. For Zoroaster, by thinking good thoughts, saying good words, and doing good deeds (e.g. assisting the needy, doing good works, or conducting good rituals) one increases aša in the world and in themselves, celebrating the divine order, and coming a step closer on the everlasting road to Frashokereti.

== Iconography ==
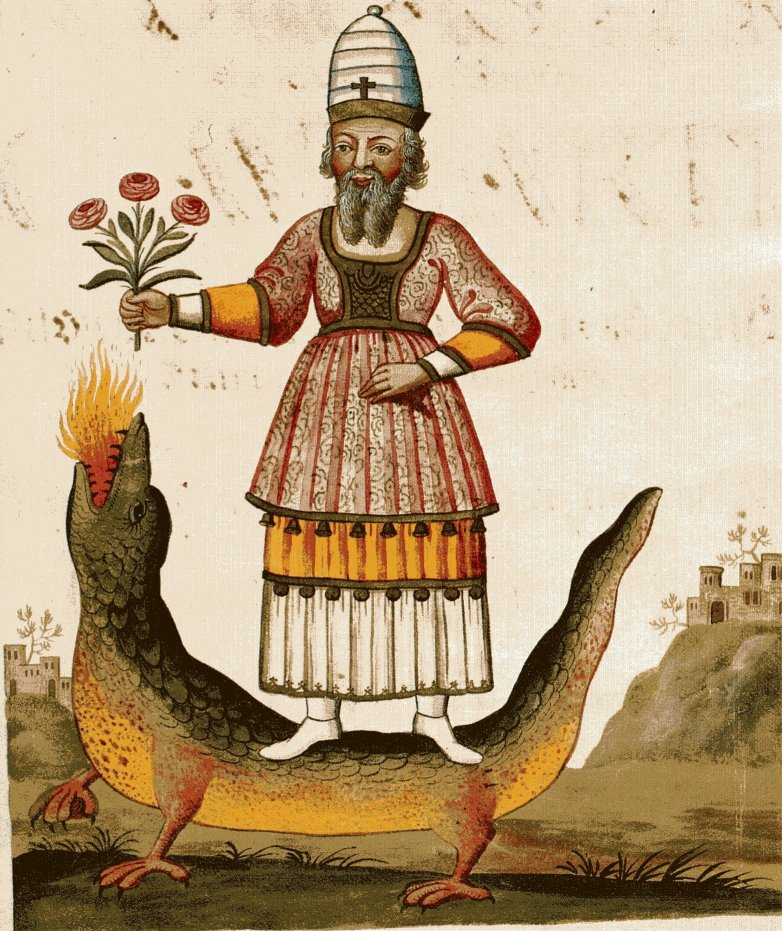
Depiction of Zoroaster in Clavis Artis, an alchemy manuscript published in Germany in the late 17th or early 18th century and pseudoepigraphically attributed to Zoroaster

Beginning in the nineteenth century, Zoroaster was visually depicted with physical attributes borrowed from other faith traditions. He is rarely depicted as looking directly at the viewer; instead, he appears to be looking slightly upwards, as if beseeching. He is almost always depicted with a beard along with other factors bearing similarities to 19th-century portraits of Jesus.

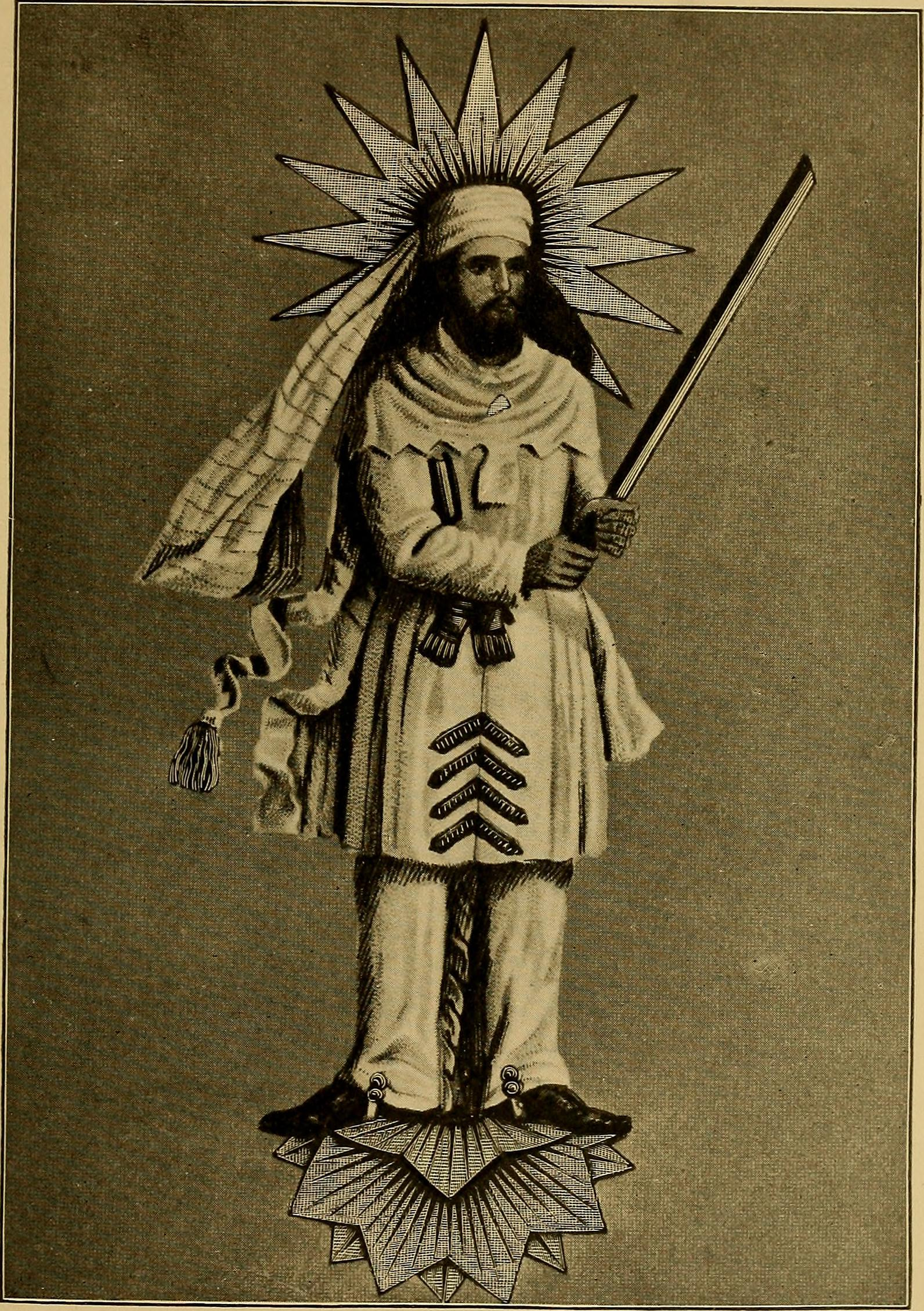
Indian Zoroastrian depiction of Zoroaster from a 1906 travel guide. Derived from a figure that appears in a 4th-century sculpture at Taq-e Bostan in South-Western Iran. The original is now believed to be either a representation of Mithra or Hvare-khshaeta.

A Sassanid-era rock-face carving at Taq-e Bostan depicts a figure, with a baresman in hand, a gloriole around his head and standing on a lotus, presiding over the coronation of either Ardashir I or II. Now identified as Mithra it was mistakenly believed to be Zoroaster and directly inspired a widely circulated 19th-century painting of the prophet which in turn shaped many modern visual representations.

== Western references to Zoroaster and Zoroastrianism ==
=== In classical antiquity ===
The Greeks—in the Hellenistic sense of the term—had an understanding of Zoroaster as expressed by Plutarch, Diogenes Laertius, and Agathias that saw him, at the core, to be the "prophet and founder of the religion of the Iranian peoples," Beck notes that "the rest was mostly fantasy". Zoroaster was set in the ancient past, six to seven millennia before the Common Era, and was described as a king of Bactria or a Babylonian (or teacher of Babylonians), and with a biography typical of a Neopythagorean sage, i.e. having a mission preceded by ascetic withdrawal and enlightenment. However, at first mentioned in the context of dualism, in Moralia, Plutarch presents Zoroaster as "Zaratras," not realizing the two to be the same, and he is described as a "teacher of Pythagoras".

Zoroaster has also been described as a sorcerer-astrologer – the creator of both magic and astrology. Deriving from that image, and reinforcing it, was a "mass of literature" attributed to him and that circulated the Mediterranean world from the 3rd century BC to the end of antiquity and beyond.

The language of that literature was predominantly Greek, though at one stage or another various parts of it passed through Aramaic, Syriac, Coptic, or Latin. Its ethos and cultural matrix was likewise Hellenistic, and "the ascription of literature to sources beyond that political, cultural and temporal framework represents a bid for authority and a fount of legitimizing "alien wisdom". Zoroaster and the magi did not compose it, but their names sanctioned it." The attributions to "exotic" names (not restricted to magians) conferred an "authority of a remote and revelatory wisdom."

Among the named works attributed to "Zoroaster" is the treatise titled On Nature (Peri physeos), which appears to have originally constituted four volumes (i.e. papyrus rolls). Academic sources describe it as part of "Zoroastrian pseudepigrapha;" texts falsely attributed to Zoroaster in the Greco-Roman era.

Pliny the Elder names Zoroaster as the inventor of magic (Natural History 30.2.3). "However, a principle of the division of labor appears to have spared Zoroaster most of the responsibility for introducing the dark arts to the Greek and Roman worlds." That "dubious honor" went to the "fabulous magus, Ostanes, to whom most of the pseudepigraphic magical literature was attributed." Although Pliny calls him the inventor of magic, the Roman does not provide a "magician's persona" for him. Moreover, the little "magical" teaching that is ascribed to Zoroaster is actually very late, with the very earliest example being from the 14th century.

Zoroaster's association with astrology, according to Roger Beck, was based on his Babylonian origin, and Zoroaster's Greek name was identified at first by Diogenes Laertius with star-worship (astrothytes, 'star sacrificer"). Greek etymology of his name also associated its first syllable, Zōo-, with the phrase 'living' star.

The alternate Greek name for Zoroaster was Zaratras or Zaratas/Zaradas/Zaratos. Pythagoreans considered the mathematicians to have studied with Zoroaster in Babylonia. Lydus, in On the Months, attributes the creation of the seven-day week to "the Babylonians in the circle of Zoroaster and Hystaspes," and who did so because there were seven planets. Lucian of Samosata, in Mennipus 6, reports deciding to journey to Babylon "to ask one of the magi, Zoroaster's disciples and successors," for their opinion.

While the division along the lines of Zoroaster/astrology and Ostanes/magic is an "oversimplification, the descriptions do at least indicate what the works are not"; they were not expressions of Zoroastrian doctrine, they were not even expressions of what the Greeks and Romans "imagined the doctrines of Zoroastrianism to have been". The assembled fragments do not even show noticeable commonality of outlook and teaching among the several authors who wrote under each name.

Almost all Zoroastrian pseudepigrapha is now lost, and of the attested texts—with only one exception—only fragments have survived. Pliny's 2nd- or 3rd-century attribution of "two million lines" to Zoroaster suggest that (even if exaggeration and duplicates are taken into consideration) a formidable pseudepigraphic corpus once existed at the Library of Alexandria. This corpus can safely be assumed to be pseudepigrapha because no one before Pliny refers to literature by "Zoroaster", and on the authority of the 2nd-century Galen of Pergamon and from a 6th-century commentator on Aristotle it is known that the acquisition policies of well-endowed royal libraries created a market for fabricating manuscripts of famous and ancient authors.

The exception to the fragmentary evidence (i.e. reiteration of passages in works of other authors) is a complete Coptic tractate titled Zostrianos (after the first-person narrator) discovered in the Nag Hammadi library in 1945. A three-line cryptogram in the colophones following the 131-page treatise identify the work as "words of truth of Zostrianos. God of Truth [logos]. Words of Zoroaster." Invoking a "God of Truth" might seem Zoroastrian, but there is otherwise "nothing noticeably Zoroastrian" about the text and "in content, style, ethos and intention, its affinities are entirely with the congeners among the Gnostic tractates."

Another work circulating under the name of "Zoroaster" was the Asteroskopita (or Apotelesmatika), and which ran to five volumes (i.e. papyrus rolls). The title and fragments suggest that it was an astrological handbook, "albeit a very varied one, for the making of predictions." A third text attributed to Zoroaster is On Virtue of Stones (Peri lithon timion), of which nothing is known other than its extent (one volume) and that pseudo-Zoroaster 'sang' it (from which Franz Cumont and Joseph Bidez conclude that it was in verse). Numerous other fragments preserved in the works of other authors are attributed to "Zoroaster", but the titles of those books are not mentioned.

These pseudepigraphic texts aside, some authors did draw on a few genuinely Zoroastrian ideas. The Oracles of Hystaspes, by "Hystaspes", another prominent magian pseudo-author, is a set of prophecies distinguished from other Zoroastrian pseudepigrapha in that it draws on real Zoroastrian sources. Pliny, in his Natural History, attributes the invention of magic to Zoroaster and states that Zoroaster laughed on the day of his birth, although earlier in the work Pliny had sworn in the name of Hercules that no child had ever done so before the 40th day from his birth. Pliny also records that Zoroaster's head had pulsated so strongly that it repelled the hand when laid upon it, a presage of his future wisdom. Plutarch's description of its dualistic theologies reads thus: "Others call the better of these a god and his rival a daemon, as, for example, Zoroaster the Magus, who lived, so they record, five thousand years before the siege of Troy. He used to call the one Horomazes and the other Areimanius".

=== In the modern era ===
An early reference to Zoroaster in English literature occur in the writings of the physician-philosopher Sir Thomas Browne who asserted in his Religio Medici (1643):

I believe, besides Zoroaster, there were divers (Note: meaning "various") that writ before Moses, who notwithstanding have suffered the common fate of time.

— Religio Medici, Part 1, Section 23

In E. T. A. Hoffmann's novel Klein Zaches, genannt Zinnober (1819), the mage Prosper Alpanus states that Professor Zoroaster was his teacher.

In Thus Spoke Zarathustra (1885), considered to be his seminal work, the philosopher Friedrich Nietzsche gives to the central character the native Iranian name "Zarathustra". Nietzsche explained the choice of the name in his autobiographical work Ecce Homo: "Zarathustra was the first to see in the struggle of good and evil the true driving-wheel in the machinery of things [...] Zarathustra created the disastrous error that is morality: thus he must also be the first to acknowledge the mistake." Though the naming of Zarathustra is an acknowledgement of the lineage of moralism, Nietzsche advocates atheism and moral nihilism, directly contradicting the philosophy of Zoroaster, and makes subversive allusions to Zoroastrianism. Despite Nietzsche's iconoclasm, some admirers of pre-Islamic Persian culture see his use of the name "Zarathustra" as a mark of uncritical respect towards the historical figure.

== Notable influence on modern Western culture ==
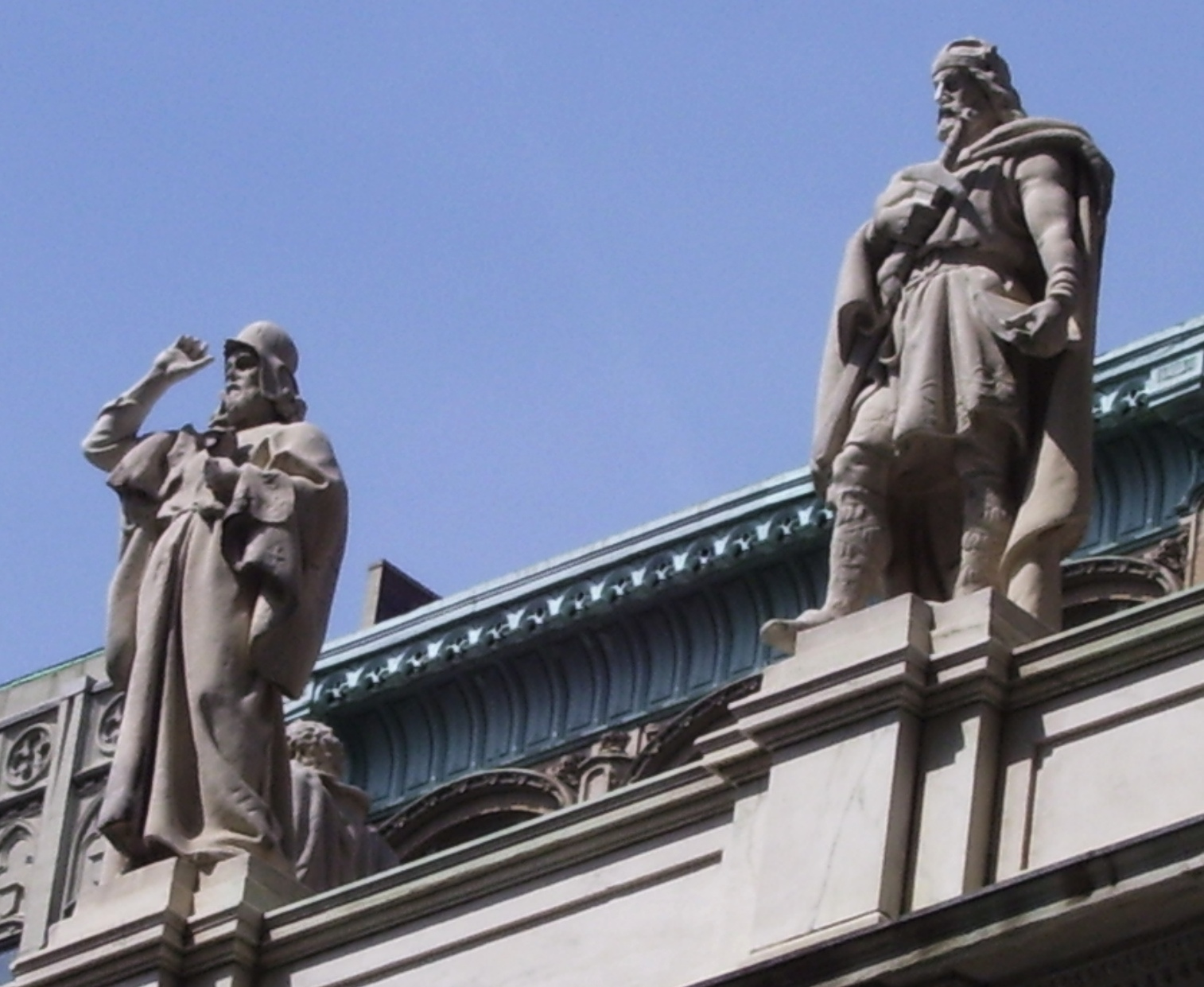
Zoroaster statue (left) atop the Appellate Division Courthouse of New York State

A sculpture of Zoroaster by Edward Clark Potter, representing ancient Persian judicial wisdom and dating to 1896, towers over the Appellate Division Courthouse of New York State at East 25th Street and Madison Avenue in Manhattan. A sculpture of Zoroaster is included among other prominent religious figures in a procession representing major faith traditions on the south side of Rockefeller Memorial Chapel at the University of Chicago. It features figures from Abraham to the Reformation, illustrating a historical continuum of religious thought that includes the likes of Zoroaster, Moses, Plato and others.

== See also ==
- List of founders of religious traditions
- Criticism of Zoroastrianism
- List of unsolved deaths
- Zartosht Bahram-e Pazhdo, author of a Persian epic biography on Zoroaster.
- Zoroaster and the Mount Savalan
- Zoroastre, an opera by Jean-Philippe Rameau

== Bibliography ==
- Ashouri, Daryoush (2003), "Nietzsche, Friedrich Wilhelm, and Persia", Encyclopaedia Iranica, New York: Encyclopædia Iranica online
- Bahram, Zartusht (2010), The Book of Zoroaster, or The Zartusht-Nāmah, London: Lulu
- Bailey, Harold Walter (1953), "Indo-Iranian Studies", Transactions of the Philological Society, 52: 21–42, doi:10.1111/j.1467-968X.1953.tb00268.x
- Beck, Roger (1991), "Thus Spake Not Zarathushtra: Zoroastrian Pseudepigrapha of the Greco-Roman World", in Boyce, Mary; Grenet, Frantz (eds.), A History of Zoroastrianism, vol. 3, Leiden: Brill Publishers, pp. 491–565
- Beck, Roger (2003), "Zoroaster, as perceived by the Greeks", Encyclopaedia Iranica, New York: Encyclopædia Iranica online
- Blackburn, Simon, ed. (1994), "Philosophy", The Oxford Dictionary of Philosophy, Oxford: Oxford University Press
- Blackburn, Simon, ed. (2005), The Oxford Dictionary of Philosophy (2nd ed.), London: Oxford University Press
- Boyce, Mary (1996) [1975], A History of Zoroastrianism: Volume I: The Early Period, BRILL, ISBN 90-04-10474-7
- Boyce, Mary (1982), A History of Zoroastrianism: Volume II: Under the Achaemenians, BRILL, ISBN 90-04-06506-7
- Boyce, Mary (2001), Zoroastrians: Their Religious Beliefs and Practices, Psychology Press, ISBN 978-0-415-23902-8
- Buck, Christopher (1998), "Bahá'u'lláh as Zoroastrian saviour" (PDF), Baháʼí Studies Review, 8, archived from the original (PDF) on 24 May 2013
- Burnouf, M. Eugène (1833), Commentaire sur le Yaçna, Vol. I, Paris: Imprimatur Royale
- Effendi, Shoghi (1991), "Buddha, Krishna, Zoroaster", The Compilation of Compilations, Volume I, Baháʼí Publications Australia, archived from the original on 20 September 2020
- Effendi, Shoghi (1944), God Passes By, Wilmette: Baháʼí Publishing Trust, ISBN 0-87743-020-9
- Fischer, Michael M. J. (2004), Mute Dreams, Blind Owls, and Dispersed Knowledges: Persian Poesis in the Transnational Circuitry, Duke University Press, ISBN 0-8223-8551-1
- Foltz, Richard (2013), Religions of Iran: From Prehistory to the Present, London: Oneworld publications, ISBN 978-1-78074-308-0
- Frye, Richard N. (1992), "Zoroastrians in Central Asia in Ancient Times", Journal of the K. R. Cama Oriental Institute, 58: 6–10
- Herzfeld, Ernst (1947), Zoroaster And His World: Volume II, Princeton University Press, p. 455
- Gershevitch, Ilya (1964), "Zoroaster's Own Contribution", Journal of Near Eastern Studies, 23 (1): 12–38, doi:10.1086/371754, S2CID 161954467
- Gnoli, Gherardo (2000), "Zoroaster in History", Biennial Yarshater Lecture Series, Vol. 2, New York: Bibliotheca Persica
- Gnoli, Gherardo (2003), "Agathias and the Date of Zoroaster", Eran ud Aneran, Festschrift Marshak, Venice: Libreria Editrice Cafoscarina
- Gronke, Monika (1993), "Derwische im Vorhof der Macht. Sozial- und Wirtschaftsgeschichte Nordwestirans im 13. und 14. Jahrhundert", Freiburger Islamstudien 15, Stuttgart: Franz Steiner Verlag
- Hale, Mark (2004). "Avestan". In Roger D. Woodard (ed.). The Cambridge Encyclopedia of the World's Ancient Languages. Cambridge University Press. ISBN 0-521-56256-2.
- Hornby, Helen, ed. (1983), Lights of Guidance: A Baháʼí Reference File, New Delhi: Baháʼí Publishing Trust, ISBN 81-85091-46-3
- Humbach, Helmut (1991), The Gathas of Zarathushtra and the other Old Avestan texts, Heidelberg: Winter
- Jackson, A. V. Williams (1896), "On the Date of Zoroaster", Journal of the American Oriental Society, 17, Journal of the American Oriental Society, Vol. 17: 1–22, doi:10.2307/592499, JSTOR 592499
- Jackson, A. V. Williams (1899), Zoroaster, the prophet of ancient Iran, New York: Columbia University Press
- Kellens, Jean (2011). "AVESTA i. Survey of the history and contents of the book". Encyclopædia Iranica. Vol. III. Iranica Foundation.
- Khamneipur, Abolghassem (2015), Zarathustra: Myth, Message, History, Voctoria, BC: FriesenPress
- Kingsley, Peter (1990), "The Greek Origin of the Sixth-Century Dating of Zoroaster", Bulletin of the School of Oriental and African Studies, 53 (2): 245–265, doi:10.1017/S0041977X00026069, S2CID 162273109
- Khlopin, I.N. (1992), "Zoroastrianism – Location and Time of its Origin", Iranica Antiqua, 27: 96–116, doi:10.2143/IA.27.0.2002124
- Kriwaczek, Paul (2002), In Search of Zarathustra – Across Iran and Central Asia to Find the World's First Prophet, London: Weidenfeld & Nicolson
- Lincoln, Bruce (1991), Death, War, and Sacrifice: Studies in Ideology & Practice, University of Chicago Press, ISBN 978-0-226-48200-2
- Mair, Victor H. (1990). "Old Sinitic *Myag, Old Persian Maguš and English Magician". Early China. 15: 27–47. doi:10.1017/S0362502800004995. ISSN 0362-5028. JSTOR 23351579. S2CID 192107986.
- Malandra, William W. (2005), "Zoroastrianism: Historical Review", Encyclopaedia Iranica, New York: Encyclopædia Iranica online
- Markwart, Joseph (1930), Das erste Kapitel der Gatha Uštavati (Orientalia 50), Rome: Pontificio Instituto Biblico
- Mayrhofer, Manfred (1977), Zum Namengut des Avesta, Vienna: Verlag der Österreichischen Akademie der Wissenschaften
- Moulton, James Hope (1917), The Treasure of the Magi, Oxford: Oxford University Press
- Moulton, James Hope (1913), Early Zoroastrianism, London: Williams and Norgate
- Mungello, David Emil (1989), Curious Land: Jesuit Accommodation and the Origins of Sinology, Honolulu: University of Hawaii Press, ISBN 0-8248-1219-0
- Nietzsche, Friedrich Wilhelm (1911), Levy, Oscar (ed.), Ecco Homo, The Complete Works of Friedrich Nietzsche, translated by Ludovici, Anthony Mario, Edinburgh: T. N. Foulis
- Nigosian, Solomon Alexander (1993), The Zoroastrian Faith: Tradition and Modern Research, McGill-Queen's Press, ISBN 978-0-7735-1144-6
- Nock, A. D. (1929), "(Book Review) Studien zum antiken Synkretismus aus Iran und Griechenland by R. Reitzenstein & H. H. Schaeder", The Journal of Hellenic Studies, 49 (1): 111–116, doi:10.2307/625011, JSTOR 625011
- Sarianidi, V. (1987), "South-West Asia: Migrations, the Aryans and Zoroastrians", International Association for the Study of Cultures of Central Asia Information Bulletin, 13: 44–56
- Shahbazi, A. Shapur (1977), "The 'Traditional Date of Zoroaster' Explained", Bulletin of the School of Oriental and African Studies, 40 (1): 25–35, doi:10.1017/S0041977X00040386, S2CID 161582719
- Schlerath, Bernfried (1977), "Noch einmal Zarathustra", Die Sprache, 23 (2): 127–135
- Schmitt, Rüdiger (2002), "Zoroaster, the name", Encyclopaedia Iranica, New York: Encyclopædia Iranica online
- Sieber, John (July 1973), "An Introduction to the Tractate Zostrianos from Nag Hammadi", Novum Testamentum, 15 (3): 233–240, doi:10.1163/156853673X00079
- Stausberg, Michael (2002), Die Religion Zarathushtras, Vol. I & II [Zoroaster's religion] (in German), Stuttgart: Kohlhammer
- Stausberg, Michael (2004), Die Religion Zarathushtras, Vol. III [Zoroaster's religion] (in German), Stuttgart: Kohlhammer
- Stausberg, Michael (2005), "Zoroaster, as perceived in Western Europe after antiquity", Encyclopaedia Iranica, vol. OT9, New York: Encyclopædia Iranica online
- Stausberg, Michael (2008), "On the State and Prospects of the Study of Zoroastrianism", Numen, 55 (5): 561–600, doi:10.1163/156852708X310536, S2CID 143903349
- Stausberg, Michael; Vevaina, Yuhan Sohrab-Dinshaw; Tessmann, Anna (2015), The Wiley-Blackwell Companion to Zoroastrianism, John Wiley & Sons, ISBN 978-1-4443-3135-6
- Taherzadeh, Adib (1976), The Revelation of Bahá'u'lláh, Volume 1: Baghdad 1853–63, Oxford: George Ronald, ISBN 0-85398-270-8
- Watkins, Alison (2006), "Where Got I That Truth? Psychic Junk in a Modernist Landscape", Writing Junk: Culture, Landscape, Body (Conference Proceedings), Worcester: University College, pp. 3–4
- Werba, Chlodwig (1982), Die arischen Personennamen und ihre Träger bei den Alexanderhistorikern (Studien zur iranischen Anthroponomastik), Vienna: n.p. (Institut für Südasien-, Tibet- und Buddhismuskunde der Universität Wien)
- West, Martin Litchfield (2010), The Hymns of Zoroaster: A New Translation of the Most Ancient Sacred Texts of Iran, I.B.Tauris, ISBN 978-0-85773-156-2
- West, Martin Litchfield (2013), Hellenica: Volume III: Philosophy, Music and Metre, Literary Byways, Varia, OUP Oxford, ISBN 978-0-19-960503-3
- Widengren, Geo (1961), Mani and Manichaeism, London: Weidenfeld and Nicolson, OCLC 640889566
- Zaehner, Robert Charles (1972), Zurvan: A Zoroastrian Dilemma, New York: Biblo and Tannen, ISBN 978-0-8196-0280-0
- Zaehner, Robert Charles (1958), A Comparison of Religions, London: Faber and Faber. Cf. especially Chapter IV: Prophets Outside Israel
