= Index of Zoroastrianism-related articles =

This is an alphabetical list of topics related to Zoroastrianism. This list is not complete, please add more to it as needed.

== 0-9 ==
- -

== A ==
- Ab-Zohr
- Ahuna Vairya
- Ahura Mazda
- Ahura
- Ameretat
- Amesha Spenta
- Angra Mainyu
- Asha
- Avesta
- Avestan alphabet
- Avestan geography
- Avestan

== B ==
- Barashnûm
- Barsom
- Book of Arda Viraf
- Bundahishn

== C ==
- Chihrdad

== D ==
- Daeva
- Dakhma
- Dastur
- Denkard

== E ==
- -

== F ==
- Faravahar
- Fire temple
- Frashokereti
- Fravashi

== G ==
- Gāh
- Gathas

== H ==
- Haurvatat

== I ==
- -

== J ==
- Jamasp Namag

== K ==
- Kerman
- Khordeh Avesta

== L ==
- -

== M ==
- Mahabad
- Maneckji Nusserwanji Dhalla

== N ==
- Navjote

== O ==
- -

== P ==
- Parsi
- Persecution of Zoroastrians

== Q ==
- Qissa-i Sanjan

== R ==
- -

== S ==
- Sad-dar
- Sagdid
- Saoshyant
- Sasan
- Sedreh
- Sepandārmazgān

== T ==
- -

== U ==
- -

== V ==
- Vendidad
- Visperad
- Vohu Manah

== W ==
- -

== X ==
- Xerxes I
- Xwedodah

== Y ==
- Yashts
- Yasna Haptanghaiti
- Yasna
- Yazata
- Yazd

== Z ==
- Zend
- Zoroaster
- Zoroastrian calendar
- Zoroastrian festivals
- Zoroastrian music
- Zoroastrian wedding
- Zoroastrianism and sexual orientation
- Zoroastrianism by Country
- Zoroastrianism in Armenia
- Zoroastrianism in Azerbaijan
- Zoroastrians in Iran
- Zurvanism
