= Yasna (liturgy) =

Most important liturgy of Zoroastrianism

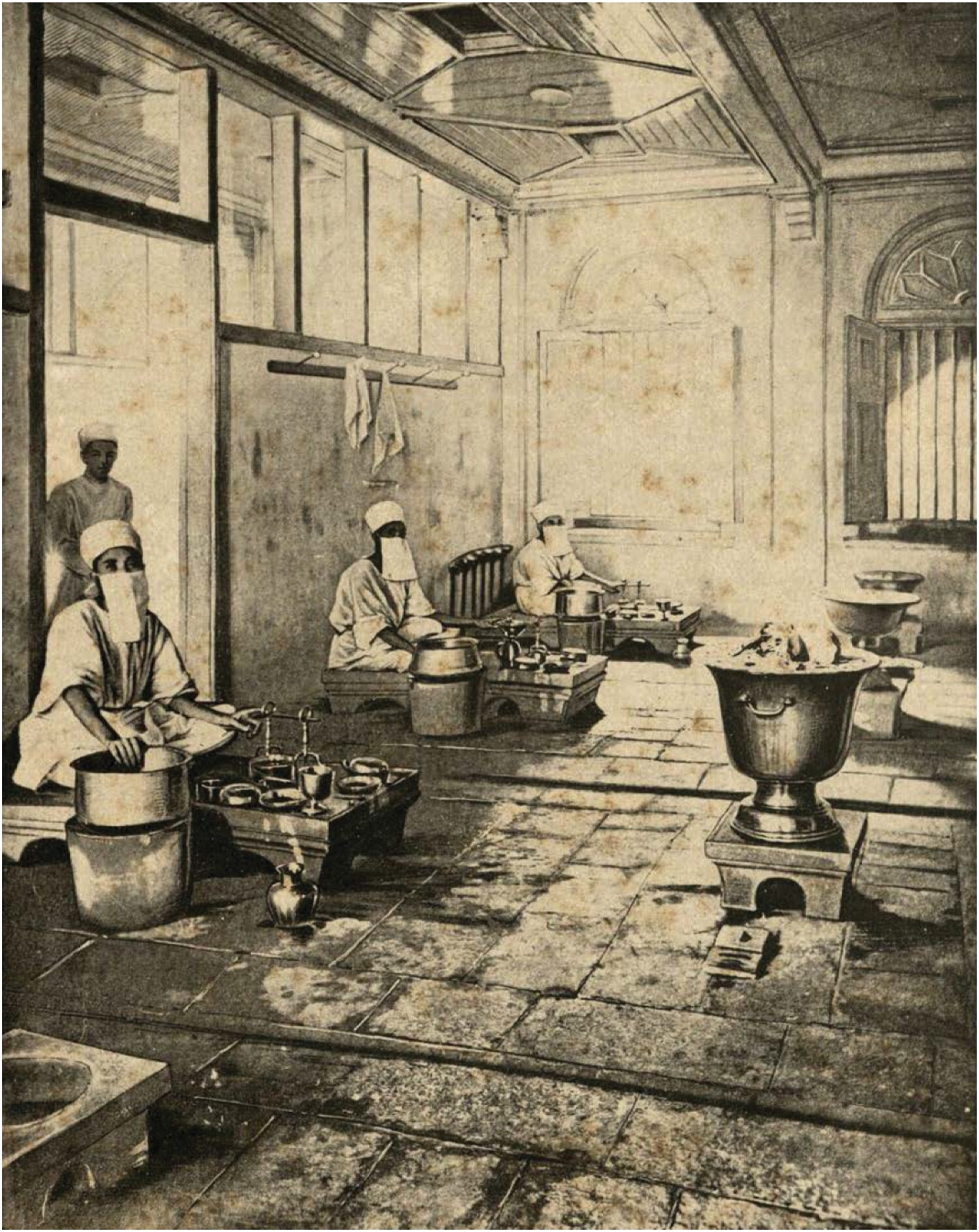
- Zoroastrian priests in the ritual precinct of Maneckji Seth Agiary fire temple in Bombay
- Genre: Long Liturgy
- Date: Havan gah
- Frequency: Daily

The Yasna liturgy is the most important liturgy of Zoroastrianism. It is performed daily during the Havan Gah by reciting the Yasna text. It belongs to and forms the basis of the so-called Long Liturgies.

== Name ==
In the scholarly literature, both the ceremony and the text are called Yasna. To distinguish both, Malandra for example uses capital Yasna for the text and lower case yasna for the ceremony. This distinction is sometimes also used by other authors but not applied universally.

In the Avestan texts, the term Yasna is never used in order to refer the ceremony specifically. Rather, it is a general term for sacrifice or worship. When it is used within the ceremony itself, Hintze has argued that it refers specifically to the Yasna Haptanghaiti. In the Middle Persian Zoroastrian literature, the ceremony is referred to as Yasht. This term is likewise a general word for a religious ceremony.

== Sources ==
The oldest source on Zoroastrian liturgical practice is the Nerangestan, an Avestan text with a lengthy Middle Persian commentary. The Avestan text is, therefore, a witness to the ritual traditions as they were performed during the Avestan period, whereas the commentary reflects the later Sasanian Empire period. More information on the Sasanian era rituals is found in other Middle Persian literature.

Beginning with the 14th century, a number of Iranian liturgical manuscripts are available, whereas Indian liturgical manuscripts are available from the 19th century onward. Descriptions of the ritual practice in India were published by Anklesaria, Modi as well as Kotwal and Boyd. More recently, the Multimedia Yasna (MuYa) project has made a large number of resources available, including an online platform for digitized manuscripts and a fully subtitled and interactive film of the Yasna liturgy.

== Classification ==
Within the Indian Zoroastrian community, the Yasna ceremony is classified as an inner liturgy. This means that it is only performed by priests, which have undergone a particular purification ceremony and within a consecrated place, i.e., the ritual precinct within the fire temple. Inner liturgies are contrasted with the outer ones, which are performed outside the temple and by any priest as well as lay people.

Within modern scholarship, however, Zoroastrian liturgies are classified as either Long Liturgies and Short Liturgies. Long Litugies, which overlap with the inner liturgies, are characterized by a number of internal features. They are structured around the Staota Yesnya, the central ritual act is the so-called parahoama, i.e., the pressing of the Haoma plant, and they contain a sequence of individual litanies.

== History ==
Core elements of the Yasna seem to go back to the common Indo-Iranian history. Moreover, the general arrangement of the Yasna is already mentioned in the Avestan version of the Nerangestan, indicating it was already established during the Avestan period. The more elaborate Middle Persian commentary in the Nerangestan shows that during the Sasanian Empire, the Yasna was already very similar to today. Exceptions are, that the Yasna ceremony was still performed by eight priest, it still included an animal sacrifice and the Barsom was still made from wooden sticks. Based on the instructions in the liturgical manuscripts, only minor changes were introduced during the last centuries.

== Overview ==
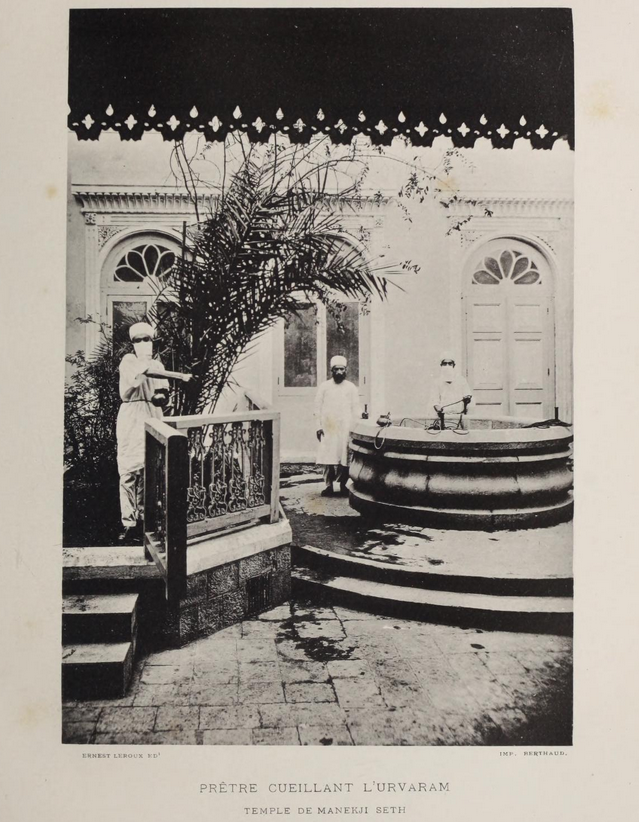
Zoroastrian priest next to the well in the court of the Maneckji Seth Agiary fire temple.

In current practice, the liturgy is performed by two priest; the officiating priest, called zot, and the assisting priest, called raspig. Most of the recitations and rituals are performed by the zot, whereas the raspig joins the recitation on specific occasions, while otherwise tending the fire.

The performance of the ceremony takes place within a small rectangular enclosures, typically only a few square meters wide, called pawi, yazishna-gah, or urvisgah. They are demarcated by furrows on the floor and are situated in a dedicated ritual precinct, attached to but separated from the main hall of the fire temple. This ritual precinct is called dar-i-mihr. It is restricted to priest and the congregation does not enter it. The ritual precinct has a direct access to the courtyard, which supplies a number of items used for the ceremony. This includes a well for the water, a date palm, a pomegranate tree as well as often a she goat for the milk.

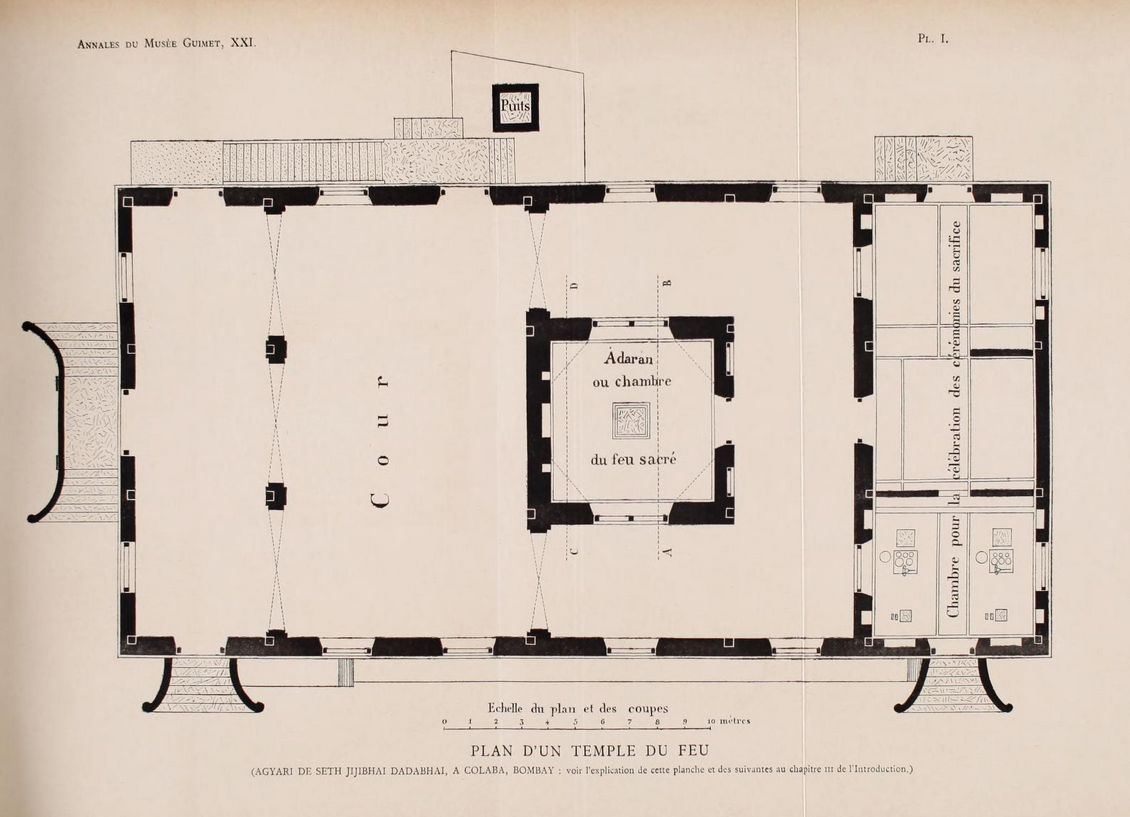
Layout of a Zoroastrian fire temple with the dar-i-mihr (ritual precinct) on the right and two pawi indicated on the lower right.

The ceremony is performed daily. It takes place during the so called Havan Gah, i.e., the period of the day around sun rise. Its purpose has consequently been interpreted "to reproduce the new day after a period of darkness." On average, the performance lasts two and a half hours.

For Zoroastrian ceremonies, a number of consumables and utensils, called alat, are necessary. Consumables comprise the zōhr, i.e., the consecrated water drawn from the well in the courtyard; the haoma, imported from Iran; sandalwood; and frankincense. Utensils comprise a ladle and tongs to handle the fire; vase-like containers for the water and goat milk; as well as a mortar, a pestle, cups, bowls, a knife, and two metal stands. The cups contain zōhr, goat's milk, and hauma mixed with pomegranate twigs, whereas the bowls contain the parahōm, pomegranate twigs, the drōn, and goat's milk. The two metal stands hold the Barsom.

== Structure ==
The Yasna liturgy begins with a preparatory ceremony, called Paragna, which is then followed by the Yasna proper. The Yasna itself is often presented as a concentric structure having several layers. The outermost layer is centered around the Staota Yesnya, which contains all the linguistically oldest texts. The parts comprised therein varies but Y 27-59 are always included. The Staota Yesnya is flanked by the introduction and ending of the ceremony, which are in Young Avestan. They are therefore seen as later additions. The next layer, now inside the Staota Yesnya, is bookended by the four Gathic manthras, the most important Zoroastrian prayers. They enclose the five Gathas, the most important liturgical texts of the Zoroastrian tradition. Enclosed by the Gathas, and therefore at the center of the whole liturgy, is the Yasna Haptanghaiti the Yasna par excellence. Until Sasanian times, it was still accompanied by an animal sacrifice.

=== Preparation - Paragna ===
Before the Yasna proper begins, a number of preparatory steps are necessary. This is done in a dedicated ceremony called Paragna, a name meaning before the Yasna. There are a number of steps involved. First, the ritual instruments have to be purified and consecrated. Then, the consumables are acquired, i.e., the milk from the she goat, date palm leaves, pomegranate twigs and water from the well. Next comes the washing and tying of the barsom. Finally comes the preparation of the parahom , i.e., the haoma drink, which is consumed by the zot during the ceremony. However, the drōn, i.e., the unleavened wheat bread used as an offering, is prepared beforehand.

=== Intro (Y 1-26) ===
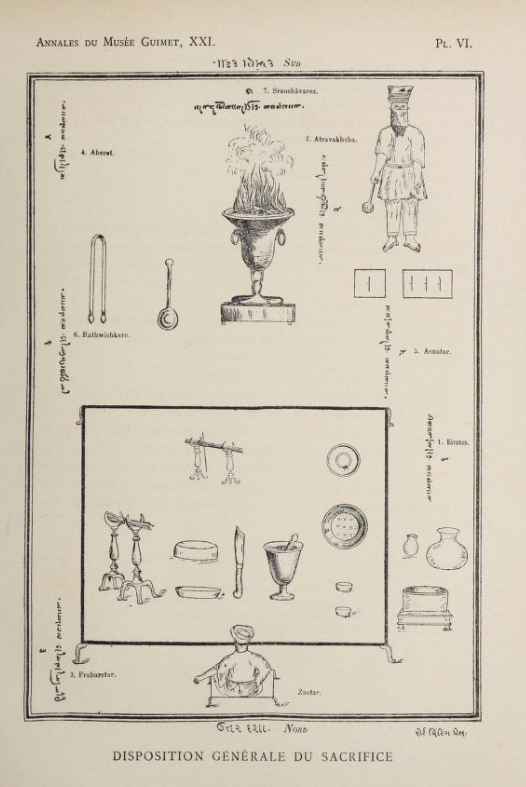
Arrangement of the pawi during the Yasna. The zot sits in front of the ritual table with the alat. The raspig (atravakhsha) stands next to the fire.

The Yasna proper only begins with the recitation of the Yasna text. The first major part is comprised by chapters 1-26. It consists of litanies to Ahura Mazda (Y 1-8), the Amesha Spentas (Y 14-18) and the ratus of time (Y 22-26) as well as the litany to hauma (Y 9-11), the Fravarane (Y 12) and the Bagan yasht, a commentary on the three following mathras.

Opening of the Yasna
Yasna	Name	Ritual actions
1		
2	Barsom Yasht	Placement of the barsom
3-8	Srosh Dron	Consumation of the dron
9-11	Hom Stom	Consumation of the parahom
12	Fravarane	
13		
14-18		
19-21	Bagan yasht	
22-26	Hōmāst	Second preparation of the parahom

Only when the Yasna begins, does the zot enter the pawi and joins the raspi. Before the recitation of the first chapter, he moistens the barsom, a ritual, which goes back to a time, when it was still made out of twigs that needed to be kept fresh. This procedure is repeated at the beginning of each chapter of Yasna. During the recitation of the Barsom Yasht (Y 2), the zot places 21 of the 23 barsom twigs on the stand. During the recitation of the Srosh Dron, the sacred bread is consecrated and eventually eaten by the priest. The Srosh Dron is largely identical to the Dron Yasht, a ceremony that can be celebrated independently of the Yasna. During the following Hom Stom (Y 9-11) the priest praises the beneficial aspects of hauma before eventually consuming the drink. Through this act, he gains the ability to perform the central part of the Yasna, the Staota Yesnya. During the Homast, a second pressing of the hauma is performed. We also find an enumeration of ritual objects, which still contains a mention of the mortar and pestle being made of stone in addition to the brass ones actually used in the ritual. This artifact suggest that the pressing of the hauma was originally done with stone tools.

=== Main part (Y 27-58) ===
The central part of the ceremony is comprised by the Staota Yesnya. There is no consensus on the exact parts which belong to it, but Y 27-58 are always included. This part contains all the Old Avestan texts and it is consequently seen as the oldest portion of the liturgy. Its overall structure may possibly go back to Zarathustra himself.

Contents of the Staota Yesnya in the Yasna
Yasna	Name	Ritual actions
27	First three manthras	
28-34	Ahunavaiti Gatha	Second preparation of the parahom
35-41	Yasna Haptanghaiti	
42	Appendix to the Yasna Haptanhaiti	
43-46	Ushtavait Gatha	
47-50	Spenta Mainyu Gatha	
51	Vohu Khshathra Gatha	
52	Hymn to Ashi	
53	Vahishto Ishti Gatha	
54	Fourth manthra	
55	Praise to the Gathas	
56	Prelude to the Srosh Yasht	
57	Srosh Yasht	
58	Fshusho manthra	

Overall, the central part of the Yasna sees less ritual activity. The zot continues to moisten the barsom while performing most of the recitation. He is only occasionally joined by the raspi, who otherwise feeds the fire with fracincense. In particular during the recitation of the Ahunavaiti Gatha, the zot simply continues to prepare the parahom, while rhythmically ringing the mortar. During the Yasna Haptanghaiti, the sacrificial fire becomes identified with Ahura Mazda.

=== Closing (Y59-72) ===
Like the opening, the closing of the Yasna consists of several litanies in Young Avestan. It starts with chapter 59, in which the zot asks for a reward from Ahura Mazda for his performance. Yasna 62 is the Ataxsh Nyayishn a Zoroastrian prayer dedicated to the fire. Like some of the other litanies, it can also be performed outside the Yasna.

Closing of the Yasna
Yasna	Name	Ritual actions
59		
60	Dahma Afritish	
61		
62	Ataxsh Nyayishn	
63-69		Ab-Zohr
70-72		

In Yasna 59, the raspi leaves his places and moves closer to the zot. Both then engage in a short conversation extolling their repspective duties. Yasna 63-69 contains the final rite of the Yasna; the Ab-Zohr or offering to the waters. During this part, the parahom is equally divided between a number of vessels. The recitation ends with chapter 72 after which the zot raises from his seat and exchanges a kiss with the raspig called hamazor. After this, both priests leave the pawi and return the parahom to the well from which the water was initially drawn.

== Editions ==
The classic editions of the Yasna by Westergaard and Geldner did edit the text according to the exegetical manuscripts, which do not include the ritual instructions. This has changed recently with a number of editions having been published with a focus on the liturgical aspects. The first such edition was the multi-volume edition of Kellens. Starting in 2021, an ongoing multi-volume, multi-author edition of the Yasna is being published at SOAS as part of the Multimedia Yasna (MuYa) project led by Hintze.
