= Yasht i Visperad abag Videvdad =

Zoroastrian religious ceremony

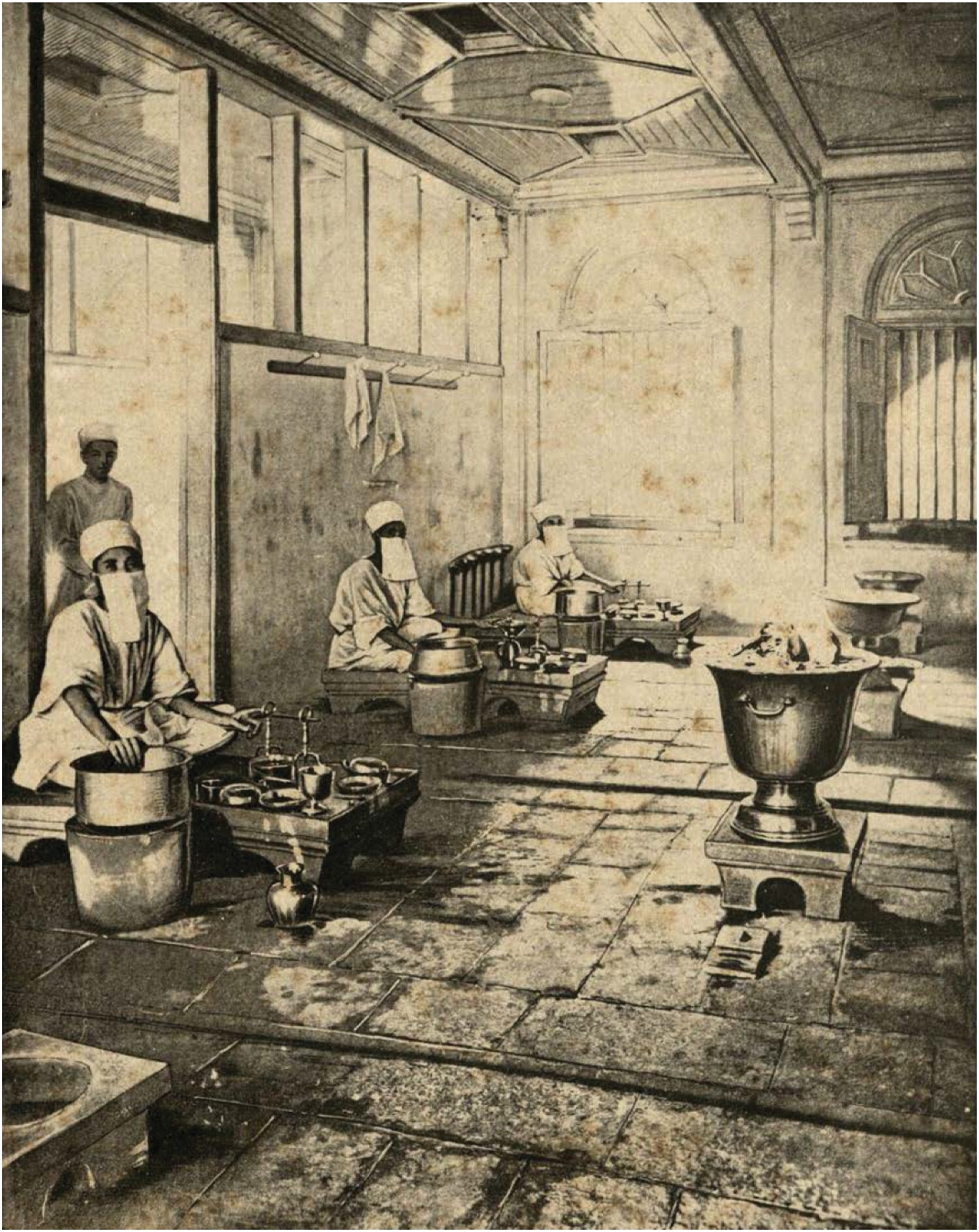
- Zoroastrian priests in the ritual precinct of Maneckji Seth Agiary fire temple in Bombay
- Genre: Long Liturgy
- Date: Ushahin gah
- Frequency: Occasion dependent

The Yasht i Visperad abag Videvdad, or simply Videvdad, is an important Zoroastrian liturgy. It is one of the main variants of the Long Liturgy and consists of the Yasht i Visperad into which the text of the Videvdad is intercalated.

== Name ==
In the scholarly literature, there is no clear distinction between the text and the ceremony in which this text is used. Both are variously referred to as Videvdad, Vendidad or Juddewdad, all of which are assumed to derive from an unattested Avestan 𐬬𐬍𐬛𐬀𐬉𐬬𐬋𐬛𐬁𐬙𐬀, (vī-daēvō-dāta). In the Zoroastrian manuscripts, however, the ceremony is referred to in Middle Persian as Yasht Visperad Juddevdad or Yasht i Visperad abag Videvdad. This means that it is a Yasht i Visperad ceremony in which the text of the Videvdad is used.

== Sources ==
Like all variants of the Long Liturgy, the Videvdad liturgy consists of its core text and a number of variations depending on the details of the performance. The text itself has been transmitted in two types of manuscripts: exegetical and liturgical ones. Of those two, only the liturgical manuscripts present the core text as it is performed in the liturgy. They are called Sade, pure, since they do not contain a translation. Instead, they contain liturgical instructions, describing the priestly rituals performed during the ceremony. In 2012, a comprehensive list of all available Videwdad manuscripts was provided by Andrés-Toledo and Cantera. In addition, the Rivayats, a series of epistles from the 15th - 17th century, provide information on the historical performance of the liturgy.

== Text ==
The core of the Videvdad ceremony consists of a Visperad ceremony into which the text of the Vendidad is intercalated during its central part, i.e., the Staota Yesnya. Based on the descriptions in the Denkard, the Vendidad can be identified with the Juddewdad nask (Middle Persian for Videvdad), one of the volumes of the Sasanian Avesta. While most volumes of the Sasanian Avesta are either fragementary or lost, the Juddewdad is considered to be the only one which has survived completely.

== History ==
The classic view is that the Videvdad liturgy was created relatively late by simply expanding the Visperad liturgy through inserting the chapters of the Vendidad. Hintze for example states that this intercalation is a purely mechanical process, without any regards for the actual content of the texts into which it is inserted. Moreover, Malandra states that the ceremony was a late "innovation of the Islamic period".

This opinion has been challenged more recently. On the one hand, Skjaervo has argued that the corruptions of the Vendidad are not necessarily the result of a late redaction, but occurred during the process of oral transmission. In addition, he demonstrated that at least the beginning and end of the Vendidad shows a connection to the Staota Yesnya into which they are inserted. In 2016, Cantera expanded these results and presents how also the overall structure of the text may correspond to the Staota Yesnya. This indicates that they were indeed composed as insertions. Furthermore, Cantera has shown that the performative variations of the Videvdad liturgy are in proper Avestan, indicating that the Videvdad ritual was created at a time when Avestan was still a living language.

Textual evidence for performance of the liturgy is provided by the liturgical manuscripts. They demonstrate how it was performed in India and Iran from the 14th century onwards. Based on these mansucripts, and the liturgical instructions therein, it is clear that only minor variations have occurred in the last centuries. The 20th century, however, has shown a marked decline. In Iran, the liturgy has been completely discontinued and it is currently only performed in India.

== Liturgical structure ==
The Videvdad liturgy is one of the variants of the Long Liturgy, the main ritual of Zoroastrianism. Among its variants, the Videvdad liturgy is classified as an intercalation ceremony. This means it is based on the Visperad liturgy into which a number of chapters, called fragards, are intercalated into the central part of the liturgy. In case of the Videvdad liturgy, these intercalations are the 22 fragards of the Vendidad text.

Structure of the Videvdad liturgy
	Yasna	Visperad	Videvdad
	Y 27.6		
		Vr 12	
	Y 27.7-27.13		
			V 1-4
Ahunavaiti Gatha I	Y 28-30		
		Vr 13	
			V 5-6
Ahunavaiti Gatha II	Y 32 - 34		
		Vr 14	
			V 7-8
		Vr 15	
Yasna Haptanhaiti	Y 35-42		
		Vr 16-17	
			V 9-10
Ushtavait Gatha	Y 43-46		
		Vr 18	
			V 11-12
Spenta Mainyu Gatha	Y 47-50		
		Vr 19	
			V 13-14
Vohu Khshathra Gatha	Y 51		
		Vr 20	
			V 15-16
2. Yasna Haptanhaiti		Vr 21-22	
			V 17-18
Vahishto Ishti Gatha	Y 52-53		
		Vr 23	
			V 19-20
Airiieman ishya manthra	Y 54		
		Vr 24	
			V 21-22
	Y 55-72		

In addition to these substantial textual changes, the Videvdad liturgy is also characterized by a number of minor variations, which announce the performative details of the liturgy. During a performance of a Long Liturgy like the Videvdad, time is specified according to the period of the day as well as the day and month. Since the Videvdad is always performed from midnight to dawn, the period of the day is always ushanin. Furthermore, since it is an occasion-specific liturgy, it may be performed on any day and month, which is then indicated during performance. Another performative variatation is the dedication or shnuman. During the Videvdad, the most typical dedication is to Sraosha, due to his connection with repelling the daevas. The Iranian manuscripts also contain dedications to Ahura Mazda, whereas the Revayats specify that, in principal, a dedication to any Yazata is possible. Finally, there is a so called celebatory marker which announces that the Venidad belongs to the so called dadig, i.e., the group of legal texts in the Sasanian Avesta.

== Liturgical practice ==
The name of the Videvdad liturgy indicates that it is directed against the daevas and their polluting influence in the world. It is held during ushanin, i.e., the period of the day lasting from midnight to dawn, when their influence is assumed to be the strongest. The performance of the liturgy lasts serveral hours and is performed by two priests typically within a fire temple. Due to its length, the Videvdad liturgy is the only liturgy in which the use of a written aid, namely the Vendidad text, is allowed. Given that its main aim is to repel the influce of pollution, it is performed at mainly three occasion: the Barashnom, honouring the dead, and the establishment of an Atash Behram.

=== Barashnom ===
The major Zoroastrian purification ritual is the Barashnom, also known as the Barashnom of the nine nights. Its purpose is to cleanse a person of the corrupting influence of the nasu (the Zoroastrian daeva of corpes), after coming into contact with dead matter. During this ritual, the dedication in the Videvdad is to Sraosha since this divinity is connected with casting out the daevas.

=== Honouring the dead ===
In the Rivayats, two different occasions are described for a celebration of the Videvdad liturgy relating to the dead. First, a series of three ceremonies may be performed for a recently deceased in order to guide their soul into the afterlife. A second occasion for the celebration of the Videvdad is the founding of a dakhma, i.e., a tower of silence used for the excarnation of dead people. Like in the Barashnom ceremony, the dedication during these rituals is to Sraosha.

=== Establishment of the Atash Behram ===
The third occasion on which a Videvdad may be celebrated is the establishment of a Atash Behram, i.e., the highest level fire in Zoroastrianism. The details of this procedure vary in the literature. For instance in the Wizīrgard ī Dēnīg, a series of several Yasna and Videvdad liturgies is described for each of the 91 collected fires. Modi, however, describes a series of Yasna and Videvdad liturgies for a number days.
