= Dron Yasht =

Zoroastrian religious ceremony

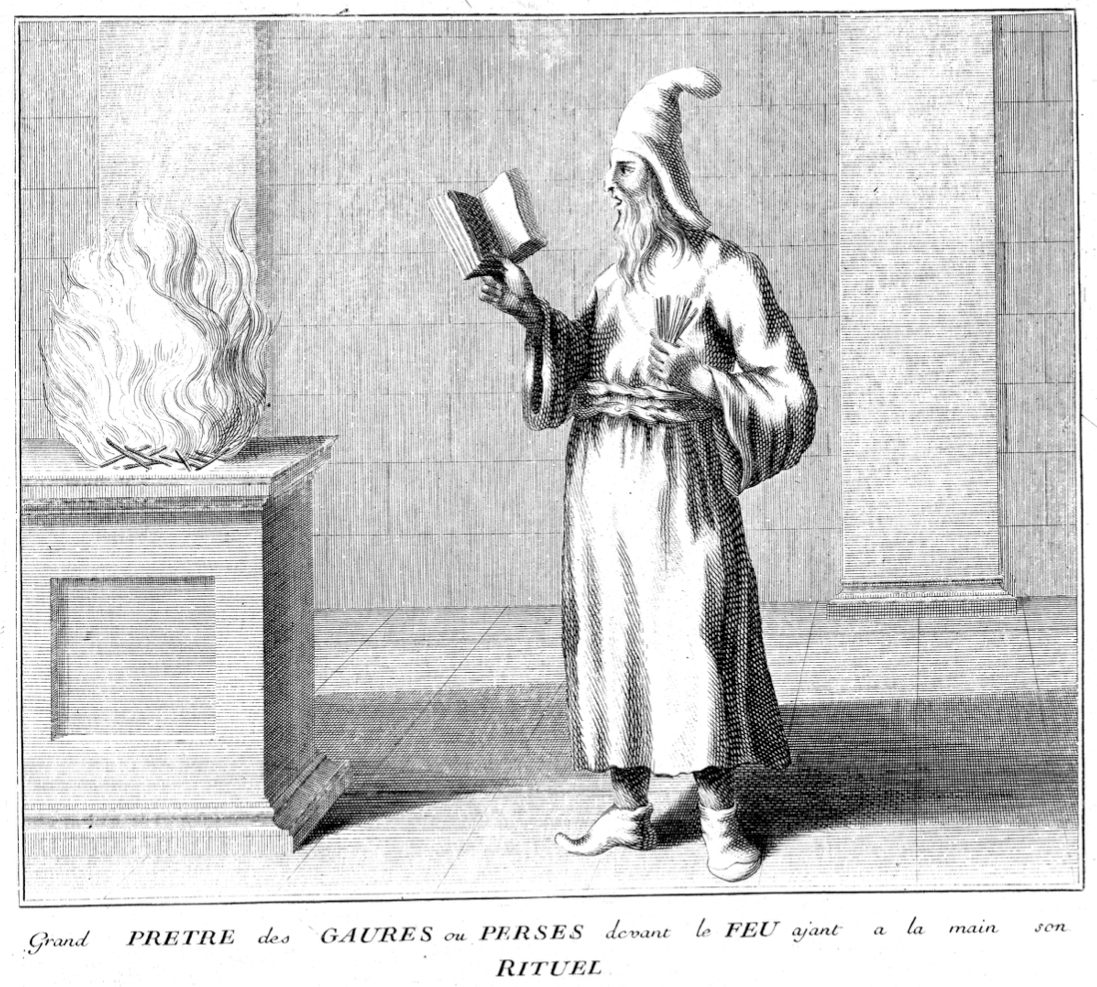
- Safavid era Zoroastrian priest, holding Barsom twigs while performing a ceremony
- Date: Any gah
- Frequency: Occasion dependent

The Dron Yasht or Baj-dharna is a Zoroastrian ceremony, which can be celebrated at a number of different occasions. A variant is celebrated during the Long Liturgies, like the Yasna, where it is known as Srosh Dron. It also forms the basis of several extended ceremonies like the Dron Frawardin Yasht.

== Name ==
The name of the ceremony is used inconsistently in the sources as well as living practice. In the Middle Persian literature, it is called Dron Yasht, Yasht i Dron, Dron yashtan, Gosodag yashtan, or simply Dron. Here, dron is a Middle Persian word meaning consecrated bread, whereas yasht is a general term for a Zoroastrian ceremony. On the other hand, in current Parsi practice, the ceremony is called Baj-dharna or sometimes simply Baj. Here, baj is a term often used in the Parsi community for prayers in general, whereas dharna, is a Gujarati word for holding or taking.

== Overview ==
=== Classification ===
The classification of the Dron Yasht within the Zoroastrian liturgical system is debated. Within the Parsi community, it is generally classified as an Inner Liturgy, meaning that it is performed within a ritually consecrated space called pavi. This makes it close to the Long Liturgies, like the Yasna liturgy or the Yasht i Visperad. Within modern scholarship, however, it is usually classified as a Short Liturgy similar to the texts contained in the Khordeh Avesta.

=== Purpose ===
The Dron Yasht is performed comparably often and at a variety of occasions. It serves as a daily prayer for the consecration of the dron (sacred bread), which itself is necessary for the High Liturgies like the Yasna, Visperad and Vendidad, but also for rituals for the commemoration of the deceased. It is particularly used within death rituals to help the salvation of the deceased. Performing it lasts ca. 20 – 30 minutes.

== Liturgy ==
=== Main requisites ===
During the ceremony, a number of consumbales are needed. These are the eponymous dron, an animal product called gosodag, a plant product called urvar and incense called esm-boy. The dron is a small, round and unleavened flatbread, made from wheat flour and prepared by the priest with ritual purity. The gosodag is typically butter and the urvar may be represented by a pomegranate, a date fruit, or raisins. In addition, the ceremony needs a knife and a number of metallic cups, trays and pots to hold water as well as the above items.

=== Text ===
The text recited during the ceremony consists of a core around which variable parts are added depending o the specific variant which is celebrated. The core consists of an introductory portion, where a prayer in Pazend is performed, and a main portion in Avestan. This main part is largely identical to the text used in the Srosh Dron (see below), which is one of the litanies performed during the Long Liturgy. On the other hand, the variable parts.consist of the different dedications, which are made depending on the context and purpose of the ceremony.

=== Structure ===
As an Inner Ritual, the Dron Yasht is alwas performed inside the ritual enclosure called pavi. The preparations includes cleaning of the props and the preparation of the pavi. The ritual itself starts with the recitation of the Pazend prayer, in which the purpose of the ceremony is declared. The main part (also known as Srosh Dron) starts with the purification of the Barsom sticks (tāe). During the recitation of the text, the priest glances several times at the comsumables (gosodag, water, fruit) and exchanges the dron. This is followed by the chashni (ritual tasting) and eventual consumption of the bread. The priest concludes the ritual with the personal affirmation "I am Zarathustra" and the use of firewood and incense.

== Other uses ==
The Zoroastrian ritual system is highly modular and smaller components can often appear in slightly modified form in different contexts. The Dron Yasht is no exception to this. According to the information provided in the Nerangestan, it may have been used during Sasanian Empire times in a large number of different rituals. Even today, some important variantions do still exist.

=== Srosh Dron ===
The Srosh Dron is the name of a litany which is found in Yasna 3-8. It is named after Sraosha, although the exact reasons for this are unclear. Due to the strong textual and ritual similarities, this litany is usually seen as a variant of the Dron Yasht. Regardless, there are a number of differences between the two. They have been analyzed by Redard.

=== Dron Frawardin Yasht ===
Andrés-Toledo has analyzed a number of manuscript, which describe a ceremony he calls Dron Frawardin Yasht. This ceremony is a variant of the Farokhshi and consists of a Dron Yasht followed by a celebration of a Frawardin Yasht and a closing prayer. According to his analysis, this Dron Frawardin Yasht is celebrated during the Frawardigan days at the end of the year as well as the monthly and annual anniversaries of the dead.

== Editions ==
The Dron Yasht itself was not part of the seminal edition of the Avestan corpus published by Geldner. Its basic text was however, made available through editions of the Yasna, since the Srosh Dron, i.e., Y 3-8, shares the core text. An edition dedicated the Dron Yasht itself was published by Karanjia in 2010. It contained the text, a translation and commentary. In 2021, Redard published an edition dedicated specifically to the Srosh Dron. It included a translation of the text and a critical commentary.
