= Yasht i Gahan =

Zoroastrian religious ceremony

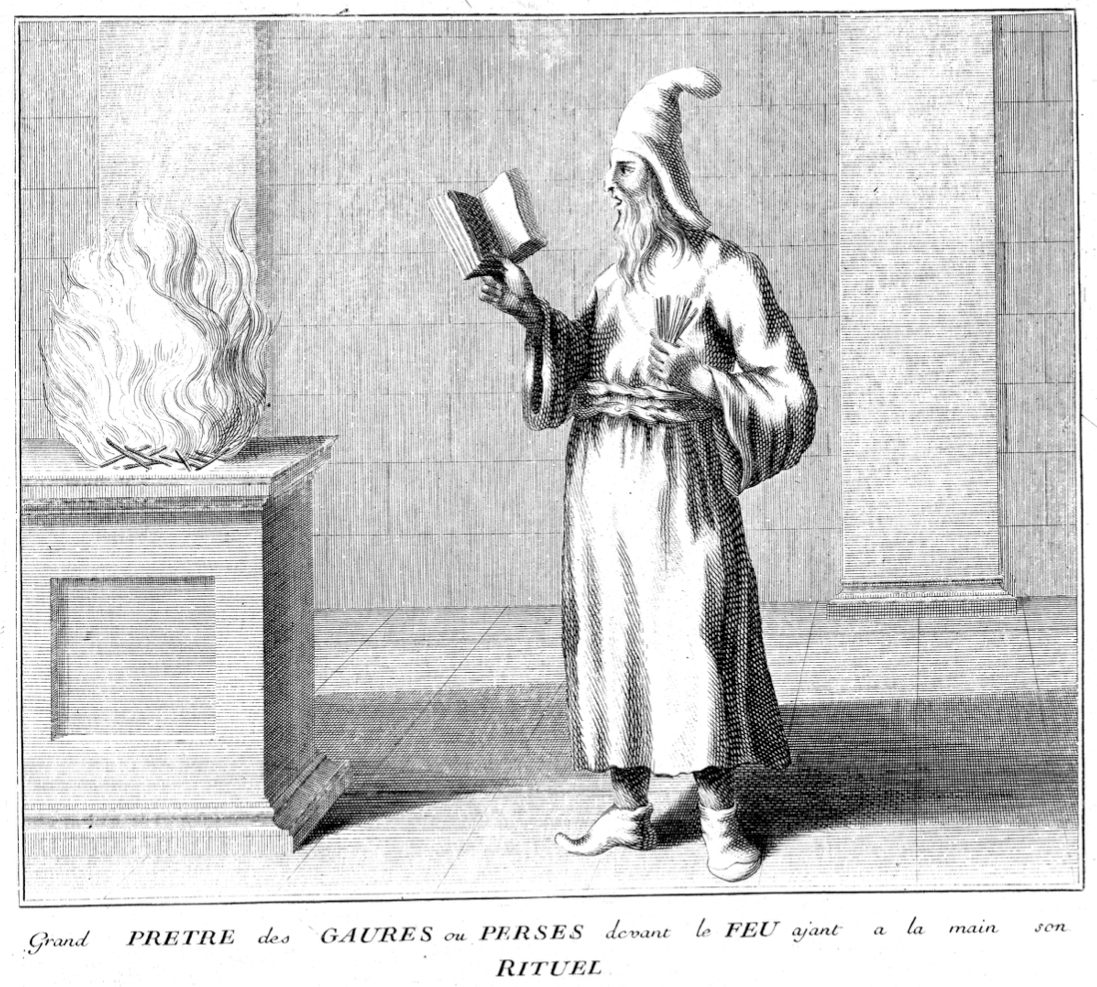
- Safavid era Zoroastrian priest, holding Barsom twigs while performing a ceremony
- Genre: Funeral rite
- Date: Occasion dependent

The Yasht i Gahan or Gah Sarna, is an important Zoroastrian funeral ceremony. Its purpose is to guide the soul to the afterlife. It is performed by two priest, who chant the seven hymns of the Ahunavaiti Gatha over the body of the deceased.

== Name ==
The ceremony is known as Yasht i Gahan or Yasht Gahan in Iran, or Gah Sarna in India. Here yasht is the Middle Persian term for a ceremony of sacrificial worship and gahan refers to the Gathas. The term, therefore, means the Ceremony of the Gathas. This plural use in at odds with the ritual practice, where only one of the Gathas, namely the Ahunavaiti Gatha is celebrated. In contrast, the term Gah Sarna consists of the singular gah, i.e., Gatha, and sarna, the Gujarati form of Modern Persian saraidan, itself derived from Middle Persian srayishna, singing. It, therefore, means Singing the Gatha.

== Sources ==
The Yasht i Gahan is described in a number of sources. The oldest source containing a description of the ceremony is the Revayat of Behdin Jasa from 1515, whereas the Revayat of Kamdin Shapur from 1559 contains the full text. In addition, the text is extant in a number of liturgical manuscripts starting in the 17th century. A list of all manuscripts containing the Yasht i Gahan is presented by König. Modi describes the ritual in a dedicated essay and within the context of Zoroastriani funary rites.

== Ceremony ==
The ceremony is performed by two priests. It begins with the Padyab-Kusti, i.e., the ritual fastening of the Kushti. The priests then enter the room of the deceased and begin performing the first half the Ahunavaiti Gatha. Then, the corpse is lifted up and the priests the continue to chant the Ahunavaiti Gatha, while carrying the corpse to the daxma. This practice may be derived from the Vendidad, where the Gathas are prescribed as repelling the polluting influcene of Nasu, the daeva of dead matter.
