= Sanjana (surname) =

Sanjana is a Parsi surname. Notable people with the surname include:

- Darab Dastur Peshotan Sanjana (1857–1931), Indian scholar and priest
- Dastur Peshotan Behramji Sanjana (1829–1898), Indian scholar and Zoroastrian head-priest
- Jahangir Edalji Sanjana (1880–1964), Gujarati literary critic and professor
- Sandhya Sanjana, Indian singer

== See also ==
- Sanjana, an unrelated given name
