= Sudgar nask =

Zoroastrian religious literature

The Sudgar nask is the first nask (volume) of the Sasanian Avesta. Like most other nasks, it is no longer extant, but its content can be reconstructed from references in later Pahlavi writings and the parts still contained in the extant Avesta.

== Sources ==
The 8th book of the Denkard, a 9th-10th century compendium of Zoroastrianism, as well as a number of Rivayats, a series of epistles from the 15th - 17th century, list its content. In addition the 9th book of the Denkard provides a lengthy description its content. As a result, its original form can be reconstructed with some degree of certainty.

== Name ==
The work is called Studgar and Istudgar in the Rivayats. Both are considered corruptions of Sudgar. Its name has been interpreted as meaning benefit-making. There is no consensus on a possible connection between this name and its content. For example, Vevaina has opined that it is derived from its eschatological content.

== Structure ==
The Sasanian Avesta was organized into 21 nasks, i.e., volumes, with each nask being in turn divided into several chapters. These 21 nasks are grouped into 3 divisions; the Gāhānīg (Gathic nasks), Hada Mānsrīg (manthras connected with the ritual), and Dādīg (legal nasks). Within this structure, the Sudgar nask was the first nask, but only the second of the Gathic nasks, to which it belonged. This discrepancy was due to the Stōd-yasn being placed as the first nask of the Gathic group, while being overall the last of the 21 nasks of the Sasanian Avesta. It has been speculated that this arrangement was meant to convey the cyclical and interconnected nature of the different nasks within the Sasanian Avesta.

== Content ==
The Sudgar nask was divided into 22 fargards (chapters) and consisted, according to West's estimate, of ca. 4.700 words of Avestan text accompanied by ca. 10.500 word commentary in Pahlavi. It covered the central part of the Staota Yesnya, starting with the Ahuna Vairya manthra (fargard 1), followed by the Ashem Vohu manthra (fargard 2), the Yenghe hatam manthra (fargard 3), the Ahunavaiti Gatha (fargard 4-10), the Yasna Haptanghaiti (fargard 11), the Ushtavaiti Gatha (fargard 12-15), the Spenta Mainyu Gatha (fargard 16-19), the Vohu Khshathra Gatha (fargard 20), the Vahishto Ishti Gatha (fargard 21) and finally the Airyaman ishya manthra (fargard 22).

== Translations ==
A complete translations of the summary of the Sudgar nask was provided by Edward William West published in 1892 as Volume 37 of the Sacred Books of the East series by Max Müller. Between 1874 and 1926, Dastur Peshotan Behramji Sanjana and his son Dastur Darab Peshotan Sanjana published an edition of the Denkard in 19 volumes in Gujarati. Volume 17 of this edition covers Book 9 of the Denkard and an English translation was provided by Ratanshah Erachshah Kohiyar. More recently in 2024, Vevaina published a new critical edition of Denkard book 9 with a particular focus on the Sudgar nask.
