= Bag nask =

Zoroastrian religious literature

The Bag nask is the third nask (volume) of the Sasanian Avesta. The work is no longer extant, but its content can be reconstructed from lengthy references in Book 9 of the Denkard and the parts still contained in Yasna 19–21.

== Sources ==
Book 8 of the Denkard, a 9th-10th century compendium of Zoroastrianism, as well as a number of Rivayats, a series of epistles from the 15th - 17th century, list the content of the Bag nask. In addition Book 9 of the Denkard provides a lengthy description its content.

== Name ==
There is some confusion about the name of the Bag nask. On the one hand, the parts of the nask which are still extant as Yasna 19-21 are called Bagan Yasht. However, the name is also applied to the Bagan yasht; the 14. nask of the Sasanian Avesta. The latter seems to have contained a number of Yashts, in particular Yt. 5–19.

According to Skjaervo, the Middle Persian bagān of nask 14 is the plural of bag, from Avestan bag. On the other hand, the Bagan of Yasna 19-21 is probably derived from baγąm found in the three Gathic manthras, namely the Ahuna Vairya, the Ashem Vohu and the Yenghe hatam. This term is usually translated as piece.

== In the Sasanian Avesta ==
The Sasanian Avesta was organized into 21 nasks, i.e., volumes, with each nask being in turn divided into several chapters. These 21 nasks are grouped into 3 divisions; the Gāhānīg (Gathic nasks), Hada Mānsrīg (manthras connected with the ritual), and Dādīg (legal nasks), and within this scheme, the Bag nask was part of the Gāhānīg division. Like the Sudgar and the Warshtmansr nask, the Bag nask was divided into 22 fragards (sections). Edward William West estimates, that the Bag nask consisted of ca. 9.500 words of Avestan text accompanied by ca. 21.200 words of commentary in Pahlavi.

== Content ==
The Bag nask shows a number of similarities with the Sudgar nask and the Warshtmansr nask, such that they all contained commentaries on the Staota Yesnia, in particular the Gathas. The first three fragards are still extant in Yasna 19–21. These parts are called Bagan yasht, which is possibly due to its connection with Bag nask and should not be confused with the Bagan yasht (see above). These fragards contain commentaries on the Ahuna Vairya, the Ashem Vohu and the Yenghe hatam manthra. The rest is now lost, but according to Book 9 of the Denkard, these fragards contained commentaries on the Gathas and the Airyaman ishya manthra.
