= Fravarane =

Zoroastrian religious text

The Fravarane is the name of an Avestan text appearing in two different contexts. First, the Fravarane appears in Yasna 12, which is often seen as a declaration of faith similar to the Christian Credo. Second, the Fravarane appears in a textual unit, which is used as an ritual opener for different Zoroastrian ceremonies.

== The Fravarane proper ==
The name of the text is derived from the first word 𐬟𐬭𐬁𐬬𐬀𐬭𐬁𐬥𐬆. This word has been variously transliterated from Avestan script into a Latin-based script as fravarane, fravarânê, fravarānē or frauuarānē. It is derived from Avestan "var-", "to make a choice" and has been translated into English as "I declare", "I confess" or "I make the choice".

Text
𐬟𐬭𐬁𐬬𐬀𐬭𐬁𐬥𐬆 𐬨𐬀𐬰𐬛𐬀𐬫𐬀𐬯𐬥𐬊 𐬰𐬀𐬭𐬀𐬚𐬎𐬱𐬙𐬭𐬌𐬱
𐬬𐬍𐬛𐬀𐬉𐬬𐬊 𐬀𐬵𐬎𐬭𐬀.𐬙𐬒𐬀𐬉𐬱𐬊

Transliteration
fravarānē mazdayasnô zaraϑuštriš
vīdaēvō ahura.t̰kaēšō

Translation:
I made the choice of making a sacrifice to Mazda in the way Zarathustra did,
so that I repel the daeuua and act according to the teaching of Ahura.

— Fravarane (translated by Alberto Cantera)

This text is the Fravarane proper and it is found in many different ritual or devotional texts of the Avesta, where it often serves as an introduction to the whole text or a subsection of it. One the of the most important texts is the Yasna and modern scholarship, therefore, uses the chapter and verse notation established by Geldner's edition of the Avesta to reference the Fravarane.

== Language ==
The Avestan texts fall into two categories: a more archaic variant, called Old Avestan, and a linguistically later variant, called Young Avestan. The Fravarane, however, belongs to a small group of texts, whose linguistical affiliation is elusive. According to Hoffmann and Forssman, this variant is called "Pseudo Old Avestan", indicating it to be a Young Avestan composition which was aligned with Old Avestan features. On the other hand, Boyce assumes that it was originally very old but evolved along with the other Young Avestan texts. Finally, scholars like Cantera and Redard have characterized them as "Middle Avestan".

== The Fravarane as a Zoroastrian credo (Yasna 12) ==
Fravarane
- The so called Zoroastrian credo in Darmesteter's French translation of the Avesta

Information
- Religion: Zoroastrianism
- Language: Avestan
- Period: Avestan period
- Verses: 8

The text of Yasna 12 is often seen as a declaration of faith similar to the Christian credo. Within this interpretation, its recital during the liturgy would therefore serve to establish the personal belief of the faithful in the core concepts of the faith. It has been speculated that the original use of this text was that of an "oath which was required of someone being received into the faith".

I drive the Daevas hence;
I confess as a Mazda-worshipper of the order of Zarathustra,
estranged from the Daevas, devoted to the lore of the Lord,
a praiser of the Bountiful Immortals;
and to Ahura Mazda, the good and endowed with good possessions,
I attribute all things good,
to the holy One, the resplendent, to the glorious,
whose are all things whatsoever which are good;
whose is the Kine, whose is Asha,
whose are the stars, in whose lights the glorious beings and objects are clothed.

— Yasna 12.1 (translated by Lawrence H. Mills).

In Yasna 12.1, the Fravarane proper is actually the second and third line. The role and position of the first line of Yasna 12 is unclear. According to Darmesteter, it forms a natural unit with the lase line of the preceding section and both should be seen as a single verse. Furthermore, verses 12.8 and 12.9 are used within the Kusti prayer.

== The Fravarane as a ritual intro ==
Fravarane
- Fravarane in Darmesteter's French translation of the Avesta

Information
- Religion: Zoroastrianism
- Language: Avestan
- Period: Avestan period

The Zoroastrian ritual system is highly modular, such that specific texts can appear in slightly different variants in different rituals. More recent scholarship has emphasized the crucial role which the another use of the Fravarane plays within this system. Within Geldner's edition of the Avesta, this Fravarane is for instance present at Y 0.1-3, Y 0.7-13, Y 1.23, Y 3.24 Y 11.16 (where it is directly preceding the other variant at Y. 12) Y 14.4-5, Y 23.5, Y 27.12, Y 62.12-13, and Y 68.23.

=== In the Zoroastrian ritual system ===
Unlike the so called declaration of faith (Y. 12), which is only found at one place in the Avesta, this other use of the Fravarane is found in many different parts of the Avesta and the corresponding Zoroastrian ritual system. Not only does it appear several times in the Long Liturgies, like the Yasna liturgy or the Visperad liturgy; it is also found in many of the so called Short Liturgies, like the Afrinagans, Niyayishns or Yashts. Within the Short Liturgies, it appears only once and only at the beginning of the ceremony. In the Long Liturgies, however, it appears several times, where it typically introduces individual litanies.

=== Structure ===
This variant of the Fravarane also forms a larger textual unit, which appears in many different places and therefore shows a lot of variation. There is, however, a common structure found among these different contexts. This common structures consists of several parts: It starts with three repetitions of the Ashem vohu manthra; followed by the Fravarane proper; then a list of the ratu and yazatas to which the following ceremony is dedicated; and finally the dialogic version of the Ahuna vairya manthra, called the waz girishnih.

Ashem vohu
Recited three times

Fravarane proper
I choose (to be one) whose sacrifice is to Mazdā, (to be one) who belongs to Zaraθuštra,
(to be one) who expels the demons, (to be one) who follows the teachings of the Lord.

Ratus
For the righteous pressing time of Order
for sacrifice, prayer, gratification and praise.
For the righteous morning- and clan-time of Order
for sacrifice, prayer, gratification and praise.
For sacrifice, prayer, gratification and praise
of the (entire) day-, daily, monthly, annual, and (entire) year-times.

Dialogic Ahuna vairya (waz girishnih)
Chief priest: As he is to be chosen by existence, the chief priest speaks (it) forth to me’
Assistant priest: As he is to be chosen by existence, (the one) who (is) the chief priest speaks (it) forth to me,
Chief priest: Thus (is) the judge on the basis of Order. Let the righteous, knowing one speak (it) forth!

— Yasna 68.23 (translated by Stefano Damanins).

The dedication to the ratus is very variable depending on the ceremony. In particular the temporal ratus can change dramatically depending on what gāh, day or part of the year the ceremony takes place. Another variation are the dedicatories, i.e., the yazatas to which a ceremony is addressed. This is indicated in all Short Liturgies as well as in the initial Fravaranes of the Long Liturgy.
