= Nasu (Zoroastrianism) =

Zoroastrian Daeva of corpse matter

Nasu (Also; Druj Nasu, Nasa, Nas, Nasuš) is the Avestan name of the female Zoroastrian demon (daeva) of corpse matter. She resides in the north (Vendidad. 7:2), where the Zoroastrian hell lies. Nasu takes the form of a fly, and is the manifestation of the decay and contamination of corpses (nasa) (Bundahishn. 28:29). When a death occurs, Nasu inhabits the corpse and acts as a catalyst for its decomposition. Nasu appears in various texts within the Avesta, notably the Vendidad, as the Vendidad gives particular focus to demons, purification rituals, and the disposal of corpses and other dead matter. Nasu is commonly considered “the greatest polluter of Ahura Mazda’s world.” Belief in Nasu has greatly influenced Zoroastrian funeral rites and burial ceremonies, as well as the general disdain for corpse matter that is harbored within Zoroastrian practitioners.

== Etymology ==
Druj, meaning “demoness,” is commonly used as a prefix for Nasu and other female daevas. Druj is a feminine Avestan language word meaning “falsehood,” the opposition of asha, or “truth.” Druj is the root for the adjective drəguuaṇt, meaning “owner of falsehood,” which “[designates] all beings who choose druj over asha." Druj is used in various texts of the Avesta, with varying meanings. Depending upon the context, druj may refer to specific demons, or as a general term for that which is false, immoral, or unclean.

The Avestan words nasu and nasa refer to corpses, or other solid dead matter such as nails and hair. Therefore, Nasu’s name literally means “corpse matter.”

== In the Vendidad ==
=== Contamination of the dead ===
Directly after death, as soon as the soul has left a corpse, “the druj Nasu rushes upon” the body, “in the shape of a raging fly, with knees and tail sticking out, droning without end” (Vd. 7:2). As soon as Nasu takes hold of a corpse, the body instantly becomes contaminated. If one comes into contact with a corpse, Nasu will emerge from the body and infect them, rendering them “unclean … for ever and ever” (Vd. 3:14). Nasu continues to inhabit the corpse until the sagdīd ritual is performed, during which a dog must look at the corpse, or until a carrion-eating bird or dog consumes the body, which causes her to return to her home in the north (Vd. 7:3).

=== Contamination of the living ===
Besides contaminating corpses upon death, Nasu also contaminates those who interact with corpse-matter in specific ways. In Vendidad 3:14, Ahura Mazda explains to the prophet Zoroaster that one must never carry a corpse on their own, lest Nasu’s infection transfers to them. If one carries a corpse alone, Nasu emerges “from the nose … , the eye, the tongue, the sexual organs, and the hinder parts” of the deceased, and “rushes upon [the corpse bearer] … [and stains him] even to the end of the nails, and he is unclean, thenceforth, forever and ever” (Vd. 3:14). In this case, there is no way to purify the infected individual. In order to avoid the spread of contamination, he must live in an enclosure where “the ground is the cleanest and the dryest and the least passed through by flocks and herds, by the fire of Ahura Mazda, by the consecrated bundles of Baresma, (Note: Baresma: an Avestan language word for a wand of the Magi, made from a branch.) and by the faithful” (Vd. 3:15). There, other Zoroastrians must provide him with “the coarsest food” and “the most worn-out clothes,” until he ages into an old man (hana) (Vd. 3:18-19). Once he is elderly, the infected must be beheaded, and his corpse is offered to the vultures. At this point, “he is absolved by his repentance” (Vd. 3:20-21).

Nasu also attacks humans who consume the corpse of a dog or human, or those who put a corpse in water or fire. These individuals are considered unclean forever, with no option of repentance (Vd. 7:23-26). Nasu will also attack humans and dogs who are nearby a person at the time of their death (Vd. 5:27).

=== Purification ===
In some cases, a living individual who has been defiled by Nasu has a chance at regaining purity, if the proper purification rites are performed (Vd. 9:42). However, if the ritual is performed by an unqualified purifier, Nasu will grow stronger, and the contamination will heighten (Vd. 9:48).

In fargard 10 of the Vendidad, Ahura Mazda recommends recitation of certain verses from the Gathas to “fight against” Nasu and purify a contaminated individual (Vd. 10:1-12). Some verses must be recited twice (Yasna. 28:2, 35:2, 35:8, 39:4, 41:3, 41:5, 43:1, 47:1, 51:1, 53:1), thrice (Y. 27:14, 33:11, 35:5, 53:9), or four times (Y. 27:13, 34:15, 54:1).

The Sros baj, or “utterance against pollution,” an important daily recitation in honor of Sraosha, “is a powerful prophylactic prayer that protects one against decay and death.”

=== Offspring ===
In fargard 18 of the Vendidad, Sraosha has a dialogue with Nasu. While striking Nasu, he asks her if she bears offspring without copulating with a man (Vd. 18:30). To this, Nasu responds that she is impregnated whenever practitioners of Zoroastrianism are greedy (Vd. 18:34), “emit seed” during sleep (Vd. 18:46), spill water (Vd. 18:40), or if they “[walk] without wearing the sacred girdle and the sacred shirt” (Vd. 18:54). Conversely, “the fruit of [her] womb” is destroyed every time one is generous to another Zoroastrian, or recites the Ahuna Vairya after emitting seed or spilling water.

== Funeral rites and burial ceremonies ==
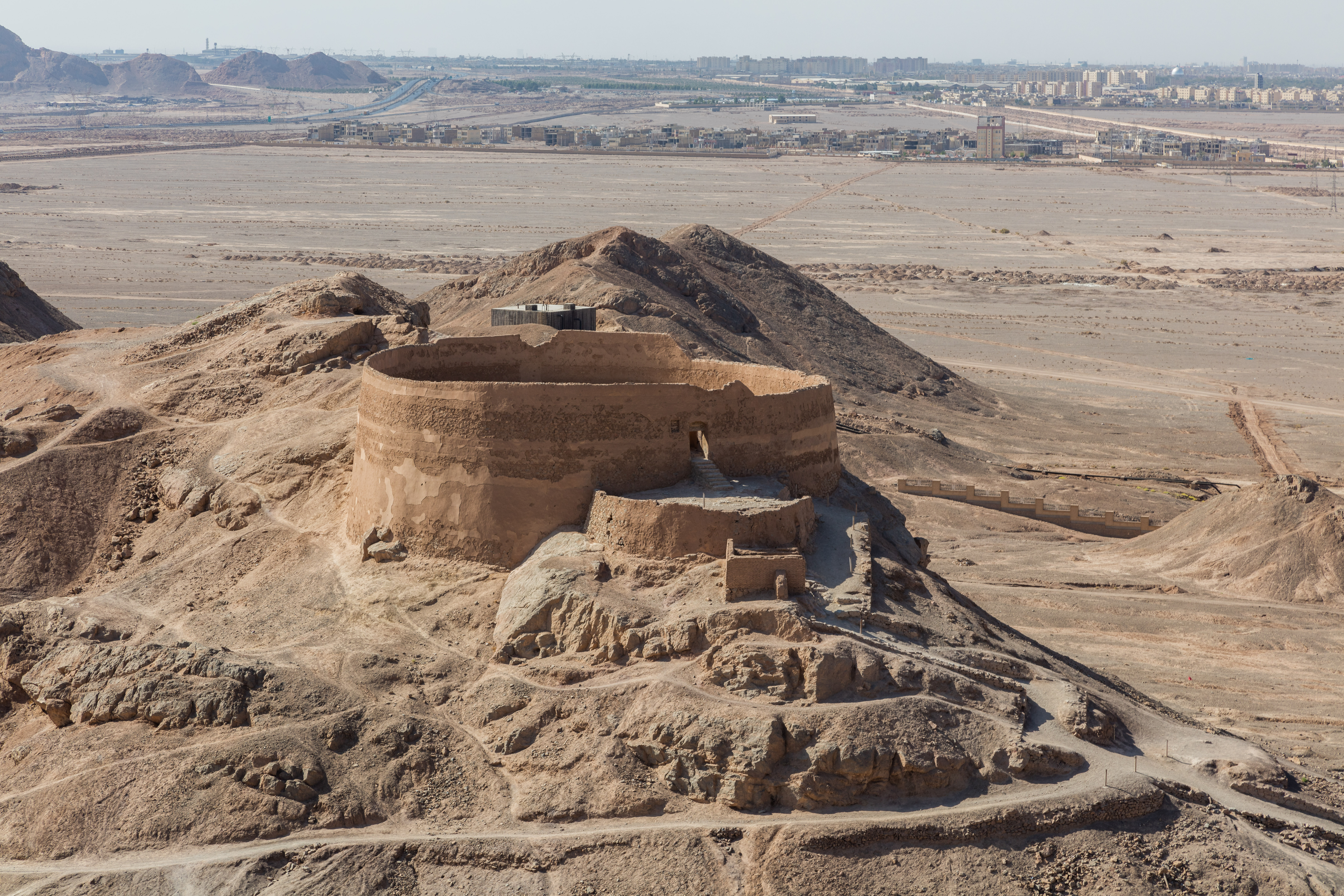
Tower of Silence near Yazd, Iran. The structure is no longer in use.

The belief that bodies are infested by Nasu upon death greatly influenced Zoroastrian burial ceremonies and funeral rites. Burial and cremation of corpses was prohibited, as such acts would defile the sacred creations of earth and fire respectively (Vd. 7:25). Burial of corpses was so looked down upon that the exhumation of “buried corpses was regarded as meritorious.” For these reasons, “Towers of Silence” were developed—open air, amphitheater like structures in which corpses were placed so carrion-eating birds could feed on them.

Sagdīd, meaning “seen by a dog,” is a ritual that must be performed as promptly after death as possible. The dog is able to calculate the degree of evil within the corpse, and entraps the contamination so it may not spread further, expelling Nasu from the body (Denkard. 31). Nasu remains within the corpse until it has been seen by a dog, or until it has been consumed by a dog or a carrion-eating bird (Vd. 7:3). According to chapter 31 of the Denkard, the reasoning for the required consumption of corpses is that the evil influences of Nasu are contained within the corpse until, upon being digested, the body is changed from the form of nasa into nourishment for animals. The corpse is thereby delivered over to the animals, changing from the state of corrupted nasa to that of hixr, which is “dry dead matter,” considered to be less polluting.

A path through which a funeral procession has traveled must not be passed again, as Nasu haunts the area thereafter, until the proper rites of banishment are performed (Vd. 8:15). Nasu is expelled from the area only after “a yellow dog with four eyes, (Note: A dog with a spot above either eye.) or a white dog with yellow ears” is walked through the path three times (Vd. 8:16). If the dog goes unwillingly down the path, it must be walked back and forth up to nine times to ensure that Nasu has been driven off (Vd. 8:17-18).

== In popular culture ==
Nasu appears as a villain in eight games from the Megami Tensei video game franchise: Digital Devil Story: Megami Tensei, Digital Devil Story: Megami Tensei II, Kyūyaku Megami Tensei, Shin Megami Tensei: if…, Last Bible III, Ronde, Giten Megami Tensei: Tokyo Mokushiroku, and Revelations: Persona. In these games, she is either referred to as Druj (ドゥルジ, Duruji), Nasu (ナース, Nāsu), or Nasu Fly (ナース蝿, Nāsu Hae). In Shin Megami Tensei: if… Nasu is a boss, while she appears as lesser demons in the other games. They also appear as giant enemy parasitoid wasps in Prince of Persia: The Lost Crown.

Nasu is a card in four battle RPG smartphone games for Android and IOS: Age of Ishtaria, Guardian Cross, Legend of the Cryptids, and Blood Brothers. In each of these games, she is called Druj Nasu.

A Druj Nasu is a type of div that players can encounter in the tabletop role-playing game, Pathfinder.

== See also ==
- Angra Mainyu
- Daeva
- Excarnation
- Ritual purification
- Vendidad
