= Eugenio Biagini =

Italian historian

Eugenio F. Biagini FRHistS
- Born: 31 July 1958 (age 68); Pietrasanta, Italy
- Occupations: Professor of Modern and Contemporary History

Academic background
- Education: University of Pisa Scuola Normale Superiore

Academic work
- Discipline: History

Eugenio F. Biagini is an Italian historian, specialising in democracy and liberalism in nineteenth- and twentieth-century Britain, Ireland and Italy, and is currently Professor in Modern British and European History at the University of Cambridge. He is best known for his work in free trade economics and ideology, the Italian risorgimento, Irish national identity, and the religious dimension of popular radicalism in the nineteenth century.

== Biography ==
He completed his bachelor's degree at the University of Pisa before completing his doctorate at the Scuola Normale Superiore di Pisa. In the early 1990s he was based at Princeton University, and in 1996 he moved to Cambridge University, where he is currently Professor in Modern British and European History, and a fellow of Sidney Sussex College. Biagini is married to fellow academic Almut Hintze and has one son.

The Gladstone Club has said: "Of the many biographies of Gladstone his is the most concise but also arguably the most profound." His 2007 work, British Democracy and Irish Nationalism 1876–1906, was awarded the British Scholar Book of the Month for February 2009.

== Works ==
- Currents of Radicalism. Popular Radicalism, Organised Labour and Party Politics in Britain, 1850-1914 (editor) (Cambridge University Press, 1991).
  - ‘Currents of radicalism, 1850-1914’ (with Alastair J. Reid), pp. 1–21.
  - ‘Popular Liberals, Gladstonian finance, and the debate on taxation, 1860-1874’, pp. 134–162.
- Liberty, Retrenchment and Reform. Popular Liberalism in the Age of Gladstone. 1860-1880 (Cambridge University Press, 1992).
- Citizenship and Community. Liberals, Radicals and Collective Identities in the British Isles, 1865-1931 (editor) (Cambridge University Press, 1996).
  - ‘Introduction: Citizenship, liberty and community’, pp. 1–19.
  - ‘Liberalism and direct democracy: John Stuart Mill and the model of ancient Athens’, pp. 21–44.
- Gladstone (Palgrave Macmillan, 2000).
- ‘Exporting ‘Western & Beneficent Institutions’: Gladstone and Empire, 1880-1885’, in David Bebbington and Roger Swift (eds.), Gladstone Centenary Essays (Liverpool University Press, 2000), pp. 202–224.
- The Risorgimento and the Unification of Italy (with Derek Beales) (Longmans, 2002).
- ‘From Jacobin to Whig? Ugo Foscolo's "English" constitutional thought, 1816-1827’, European Journal of Political Theory (2005).
- British Democracy and Irish Nationalism, 1876-1906 (Cambridge University Press, 2007).
- ‘Keynesian ideas and the recasting of Italian democracy, 1945-1953’, in E. H. H. Green and D. M. Tanner (eds.), The Strange Survival of Liberal England: Political Leaders, Moral Values and the Reception of Economic Debate (Cambridge University Press, 2007), pp. 212–246.
- Giuseppe Mazzini and the Globalization of Democratic Nationalism, 1830-1920 (editor with Christopher Bayly) (Oxford University Press, 2008).
  - ‘Introduction’ (with Christopher Bayly), pp. 1–11.
  - ‘Mazzini and Anticlericalism: The English Exile’, pp. 145–166.
- A History of European Democratic Thought (with Salvo Mastellone) (Longmans, 2011).
- ‘Abraham Lincoln in Germany and Italy, 1859-1865’, in R. Carwardine and J. Sexton (eds.), The Global Lincoln (Oxford, 2011), pp. 76–94.
- ‘The politics of Italianism: Reynolds's Newspaper, the Indian Mutiny and the Radical Critique of Liberal imperialism in Mid-Victorian Britain’, T. Crook, R. Gill and B. Taithe (eds.), Evil, Barbarism and Empire. Britain and Abroad c. 1830-2000 (London, 2011), pp. 99–125.
