= Dahman =

Dahman or Dahman Afrin is the Avestan language name of a Zoroastrian concept, later considered to be the embodiment of prayer, and ultimately (also) as a divinity, one of the yazatas.

Dahman Afrin in its true sense literally translates to 'devout blessing(s)', and the divinity Dahman is the active principle and hypostasis of the Gathic Avestan Dahma Afriti invocation (Yasna 60.2-7). Yasna 61 also refers to the prayer as Dahma Vangui Afriti and considers it to be the fourth most potent incantation. The prayer is invoked as a blessing upon the house of the ashavan, which may be translated as 'just' or 'true' man. The concept has its origin in the more ancient Indo Iranian religion and is similar to Vedic concept of Dharma.

In Zoroastrian tradition, the divinity Dahman appears as Middle Persian Dahm.

== In scripture ==
As used in Yasna 60 and 61, the term dahma appears to mean 'pious' or 'good', but that it may have originally been used to refer to one who had been initiated into the Zoroastrian religion. Zend translations of Yasna 61 and middle Persian glossaries appear to have considered the term unfamiliar enough that it needed explanation. In these, dahm is considered the essence of the just man, and the name of the prayer is translated as 'blessings of the good/pious'. However, according to Boyce (1982), the authors of the Zend were mistaken. According to her, dahm was not a (masculine plural) noun, but an (accusative singular feminine) adjective "used exclusively of Afriti among the divine beings." The mistranslation became the standard name of the prayer, and ultimately embodied as that of a yazata.

The potency of the Dahma Afriti invocation is also mentioned in the Vendidad as Ahura Mazda's reward for a cure for disease (Vendidad 22.5). It is also the payment a priest may give for medicinal services rendered unto him (Vendidad 7.41, 9.37), which – a Zend commentary explains - is more valuable than any other form of payment.

As the essence of the just man, dahman was eventually personified as the divinity Dahman Afrin, or just Dahman. As a divinity, Dahman only appears thrice in the surviving texts of the Avesta (once in Siroza 33, and once each in fragments P31 and P32) and once in a Zend translation of the lost Sudgar Nask.

== In tradition ==
In addition, Dahman appears several times in the Denkard, as the greatest saviour from the daevas (815.4-815.8), a description also provided by the Shayest ne shayest supplementary (13.43). A Sassanid era commentary on Siroza 33 notes that property acquired honestly is protected by Dahman Afrin.

Boyce (1982) suggests that Dahman may once have had a dedication of the twenty-third day of the month of the Zoroastrian calendar, but was displaced when three additional days were assigned to Ahura Mazda. Dahman continues to be invoked with Apam Napat (middle Persian: Burz Yazad) and Haoma (Hom) together with Anagra Raoca (Aneran), the divinity of the thirtieth day of the month.

In Zoroastrian cosmogony, Dahman was created though, and is associated with, the Amesha Spenta Shahrevar (Avestan: Kshathra [Vairya]), the guardian of metals and minerals. (Bundahishn 3.16)

Dahman also plays a role as the yazata who receives the souls of the just/pious at sunrise on the fourth day after death. In that Afringan ('ritual of blessing'), Dahman is summoned to accept the soul of the deceased from Sarosh (under whose care it had remained for the previous four days) and accompany it until the soul's Fravashi is united with it. (Dhalla, 1938)

Beyond these references, Dahman Afrin is of no great significance in modern Zoroastrianism, and is overshadowed by Sarosh, with whom Dahman is frequently associated. There is no Yasht dedicated to Dahman, but it has been suggested that the divinity of prayer was once important to the Zoroastrian priesthood. (Boyce, 1993b)

Unlike most other yazatas, Dahman is a purely Zoroastrian concept, with no pre-Zoroastrian equivalent, and was not inherited as an entity by later Persian mythology.

== Bibliography ==
- Boyce, Mary (1993a). "Dahma Afriti and Some Related Problems". Bulletin of the School of Oriental and African Studies. 56 (2): 209–218. doi:10.1017/S0041977X00005474. S2CID 162403128.
- Boyce, Mary (1993b). "Dahm Yazad". Encyclopaedia Iranica. Vol. 6. Costa Mesa: Mazda Pub.
- Boyce, Mary (1982). History of Zoroastrianism. Vol. 2. Leiden: Brill.
- Dhalla, Maneckji Nusservanji (1938). History of Zoroastrianism. New York: OUP. ISBN 0-404-12806-8.
