= Barashnûm =

Barashnûm, Barašnum or Barashnûm nû shaba, is a Zoroastrian purification ritual which lasts nine nights. Because the ritual lasts nine nights, it is known as Barashnûm nû shaba or "Barashnûm of the nine nights".

== Etymology ==
Barashnûm is a Zend word meaning "top of the head". The whole ritual is named "Barashnûm" because purification starts from the head of the person, which is the first part in his body which is purified.

== Purpose ==
In pre-Islamic times, Barashnûm was used to purify men and women who had been defiled by contact with dead matter and by priests before undergoing training for priesthood and certain ceremonies. However, now the Bareshnum ceremony is only undertaken by priests before their Navar and Martab training ceremonies for initiation into priesthood and before the Vendidad Nirangdin Yasna ceremonies and the one to purify men or women coming in contact with dead is discontinued.

== The ritual ==
Fargard 9 of the Vendidad prescribes the requirements for the Barashnûm ritual. It prescribes that a series of six holes two feet deep if it was summer season and four feet deep if it was winter season be dug at a distance of three feet from each other and a series of three holes at a distance of nine feet from the other six. The hole at the most extreme corner should be situated at a distance of at least thirty paces from the holy fire or consecrated barsom and three paces from "clean" Zoroastrians. The holes should lie in a north–south direction and the first six are to be filled with gōmēz while the other three are to be filled with water.

Holes 4-6 should be separated from holes 7-9 through a ring of 3 furrows arranged concentrically which act as a protective barrier. Similarly, holes 4-9 were to be separated from holes 1-3 by a barrier of 3 furrows. This arrangement is called the Barashnûm-gâh and is to be separated from cleaner pastures by an outer enclosure comprising a series of three furrows.

The impure person should walk to each of the holes containing gomez in turn while reciting Yasna 49 of the Avesta while the Zoroastrian priest recites the same from outside the furrow surrounding the hole and sprinkles gomez upon the impure person on completion of each recitation. The priest purifies the brows, the back of the skull, jaws, ears, the shoulders, arm-pits, chest, back, nipples, ribs, hips, genitals, thighs, knees, legs, ankles, feet and toes of the subject by sprinkling a few drops of gomez upon them. Once the purification is complete, the subject recites the Ahunwar, Kem-na-Mazda, Kem verethrem ja and other principal prayers of the Zoroastrians.

The defiled person, then sits inside the outer enclosure but outside the ones enclosing holes 4-9 and rubs dust all over his body for it to dry. He, then enters the inner furrows and steps in the holes 4-9 cleansing himself with the water contained in them. Once the ritual is complete, he may come out of the Barashnûm-gâh and is permitted to return to his house. However, he is confined to a corner of the house called Armêsht-gah for nine nights. During this period, he is prohibited from contacting water, fire, earth, cow, trees and other Zoroastrians as he is considered to be impure and his contact is believed to defile the objects around him. Once every three days, he is enjoined to bathe himself and wash his clothes in gomez and water as a part of the purification ritual. On the completion of his third bath, he is considered to be "completely purified" and is permitted to lead a normal life.

== Fee for the cleanser ==
The fee to be paid to the priest who cleanses an impure person is also specified in the Fargard 9 of the Vendidad. The Fargard decrees that a fellow defiled priest should be cleansed in return for blessings, the lord of province for the payment of a camel, the lord of a town for the payment of a horse, the lord of a borough for the payment of a bull, and a householder in return for a three-year-old cow.

The Vendidad also specifies the punishment to be handed to a priest who has erred in the rituals.

The cleanser who has not performed the cleansing according to the rites, shall be taken to a desert place; there they shall nail him with four nails, they shall take off the skin from his body, and cut off his head. If he has performed Patet for his sin, he shall be holy (that is, he shall go to paradise); if he has not performed Patet, he shall stay in hell till the day of resurrection

— The Vendidad, Fargard III

== See also ==
- Epistles of Manushchihr
