= Sad-dar =

The Sad-dar or Saddar, literally "Hundred Doors", is a Persian book about Zoroastrianism. The hundred chapters are guidelines that Zoroastrians should follow.
