= Sagdid =

Zoroastrian funerary ritual

Sagdid ([sægˈdiːd]) is a ritual which forms an essential part of a Zoroastrian funeral ceremony. The word "Sagdid" means "glance of the dog" (sag meaning "dog" and -did meaning "to see"). Sagdid involves having a sacred dog watch over a recently deceased body, often before it has been touched by anybody else. The ritual is thought to restore purity, lessen the chance of infection, and more practically the ritual is used to determine if the deceased is truly deceased. Sagdid is also performed over deceased dogs in some instances.

== Dogs in Zoroastrianism ==
The Vendidad speaks of different kinds of dogs such as the shepherd's dog, house-dog and hunting dog. Additionally, it also classifies the fox, the weasel, the otter, the porcupine, and the hedgehog as "dogs". The otter ("water dog") is highly sacred in that multitudes of individual dogs are considered to be reborn into a single otter.

A detailed treatment of the various types of dogs, their virtues and rights are given in Fargard 13, 14, and 15 of the Vendidad. "Dogs", especially true dogs in the biological sense (Canis lupus familiaris, whether domestic or stray), are considered to deserve respect and protection; there are detailed prescriptions concerning the care which is due to them and the harsh punishments for those who harm them. For more details, see Dogs in Zoroastrianism.

== The ritual of Sagdid ==
The ritual of Sagdid is explained in Fargard 8 of the Vendidad. The dog is perceived to be a beneficent animal and the Druj is believed to flee at the very glance of the dog.

You shall therefore cause the yellow dog with four eyes, or the white dog with yellow ears, to go three times through that way. When either the yellow dog with four eyes, or the white dog with yellow ears, is brought there, then the Drug Nasu flies away to the regions of the north, in the shape of a raging fly, with knees and tail sticking out, all stained with stains, and like unto the foulest Khrafstras

— The Vendidad, Fargard VIII, Verse 16

The expression "four eyes" is thought to refer to a dog with two tan flecks above the eyes. In the absence of such a dog, any type of dog could be used.
