= Zoroastrian music =

Zoroastrian music is a genre of religious music that accompanies religious and traditional rites among the Zoroastrian people.

Although certain ancient Zoroastrian traditions show a negative approach towards Zoroastrian melodies such as the pre-Islamic pastorals and minstrels, Zoroastrian music has been in the religion since it was founded.

Historical texts prove that prior to the arrival of Islam in Persia, Zoroastrians knew choral and solo performance songs. The majority of these songs are no longer performed, although Zoroastrian religious songs still do remain. The wording of these songs are attained from either the Avesta or from the Gathas (sayings attributed to Zoroaster). Islamic influence can be seen in the melodies of the Naderi method of prayer recitation and pilgrim's songs. Musical instruments in zoroastrian such as Tonbak, Daf, Ney, Zurna, Tar (string instrument), Kamancheh, and Setar.

Due to the death of the mobeds, many Zoroastrian customs have been forgotten and only a few remain.
