= Darab Dastur Peshotan Sanjana =

Indian scholar and Zoroastrian head-priest

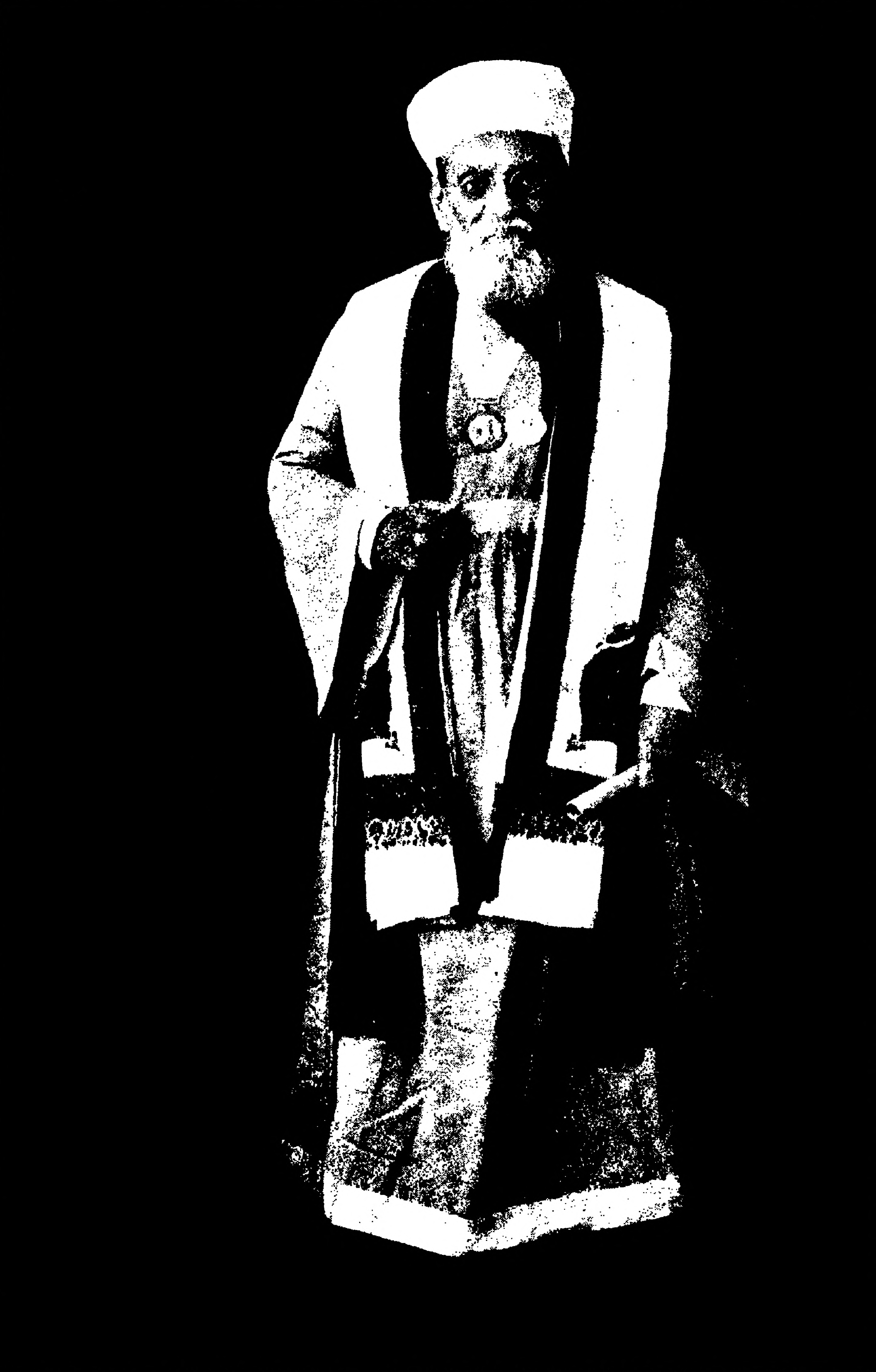
- Portrait of Darab Dastur Peshotan Sanjana, from The-Collected-Works-Of-The-Late-Dastur-Darab-Peshotan-Sanjana
- Born: 18 November 1857
- Died: 5 July 1931 (aged 73)
- Scientific career
- Institutions: Sir Jamshedji Jijibhoy Zartoshti Madressa, Bombay University

Darab Dastur Peshotan Sanjana (18 November 1857 – 5 August 1931) was an Indian scholar and Zoroastrian head-priest (Dastur). He is known for his translations of works from Central Asia, in languages including Bactrian, Pahlavi, and Avestan. He became a member of the Royal Asiatic Society of Great Britain and Ireland in 1893.

== Life ==
He was the son of Dastur Peshotan Behramji Sanjana, one of the most sophisticated high-priests and authorities on Pahlavi of his time. Bahramji taught the Avesta and Pahlavi to his son at the Sir Jamshedji Jijibhoy Zartoshti Madressa. Darab studied German, French, and Sanskrit and was elected Fellow of the Bombay University. After the death of Behramji in 1898, Darab succeeded his father as the Principal of the Madressa and as the high-priest of the Wadia Atash Behram.
