= Zoroastrian wedding =

Zoroastrian matrimony rituals

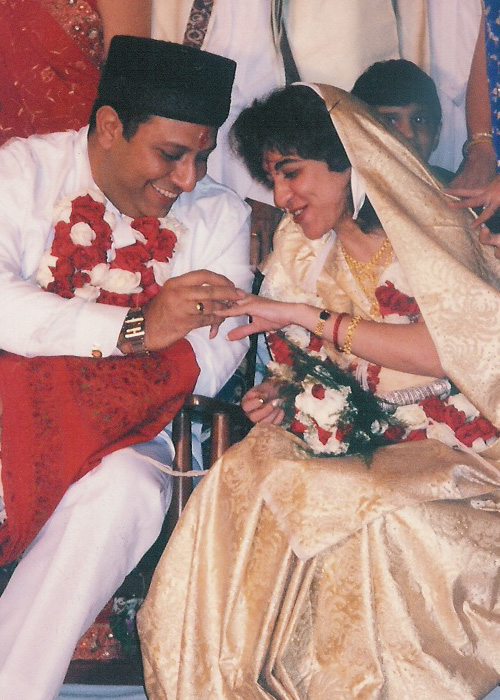
Parsi wedding (exchange of rings)

A Zoroastrian wedding is a religious ceremony in Zoroastrianism in which two individuals, usually a man and a woman, are united. In Zoroastrianism, marriage within the community is encouraged, and is greatly favored in religious texts. The following information will detail ceremony procedures and traditional processes for a Zoroastrian wedding.

== Prior to ceremony ==
=== Age ===
In the Avesta, manhood and womanhood are gained at the age of 15, when they would be ready for marriage. However, in India, the threshold for marriage is set by the Parsi Marriage and Divorce Act, 1936 which states the threshold at 21 for males and 18 for females. If either of the marrying parties are below the age given in the act, the parents of the underage marrying party must sign on the marriage certificate to signify their approval.

=== Arranged marriages ===
Traditionally marriages are arranged by the parents with the consent of the children. In recent times however, it is not uncommon for this system to be reversed, with the parents consulted about a decision made by the marrying parties.

== Ceremony ==
Ceremonies exist which are observed prior to the marriage. They will be most likely spread over several days. Ceremonies vary and not all the rites described below may be observed in one wedding. Other customs may also be included.

=== Prior to the marriage ===
==== Adrâvvûn ====
also known by the older name of Nâm pâdvûn

Presents of silver coins are prepared by the ladies of both the bride and bridegroom's families in the homes of the marrying parties, each group going to the other's home. It is upon this betrothal that the bride takes the name of her husband, even if the marriage does not later occur. This betrothal is often performed quickly after a marriage is arranged.

==== Divô ====
Two lamps are lit, one in each of the homes of the marrying parties. Once again the ladies travel to the home of the other party and place a silver coin upon the lamp. It is at this occasion that formal gifts are exchanged. This includes the exchange of wedding rings.

==== Âdarni ====
The third day before the wedding, is regarded as the day for gift exchanging. On this day the groom's family visits the bride's home to present her with all the gifts like clothes and jewelry. The ritual is known as Adarni. The bride herself may also go over to the groom's home for this tradition but the groom cannot do the same. The relatives, neighbors and friends are treated to a traditional meal of sev and dahi, boiled eggs and bananas.

=== The marriage ===
Parsi groom

Auspicious days, such as new moon day or Hormazd, the first day of the Parsee month, are generally favoured for the wedding ceremony, coming on the fourth day of festivities. The first day of these is known as mândav-saro, when a twig of a tree, generally a mango-tree, is planted near the door, symbolic of a wish for fertility. This is followed by two Varadh-patra days when religious ceremonies in honour of the dead are performed.

With the marriage ceremony occurring in the evening of the fourth day the bride and bridegroom will have prior taken baths, known as nân. The marriage must be performed in front of an assembly of witnesses, the Parsi Marriage and Divorce Act requires at least two witnesses as well as the priest.

The ceremonial dress of the Parsees is the Jâmâ-pichhoir of which the bride wears a white variety, with the bridegroom sporting the mark of a Kunkun on his forehead.

A few hours before the ceremony a procession forms carrying gifts to the bridegroom's house, usually accompanied by music. It then turns to the house of the bride where, typically, the marriage occurs. The assembly, once seated, awaits the arrival of the groom who is greeted at the door by the mother of the bride. Here a fresh Kunkun mark is placed upon his head.

During the ceremony rice is often used as a good luck symbol, with the bride and groom sprinkling each other with cupfuls of rice. So as to remove any evil destined for the groom an egg is passed round his head three times then thrown to the ground and broken, destroying the evil with it. A similar ritual is then performed with a coconut, and then with a small tray of water which is thrown to the ground.

At a point during the evening the groom will dip his hand into a water-pot (var-behendoo) which was part of the dowry. Into this pot he drops a silver coin, as a mark of appreciation for the gift.

When the bride and groom take their seats the groom sits to the right of the bride and they both face east. Rice is placed on trays either side of the couple to be thrown while they recite their benedictions. Candles, fire being an important symbol in the Zoroastrian faith, are placed either side also. The couple are flanked by a pair of witnesses, usually married relations. A curtain of cloth separates the couple.

Two priests officiate. The couple are asked by the priests whether they consent to the marriage. He then joins their hands, a custom known as Hâthevârô, "hand-fastening". The senior priest places the right hands of the couple into each other. Then a piece of cloth is passed round the chairs of both and tied together enclosing them in a circle. The priest then fastens, seven times, with raw twist their right hands which are grasped by each other. The prayer of Yatha Ahu Vairyo is recited throughout.

The curtain is then dropped and the couple throw rice over each other, the first to do so is said to "win".

The senior priest then blesses the couple by saying:

May the Creator, the omniscient Lord, grant you a progeny of sons and grandsons, plenty of means to provide yourselves, heart-ravishing friendship, bodily strength, long life and an existence of 150 years!

Various questions are then asked to the bride, groom and witnesses. Once they have replied, affirming that they have entered into this with righteous mind the priest will recite admonitions and benedictions. Then the couple symbolically eat from the same dish, a rite known as Dahi-Koomro. At the close of the ceremony, as well as at several junctures prior, nuptial songs may be sung.

A wedding feast then occurs at which toasts are made to God, the couple, the sacred fire temples, the guests and the host. Fish, a symbol of good luck, is served.
