= Almut Hintze =

Almut Hintze FBA
- Born: 7 June 1957 (age 69); Flinsbach, West Germany

Academic background
- Education: University of Heidelberg; University of Oxford; University of Erlangen-Nuremberg

Academic work
- Discipline: Classics
- Sub-discipline: Indo-Iranian studies
- Institutions: SOAS, University of London

Almut Hintze, FBA (born 7 June 1957) is an academic, philologist, linguist and scholar of Indo-Iranian studies and Zoroastrianism. Since 2010, she has been Zartoshty Brothers Professor of Zoroastrianism at the School of Oriental and African Studies, University of London.

== Career ==
Born in West Germany on 7 June 1957, Almut Hintze completed her undergraduate degree in classics at the Heidelberg University in 1984. She then studied for a Master of Philosophy degree at the University of Oxford, which was awarded in 1986, before she completed her doctorate (Dr phil.) in Indo-Iranian studies at the University of Erlangen in 1990. The Free University of Berlin awarded her habilitation (Dr hab.) in 1997 for a study of the semantics of "reward" in Avestan and Vedic Sanskrit literature. She spent three years as the Heisenberg Junior Research Professor at the University of Cambridge until 2000, and simultaneously as a Research Fellow at Clare Hall, Cambridge (where she remained for another year). In 2001, she joined the School of Oriental and African Studies, University of London (SOAS) as the Zartoshty Lecturer. She was promoted to senior lecturer in 2005, then three years later to a readership. In 2010, she was appointed Zartoshty Brothers Professor of Zoroastrianism at SOAS.

According to her British Academy profile, Hintze's research focuses on "the languages, religions and history of pre-Islamic Iran and Central Asia with special attention to Zoroastrianism" and "Ancient and Middle Iranian philology and linguistics".

== Honours and awards ==
In 2015, Hintze was elected a Fellow of the British Academy, the United Kingdom's national academy for the humanities and social sciences.

== Personal life ==
Hintze is married to Eugenio Biagini, a Professor of Modern and Contemporary History at Cambridge University. The couple have a son.

== Selected publications ==
- — (2013). Change and Continuity in the Zoroastrian Tradition (Speech). An Inaugural Lecture Delivered on 22 February 2012. School of Oriental and African Studies: SOAS.
- with Kotwal, Firoze M. (2008). The Khorda Avesta and Yašt Codex E1 (Facsimile ed.). Harrassowitz.
- — (2007). A Zoroastrian Liturgy: The Worship in Seven Chapters (Yasna 35–41). Harrassowitz.
- — (2000). LOHN im Indoiranischen: Eine semantische Studie des Rigveda und Avesta [LOHN in the Indo-Iranian: A semantic study of the Rigveda and Avesta] (in German). Wiesbaden: Dr. Ludwig Reichert Verlag.
- — (1994). Zamyād Yašt: Text, Translation, Glossary. Wiesbaden: Dr Ludwig Reichert Verlag. ISBN 9783882267853.
- — (1994). Der Zamyād-Yašt: Edition, Übersetzung, Kommentar [The Zamyād-Yašt: Edition, translation, commentary] (in German). Wiesbaden: Dr Ludwig Reichert Verlag.
- — (1993). A lexicon to the Cyprian syllabic inscriptions. Hamburg: Helmut Buske.
