= Lawrence Heyworth Mills =

- Born: 1837; New York, New York
- Died: January 29, 1918; Oxford, England, United Kingdom
- Occupation: Professor
- Years active: 1880s?-1910s

Lawrence Heyworth Mills, DD, MA, (1837 – January 29, 1918), who generally published as L. H. Mills, was Professor of Zend Philology or the Persian language at Oxford University.

Mills was born in New York City to Philo L. Mills and Elizabeth Caroline Kane and attended school in Fairfax County, Virginia and in New York at New York University and finally moved to Oxford in 1887.

In 1887, Mills translated a portion, Gathas, of the Avestan language texts of the Avesta into English. This translation, which included the Yasna, Visparad, Afrînagân, Gâhs, and miscellaneous fragments, were subsequently publication as in volume 31 of Max Müller's Sacred Books of the East, as volume 3 of 3 of the series initiated by James Darmesteter.
