= Barsom =

Ritual implement used by Zoroastrian priests

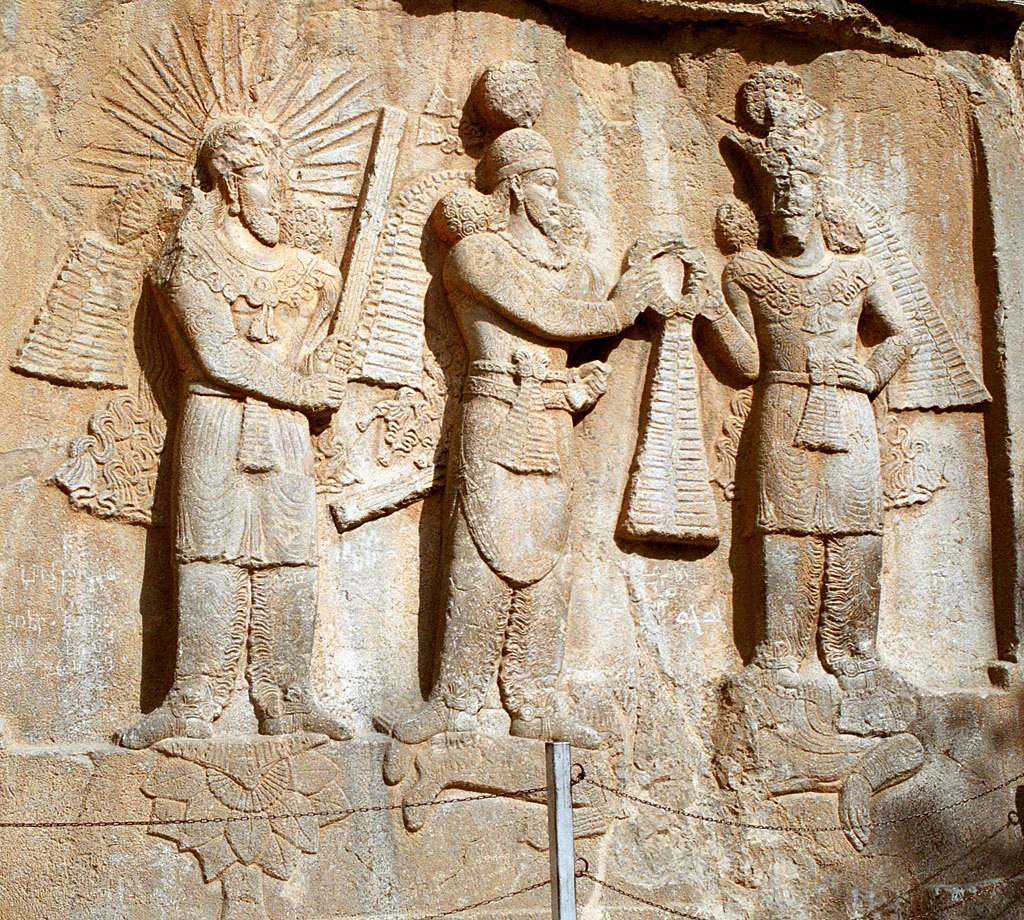
4th-century relief of the investiture of the Sasanian king Ardashir II (centre). Mithra (left) stands on a lotus flower holding a barsom.

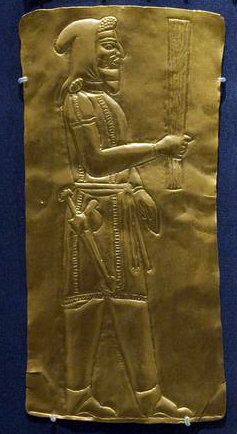
A 4th-century BCE depiction of a priest bearing a barsom. From the Oxus Treasure. The present-day barsom is much shorter, and made of wire.

A barsom /ˈbɑːrsəm/ is a ritual implement used by Zoroastrian priests to solemnize certain sacred ceremonies.

The word barsom derives from the Avestan language baresman (trisyllabic, bar'əs'man), which is in turn a substantive of barez "to grow high." The later form – barsom – first appears in the 9th–12th-century texts of Zoroastrian tradition, and remains in use to the present day.

The baresman is not related to the baresnum, which is a purification ceremony. The baresman should also not be confused with the "mace", the varza (Avestan, MP gurz). The varza is a metal rod, about one centimeter in thickness, often crowned with a bull's head.

It has been suggested that the baresman may have a Zagrosian origin.^{[a]}

== Physical characteristics ==
=== Material ===
In present-day use, the barsom is a bundle of short metal wires or rods, each about 20 cm in length and made of brass or silver.

The use of metal wires or rods is a relatively recent development: Until at least the 16th century, the barsom was made of twigs or stems, and there was an elaborate ritual surrounding their collection. There is no indication in scripture or older tradition as to which plant was to be used, and Yasna 25.3 eulogizes the plant without being specific.

One indication of which plant was used comes from the 16th century, where the authors of the Rivayat epistles reprimand their Indian co-religionists for not using twigs of the tamarisk (R. 329). The twigs of the pomegranate tree also figure in other late sources. Strabo (XV.3.14) speaks of "a bundle of slender myrtle rods."

=== Dimensions ===
Both scripture and tradition are precise with respect to the dimensions of the twigs required. Yasna 57.5 mandates that each twig shall not exceed "the height of the knee," and Vendidad 19.19 (supported by the Nirangistan) requires each rod to be at most the length of an aesha and the thickness of the width of a yava. Darmesteter translates aesha as "ploughshare" and yava as barley-corn. A twig/rod was thus at most about 7 mm thick. The Nirangstan further adds that the thickness may not be less than that of a human hair.

The barsom that appears in Achaemenid and Sassanid art "was of impressive size, about 45 cm (1 1/2 ft) long, made up apparently of stiff straight rods."

=== Number ===
The number of twigs/rods depends on the ritual being performed, and the Shayast-na Shayast (14.2) unambiguously states that this number must be adhered to. A recitation of the Yasna liturgy is accompanied by a bundle of 21 twigs, with two others being placed by the side of another ritual implement. The Vendidad requires 33 twigs in the bundle with two other placed as for the Yasna. A recitation of the Visperad requires 35 twigs, with none left over. The number similarly varies for other rituals, all of these however only requiring between 3 and 15 twigs.

=== Binding ===
In present-day use, the rods almost always remain unbound. The one exception comes near the end of the baj ceremony for the dead, when they are bound with a strip of date palm leaf.

== Use in ritual ==
In ritual, the barsom bundle is either held in the left hand, or placed across a pair of metallic stands about 20 cm in height, with one stand at each end of the bundle. These stands have a crescent-shaped brace at the top, so (also) preventing the rods from rolling off. The crescent shape gives them their name, mah-rui, literally "moon-faced." Dadestan-i Denig 48.17 states the stands must be of metal.

A barsom has no immediate practical purpose. At Zoroastrian ritual it represents plant creation, accompanying the other symbolic tokens that represent other facets of creation, and each of which then also represent the presence of an Amesha Spenta at the ritual. In the case of the barsom, it is Ameretat "immortality." The crescent-shaped brace of the barsom stand is likewise identified with vegetation: mah, the moon, is in Zoroastrian scripture and tradition the cosmogonical protector of plants and encourages their growth. "The object of holding the barsom and repeating prayers is to praise the Creator for the support accorded by nature and for the gift of the produce of the earth, which supplies the means of existence to the human and the animal world. The object of selecting the barsom from the twigs of a tree is to take it as a representative of the whole vegetable kingdom, for which benedictions and thanks to the Creator are offered, and there is further proof to show that the performance of the barsom ritual is intended to express gratitude to the Creator for His boundless gifts."

The barsom is also held by a priest during the abbreviated Yasna recitation before meals. An episode of the Shahnameh recalls that when Yazdegerd III (the last Sassanid emperor, but like his forefathers, also a priest) was in hiding, his request for a barsom gave him away to the enemy.

In Zoroastrian tradition, the second chapter of the Yasna liturgy is named the Barsom Yasht. As a part of the liturgy, it is not however part of the Yasht collection. In the Avesta categorization of Kellens, Yasna 2 – the Barsom Yasht – complements the other 7 of the first 8 Yasna chapters, the purpose of the 8-chapter set being an invitation of the divinities to the ceremony. After Yasna 1's initial invitation of Ahura Mazda, the Amesha Spentas and the remaining yazatas, the baresman and libation are presented to them in Yasna 2.

== See also ==
- Lulav
