= Gāh =

Gāh is a Middle Persian term with a range of meaning. Within Zoroastrianism, it may refer to a particular time of the day as well as the prayers, which are to be recited at that time. The term may also be used in the sense of "place".

== Etymology ==
Middle Persian gāh (Middle Persian: 𐫃𐫀𐫍, romanized: g'h) is translated as both "place" or "time". It is continued in Modern Persian گاه (gah, "time", "seat"). The word goes back to Avestan: 𐬔𐬁𐬙𐬎 (gātav, "place, seat"). It is unclear how the Middle Persian term also acquired the meaning of "(period of) time".

== As time ==
In Zoroastrianism, each day is divided into five sections and a prayer is said in each section. Their names in Modern Persian are Havn (morning), Raftun (afternoon), Ozirn (evening), Iveh Sreetram (sunset to midnight) and Ashn (midnight to dawn). These five partitions of the day represent the smallest unit, used in Zoroastrianism to measure ritual time.

Overview of the gāhs and corresponding yazatas
No	Avestan	Middle Persian	Persian	Duration	Yazatas
1	Hāuuani	Hāwan	Havn	6 am - 12 pm	Miθra, Rāman
2	Rapiθßina	Rapihwin	Raftun	12 pm - 3 pm	Aša, Ātar
3	Uzaiieirina	Uzērin	Ozirn	3 pm - 6 pm	Apam Napāt, Ap
4	Aißisrūθrima aibigaiia	Ēbsrūsrim	Iveh Sreetram	6 pm - 12 am	Ašāunąm frauuašinām
5	Ušahina	Ušahin	Ashn	12 am - 6 am	Sraoša, Rašnu, Arštat

Their Middle Persian name gāh is not derived from Avestan, where this unit of ritual time is called asniia- ratu ("the times of the day"). Mills has speculated that Middle Persian gāh is actually connected to the Middle Persian term for the Gathas and the practice of chanting them at different times of the day.

== As text ==
The term Gāh also refers to a collection of five texts, which correspond to the five watches of the day. In the scholarly community, they have received relatively little attention. They are typically compiled with the Khordeh Avesta, a collection of shorter liturgies and prayers aimed at lay people, and are supposed to be recited by them during each watch. All five Gāhs follow a similar structure. The beginning consists of the Fravarane, whereas the main part is characterized by a sequence of yazamaide sections similar to the Yashts.

== As place ==
Middle Persian gāh has the primary meaning of "place" or "seat". It might be derived from Indo-Iranian *gā, itself probably derived from Indo-European *gwā. Unlike the meaning of time, its common meaning of "place" or "seat" does regularly appear in the Avesta. It also appears in Old Persian inscriptions as gāθu.
