= Dastur Peshotan Behramji Sanjana =

Indian scholar and Zoroastrian head-priest

Dastur Peshutan Behramji Sanjana
- Born: 1828
- Died: 26 December 1898
- Children: Darab Dastur Peshutan Sanjana
- Scientific career
- Institutions: Sir Jamshedji Jijibhoy Zartoshti Madressa, University of Mumbai

Dastur Peshutan Behramji Sanjana (1828–26 December 1898) was an Indian scholar and Zoroastrian head-priest (Dastur). He was Principal of the Sir Jamshedji Jijibhoy Zartoshti (Zoroastrian) Madressa (seminary) in Bombay, and the Dastur (‘high-priest’) of the Wadia Atash Behram (fire temple). Sanjana was one of the most learned high-priests and authorities on Pahlavi of his time. In 1904 a Festschrift was published in his honour with an introduction by Edward William West.
