= Vendidad =

Zoroastrian collection of texts within the Avesta

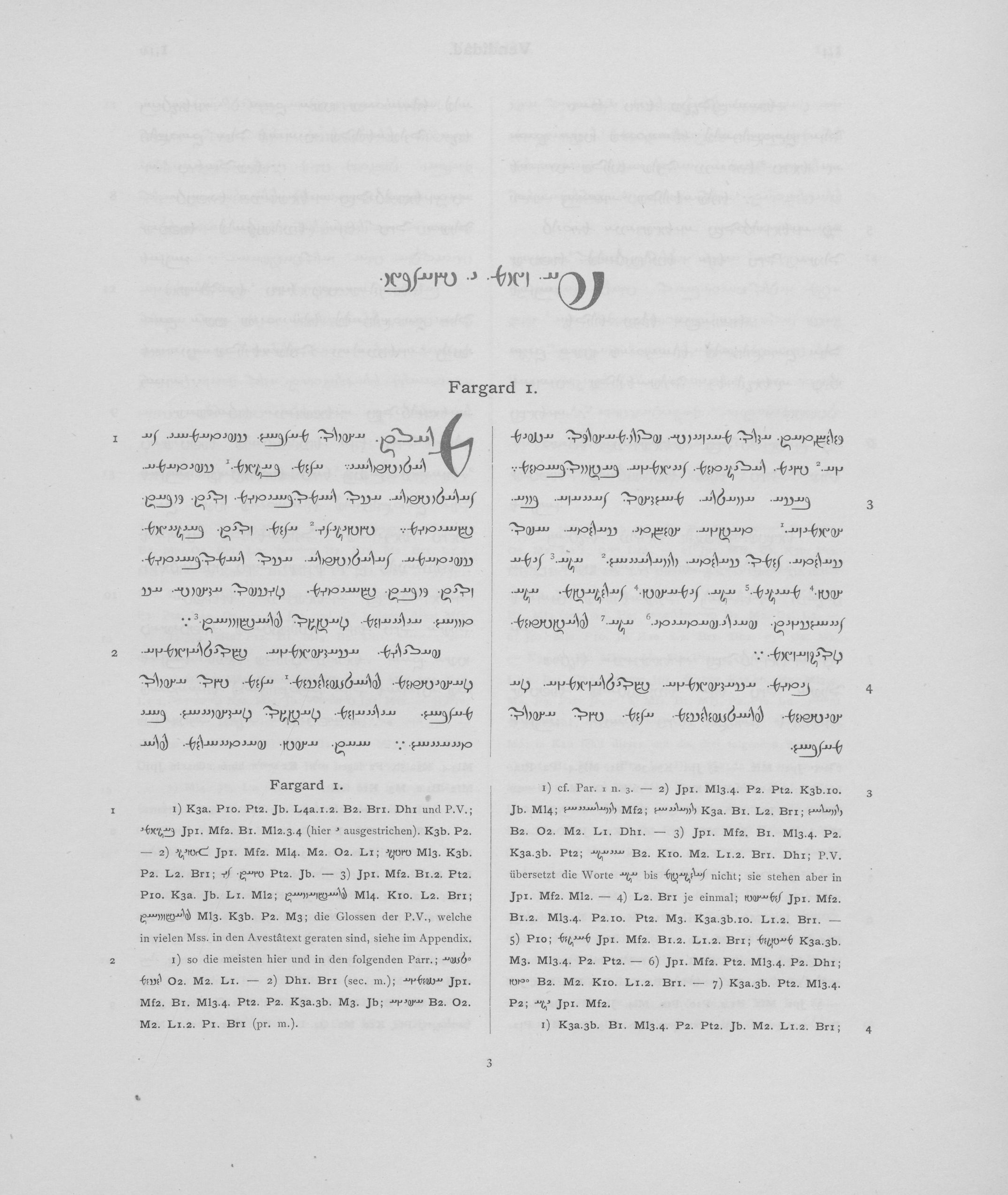
- First page of the Vendidad in Geldner's edition

Information
- Religion: Zoroastrianism
- Language: Avestan
- Chapters: 22 fragards

The Vendidad /ˈvendi'dæd/, also known as Videvdad or Juddevdad, is the only volume of the Sasanian Avesta to be still present in the extant Avesta collection. It is assumed that its use within the Videvdad liturgy guaranteed its survival to this day.

== Name ==
In the sources, the text is variously referred to as Vendidad, Videvdad or Juddewdad. All these forms are assumed to derive from Avestan 𐬬𐬍𐬛𐬀𐬉𐬬𐬋𐬛𐬁𐬙𐬀, (vī-daēvō-dāta). Whereas Juddewdad is the Middle Persian translation, Videvdad and Vendidad are seen as Middle Persian renderings of the Avestan original. In the scholarly literature, a wide range of transliterations can be found for these various forms. Examples include Vendīdād, Vīdēvdād, Vidēvdād or Wīdēwdād.

The interpretation of vī-daēvō-dāta, likewise varies in the literature. The term daēuua (𐬛𐬀𐬉𐬎𐬎𐬀) refers to the daevas; whereas dāta (𐬛𐬁𐬙𐬀) is an Avestan term for rule, norm or law. However, vī (𐬬𐬍) has a range of meanings, including against or away. Using the interpretation of vī as against, the name was originally interpreted as the law against the deavas. Nowadays, however, vī is interpreted as away and the name of the text as the law for pushing the deavas away.

== History ==
The classic view is that the Vendidad is a late creation and its current use within the Videvdad liturgy happened later still. This is based on the corrupted Avestan of the text and the seeming lack of any connection between its content and the liturgy in which it is used. Therefore, whereas the Vendidad may be a product of the Parthian period, the ceremony may be "an innovation of the Islamic period".

Both points have been challenged more recently. Skjaervo has argued that the corruptions of the Vendidad are not necessarily the result of a late redaction, but may have occurred during the process of its oral transmission. In addition, he demonstrates that at least the beginning and end of the Vendidad show a connection to the parts of the liturgy in which they are inserted. Cantera furthermore demonstrates a connection between its overall structure and the corresponding parts of the liturgy. This indicates that they were indeed composed as insertions. Finally, Cantera has shown that the performative variations of the liturgy are in proper Avestan, indicating that both the text and the liturgy were created when Avestan was still a productive language, i.e., during the much earlier Avestan period.

== Manuscripts ==
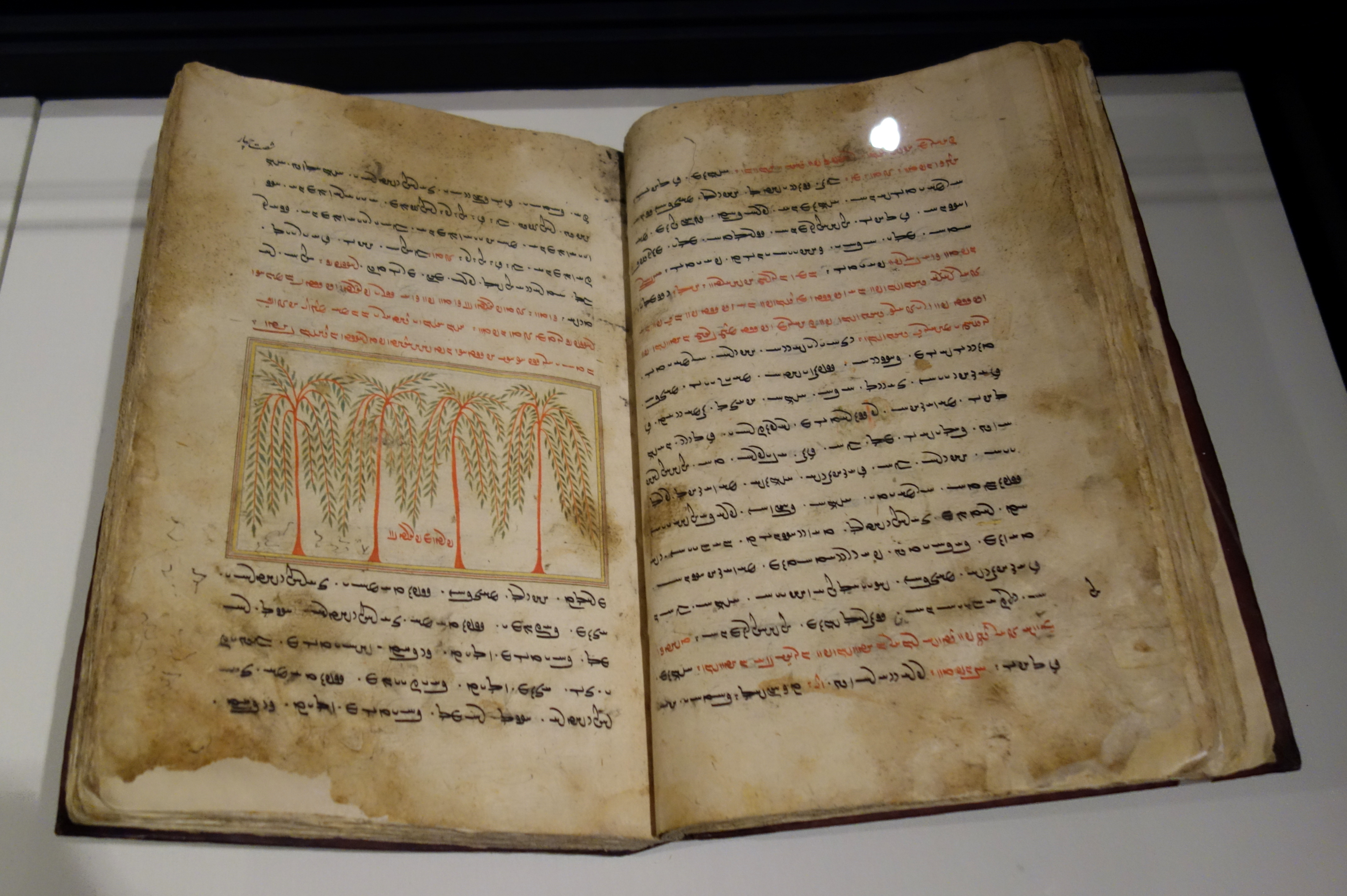
Iranian Vendidad Sade manuscript (MS 4060/RSPA 230) from Yazd (1647)

The text of the Vendidad has been transmitted in two types: exegetical manuscripts, called Pahlavi Vendidad, and liturgical manuscripts, called Vendidad Sade. Exegetical manuscripts contain only the 22 chapters of the Vendidad, but include a translation and commentary in Middle Persian, the written form of which is called Pahlavi.

On the other hand, liturgical manuscripts contain the text as it is performed in the liturgy, i.e., the text of the Yasht i Visperad plus the Vendidad. As a result, they contain all 72 chapters of the Yasna, all 24 chapters of the Visperad and the 22 chapters of the Vendidad. They are called Sade, pure, since they do not contain a translation, but only liturgical instructions along the Avestan text. A comprehensive list of all available manuscripts of the Vendidad is provided by Andrés-Toledo and Cantera.

== Content ==
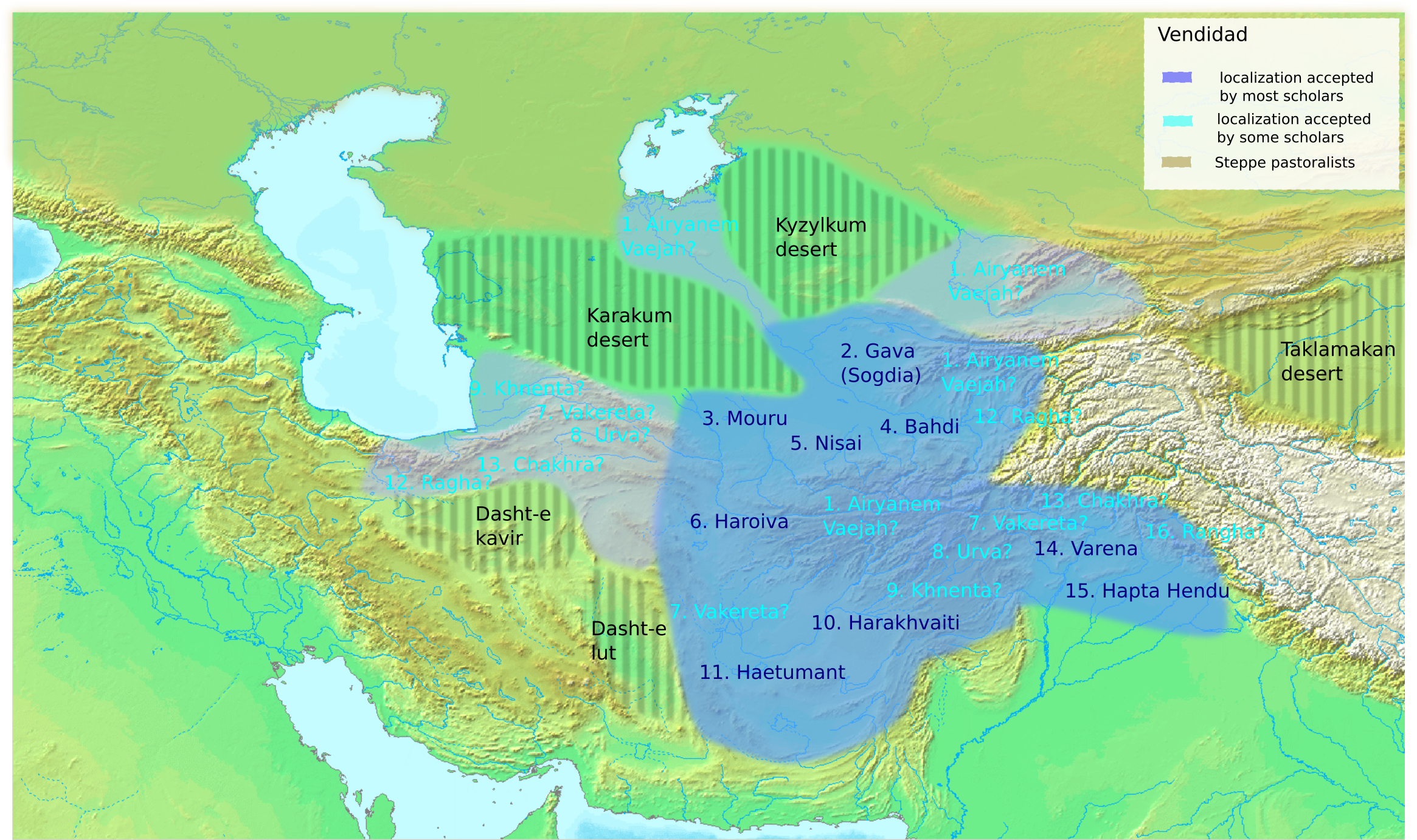
Approximate localization of the regions in the first chapter of the Vendidad. Differences in the scholarly opinions are indicated by color. (Note: Sources for the different localizations are provided in the description of the image.)

The chapters of the Vendidad are bookended by a mythical framing device. The first chapter is, therefore, the Zoroastrian creation myth of Ahura Mazda, followed by the description of the destructive winter of Angra Mainyu. This chapter contains a lengthy description of the world, known to the Avestan people and is therefore an important source for the delination of their geographical horizon. The second chapter recounts the legend of Yima (Jamshid). Chapter 19 relates the temptation of Zoroaster, who, when urged by Angra Mainyu to turn from the good religion, turns instead towards Ahura Mazda. The chapters in between cover diverse rules and regulations, through the adherence of which the daevas may be confounded. Broken down by subject, these fargards deal with the following topics (chapters where a topic is covered are in brackets):

- hygiene (in particular care of the dead) [3, 5, 6, 7, 8, 16, 17, 19] and cleansing [9,10];
- disease, its origin, and spells against it [7, 10, 11, 13, 20, 21, 22];
- mourning for the dead [12], the Towers of Silence [6], and the remuneration of deeds after death [19];
- the sanctity of, and invocations to, Atar (fire) [8], Zam (earth) [3,6], Apas (water) [6, 8, 21] and the light of the stars [21];
- the dignity of wealth and charity [4], of marriage [4, 15] and of physical effort [4]
- statutes on unacceptable social behaviour [15] such as breach of contract [4] and assault [4];
- on the worthiness of priests [18];
- praise and care of the bull [21], the dog [13, 15], the otter [14], the Sraosha bird [18], and the Haoma tree [6].

There is a degree of moral relativism apparent in the Vendidad, and the diverse rules and regulations are not always expressed as being mystical, absolute, universal or mandatory. The Vendidad is mainly about social laws, mores, customs and culture. In some instances, the description of prescribed behaviour is accompanied by a description of the penances that have to be made to atone for violations thereof. Such penances include payment in cash or kind to the aggrieved; corporal punishment such as whipping; as well as repeated recitations of certain parts of the liturgy such as the Ahuna Vairya manthra.

== Editions and translations ==
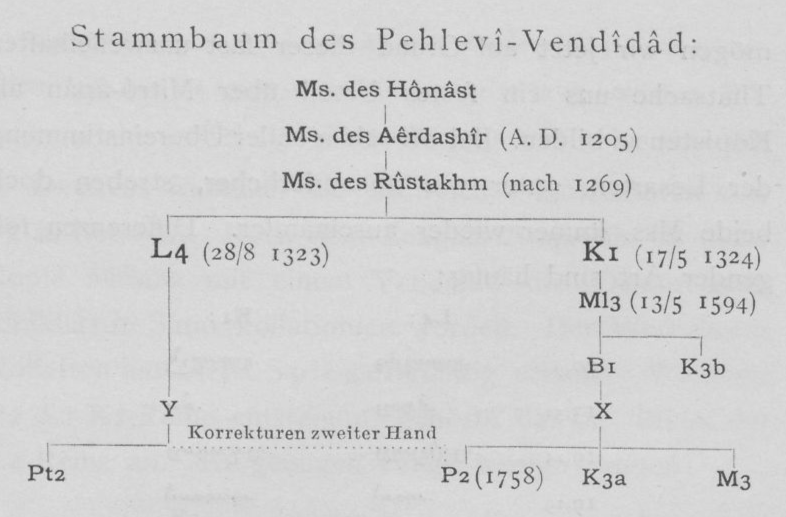
Stemmatics of the Pahlavi Vendidad used by Geldner

The text of the Vendidad was part of the critical editions of the Avesta by Westergaard and Geldner. Of those, the edition by Geldner is considered the reference edition of the text, due to the large number of manuscripts used for his work In his Prologomena, Geldner also provided the standard critical apparatus of the text including a number of stemmatics of different manuscript traditions.

Among the classic translations, the works of Darmesteter and Wolff stand out. Darmesteter provided translations into English and French, while Wolff translated the text into German. Overall, Wollf's work is considered more reliable, but Darmesteter's translation is considered more accessible. More recently, Andrés-Toledo has published a new critical edition of parts of the Vendidad including a critical apparatus.

== Value of the Vendidad among Zoroastrians ==
Most of the Zoroastrians continue to use the Vendidad as a valued and fundamental cultural and ethical moral guide, viewing their teachings as essential to Zoroastrian tradition and see it as part of Zoroastrianism original perspectives about the truth of spiritual existence. They argue that it has origins on early oral tradition, being only later written.

The emergent reformist Zoroastrian movement reject the later writings in the Avesta as being corruptions of Zarathustra's original teachings and thus do not consider the Vendidad as an original Zoroastrian scripture. They argue that it was written nearly 700 years after the death of Zarathustra and interpret the writing as different from the other parts of the Avesta.

An article by Hannah M. G. Shapero summarized the reformist perspective:

"How do Zoroastrians view the Vendidad today? And how many of the laws of the Vendidad are still followed? This depends, as so many other Zoroastrian beliefs and practices do, on whether you are a "reformist" or a "traditionalist." The reformists, following the Gathas as their prime guide, judge the Vendidad harshly as being a deviation from the non-prescriptive, abstract teachings of the Gathas. For them, few if any of the laws or practices in the Vendidad are either in the spirit or the letter of the Gathas, and so they are not to be followed. The reformists prefer to regard the Vendidad as a document which has no religious value but is only of historic or anthropological interest. Many Zoroastrians, in Iran, India, and the world diaspora, inspired by reformists, have chosen to dispense with the Vendidad prescriptions entirely or only to follow those which they believe are not against the original spirit of the Gathas."

== Liturgical use ==
=== Yasht i Visperad abag Videvdad ===
The Vendidad text is used within the Yasht i Visperad abag Videvdad, or simply Videvdad, one of the main variants of the Zoroastrian Long Liturgy. As the name implies, this liturgy consists of a Yasht i Visperad into which the chapters of the Vendidad are intercalated. This intercalation happens during the Old Avestan text in the Staota Yesnya. Its use is connected to purification rituals like the Barashnom or the establishment of an Atash Behram. Nowadays, the Videvdad liturgy is only performed in India.

=== Videvdad Sade ===
The Videvdad liturgy has to be distinguished from another performance of the text, namely the Videvdad Sade performance. This performance is different from the liturgy since it is only performed by a single priest, instead of two in the Videvdad liturgy, and there is no ritual activity. Instead, the priest simply reads the text as given in the Videvdad Sade manuscripts. The performance also does not require the typical levels of ritual purity. Due to this lack of ritual actions, the Videvdad Sade performance has been described as a lengthy prayer.

== See also ==
- Avesta
- Avestan geography
