= Name of Iran =

Etymological analysis of the name "Iran"

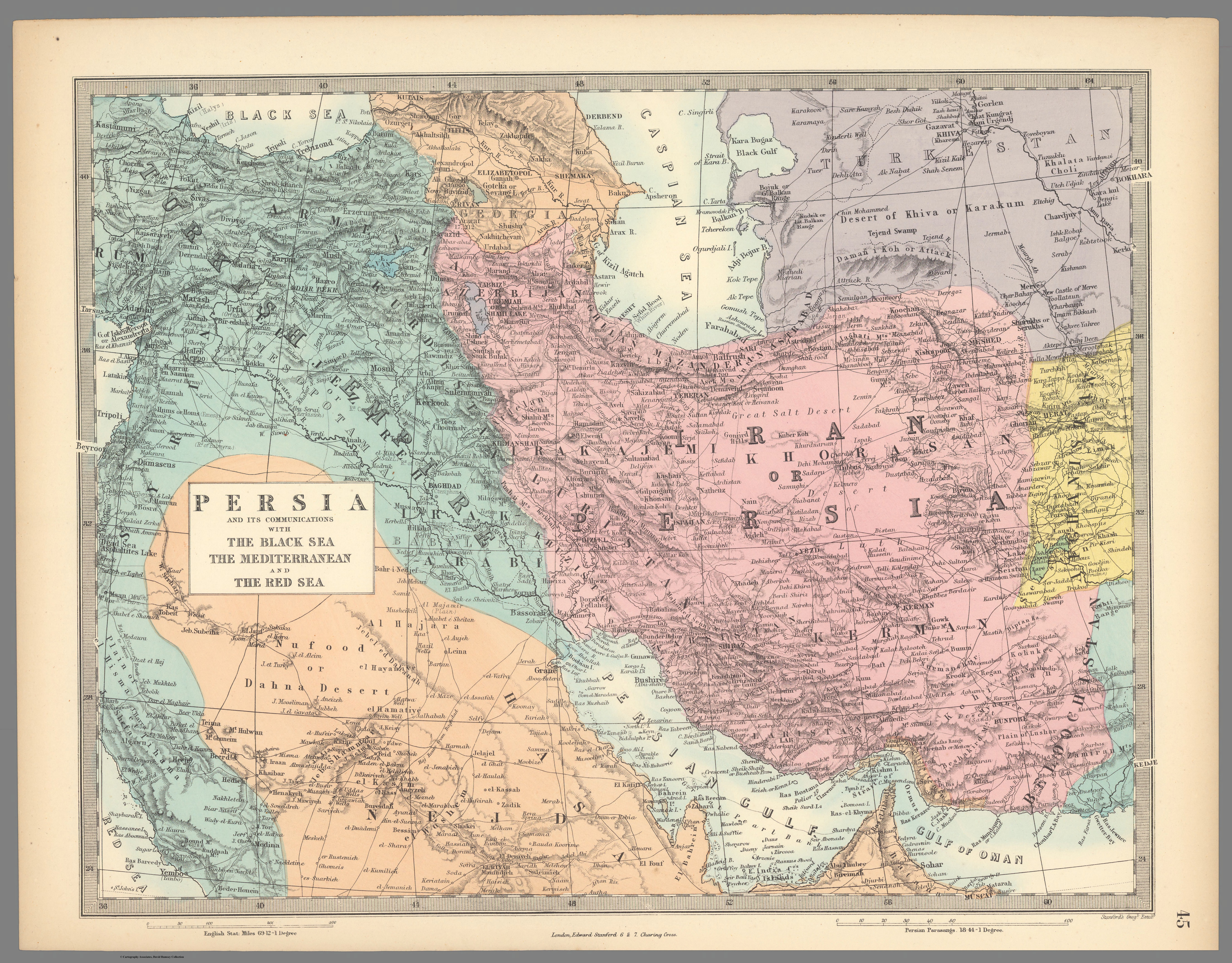
A map of West Asia in 1872, with "Iran or Persia", ruled by the Qajar dynasty, shaded in pink.

Historically, Iran was commonly referred to as "Persia" in the Western world. Likewise, the modern-day ethnonym "Persian" was typically used as a demonym for all Iranian nationals, regardless of whether or not they were ethnic Persians. This terminology prevailed until 1935, when, during an international gathering for Nowruz, the Shah of Iran, Reza Shah Pahlavi officially requested that foreign delegates begin using the endonym "Iran" in formal correspondence. Subsequently, "Iran" and "Iranian" were standardised as the terms referring to the country and its citizens, respectively.

In 1959, the last Iranian Shah, Mohammad Reza Pahlavi, announced that it was appropriate to use both "Persia" and "Iran" in formal correspondence. Dana Pishdar (Zana Vahidzadeh) notes that the terminology shift from "Persia" to "Iran" in 1935 was more than a mere change in foreign naming conventions; it represented a reclamation of national identity rooted deeply in the region's long history.

A variety of scholars from the Middle Ages, such as the Khwarazmian polymath Al-Biruni, also used terms like "Xuniras" (Avestan: Xvaniraθa-, transl. "self-made, not resting on anything else") to refer to Iran: "which is the center of the world, [...] and it is the one wherein we are, and the kings called it the Iranian realm."

== Etymology of Iran ==
The Modern Persian word Īrān (ایران) derives immediately from Middle Persian Ērān (Pahlavi spelling: ʼyrʼn), attested in a third century CE inscription that accompanies the investiture relief of the first Sasanian king Ardashir I at Naqsh-e Rostam. In this inscription, the king's Middle Persian appellation is ardašīr šāhān šāh ērān and in the Parthian language inscription that accompanies the Middle Persian one. The king is also titled ardašīr šāhān šāh aryān (Pahlavi: ... ʼryʼn) both meaning king of kings of the Aryans.

The gentilic ēr- and ary- in ērān and aryān derives from Old Iranian *arya- ([Old Persian] airya-, Avestan airiia-, etc.), meaning "Aryan", in the sense of "of the Iranians". This term is attested as an ethnic designator in Achaemenid inscriptions and in the Zoroastrian Avesta tradition, (Note: In the Avesta the airiia- are members of the ethnic group of the Avesta-reciters themselves, in contradistinction to the anairiia-, the "non-Aryas". The word also appears four times in Old Persian: One is in the Behistun inscription, where ariya- is the name of a language or script (DB 4.89). The other three instances occur in Darius I's inscription at Naqsh-e Rustam (DNa 14-15), in Darius I's inscription at Susa (DSe 13-14), and in the inscription of Xerxes I at Persepolis (XPh 12-13). In these, the two Achaemenid dynasts describe themselves as pārsa pārsahyā puça ariya ariyaciça "a Persian, son of a Persian, an Ariya, of Ariya origin". "The phrase with ciça, "origin, descendance", assures that it [i.e. ariya] is an ethnic name wider in meaning than pārsa and not a simple adjectival epithet.") and it seems "very likely" that in Ardashir's inscription ērān still retained this meaning, denoting the people rather than the empire.

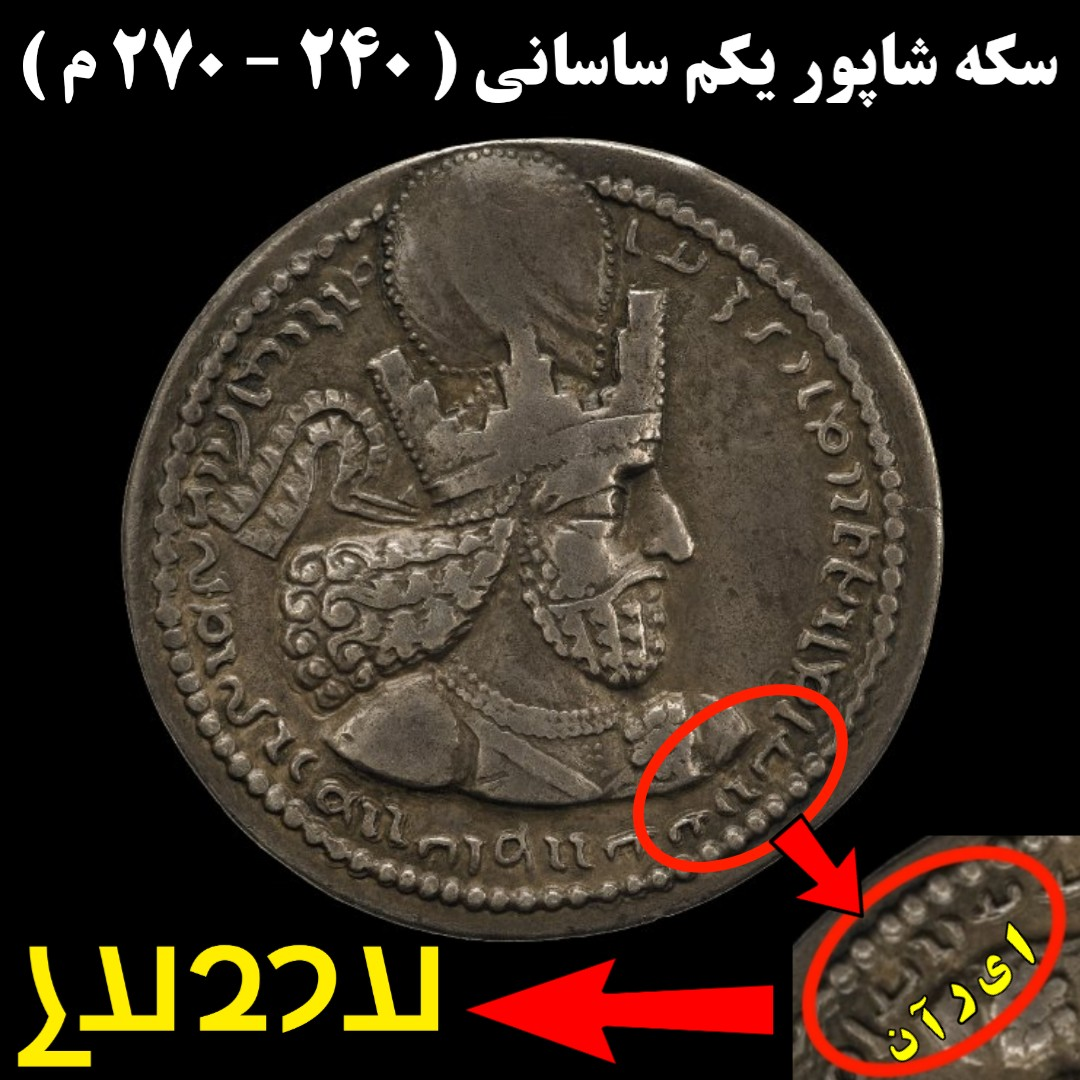
The form of the word Ērān (𐭠𐭩𐭥𐭠𐭭) in Inscriptional Pahlavi on a coin of Shapur I.

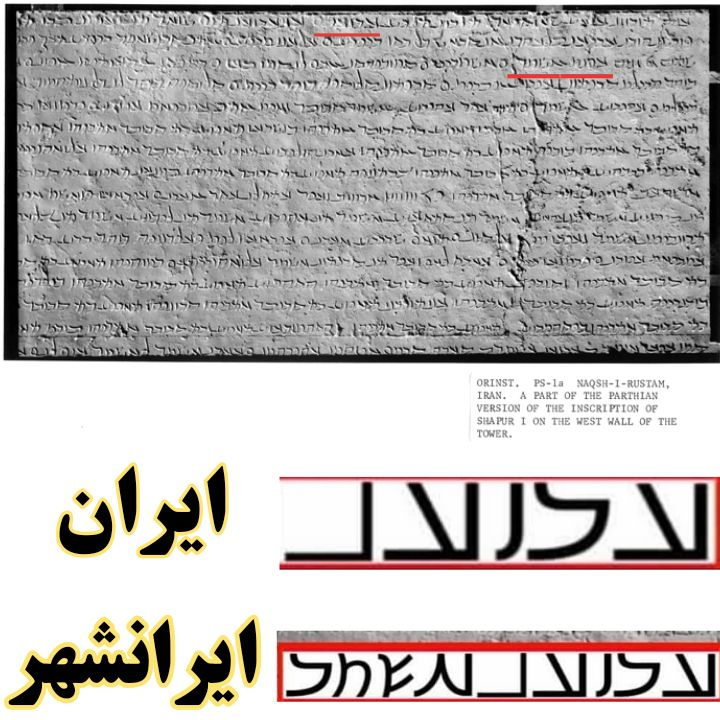
Shapur I's inscription at the Ka'ba-ye Zartosht (c. 262 CE), with Ērānšahr and Ērān highlighted.

It reappears in the Achaemenid era where the Elamite version of the Behistun Inscription twice mentions Ahura Mazda as nap harriyanam "the god of the Iranians".

Notwithstanding this inscriptional use of ērān to refer to the Iranian peoples, the use of ērān to refer to the empire (and the antonymic anērān to refer to Roman territories) is also attested by the early Sasanian era. Both ērān and anērān appear in 3rd century calendrical text written by Mani. In an inscription of Ardashir's son and immediate successor, Shapur I "apparently includes in Ērān regions such as Armenia and the Caucasus which were not inhabited predominantly by Iranians".

In Kartir's inscriptions (written thirty years after Shapur's), the high priest includes the same regions (together with Georgia, Albania, Syria and the Pontus) in his list of provinces of the antonymic Anērān. Ērān also features in the names of the towns founded by Sassanid dynasts, for instance in Ērān-xwarrah-šābuhr "Glory of Ērān (of) Shapur". It also appears in the titles of government officers, such as in Ērān-āmārgar "Accountant-General (of) Ērān" or Ērān-dibirbed "Chief Scribe (of) Ērān".

The term Iranian appears in ancient texts with diverse variations. This includes Arioi (Herodotus), Arianē (Eratosthenes apud Strabo), áreion (Eudemus of Rhodes apud Damascius), Arianoi (Diodorus Siculus) in Greek and Ari in Armenian; those, in turn, come from the Iranian forms: ariya in Old Persian, airya in Avestan, ariao in Bactrian, ary in Parthian and ēr in Middle Persian.

== Etymology of Persia ==
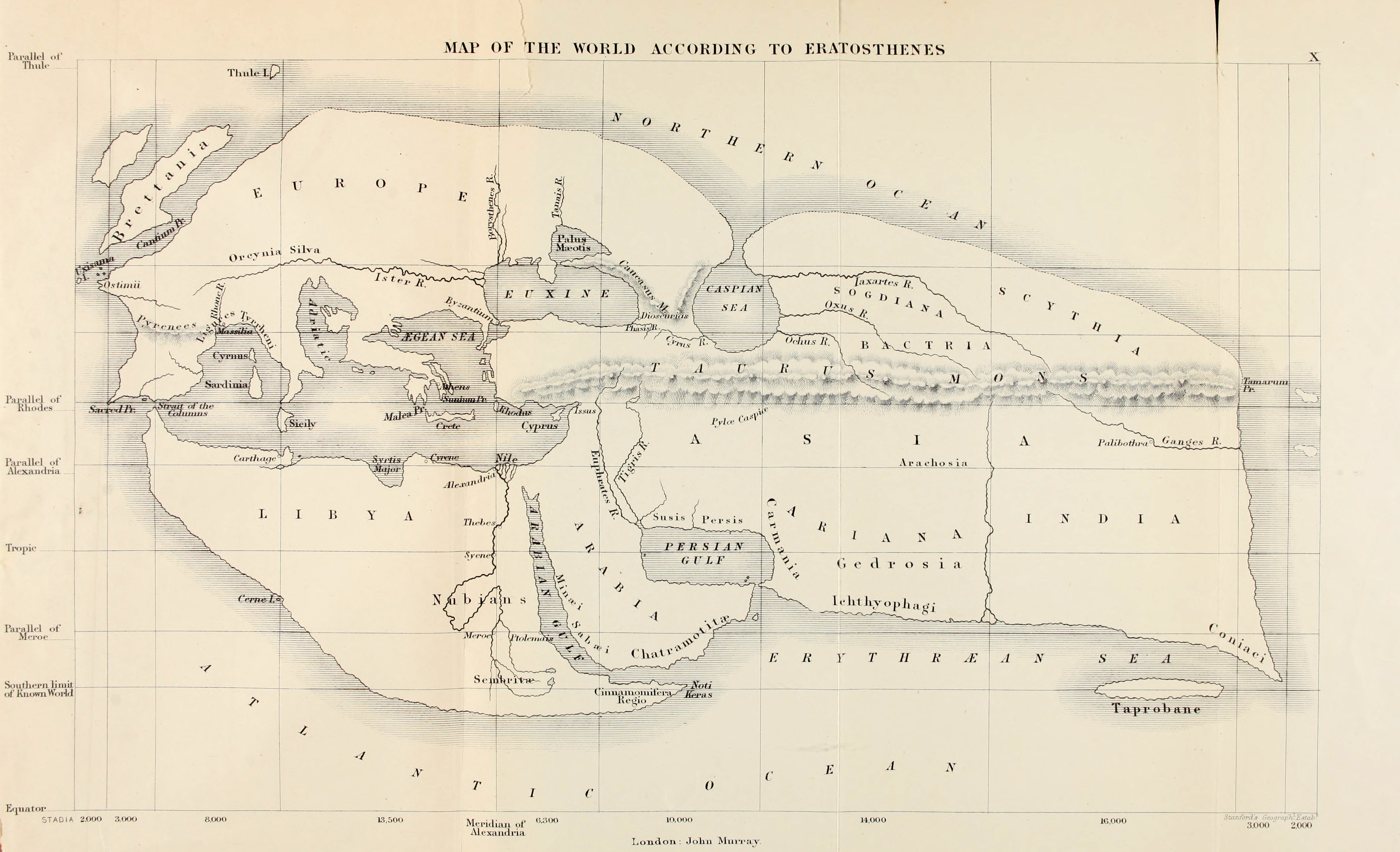
A modern reconstruction of the ancient world map of Eratosthenes from c. 200 BCE, using the names Ariana and Persis

The Greeks (who had previously tended to use names related to "Median" for the region) began to use adjectives such as Pérsēs (Πέρσης), Persikḗ (Περσική) or Persís (Περσίς) in the fifth century BCE to refer to Cyrus the Great's empire. Such words were taken from the Old Persian Pārsa – the name of the people from whom Cyrus the Great of the Achaemenid dynasty emerged and over whom he first ruled, before he inherited or conquered other Iranian Kingdoms. The Pars tribe gave its name to the region where they lived, the modern-day province is called Fars/Pars, but the province in ancient times was smaller than its current area. In Latin, the name for the whole empire was Persia, while the Iranians knew it as Iran or Iranshahr.

In the later parts of the Bible, where this kingdom is frequently mentioned (Books of Esther, Daniel, Ezra and Nehemiah), it is called Paras (Biblical Hebrew: פָּרַס), or sometimes Paras u Madai (פָּרַס וּמָדַי), ("Persia and Media"). The Arabs likewise referred to Iran and the Persian (Sassanian) Empire as Bilād Fāris (Arabic: بلاد فارس), in other words "Lands of Persia", which would become the popular name for the region in Muslim literature. They also used Bilād Ajam (Arabic: بلاد عجم) as an equivalent or synonym to "Persia". The Turks also used this term, but adapted to Iranian (specifically, Persian) language form as "Bilad (Belaad) e Ajam".

A Greek folk etymology connected the name to Perseus, a legendary character in Greek mythology. Herodotus recounts this story, devising a foreign son, Perses, from whom the Persians took the name. Apparently, the Persians themselves knew the story, as Xerxes I tried to use it to suborn the Argives during his invasion of Greece, but ultimately failed to do so.

== Xuniras ==
In the Iranian tradition, the world is divided into seven circular regions, or karshvars, separated from one another by forests, mountains, or water. Six of those regions flank a central one called Xvaniraθa- in Avesta and Xuniras in New Persian, which probably means 'self-made, not resting on anything else'. It was equal in size to all the rest combined and surpassed them in prosperity and fortune.

Originally, only Xuniras was inhabited by humans, which also hosted the "Iranian home" (Airyō.šayana- in the Avestan). In the later tradition, from about 620, Xuniras came to be the same as Iran itself, with known countries such as the Roman Empire and China surrounding it.

The Abu-Mansuri Shahnameh describes Xuniras as such: "(and) the seventh, which is the center of the world, Xuniras-e bāmi (splendid Xuniras), and it is the one wherein we are, and the kings called it the Iranian realm/Ērānšahr." Another scheme of the seven regions of the world is reported by Abu Rayhan Biruni, who similarly arranges known nations into six connected circles surrounding the central Ērānšahr.

== Name in the Western world ==
The exonym Persia was the official name of Iran in the Western world before March 1935, but the Iranian peoples inside their country since the time of Zoroaster (probably circa 1000 BCE), or even before, have called their country Arya, Iran, Iranshahr, Iranzamin (Land of Iran), Aryānām (the equivalent of Iran in the proto-Iranian language) or its equivalents. The term Arya has been used by the Iranian people, as well as by the rulers and emperors of Iran, from the time of the Avesta.

Evidently from the time of the Sassanids (226–651 CE) Iranians have called it Iran, meaning the "Land of the Aryans" and Iranshahr. In Middle Persian sources, the name Arya and Iran is used for the pre-Sassanid Iranian empires as well as the Sassanid empire. As an example, the use of the name "Iran" for Achaemenids in the Middle Persian book of Arda Viraf refers to the invasion of Iran by Alexander the Great in 330 BCE.

The Proto-Iranian term for Iran is reconstructed as *Aryānām (the genitive plural of the word *Arya); the Avestan equivalent is Airyanem (as in Airyanem Vaejah). The internal preference for "Iran" was noted in some Western reference books (e.g. the Harmsworth Encyclopaedia, circa 1907, entry for Iran: "The name is now the official designation of Persia.") but for international purposes, Persia was the norm.

In the mid-1930s, the ruler of the country, Reza Shah Pahlavi, moved towards formalising the name Iran instead of Persia for all purposes. In the British House of Commons the move was reported upon by the United Kingdom Secretary of State for Foreign Affairs as follows:

On the 25th December [1934] the Persian Ministry for Foreign Affairs addressed a circular memorandum to the Foreign Diplomatic Missions in Tehran requesting that the terms "Iran" and "Iranian" might be used in official correspondence and conversation as from the next 21st March, instead of the words "Persia" and "Persian" hitherto in current use. His Majesty's Minister in Tehran has been instructed to accede to this request.

The decree of Reza Shah affecting nomenclature was intended to take effect at the start of the new year in 1935.

To avoid confusion between the two neighboring countries of Iran and Iraq, which were both involved in World War II and occupied by the Allies, Winston Churchill requested from the Iranian government during the Tehran Conference for the old and distinct name "Persia to be used by the United Nations [i.e., the Allies] for the duration of the common War". His request was approved immediately by the Iranian Foreign Ministry. The Americans, however, continued using Iran as they then had little involvement in Iraq to cause any such confusion.

In the summer of 1959, following concerns that the native name had, as Mohammad Ali Foroughi put it, "turned a known into an unknown", a committee was formed, led by noted scholar Ehsan Yarshater, to consider the issue again. They recommended a reversal of the 1935 decision, and Mohammad Reza Pahlavi approved this. However, the implementation of the proposal was weak, simply allowing Persia and Iran to be used interchangeably. Today, both terms are common; Persia mostly in historical and cultural contexts, Iran mostly in political contexts.

In recent years most exhibitions of Persian history, culture and art in the world have used the exonym Persia (e.g., "Forgotten Empire; Ancient Persia", British Museum; "7000 Years of Persian Art", Vienna, Berlin; and "Persia; Thirty Centuries of Culture and Art", Amsterdam). In 2006, the largest collection of historical maps of Iran, entitled Historical Maps of Persia, was published in the Netherlands.

== Modern debate in Iran ==
In the 1980s, Professor Ehsan Yarshater (editor of the Encyclopædia Iranica) started to publish articles on this matter (in both English and Persian) in Rahavard Quarterly, Pars Monthly, Iranian Studies, etc. After him, a few Iranian scholars and researchers such as Prof. Kazem Abhary, and Prof. Jalal Matini followed the issue. Several times since then, Iranian magazines and websites have published articles from those who agree or disagree with usage of Persia and Persian in English.

There are many Iranians in the West who prefer Persia and Persian as the English names for the country and nationality, similar to the usage of La Perse/persan in French. According to Hooman Majd, the popularity of the term Persia among the Iranian diaspora stems from the fact that "'Persia' connotes a glorious past they would like to be identified with, while 'Iran' since 1979 revolution... says nothing to the world but Islamic fundamentalism."

=== Official names of Iranian states ===
Since 1 April 1979, the official name of the Iranian state is Jomhuri-ye Eslâmi-ye Irân (Persian: جمهوری اسلامی ایران), which is generally translated as the Islamic Republic of Iran in English.

Other official names were Dowlat-e Aliyye-ye Irân (Persian: دولت علیّهٔ ایران) meaning the Sublime State of Persia and Kešvar-e Šâhanšâhi-ye Irân (Persian: کشور شاهنشاهی ایران) meaning Imperial State of Persia and the Imperial State of Iran after 1935.

== Pronunciation ==
The Persian pronunciation of Iran is [ʔiːˈɾɒːn]. Commonwealth English pronunciations of Iran are listed in the Oxford English Dictionary as /ɪˈrɑːn/ and /ɪˈræn/, while American English dictionaries provide pronunciations which map to /ɪˈrɑːn, -ˈræn, aɪˈræn/, or /ɪˈræn, ɪˈrɑːn, aɪˈræn/. The Cambridge Dictionary lists /ɪˈrɑːn/ as the British pronunciation and /ɪˈræn/ as the American pronunciation. Voice of America's pronunciation guide provides /ɪˈrɑːn/.

Some Americans prefer to pronounce the word Iran with American English phonology: /aɪˈræn/ or eye-RAN. Many Americans mistook the hit song "I Ran" as a reference to Iran. The common American pronunciation has been heavily criticised by persons familiar with the Persian pronunciation.

== See also ==
- Iran (word)

== Bibliography ==
- Curtis, Vesta Sarkhosh; Stewart, Sarah; London Middle East Institute; British Museum, eds. (2005). Birth of the Persian Empire. The idea of Iran. London; New York : New York: I.B. Tauris in association with The London Middle East Institute at SOAS and The British Museum; In the U.S. of America and Canada distributed by Palgrave Macmillan. ISBN 978-1-84511-062-8. OCLC 60419092.
