= Avestan geography =

Compilation of the geographical references in Avesta

- Region
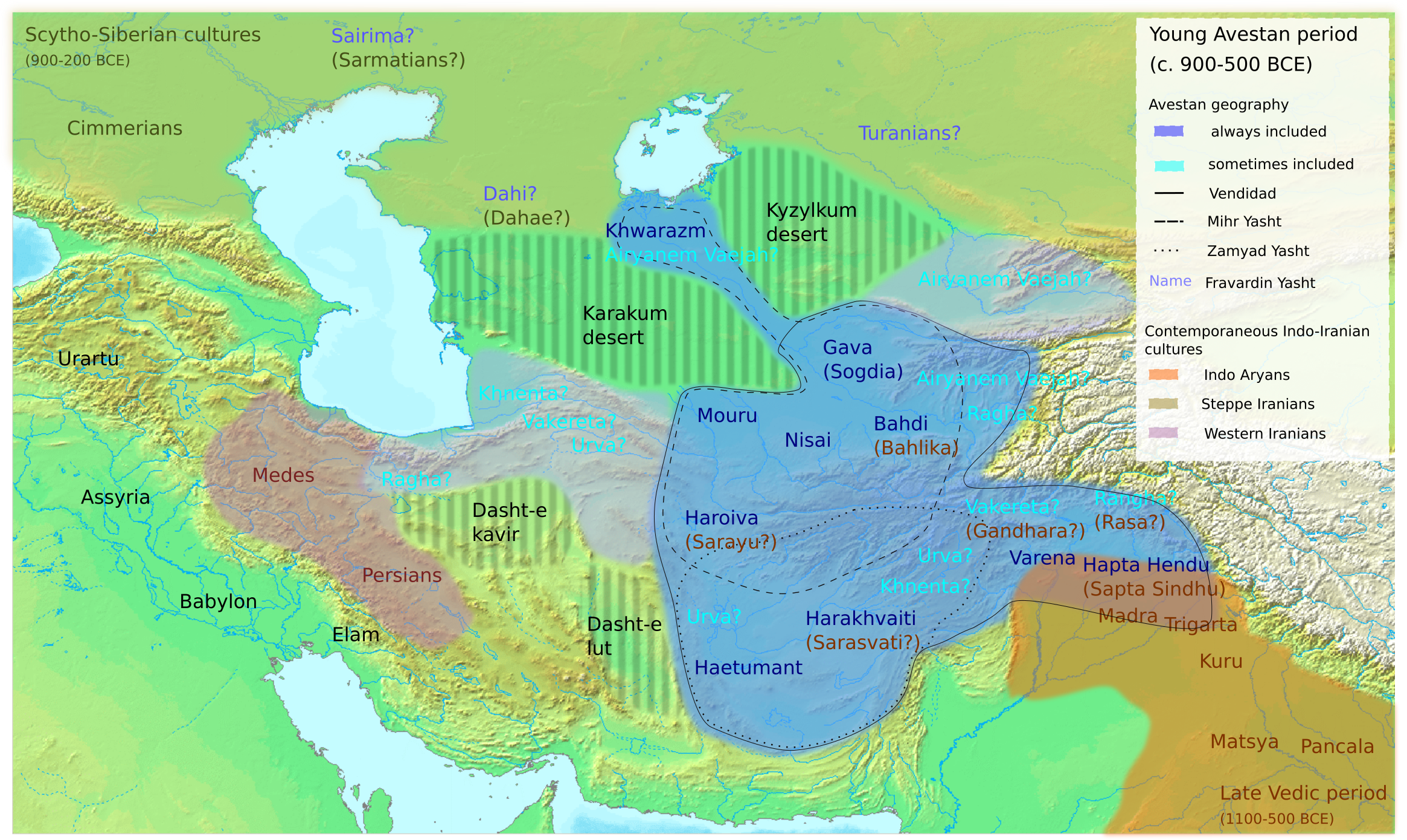
- Geographical horizon of the Avestan people
- Countries: Afghanistan; Tajikistan; Turkmenistan; Iran; Pakistan; India
- Demonym: Iranians

Avestan geography is the investigation of place names in the Avesta and the attempt to connect them to real-world geographical sites. It is connected to but different from the cosmogony expressed in the Avesta, where place names primarily refer to mythical events or a cosmological order.

Identifying such connections is important for localizing the people of the Avesta and is therefore crucial for understanding the early history of Zoroastrianism and the Iranians. Sources for such geographical references are exclusively found in the younger Avestan portion of the text, in particular in the Vendidad and several of the Yashts. The identification of these Avestan places with real locations is often supported by comparisons with references made in later Iranian sources.

A major challenge to establish these connections is the fact that the Iranian people often used the same name for different places. As a result, not all Avestan place names can be identified with certainty with present-day locations and therefore remain subject to debate. Modern scholarship, however, agrees that the place names in the Avesta are concentrated in the eastern regions of Greater Iran up to the Indo-Iranian border.

== Vendidad references ==
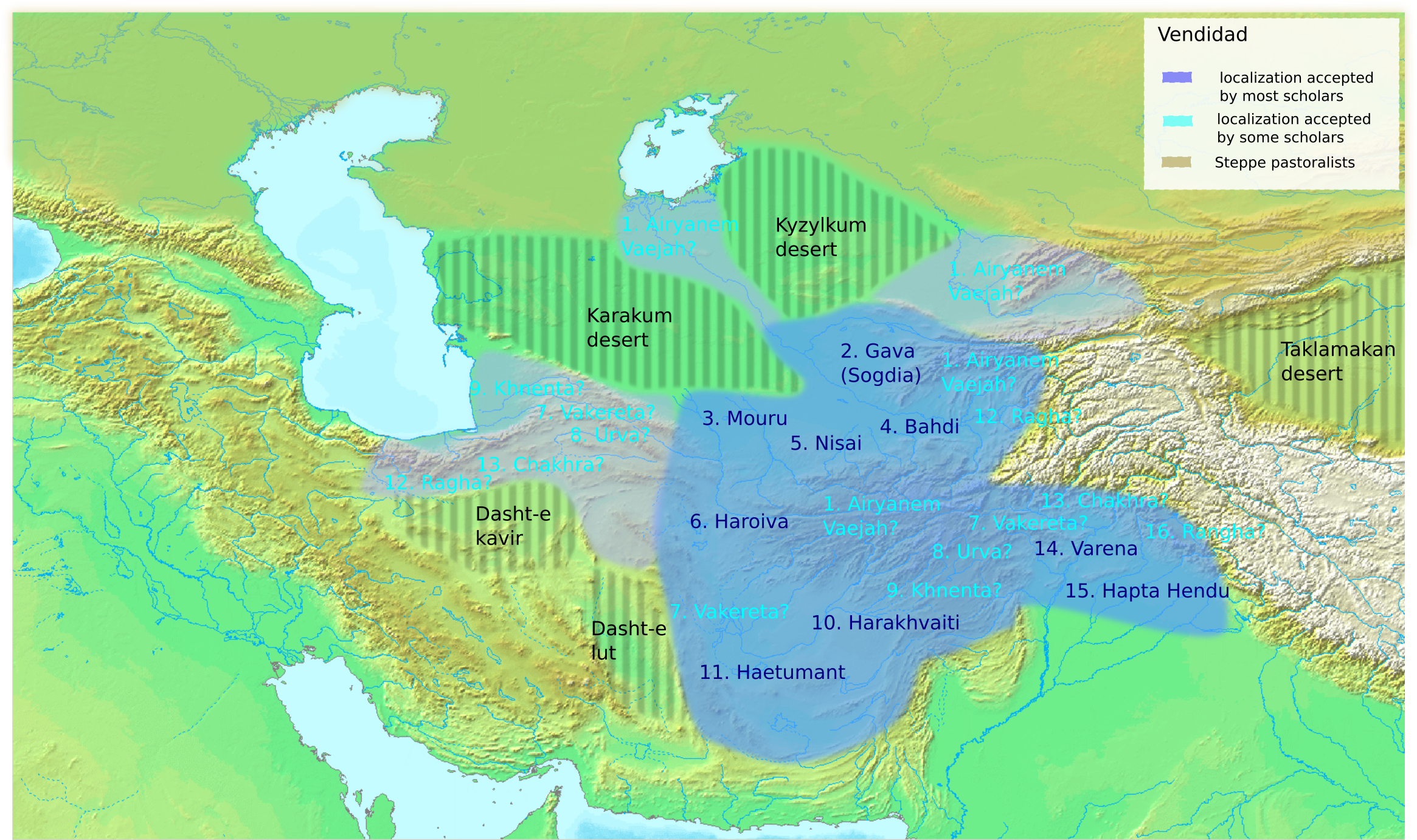
Approximate localization of the regions in the Vendidad. Differences in the scholarly opinions are indicated by color. (Note: Sources for the different localizations are provided in the description of the image.)

The main Avestan text of geographical interest is the first chapter of the Vendidad (Avestan: vi.daēwa.dāta, 'The Law repudiating the Deavas'). It consists of a list of the sixteen good lands (asah) and countries (šōiθra) created by Ahura Mazda. Each country is introduced with a verse describing its Ohrmazdian characteristic, followed by one describing the corresponding counter-creation (paityāra) by Angra Mainyu. The only exceptions are the first and eleventh country on the list where two verses explain its Ahrimanic counter-creation:

The first of the good lands and countries which I, Ahura Mazda, created, was the Airyanem Vaejah, by the good river Daitya.
Thereupon came Angra Mainyu, who is all death, and he counter-created the serpent in the river and winter, a work of the Deavas.

There are ten winter months there, two summer months; and those are cold for the waters, cold for the earth, cold for the trees.
Winter falls there, with the worst of all plagues.

The second of the good lands and countries which I, Ahura Mazda, created, was the Gava, inhabited by the Sogdians.
Thereupon came Angra Mainyu, who is all death, and he counter-created the locust, which brings death unto cattle and plants.

...

The sixteenth of the good lands and countries which I, Ahura Mazda, created, was the land by the floods of the Rangha, where people live who have no chiefs.
Thereupon came Angra Mainyu, who is all death, and he counter-created winter, a work of the Daevas.

— Vendidad 5.33 - 5.35 (translated by James Darmesteter).

Early Pahlavi sources have traditionally located many of these countries in the western Iranian regions; a tendency that was followed by much of 20th century scholarship. This changed with the work of Gherardo Gnoli who argued that all place names in the Vendidad are located in the eastern part of Greater Iran, i.e. centered around modern day Afghanistan and Tajikistan. Since then, a number of revisions of Gnoli's work have been proposed, often attempting to derive the position of the more uncertain place names from an assumed arrangement according to which countries appear in the list. The following list presents these place names and discusses the different localization attempts made by scholars throughout the years:

1. Airyanem Vaejah, by the good river Daitya (airiianəm vaẽjō vahuii dåitiiaii): The identity of both Airyanem Vaejah and the river Daitya are not universally agreed upon. Iranian sources have traditionally located Aryanem Vaejah in around Azerbaijan, a hypothesis that was shared, e.g., by James Darmesteter and Ernst Herzfeld,. In contrast, historians such as Walter Bruno Henning, Josef Markwart, and Mary Boyce believe its location to be in Chorasmia or northeast Iran around the Aral Sea and the Oxus River. Yet according to Michael Witzel, Airyanem Vaejah should be located at the center of the sixteen lands, specifically in what are now the central Afghan highlands (around modern Bamyan Province). One of arguments in favor of locating Airyanem Vaejah in central Afghanistan is that a mountainous region explains its severe climate (Vd. 1.2.3) better than does its supposed location in Chorasmia. According to Gnoli, it was situated between the Helmand River and the Hindu Kush Mountains, while historians like Skjaervo have declared the localization of Airyanem Vaejah to be unsolveable.
2. Gava, inhabited by the Sogdians (gāum yim suγδō.šaiianəm): The toponym Gava appears twice in the Avesta. Each time it is connected with the Sogdians and it is consequently identified with the region of Sogdia. While the place name Gava remains elusive, Vogelsang connects it with Gabae, a Sogdian stronghold in western Sogdia and speculates that during the time of the Avesta, the center of Sogdia may have been closer to Bukhara instead of Samarkand.
3. Mouru the just (mōurum sūrəm): This toponym is universally identified with Margiana, a historical region located in the eastern portion of Turkmenistan.
4. Bahdi the beautiful with uplifted banners (båxδīm srīrąm ərəδβō.drafšąm): Likewise, Bahdi is universally identified with Bactria, a historical region around the city of Balkh located mostly in today's Afghanistan.
5. Nisai between Mouru and Bahdi (nisåim yim antarə mōurum-ca båxδīm-ca): The Vendidad states that Nisai is located between Margiana and Bactria, which would place it somewhere near to today's Faryab Province. However, some historians have also proposed a more western location centered around Nisa in modern day southern Turkmenistan or Neyshabur in north-eastern Iran.
6. Haroiva with vis harezanem (harōiiūm yim viš.harəzanəm): The meaning of 'vis harezanem' is unclear, yet the name Haroiva continues in the modern city of Herat as well as the name of Aria, the satrapy that was centered around this city. The name Haroiva also appears as Sarayu, a Vedic river in India.
7. Vakereta, inhabited by the Duzhaka (vaẽkərətəm yim dužakō.šaiianəm): Early Pahlavi sources identify this country with the Kabul region. Modern scholarship mostly identifies Vakereta with the nearby region of Gandhara. Diverting from this widely shared localization, Witzel places it close to Gorgan.
8. Urva rich in pastures (uruuąm pouru.våstrąm): The exact location of Urva is unknown. Gnoli proposed Ghazni, while Darmesteter believed it to be Urgench in modern day Uzbekistan.
9. Khnenta, inhabited by the Vehrkana (xnəntẽm yim vəhrkånō.šaiianəm): This place name is not found in any historical sources, but the Vehrkana are often connected with the Hyrcanians and Khnenta is, therefore, identified with Hyrcania. However, Gnoli connects the name with the Barkanioi, a tribe mentioned by Ctesias and places Khnenta north of the Hindukush. On the other hand, Grenet connects the name Vehrkana with the town Urgun south of the Hindukush.
10. Harakhvaiti the beautiful (haraxᵛaitīm srīrąm): This name appears during the Achaemenid Empire as Harauvatish and was known to the Greeks as Arachosia, a historical region centered around the valley of the Arghandab River in modern-day southern Afghanistan. The name also appears as Sarasvati, a Vedic river in India. It has been noted that the name of Harakhvaiti found in the Avesta differs from a reconstructed correct Avestan form *haranᵛhaitīm and therefore may reflect a local dialect.
11. Haetumant possessing the Khvarenah (haētumantəm raẽuuantəm xᵛarənanhantəm): Haetumant is the region of Helmand River, which derives its name from it and roughly corresponds to the Achaemenian region of Drangiana, which later became known as Sistan under the Sassanians.
12. Ragha of the three tribes (raγąm θrizantūm): Classic Pahlavi commentary identified Ragha with Median Ragā (modern day Rey in Tehran province) and therefore placed it in western Iran. Following Gnoli, however, modern localization attempts often place it in Afghanistan, whereas others still support its traditional localization in western Iran.
13. Chakhra the strong, supporting the religious order (caxrəm sūrəm asauuanəm): The location of Chakhra is still uncertain, but Darmesteter believes the location is Čarx between Ghaznī and Kabul, in the valley of Lōgar, whereas Grenet identifies Chakhra with the Chitral valley.
14. Varena with four corners (varənəm yim caθru.gaošəm): The location of Varena has been disputed. Michael Witzel suggests identifying it with Varṇu, mentioned by Pāṇini, corresponding to present-day Bannu region of Khyber Pakhtunkhwa, Pakistan. He places Varena within the eastern geographical framework of the Vendidad, south of Kabul. This identification is also notable for the geography of the Bannu basin, a fertile, oasis-like plain bounded by the Sulaiman mountains to the north and west, the Khattak range to the east, and the sandy Marwat plains to the south. It's distinctive natural boundaries may be relavant to the Avestan description of Varena as "four-cornered". Gherardo Gnoli, on the other hand, identifies Varena with moden Buner, between the Indus River and the Swat region. The traditional identification places it in mountainous Gilan, regarded as the birthplace of Zahhak, who was defeated by Thraetaona. This localization was accepted by Pahlavists and Iranian Academia.
15. Hapta Hendu (hapta həndu, Vsn. Sapta Sindhava, 'seven rivers'): Beginning with Pahlavi tradition, Hapta Hendu has been interpreted as referring to Punjab plus the Kabul River and the Indus River, a tradition that is shared by the vast majority of modern scholars.
16. The land by the floods of the Rangha, where people live who have no chiefs (upa aodaẽšu rahaii yōi asårō aiβiiåxšaiieinti): Like the first country on the list, Airyanem Vaejah, the last country Rangha is also afflicted by the same evil plague; the Deava-created winter. This makes a location in the north or the mountains plausible. The name Rangha is widely interpreted as the Avestan counterpart of the Rasā, a semi-mystical river known from Vedic geography. Like Airyanem Vaejah, the place name Rangha and its associated river are, therefore, sometimes interpreted to be both a mythological and a geographical location.

In summary, there is a broad consensus regarding about half of the lands on this list, while Vakereta, Urva, Khnenta, Ragha, Chakhra and Varena are disputed to varying degrees. Airyanem Vaejah and Rangha, however, remain the most debated items. This is because these two place names may not only be geographical locations, but can also be interpreted as part of Iranian cosmology. This is due to the elusive description of both countries, the fact that they start and end the list, the fact that they are both characterized by the same Deava-created winter, and the fact that they are both connected with a mythical river. As regards Airyanem Vaejah, it has been interpreted as "the traditional homeland" or "the ancient homeland" of the Iranians. These definitions perpetuate interpretations of the Airyanem Vaejah as Urheimat des Awestavolkes, Urland of the Indo-Iranians or the Wiege aller iranischen Arier.

== Yasht references ==
While the first chapter of the Vendidad contains the longest and most elaborate geographical description in the Avesta, several of the Yashts (Avestan: yašt, 'prayer, honor') contain additional information. Of particular interest here are the Mihr Yasht, the Farvardin Yasht, and the Zamyad Yasht, in which a number of passages mention geographically relevant features such as mountains, regions, peoples, and rivers in various contexts.

=== Mihr Yasht ===
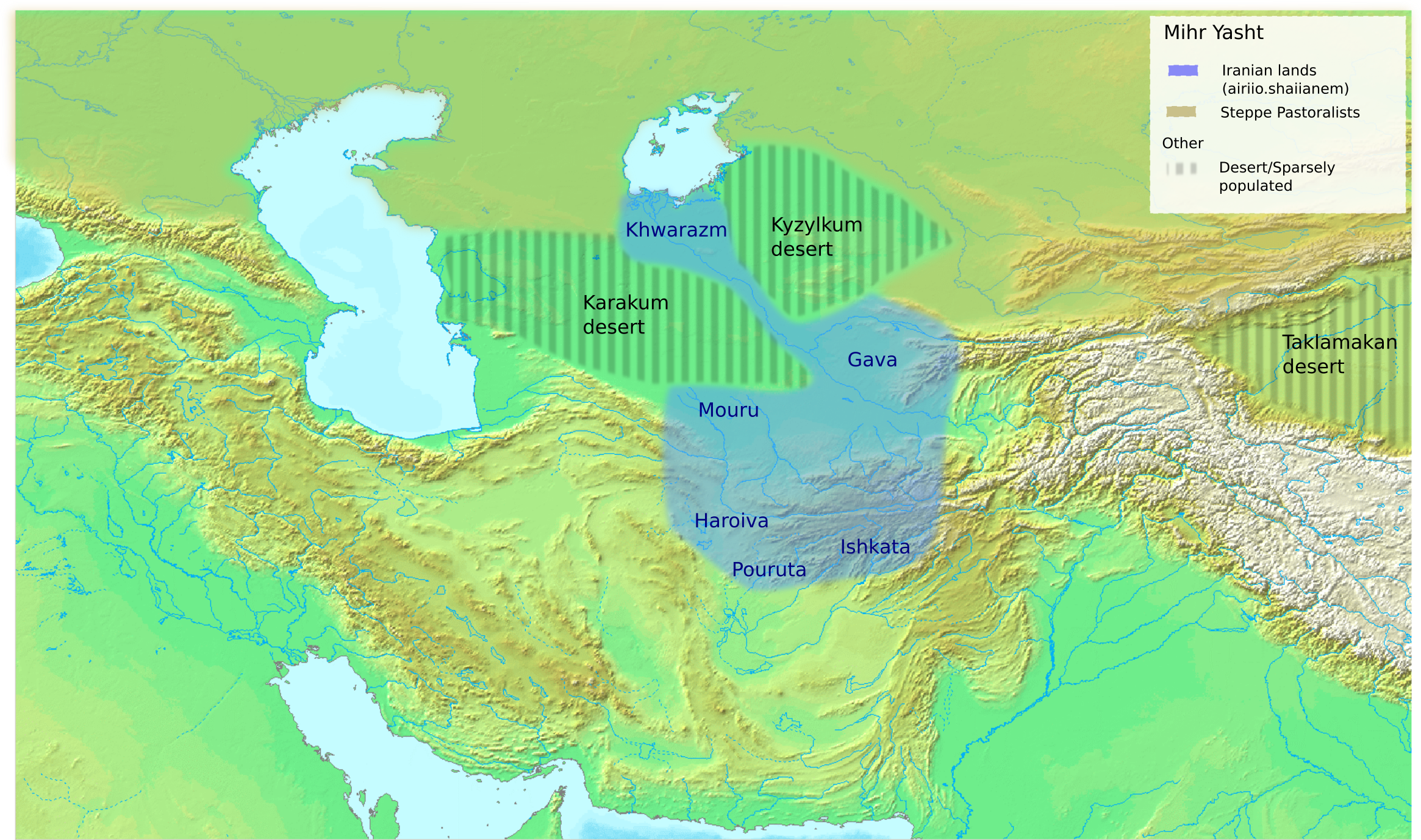
Approximate location of the place names mentioned in the Mihr Yasht of the Avesta

The Mihr Yasht is the second longest of the Yashts and is dedicated to the Zoroastrian deity Mithra (Avestan: miθra, 'covenant'). In it, a second list of Iranian countries is presented, albeit being shorter than the one in the Vendidad. The list is found in verses Yt. 10.12-10.14, where the text describes how Mithra reaches Mount Hara and looks at the entirety of the Iranian lands (airiio.shaiianem):

Grass-land magnate Mithra we worship ...;

who is the first supernatural god to approach across the Hara,
in front of the immortal swift-horsed sun;
who is the first to seize the beautiful gold-painted mountain tops;
from there the most mighty surveys the whole land inahbitated by the Iranians;

where gallant rulers organize many attacks,
where high, sheltering mountains with ample pasture provide solicitous for cattle;
where deep lakes stand with surging waves;
where navigable rivers rush with wide a swell
towards Parutian Ishkata, Haraivian Margu, Sogdian Gava, and Chorasmia.

— Mihr Yasht 10.12–14 (translated by Ilya Gershovitch).

The middle items on this list, namely Haraivian Margu, and Sogdian Gava, are also found in the list of the Vendidad, whereas Chorasmia (xᵛāirizəm, 'nourishing land') is a historical region south of the Aral lake. This leaves Ishkata (iškatā) and Pouruta (pourutā) to be identified. The place name Ishkata is mentioned several times in the Avesta. While in Yt. 193 and Yt. 10.11, Ishkata refers to a mountain in the Hindu Kush, the term in Yt. 11.14 has been interpreted as referring to the land dominated by this mountain. Ilya Gershevitch has, for instance, argued that it should be located in the upper Helmand plain close to the Koh-i-Baba. Pouruta on the other hand has been connected to the Parautoi mentioned by Ptolemy; a tribe that lived close to the Hindu Kush in the Ghor (gairi, "mountain") region.

Compared with the list in the Vendidad, a substantial overlap is visible. Overall, however, the area described is smaller. If Airyanem Vaejah can be located in Khwarazm, then the northern border of the two lists would coincide. Regardless, the area described in the Vendidad extends further east, south and, depending on the identification of some place names, west. The causes for this difference are not known but it may reflect Iranian/Zoroastrian movements over time.

=== Fravardin Yasht ===
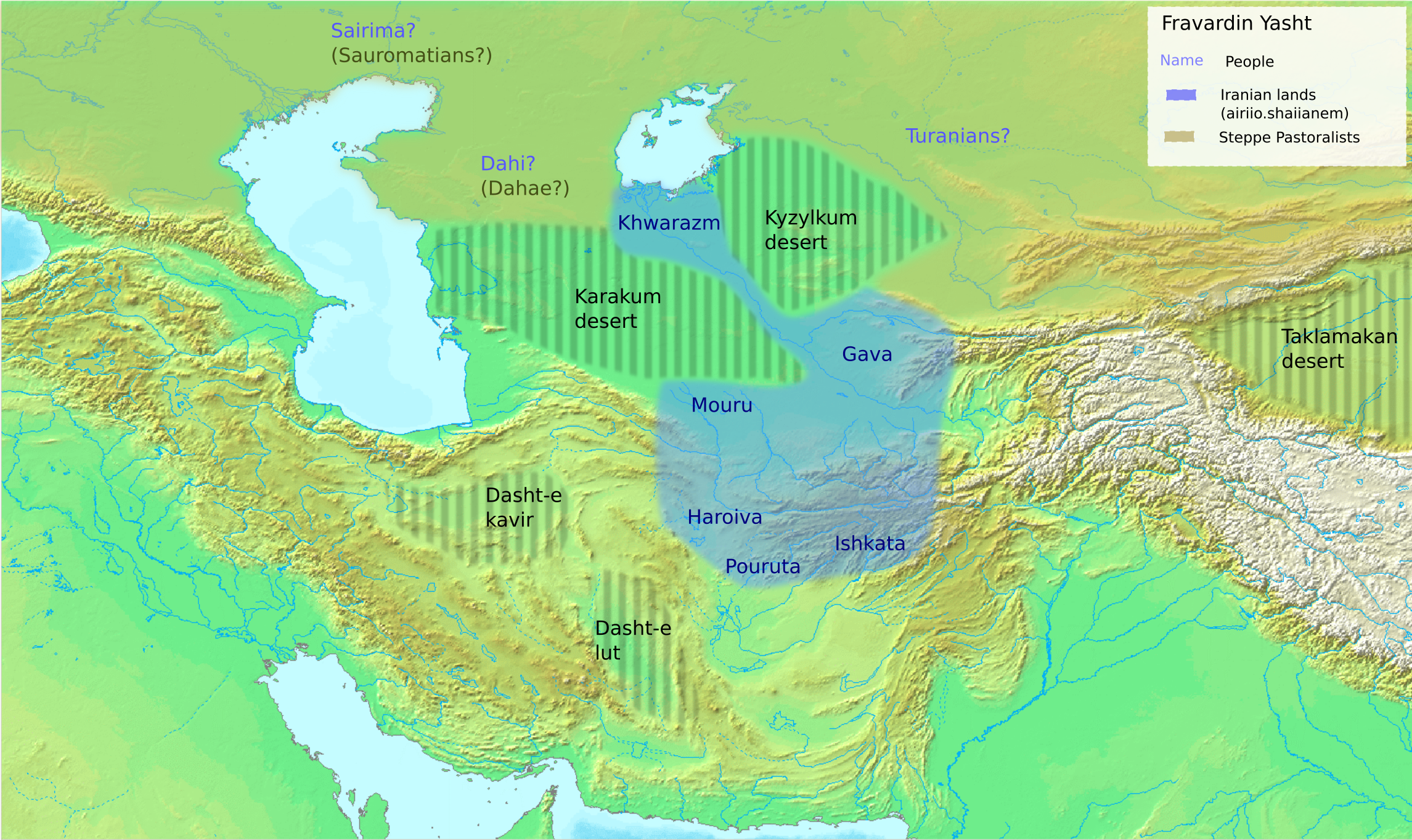
Approximate location of the peoples mentioned in the Frawardin Yasht, namely the Iranians (as described in the Mihr Yasht), Turanians, Sairima and Daha.

The Frawardin Yasht is the longest of the Yashts and is dedicated to the veneration of the Fravashi, a unique Zoroastrian concept similar to and connected with the concept of the soul (urvan). In Yt. 13.143-44, the Fravashi of the righteous living in the lands of five different peoples are praised:

We worship the Fravashis of the holy men in the Aryan countries;
We worship the Fravashis of the holy women in the Aryan countries.
We worship the Fravashis of the holy men in the Turanian countries;
We worship the Fravashis of the holy women in the Turanian countries.
We worship the Fravashis of the holy men in the Sairimyan countries;
We worship the Fravashis of the holy women in the Sairimyan countries.

We worship the Fravashis of the holy men in the Saini countries;
We worship the Fravashis of the holy women in the Saini countries.
We worship the Fravashis of the holy men in the Dahi countries;
We worship the Fravashis of the holy women in the Dahi countries.
We worship the Fravashis of the holy men in all countries;
We worship the Fravashis of the holy women in all countries.

— Frawardin Yasht 13.143-44 (translated by James Darmesteter).

The Arya (airiia, 'Iranians') are the main ethnic group mentioned in the Avesta, where they are typically equated with the Zoroastrian community in general. This ethnic epithet appears both in the Avesta as well as in early Iranian history as the self designation of the Iranian people. This interpretation is, however, context specific, since all people mentioned in the Avesta appear to be speakers of Iranian languages and would therefore be Iranian in a linguistic sense. Moreover, the term Arya (Sanskrit: ārya) also appears in ancient India as the self-designation of the people of the Vedas. The Arya of the Vedas show many similarities with the Arya of the Avesta and must have formed a single people at one point. Their relationship at the time of the Avesta is, however, unknown.

The Turya (tūiriia, 'Turanians') are the second major ethnic group mentioned in the Avesta. They are commonly known as the Turanians from later Pahlavi sources as well as Iranian legend. While some Turanians in the Fravardin Yasht are depicted as faithful followers of Ahura Mazda, most passages in the Avesta as well as later Iranian tradition depicts them in a consistently antagonistic role. Their homeland is typically located in Transoxiania. After Turkic peoples began to spread in Central Asia, the term Turanian was increasingly applied to them. Regardless, the Turanians at the time of the Avesta were Iranian.

The Sarima are mentioned only in the Fravardin Yasht and do not appear in other parts of the Avesta. Their name, however, is found in later traditions involving the mythological ancestors of the Arya, the Turya and the Sarima. In these traditions, a figure known as Sarm, in Pahlavi texts, and Salm, in the Shahname, is given the western part of the known world to rule over. In addition, their name has been connected to the later Sarmatians based on etymological grounds. The Sarmatians were an Iranian speaking tribe that came into contact with the Greeks in the western steppe during classical antiquity but their origins are assumed to be in the southern Ural region.

The Saini are the forth group of people mentioned in the Fravardin Yasht. They do not appear in other parts of the Avesta or in later Iranian tradition. Nor are any later groups known from historical sources to be associated with them. As a result, their identity remains unclear.

The Daha are the last people being mentioned in the Fravardin Yasht. They appear as the Dahae in later historical sources. The Dahae were an Iranian speaking tribe which in antiquity lived modern day Turkmenistan. In addition to the Dahae, the name of the Daha appears as the Dasa in the Vedas, where they are described as non-Aryan adversaries of the Vedic Aryans. It is not known whether these etymological connections support an ethnic connections as well.

Taken together, the available evidence points to these other peoples being Iranian tribes living in the steppes north of the Aryas. A memory of this kinship between them may be found in the Iranian epic Shahnameh, where the legendary Iranian hero Thraetaona has three sons, Iraj (Aryan), Tur (Turanian) and Salm (Sairima). It is therefore plausible that the Turanians, Sairima, Dahi, and possibly the Saini were part of or associated with the broader phenomenon of Scythian cultures.

=== Zamyad Yasht ===
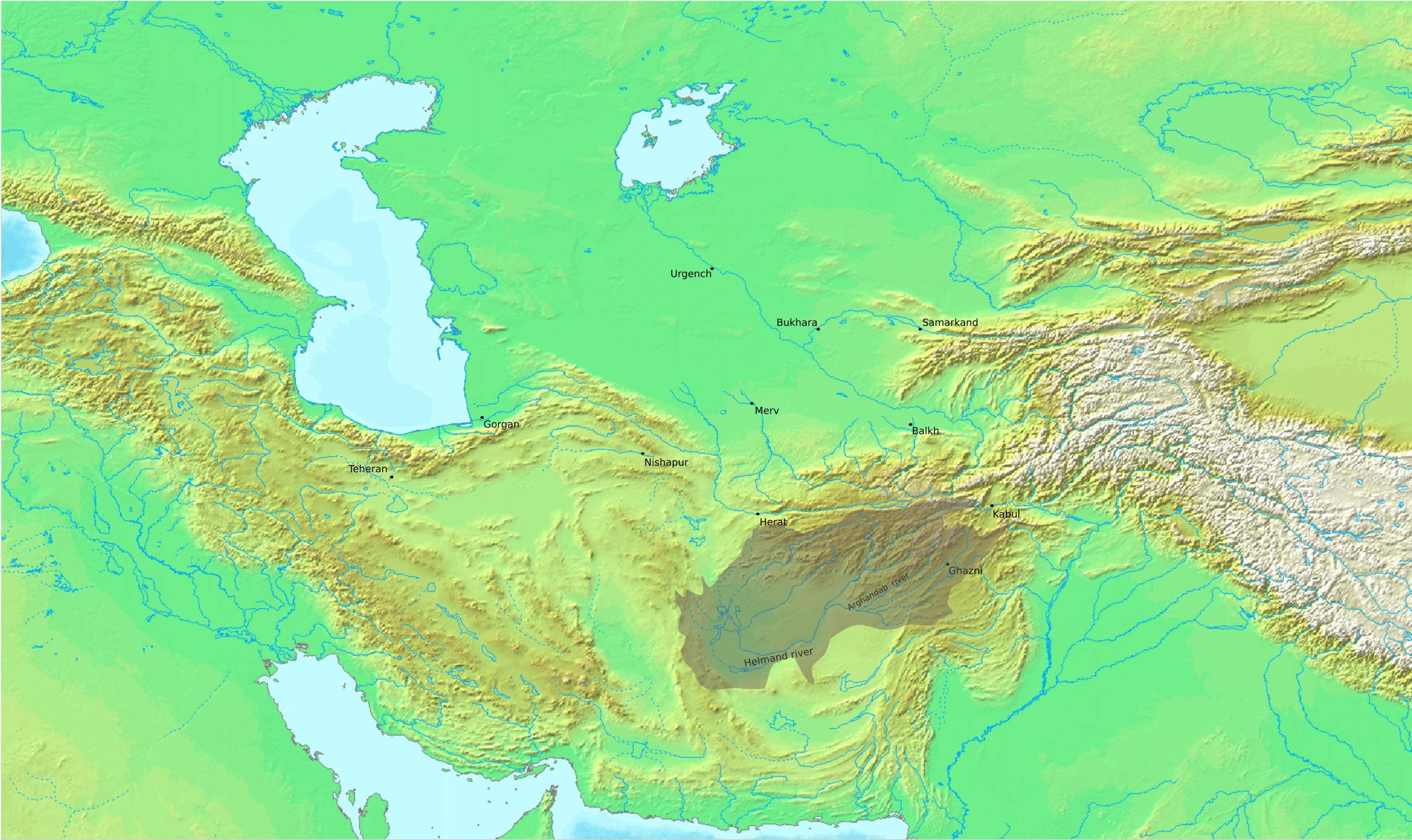
Area of the Sistan Basin

The Zamyad Yasht is named after Zam, the Zoroastrian divinity that personifies the Earth. The extant version of the Zamyad Yasht consists of two parts. The first part is a fragment of eight sections (Yt. 19.1-8) containing a list of 40 mountains. Despite its geographical character, the list is interpreted to represent mythology rather than geography. The second, much longer part is the Kayan Yasn, dedicated to the Khvarenah (Avestan: xᵛarənah, 'glory') of the Kayanian dynasty. This glory is first bestowed by Ahura Mazda upon the Pishdadian dynasty, the mythical predecessors of the Kayanian dynasty. Yet after the downfall of Yima, they lose the glory which then becomes unseized or unappropriated (axᵛarəta). In search of a legitimate holder, the glory finally reaches the Kansayoya sea. At this point, the Yasht provides a detailed description of the hydrography of the Sistan Basin, in particular of Hāmūn-e Helmand:

(the Unappropriated Glory) which is coming over
to Saoshyant Verethrajan
who will rise from the area
where the Kansayoya sea is situated by the (River) Haetumant
and Mount Ushada
around which the many watercourses meet, coming from the mountains.

Towards (Mount Ushada) the (River) Khvastra flows to meet (the others),
towards it the Khvastra hurries to meet (the others),
and (so do) the Huvaspa and the Fradata,
the beautiful Khvarenanguhaiti,
the strong Ushtavaiti,
the Urva rich in pastures,
the Erezi, and the Zurenumaiti;
towards (Mount Ushada) the Haetumant flows to meet (the others),
towards it the Haetumant hurries (to meet the others),
being splendid and glorious,
parading with its white surges and sending down many floods.

— Zamyad Yasht 19.66–77 (translated by Helmut Humbach).

Apart from the Helmand River, these verses contain the names of eight other rivers flowing into lake Hamun; namely the Khvastra (xᵛāstrā, 'good pasture'), the Huvaspa (hvaspā, 'good horse'), the Fradata (fradaθā, 'wealthy'), the Khvarenanguhaiti (xᵛarənahvaitī), the Ushtavaiti (uštavaitī), the Urva (urvaδā, 'liquid'), the Erezi (Ǝrəzī), and the Zurenumaiti (zurənumaitī). None of these names relate directly to known Sistani rivers but a number of studies have tried to establish such connections. These attempts rely on parallels in Pahlavi literature like the Bundahishn and the Tarikh-i Sistan, where a number of Sistani rivers are mentioned. Further features of Sistani geography recur in the same verses, like the Kansayoya sea or Mount Ushada, both of which are closely connected to Zoroastrian eschatology. Together with the description in the Vendidad, these passages make Sistan the best described region in the Avesta.

== Conclusion ==
A comparison of the first chapter of the Vendidad with the passages of geographical interest in the great Yashts shows that the geographical area of interest for the people of the Avesta was centered around the Hindu Kush range. To the north, it included Sogdiana, Bactria, Aria, Margiana and Chorasmia; an area later known as Afghanistan . To the south, it included Arachosia, Drangiana, Gandara and the upper Punjab up to the Indus River; an area known as Ariana, the land of the Arya, to the Greeks. This strong focus on Eastern Iran has also implication for the time of composition of the text. Starting with the rise of the Achaemenid Empire, the political focus of the Iranian world shifted decidedly to the West. The near-total absence of western Iranians place names, with the possible exception of Rey and Hyrcania, makes it unlikely that the composition of these texts happened after the rise of the Acheminids. Modern scholarship therefore finds a date of composition prior to the 6th century most likely.

== See also ==
- Ariana
- Greater Khorasan
- Bharata Khanda, its Hindu counterpart
- Seven Old Iranian climes
