= Hara Berezaiti =

Legendary mountain in the Avesta

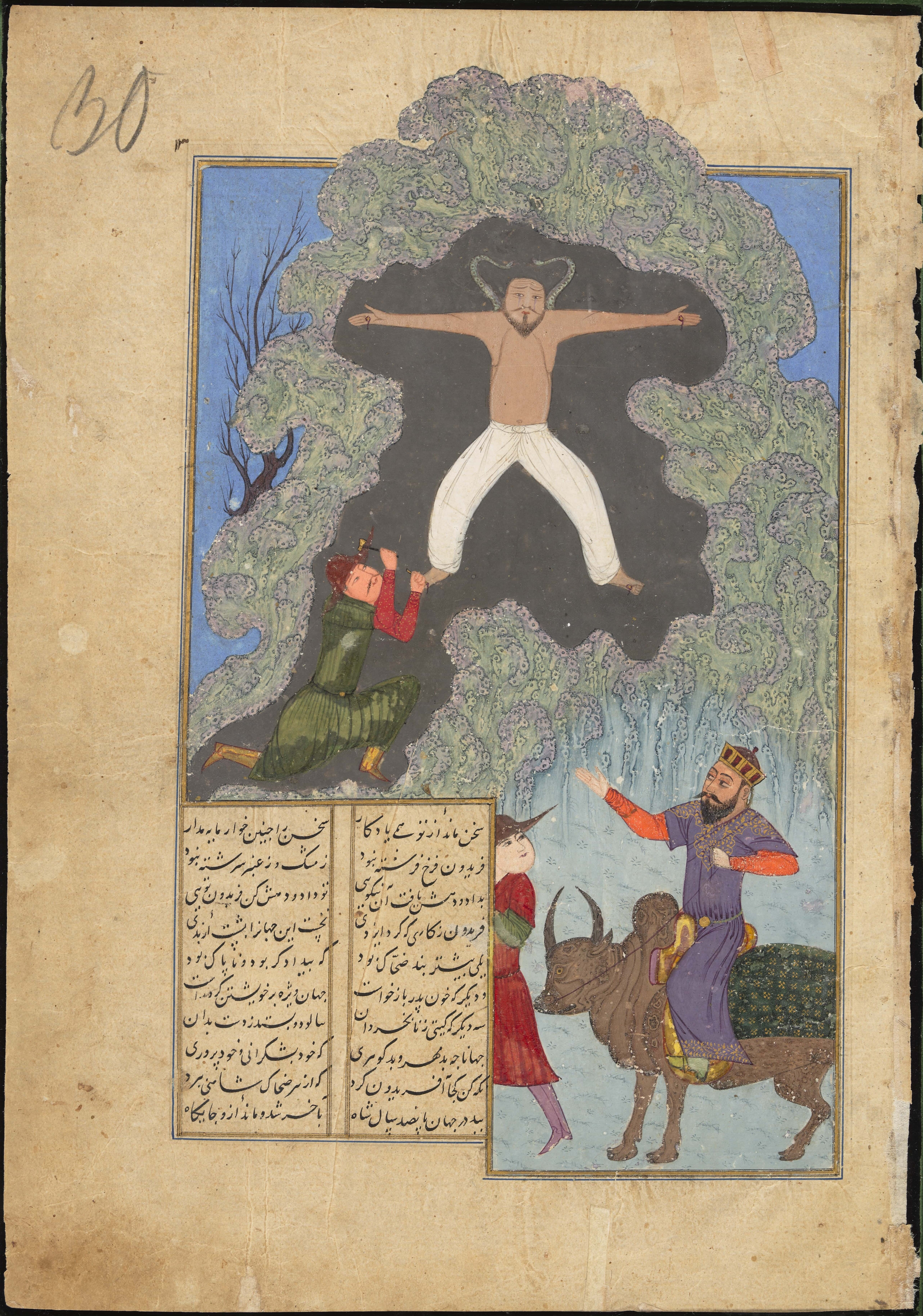
- Zahhak chained on Mt. Hara

In-universe information
- Type: Mythical mountain

Hara Berezaiti (Avestan: 𐬵𐬀𐬭𐬁⸱𐬠𐬆𐬭𐬆𐬰𐬀𐬌𐬙𐬍, lit. 'High Watch') is a mythical mountain or mountain range in Zoroastrian tradition. Over time, it has been associated with a number of real-world mountains, more specifically Alborz mountain range in Iran.

In the Avesta, Mount Hara is the home of Mithra. In later texts like the Bundahishn, it appears as a center of the world around which the stars and planets revolve. It is also the gateway to the afterlife. In Iranian legend, it was on Hara Berezaiti that the hero Fereydun chained Zahhak. Modern version of its name appear in many mountains and mountain ranges over the Iranian world.

== Etymology ==
Hara Berezaiti (Avestan: 𐬵𐬀𐬭𐬁⸱𐬠𐬆𐬭𐬆𐬰𐬀𐬌𐬙𐬍, harā.bərəzaitī) is the term used in the Avesta, whereas Sassanian era texts, like the Bundahishn use Harborz (Middle Persian: hlbwlc). They are generally interpreted to mean High Watch or High Guard.

The first term (Avestan: 𐬀𐬌𐬙𐬍, harā; Middle Persian: hl) is assumed to be derived from Proto-Indo-European (PIE) *ser- with the meaning of to keep watch or to guard (compare e.g. English conserve or observe). The second term (Avestan: 𐬠𐬆𐬭𐬆𐬰𐬀𐬧𐬙, bərəzat; Middle Persian: bwlč) derives from PIE *bʰérǵʰonts and PIE *bʰerǵʰ-, respectively, both with the meaning of tall or lofty (compare e.g. English barrow or borough). It is continued in Persian borz (برز), meaning tall.

Avestan Hara Berezaiti and Middle Persian Harborz are the origin of Persian Alborz (البرز) and derivatives like Elbrus. These appear as toponyms for a number of real-world mountains and mountain ranges in Iran (see below).

== In the Avesta ==
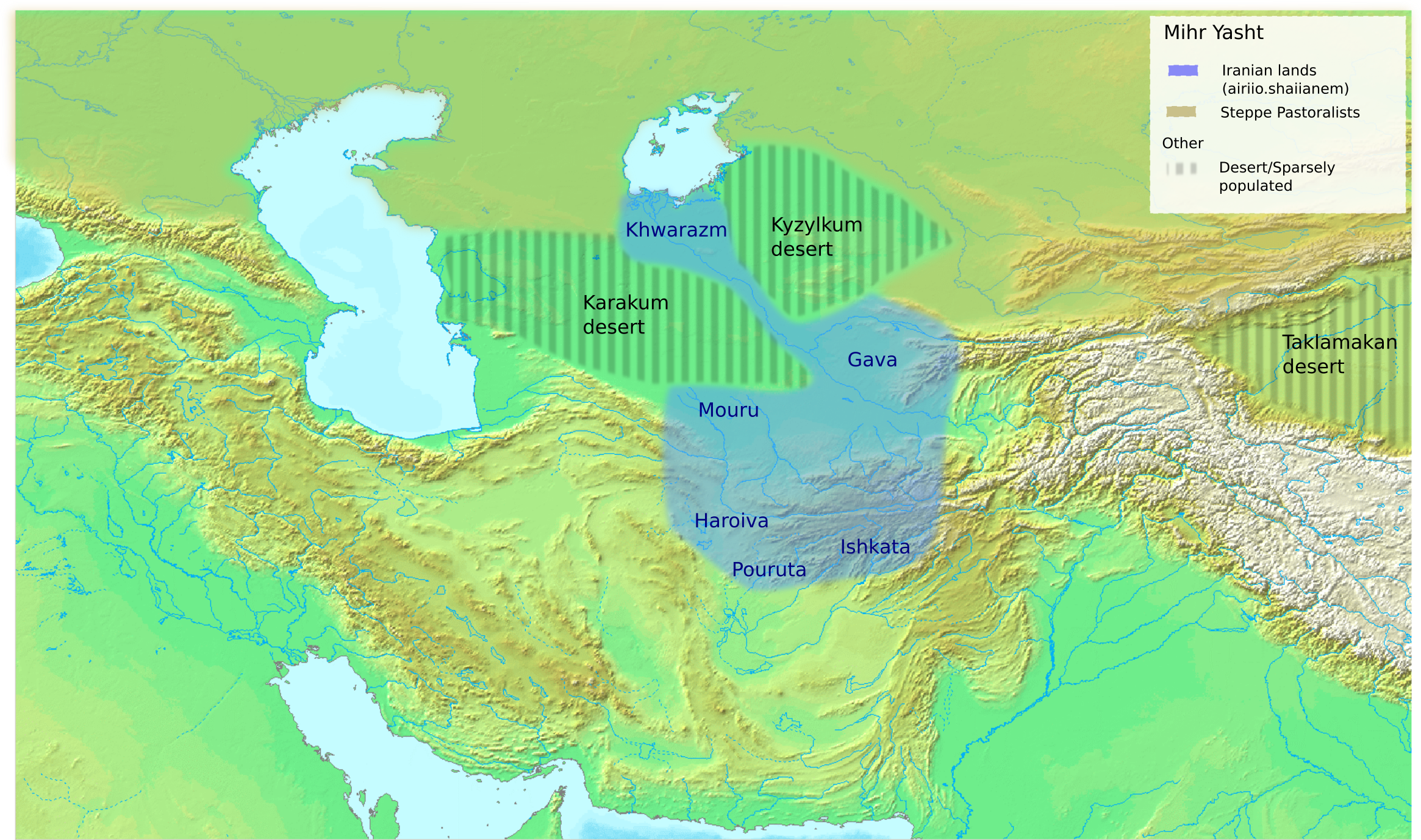
Approximate location of the Iranian lands surveyed by Mithra from Mount Hara in the Mihr Yasht of the Avesta

The Avesta is the collection of canocial scriptures of Zoroastrianism and presents the world view of the Iranians during the Old Iranian period. In these texts, Mount Hara is mentioned several times in the Yasna and a number of Yashts.

In verse Y. 57.19 the personification of Haoma is mentioned offering to the Zoroastrian divinity Sraosha on Mount Hara. The same is said in the Mihr Yasht with respect to Mithra (see below) and figures like Hushang and Yima are likewise said to have offered sacrifice there, to the Anahita, Drvaspa, and Vayu in the Yashts dedicated to these divinities. Verse Y. 42.3 also shows that Hara was sometimes called Hukairya (of good activity).

Mount Hara is most often mentioned in the Mihr Yasht dedicated to Mithra. Verses Yt. 10.12-14 describe how Mithra reaches Mount Hara and survey the lands of the Iranians, where "navigable rivers rush with wide a swell towards Parutian Ishkata, Haraivian Margu, Sogdian Gava, and Chorasmia." Verses Yt. 10.50-51 state how his abode above Mount Hara was built by Ahura Mazda and the Amesha Spentas and verses Yt. 10.88-94 describe how he is worshipped on the highest peak of Hara by Haoma.

== In Zoroastrian tradition ==
Additional material on the Zoroastrian view of Mount Hara is given in the Bundahishn, an encyclopedia on Zoroastrian knowledge, compiled in Sassanian times and written in Middle Persian. According to the Bundahishn, earth was initially created as flat. Out of this flat earth, Mount Hara would grow for 800 years until finally reaching to highest point in heaven.

Hara was thought to be situated at the center of the seven climes that formed the world. It is the source of all waters and from its peak Aredvi Sura Anahita would flow into the world ocean Vourukasha. Night and day were caused by the mountain blocking the sun during the daily cycle. Its peak was supposed to be a place of primordial purity, unaffected by the works of Angra Mainyu like darkness, diseases or pollution. It was also the place from where the dead could pass the bridge of judgement to either the House of Lies or the House of Song. At the entrance of the bridge there is a tribunal, over which Mithra presides in the company of Sraosha and Rashnu (Mēnōg ī xrad 2.118). Due to its centrality in the cosmic world order, Mount Hara has been compared to Mount Meru found in the closely related Old Indic texts.

== In Iranian epic tradition ==
Mount Hara also appears in Ferdowsi's Shahnameh under the name Alborz situated in Ērānvēj. It is the place of refuge for Fereydun when he is sought for by the spies of Zahhāk. It is the dwelling-place of the Simorgh, where she brings up the infant Zāl. It is also the region where Kai Kobad dwells before being summoned to the throne of Iran by Rostam.

== Modern identification ==
Although Mount Hara appears in Zoroastrian texts as a mythological mountain, it has been variously identified with real mountains and mountain ranges throughout Iranian history. One example is the Alborz mountain range, which contains Iran's highest peak, Mount Damavand. Another example is Mount Elbrus the highest mountain of the Caucasus Mountains. Next to these prominent examples, many smaller mountains have been name after Mount Hara. One example is Mount Alborz located in the Jahrom County of Fars province.

Mountains or mountain ranges named after Mount Hara
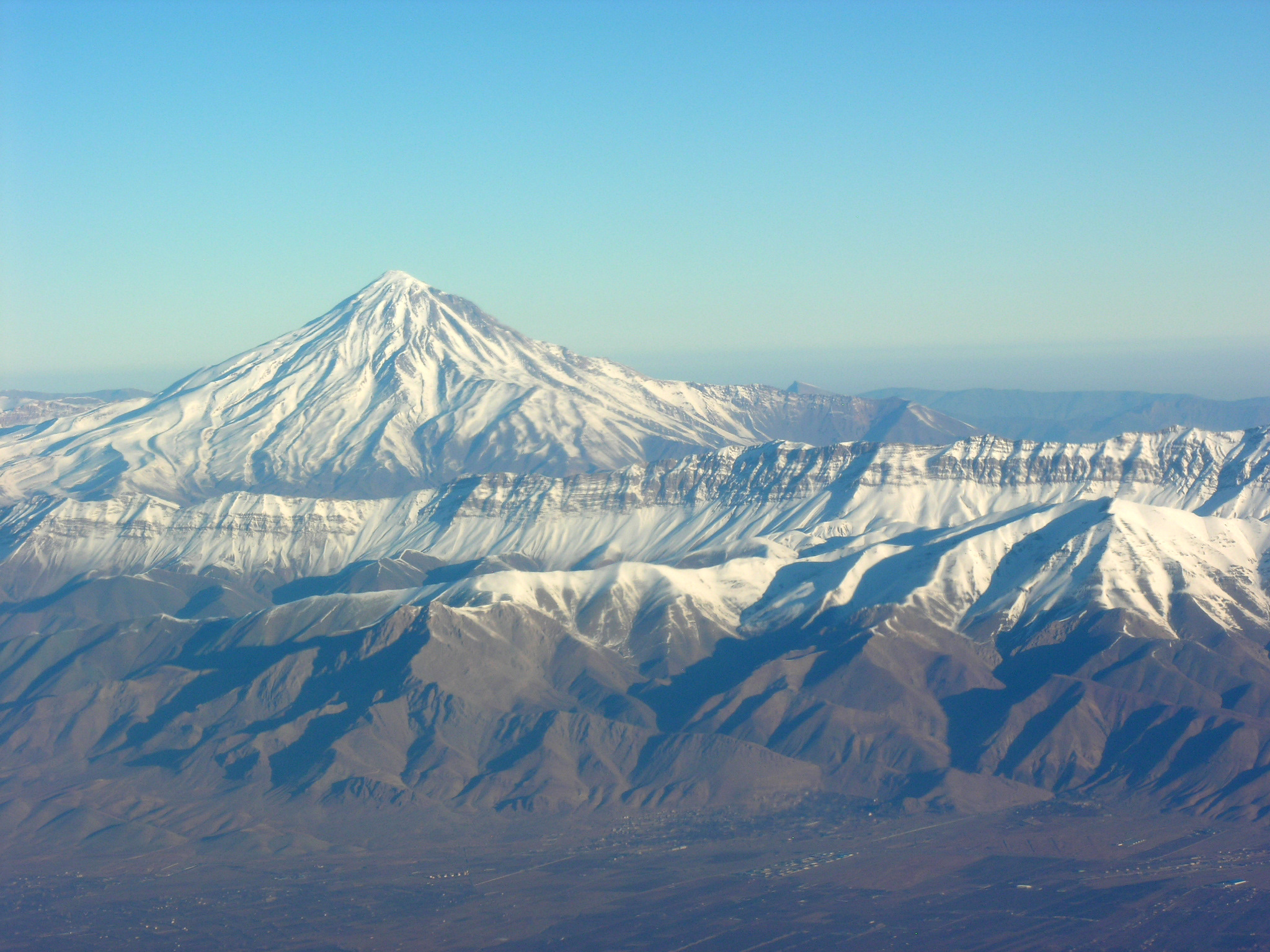
Damavand in the Alborz mountain range

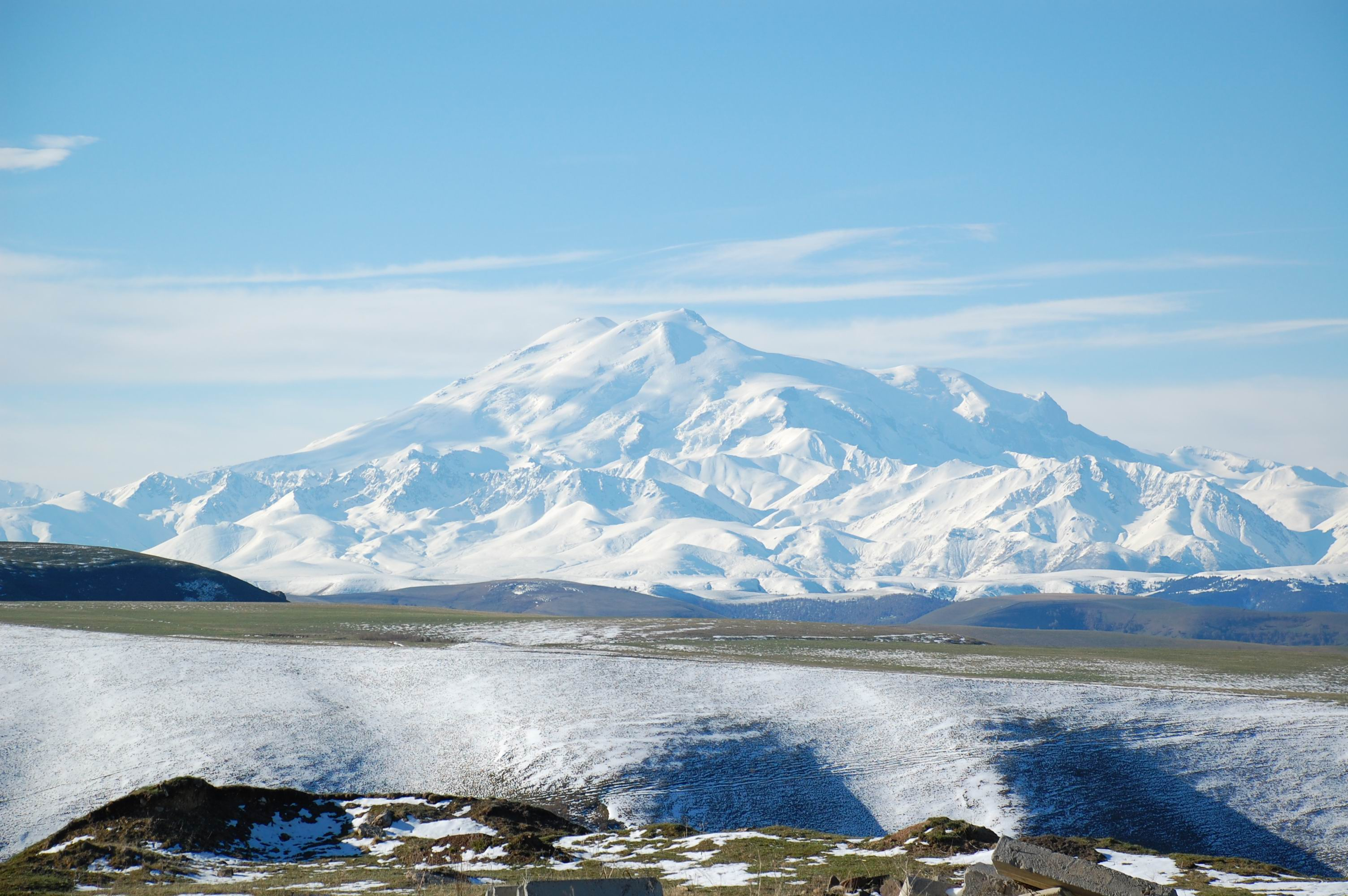
Mount Elbrus in the Caucasus Mountains, seen from the north

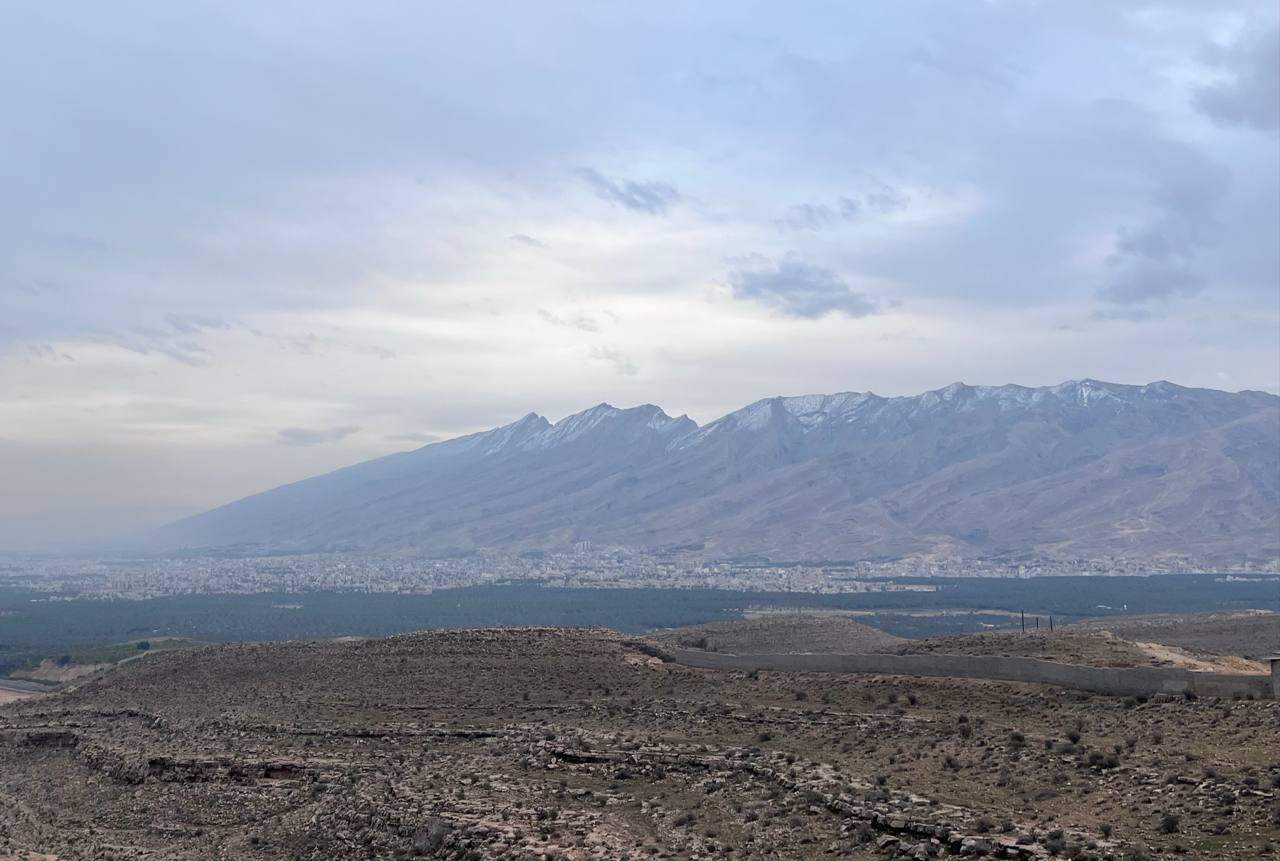
Mount Alborz in Jahrom County, Fars province

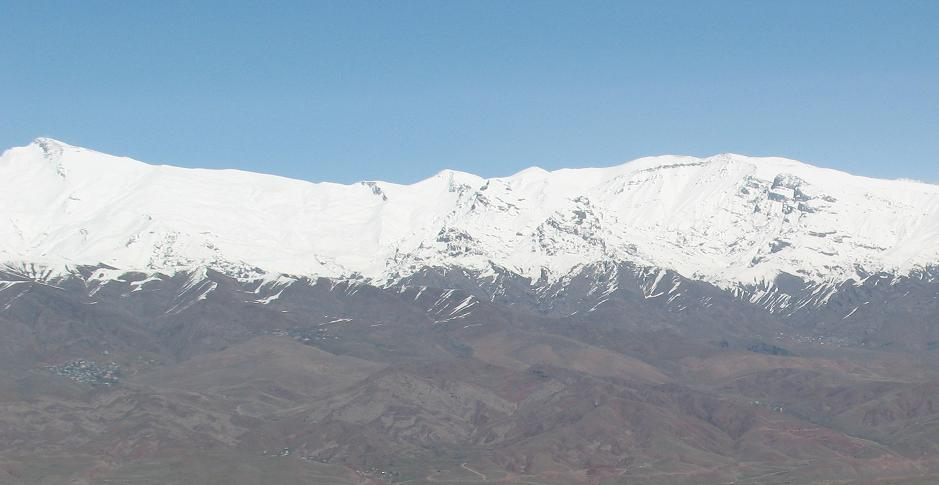
Shah Alborz, a peak in the Alborz mountain range

== See also ==
- Mount Meru
- *Harahvati Aredvi Sura Anahita, the source of all waters in the world that descends from the mythical Mount Hara.
- Airyanem Vaejah, the first of the lands created by Ahura Mazda.
- Avestan geography
- Mount Qaf
