= Arianis =

Species of plant

Arianis (Greek: ἀριανίς) a fiery-colored plant growing wild in Ariana, as appeared in Pliny's (Natural History) 24, 17, 102, § 162.
