= Airyanem Vaejah =

Mythological homeland of the early Iranians

- Region
- Etymology: Arya expanse
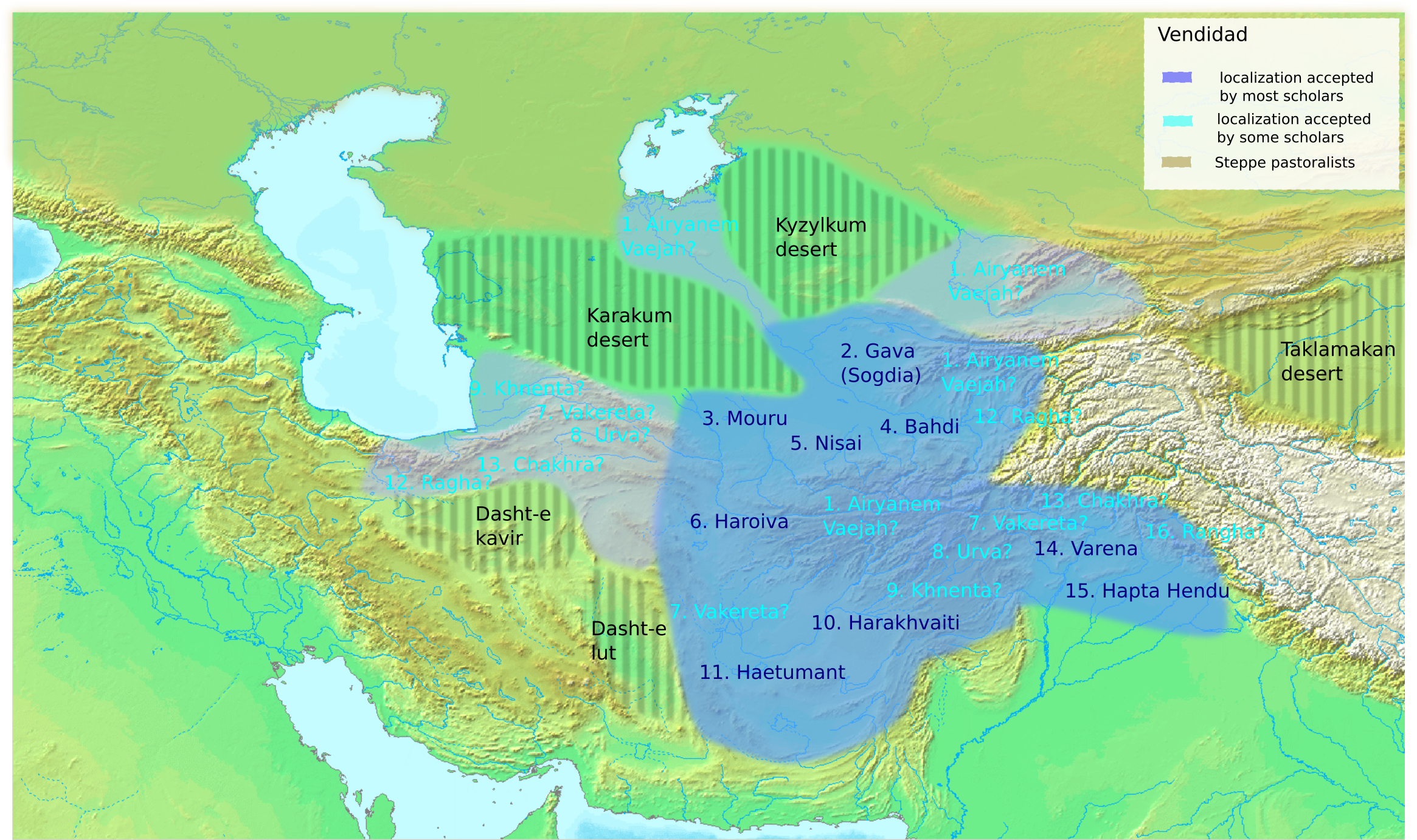
- Approximate location of Airyanem Vaejah according to a number of scholars. (Note: Sources for the different localizations are provided in the description of the image.)
- Demonym: Iranians

Airyanem Vaejah (Avestan: 𐬀𐬌𐬭𐬌𐬌𐬀𐬥𐬆𐬨 𐬬𐬀𐬉𐬘𐬀𐬵, romanized: Airiianəm Vaējah; Late Middle Persian: Ērān-wēj; New Persian: ایران‌ویج, romanized: Ērān-wēj; Parthian: Aryānwēžan, 'the Arya Expanse (Note: The translation of Vaejah as 'expanse' is tentative. For other possibilities, see below.)') is considered in Zoroastrianism to be the homeland of the early Iranians and the place where Zarathustra received the religion from Ahura Mazda. The Avesta also names it as the first of the "sixteen perfect lands" that Ahura Mazda created for the Iranians.

Based on these descriptions, modern scholarship initially focused on Airyanem Vaejah in an attempt to determine the homeland of the Iranians or Indo-Iranians in general. Among these early attempts, the region of Khwarezm emerged as a likely locale. More recent scholarship, however, no longer agrees as to where Airyanem Vaejah might have been located or to what extent it is a mythological rather than a specific historical place.

== Etymology and related words ==
The Avestan Airyanəm Vaējah and the Middle Persian Ērān-wēz are compound terms, where the first part is the adjective or genitive plural of Arya (Avestan: 𐬀𐬌𐬭𐬌𐬌𐬀, airiia; Middle Persian: 𐭠𐭩𐭫, er), respectively. This term also appears in Vedic Sanskrit as the self designation of the people of the Vedas. Within the context of Iran, however, this term simply means Iranian. However, the exact meaning of the second part vaējah or wēz is uncertain. Friedrich Carl Andreas derives it from a hypothetical Old Iranian *vyacah which he connects to Vedic Sanskrit vyacas "territory, region". On the other hand, Émile Benveniste connects it to the Avestan term vaig (brandish, throw (a weapon)) which would be cognate to Vedic Sanskrit vega (vehement movement, irruption, flow) and, therefore, would give vaējah the meaning of "extent" or "expanse". It may also be related to Vedic Sanskrit vej/vij (to move with a quick darting motion, speed, heave (said of waves)), suggesting the region of a fast-flowing river.

Zoroastrian tradition knows at least two other terms that associate the Iranian people with a geographical region. The first is found in the Avesta specifically in the Mihr Yasht. Therein, verse Yt. 10.13 describes how Mithra reaches Mount Hara and overlooks the Airyoshayana (Avestan: airyō.šayana, 'Iranian lands'). This term is usually interpreted to refer to the entire land inhabited by Iranians which would make it an umbrella term for the Iranian regions mentioned in the following verse Yt. 10.14. However, Gherardo Gnoli notes the ambiguity of the text, such that Airyoshayana, like Airyanem Vaejah, may only refer to a specific country, one that occupies a prominent place among the Iranian countries from verses Yt. 10.13–14. The second term is the Middle Persian Ērān-shahr (𐭠𐭩𐭥𐭠𐭭𐭱𐭲𐭥𐭩) and Ērān (𐭠𐭩𐭥𐭠𐭭). This word is the origin of the modern Persian term Iran. However, a possible Old Iranian origin *aryānām xšaθra- has not been established and the term may be an innovation of the Sassanians.

== In the Avesta ==
The earliest mentions of Airyanem Vaejah are found in the Avesta, in particular in the Vendidad and several of the Yashts. In the Yashts, Airyanem Vaejah is most prominently named in the Aban Yasht as the place where both Ahura Mazda and Zarathustra sacrifice to Anahita:

Unto her did the Maker Ahura Mazda offer up a sacrifice in the Airyanem Vaejah, by the good river Daitya; with the Haoma and meat, with the Baresman, with the wisdom of the tongue, with the holy spells, with the speech, with the deeds, with the libations, and with the rightly-spoken words. (Note: Darmesteter interprets this unique passage, in which Ahura Mazda himself sacrifices to a lesser deity, as the "heavenly prototype of the Mazdean sacrifice as later shown to mankind by Zarathustra".)

...

Unto her did the holy Zarathushtra offer up a sacrifice in the Airyanem Vaejah, by the good river Daitya; with the Haoma and meat, with the Baresman, with the wisdom of the tongue, with the holy spells, with the speech, with the deeds, with the libations, and with the rightly-spoken words.

— Aban Yasht 5.17, 5.104 (translated by James Darmesteter).

The other verses in which Airyanem Vaejah occurs in the Yashts follow the same structure, differing only in the deity to whom the sacrifice is offered. While in Yt. 5.104, Zarathustra is sacrificing to Anahita, this is changed to Drvaspa in the Drvasp Yasht (Yt. 9.25), and to Ashi in the Ard Yasht (Yt. 17.45). In the Vendidad, however, Airyanem Vaejah appears as the first of the sixteen best lands and countries that Ahura Mazda had created for the Zoroastrian community:

I have made every land dear (to its people), even though it had no charms whatever in it:
had I not made every land dear (to its people), even though it had no charms whatever in it, then the whole living world would have invaded the Airyanem Vaejah.

The first of the good lands and countries which I, Ahura Mazda, created, was the Airyanem Vaejah, by the good river Daitya.
Thereupon came Angra Mainyu, who is all death, and he counter-created the serpent in the river and winter, a work of the deavas.

There are ten winter months there, two summer months; and those are cold for the waters, cold for the earth, cold for the trees.
Winter falls there, with the worst of all plagues.

— Vendidad 1.1 – 1.3 (translated by James Darmesteter).

This connection between Airyanem Vaejah and winter is further described in Vd. 2.20–23. In these verses, Ahura Mazda is meeting there with Yima and instructs him to build a shelter for the winter that Angra Mainyu would soon unleash upon the material world. The harsh description of Airyanem Vaejah in Vd. 1.3, however, seems to conflict with the positive assessment given in Vd. 1.1. This has led some to speculate that the third verse is a later insertion, while others think that it could be a fragment of an originally longer description, and the text in Vd. 1.3 refers only to the upper headwaters of the river Daitya.

== In Zoroastrian tradition ==
In middle Iranian sources, Airyanem Vaejah appears as Eranwez. The Bundahishn describes how Eranwez was the place where the first cattle was created (Bd. 13.4) and where Zarathustra first received the religion from Ahura Mazda (Bd. 35.54). The Bundahishn furthermore states that Eranwez is located near Adarbaygan (Bd. 29.12) and that it is connected by the river Daitya to a country called Gobadestan (Bd. 11A.7). The identity of Gobadestan is not known, but its name has been interpreted as a distortion of Sugdestan. Likewise, the river Daitya is often identified in the literature with the Oxus. This apparent conflict between a western and an eastern localization in Greater Iran has been explained as a westward shift in geographic place names that may have taken place parallel to the rise of political power in the western regions, in particular Media and Persis.

== Modern scholarship ==
When investigating the historical reality behind Airyanem Vaejah, modern scholarship is faced with the fact that many references appear in a clearly mythical context, while others may point to a specific historical location. Airyanem Vaejah has, therefore, been compared to Mount Hara, a mountain that both appears in Zoroastrian mythology and has been variously identified with real geographical locations. Modern scholarship is thus trying to distinguish between these mythical and historical elements in the Zoroastrian sources and to find out how the early Iranians conceived of their world in each respective context.

Since the Bundahishn (29.12) specifically places Airyanem Vaejah near Adarbaygan, it is clear that during Sassanian times Iranians believed it to be located in Western Iran. Some early modern scholars tended to accept this localisation, assuming that it also reflected the understanding of Iranians at the much earlier time of the Avesta, i.e., the time when the earliest sources were produced. However, this notion has been criticised due to the observation that all place names in the Avesta that can be reliably identified with modern places are found in the eastern and northeastern part of Greater Iran. As a result, more recent scholarship mostly favours an eastern localisation of Airyanem Vaejah.

One hypothesis that has attracted considerable interest identifies Airyanem Vaejah with Khwarezm. It was proposed early on by Wilhelm Geiger and Josef Markwart and a number of arguments have been voiced in its favor over the years. First, Airyanem Vaejah is described as having long and cold winters and Khwarezm is among the coldest regions of Greater Iran. Next, Airyanem Vaejah is described as the original homeland of the Iranians and Khwarezm has been proposed as an early center of Iranian civilization. This point has been widely discussed within the search for "the traditional homeland" or "the ancient homeland" of the Iranians, perpetuating interpretations of the Airyanem Vaejah as Urheimat des Awestavolkes, Urland of the Indo-Iranians or the Wiege aller iranischen Arier. Another argument builds on a comparison between the list of Iranian countries in the Vendidad (Vd. 1.1.–1.19) and the Mihr Yasht (Yt. 10.13–14). As Christensen has argued, the place occupied by Khwarezm in the Mihr Yasht seems to be occupied by Airyanem Vaejah in the Vendidad. Taken together, these reasons have made the Khwarezm hypothesis very popular and scholars like Mary Boyce, Nasser Takmil Homayoun, and Elton L. Daniel have endorsed it more recently.

However, this hypothesis has also seen a number of criticisms and counter proposals. For instance, Vogelsang has noted that the notion of Khwarezm as an important center of early Iranian civilization is not substantiated by recent evidence and places Airyanem Vaejah in the general region of Transoxiana. Frantz Grenet has interpreted the cold of Airyanem Vaejah as referring to a mountainious rather than a northern region and places it in the upper course of the Oxus river at the pre-Pamirian highlands. According to Michael Witzel, however, Airyanem Vaejah lies at the center of the 16 lands mentioned in the Vendidad – an area now in the central Afghan highlands (around Bamyan Province). He also concludes that the idea of finding the "Aryan homeland" in the Avesta should be abandoned and one should rather focus on how both the earlier (Yasht 32.2) and later Avestan texts themselves regarded their own territory. Finally, some scholars like Skjaervo have concluded that the localization of Airyanem Vaejah is insolveable.

== See also ==
- Avestan geography
- Sintashta
- Ahura Mazda
- Ariana
- Āryāvarta, its Vedic counterpart
- Indo-Iranians
- Haryana
