= Ariana =

Historical region in Asia

Ariana Ἀρ(ε)ιανή (Greek)
- Region
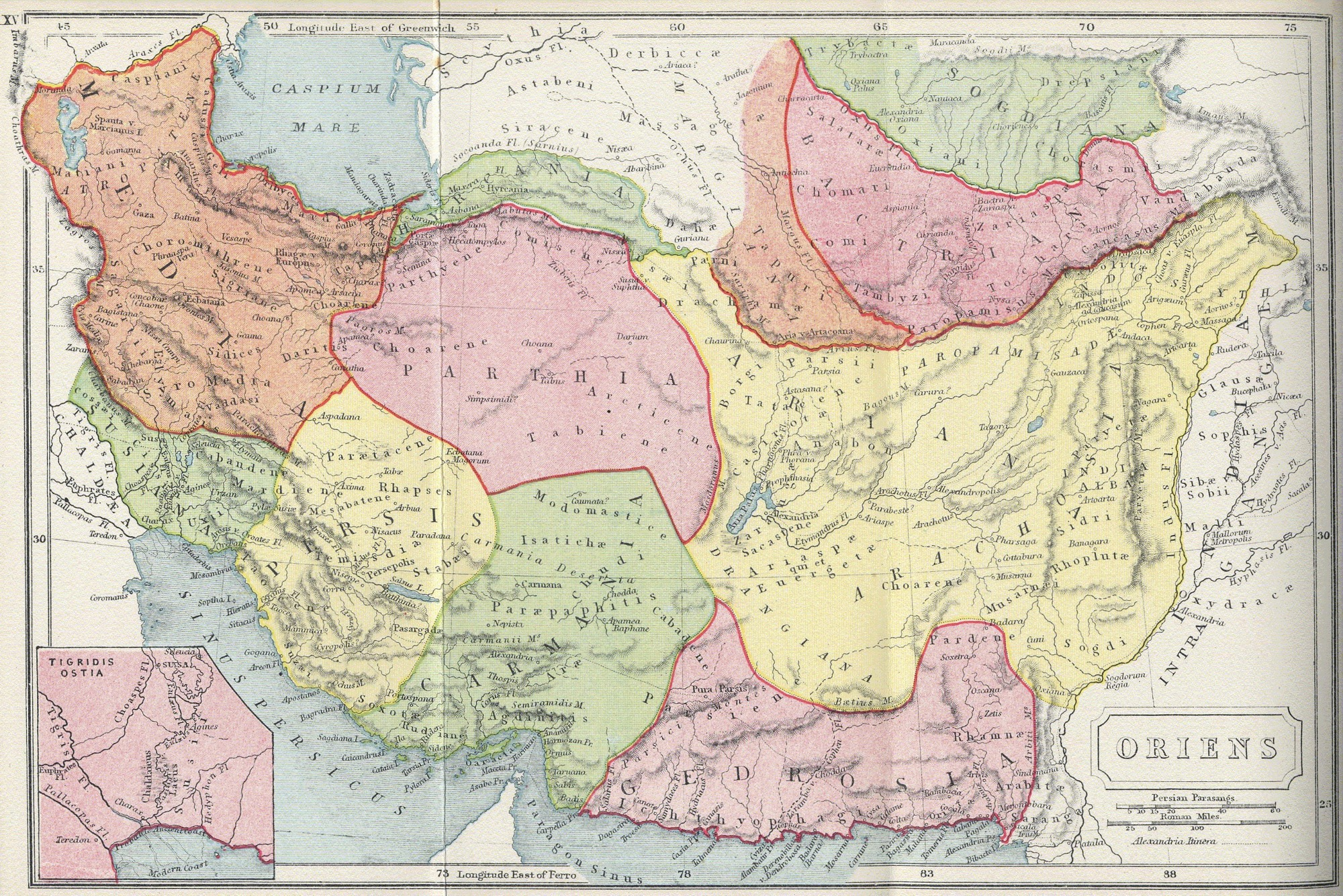
- Map of Ariana (yellow) among the historic Iranian regions, based on descriptions by Eratosthenes of Cyrene. Published in the Atlas of Ancient and Classical Geography by Samuel Butler and Ernest Rhys, 1908.
- Countries: Afghanistan; Iran; Pakistan
- Languages: Various Indo-European languages
- Named for: Arya (Indo-Iranians)

In the Greco-Roman geography, Ariana was a general geographical term referring to the region between Central Asia and the Indus River. Situated to the far east in the Achaemenid Empire, it covered a number of satrapies spanning what is today almost the entirety of Afghanistan, the easternmost parts of Iran, and the westernmost parts of Pakistan. "Ariana" is Latinized from Greek: Ἀρ(ε)ιανή Ar(e)ianē [region]; Ἀρ(ε)ιανοί Ar(e)ianoi [demonym]. The Greek word, in turn, is derived from the term Airyanem (lit. 'Land of the Aryans') in Avestan.

Throughout its history, Ariana was governed by the Persians, such as the Achaemenids, the Kushano-Sasanians, and the Sasanians. Other significant rulers were the Greeks and the Indians, such as the Macedonians, the Seleucids, the Mauryas, the Greco-Bactrians, the Indo-Greeks, the Indo-Scythians, and the Parthians (including the Indo-Parthians) and the Kushans. Various Huna peoples and other Central Asian nomads also had a historical presence in parts of Ariana, such as the Xionites (including the Kidarites and the Hephthalites).

== Etymology ==
The Greek term Arianē (Latin: Ariana), a term found in Avestan Airiiana- (especially in Airyanem Vaejah). The ancient name Ariana was derived from Airyanem Vaejah and the form Ariana is found in Old Persian, a view supported by the traditions of the country preserved by Muslim writers in the 9th and the 10th centuries. The Greeks also referred to Haroyum/Haraiva (Herat) as Aria, which was one of the many provinces found in Ariana.

The names Ariana and Aria and other ancient variants, of which Aria is a component element, are connected with the Avestan term Airya-, and the Old Persian term Ariya-, a self-designation of the peoples of ancient Iran and ancient India, meaning 'noble', 'excellent' and 'honourable'.

== Geography ==
The limits of Ariana are laid down with little accuracy in classical sources. It seems to have been often confused (as in Pliny, Naturalis Historia, book vi, chapter 23) with the small province of Aria.

As a geographical term, Ariana was introduced by the Greek geographer, Eratosthenes (c. 276 BC – c. 195 BC) and was fully described by another Greek geographer Strabo (64/63 BC – ca. AD 24).

Per Eratosthenes' definition, the borders of Ariana were defined by the Indus River in the east, the sea in the south, a line from Carmania to the Caspian Gates (apparently referring to the pass near the southeastern edge of the Caspian Sea) in the west, and the so-called Taurus Mountains in the north. This large region included almost all of the countries east of Media and ancient Persia, including south of the great mountain ranges up to the deserts of Gedrosia and Carmania, i.e. the provinces of Carmania, Gedrosia, Drangiana, Arachosia, Aria, the Paropamisadae; Bactria was also reckoned to be in Ariana and was called "the ornament of Ariana as a whole" by Apollodorus of Artemita.

Strabo mentions that the Indus River flows between Ariana and India. He states that Ariana is bounded on the east by the Indus River, on the south by the great sea and that its parts on the west are marked by the same boundaries by which Parthia is separated from Media and Carmania from Paraetacenê and Persis. After having described the boundaries of Ariana, Strabo writes that the name Αρειανή could also be extended to part of the Persians and the Medes and also to the northwards Bactrians and the Sogdians. A detailed description of that region is to be found in Strabo's Geographica, Book XV – "Persia, Ariana, the Indian subcontinent", chapter 2, sections 1–9. Dionysius Periegetes (1097) agrees with Strabo in extending the northern boundary of the Ariani to the Paropamisus, and (714) speaks of them as inhabiting the shores of the Erythraean Sea. It is probable, from Strabo (xv. p.724), that the term was extended to include the east Persians, Bactrians, and Sogdians, with the people of Ariana below the mountains, because they were for the most part of one speech.

By Herodotus Ariana is not mentioned, nor is it included in the geographical description of Stephanus of Byzantium and Ptolemy, or in the narrative of Arrian.

== Inhabitants ==
The peoples by whom Ariana was inhabited, as enumerated by Strabo were:

- Arachoti;
- Arii;
- Bactrians;
- Gedrosii;
- Drangae;
- Paropamisadae;
- Parthians;
- Persians;
- Sogdians.

Pliny (vi. 25) specifies the following ethnicities:

- Angutturi;
- Arii;
- the inhabitants of Daritis;
- Dorisci;
- Drangae;
- Evergetae;
- Gedrussi;
- Ichthyophagi;
- Methorici;
- Pasires;
- Urbi;
- Zarangae.

Rüdiger Schmitt, the German scholar of Iranian studies, also believes that Ariana should have included other Iranian peoples. He writes in the Encyclopædia Iranica:

Eratosthenes’ use of this term (followed by Diodorus 2.37.6) is obviously due to a mistake, since, firstly, not all inhabitants of these lands belonged to the same tribe and, secondly, the term "Aryan" originally was an ethnical one and only later a political one as the name of the Iranian empire (for all North Indians and Iranians designated themselves as "Aryan"; See Aryan), thus comprising still other Iranian tribes outside of Ariana proper, like Medes, Persians or Sogdians (so possibly in Diodorus 1.94.2, where Zarathushtra is said to have preached Ahura Mazdā's laws "among the Arianoi").

— R. Schmitt, 1986

== See also ==
- Arianis
- Āryāvarta
- Avestan geography
- Khorasan
- History of Afghanistan
