= Rasā =

Rasa (rásā रसा) is the name of a western tributary of the Indus in the Rigveda (verse 5.53.9). The word rasa means "moisture, humidity" in Vedic Sanskrit.

In RV 9.41.6, RV 10.108 and in the Nirukta of Yaska, it is the name of a mythical stream supposed to flow around the Earth and the atmosphere (compare Oceanus), also referring to the underworld in the Mahabharata and the Puranas (compare Styx).

The corresponding term in Avestan is Ranha/Raŋhā. In the Vendidad, Ranha is mentioned just after Hapta-Həṇdu, and may possibly refer to the ocean.

Witzel makes the case that the verse is a remembrance of distant emigration and denotes the river Volga in the steppe homeland of the aryans :- "IIr. river *Raså corresponds in name to the Vedic Raså (RV, JB), the E.Ir. (Avest.) Raŋhå, and the N.Ir. *Rahå that ispreserved in Greek as Rhå and designates the R. Volga".

== See also ==
- Rasa, dew in Lithuanian
