= Karshvar =

Seven zones of Earth in the Avesta

In the Avesta, reference is made to seven karshvar (Avestan: 𐬐𐬀𐬭𐬀𐬱𐬀𐬎𐬎𐬀𐬭𐬀, romanized: karšvar, lit. 'delineated land' > Persian: kišvar), climes or zones, organizing the world map into a seven-storied ziggurat representing the cosmic mountain. The world is referred to as the haft keshvar "seven climes". The word has also been translated as "region", "state" or "continent".

The Avesta describes the karshvar as superimposed concentric circles one above the other, with increasing size. These are separated by waters, mountains or forests.

1. Arəzahī ("East") (Persian: ارزَه, Arzah)
2. Savahī ("West") (Persian: سَوَه, Savah)
3. Fradaδafšu ("Southeast") (Persian: فِرَدَدَفش, Firadadafš)
4. Vīdaδafšu ("Southwest") (Persian: ویدَدَفش, Vīdadafš)
5. Vouru.barəštī ("Northwest") (Persian: وُروبَرِشن, Vurūbarišn)
6. Vouru.ǰarəštī ("Northeast") (Persian: وُروجَرِشن, Vurūjarišn)
7. Xvaniraθa ("Center") (Persian: خوَنیرَث, Xūnīras)

The story of the creation of these seven regions is told in Bundahishn when "rain first fell upon the earth". Man lives in the karshvar Hvaniratha. Hvaniratha is believed to be "central one" and whose size was as large as all others together. The karshvar Hvaniratha is where "peak of Hara" (Alburz) had "grown from the roots of Elburz mountains".

Sufi traditions postulate an eighth clime, the "heavenly Earth" or "cosmic North".

In Theosophy, according to H. P. Blavatsky (The Devil's Own, 1891), Ahura is interpreted as a generic name for the sevenfold Deity, the Ruler of the Seven Worlds, and Hvaniratha is the middle plane (the fourth of seven), corresponding to Earth.

== See also ==
- Seven Seas
- Seven climes
- Avestan geography
- Jambudvīpa, the equivalent continents in Indic mythology
