= Gherardo Gnoli =

Historian of Italian religions and Iran expert

Gherardo Gnoli (6 December 1937 in Rome – 7 March 2012 in Cagli) was an Italian historian of religions and scholar of Iranian studies.

== Biography ==
Gherardo Gnoli has been since 1996 the president of the Italian Institute for Africa and the East (IsIAO). He was also the head of the Public Counsel Institute and later the Italian Institute for the Middle and the Far East (ISMEO), which had been founded in 1933 by Giovanni Gentile and Giuseppe Tucci. He headed the Italy-Africa Institute (IIA), which had been founded in 1906 under the name of "Italian Colonial Institute" by Italian explorers, academics and diplomats.

He was a professor of Iranian philosophy at the University of Naples "L'Orientale" (from 1965 to 1993), where he became the chancellor from 1971 to 1978 and the head of religious history of Iran and Central Asia at La Sapienza University of Rome (from 1993 to 2008). In addition he was the president of the same academy from 1979 to 1995. From 1995 until his death, Gherardo Gnoli was also the president of the Italian Society for the History of Religions.

His brother, Raniero Gnoli was a Sanskritist and an expert of Roman marbels. Gherardo Gnoli was an international enthusiast to understand Iran. He was also a partner of Lincei Academy in France, Russia and Hungary and an honorary member of Paris's Asian Society, Ancient India and Iran Trust of Cambridge and Institute de France.

His name is recorded as number 318 on the list of members of the Masonic lodge P2. He always acted as though he was ignorant about the issues. He was among those without an identification card, an address or any other element which would identify him. As is clear from his parliamentary actions, beginning in September 1981, his positions, even relating to administrative issues, were ultimately archived.

== Selected works ==
- The Idea of Iran: An Essay on Its Origin, Istituto italiano per il Medio ed Estremo Oriente, 1989.
- The Judeo-Persian inscriptions of the Ġūr (Afghanistan), Eastern Series Rome (SOR) 30, Rome, Italian Institute for the Middle and the Far East (IsMEO), 1964.
- Historical Research on Ancient Sīstān, Reports and Memoirs n. 10, Rome, IsMEO, 1967.
- Zoroaster's time and homeland. A study on the origins of Mazdeism and related problems, Series minor 7, Naples, Istituto Universitario Orientale, 1980.
- Iran als religiöser Begriff im Mazdaismus, Rheinisch-Westfälische Akademie der Wissenschaften, Vorträge G 320, Opladen, Westdeutscher Verlag, 1993.
- Inventory of the South Arabian inscriptions, t. 2, Shaqab al-Manaṣṣa, Paris, Académie des Inscriptions et Belles-Lettres; Rome, IsMEO, 1993.
- Zoroaster in History, Biennial Yarshater Lecture Series no. 2, University of California, Los Angeles (April 21–25, 1997), New York, Bibliotheca Persica Press, 2000.

== Editor and scientific director ==
- Death, the dead in ancient societies, Parigi, Editions of the House of Sciences of Man, 1982, 505 pp. (J. -P. Vermont).
- Mircea Eliade and the Asian religion: atti del convegno sul tema (Rome, 22–23 April 1988), Sor 64, Rome, Ismeo, 1989, 172 pp.
- Manicheismo, 3 voll., Fondazione Lorenzo Valla, Milan, Mondadori, 2003–2008.

- flight. 1: Man and Manicheism, 2003.

- flight. 2: : It myth the doctrine. I tested Coptic Manichaeans and anti-Christian controversy, 2006

- flight. He puts the doctrine. Testi manichei dell'Asia Centrale and della Cina, 2008.
