= Bushyasta =

Zoroastrian demon (daeva)

Bushyasta (Avesta, būšyāsta, būšiiąstā) is the Zoroastrian demon (daeva) of sloth. Her stock epithet is "the long-handed".

In scripture as well as in later tradition, Bushyasta (Middle Persian: Bushasp) is the hypostasis of laziness and idleness. She is the cause of procrastination as she strives to keep the righteous (ashavan) from performing productive tasks. She lulls the world back to sleep and "makes the faithful forget in slumber the hour of prayer."

Although there are "as many demons as the sins that man commits" and Bushyasta is among the few daevas who are specifically mentioned in the texts, she is not among the fiends who are described in any great detail.

== In scripture ==
Besides Bushyasta's stock epithet as "the long-handed," (e.g. Vendidad 11.9, 11.12, 18.16; Yasht 10.97), she is also described to be "gaunt" (Vendidad 11.9 and 11.12), and in Yasht 18.2, she is said to be zairi, "yellow, golden, green."

In verse 1 and 2 of Yasht 18, which is nominally dedicated to Arshtat "Justice", khwarenah is said to vanquish Angra Mainyu, Aeshma of "Wrath", the Freezing Cold, Apaosha of "Drought", and Bushyasta.

Towards dawn, before the demons are forced back into the darkness, Bushyasta rushes from the north murmuring "Sleep on, O men! Sleep on, O sinners! Sleep on and live in sin" (Hadhokht Nask 41–42). Bushyasta is named among the demons who flee at the sight of Mithra's mace. (Yasht 10.97, 10.134)

== In tradition ==
In the Bundahishn, a Zoroastrian account of creation completed in the 12th century, Bushasp is one of the hamkars (co-operators) of the six Archdemon. (here GBd XXVII.32) This hierarchy mirrors that of the six Amesha Spentas and their helpers, the yazatas. In a fragment of the "lesser" Bundahishn, Bushasp brings an "unnatural lethargy" upon a hero, who then at that moment fails to defend the world against the fiendish deeds of Aži Dahaka. But the hero is protected by the "divine glory of the heavens", so he eventually wakes rested and kills Dahaka. (IBd 29.7)

In the numerology of the Shayest na Shayest, Bushasp "will twice come to the material world" (13.43), perhaps reflecting the hour of waking and the onset of sleep, or perhaps - as in Dadestan-i Denig 23.3 - being an allusion to birth and death.

In the Dadestan-i Denig 37.44, Bushasp is one of the few explicitly named entities amongst the "hordes" of demons created by Ahriman (Angra Mainyu). In strophe 51 of the same chapter, Ahriman charges the demon with "the weakening of the breath."

== Bibliography ==
- Darmesteter, James, ed. (1880), Vendidad, Sacred Books of the East, Vol. 4, London: Oxford University Press
- Dhalla, Maneckji N. (1938), History of Zoroastrianism, New York: Oxford University Press
- Skjærvø, Prods Oktor (1987), "Aštād Yašt", Encyclopaedia Iranica, vol. 2, New York: Routledge & Kegan Paul: 826
