= Indar =

Zoroastrian deava

Indar or Indra is the Zoroastrian daeva representing the destructive aspects of fire, and leading people away from proper worship. He is the antagonist of Asha Vahishta, the Zoroastrian yazata representing Asha.

== Name ==
Indar (yndl) is the Middle Persian version of Avestan 𐬌𐬧𐬛𐬭𐬀 (indra). The oldest epigraphically attested mention of the name appears ca. 1380 BCE in the treaties between the Mitanni and the Hittites. The name is also widely attested as the Vedic deva इन्द्र (indra). Both Old Iranian and Old Indic Indra go back to a reconstructed Proto-Indo-Iranian *Índras. However, its etymology beyond that is unclear. For instance, in a 1995 review paper, thirteen different hypotheses to its origin are presented.

== In the Avesta ==
In the Avesta, Indar is named Indra and appears only two times, both of which in the Vendidad. The first mention is found in chapter 10, where instructions are given on how to oppose the corrupting influence of dead bodies. The texts instructs the faithful to recite verses from the Gathas and to proclaim one's rejection of Ahriman (Vd. 10.5), Nasu (Vd. 10.6) as well as Indra, Saurwa, and Nåŋhaiθya (Vd. 10.9). The latter three are also known from the Vedic religion as Indra, Sarva (one of the names of Rudra) and Nasatya (another name of the Ashvins). The second mention is found in chapter 19 verse 43 (Vd. 19.43). Here, Indra is named directly after Ahriman and followed again by Saurwa, and Nåŋhaiθya.

== In Zoroastrian tradition ==
In later Zoroastrian tradition, Indar appears in a number of Middle Persian texts. In the Denkard, Indar is listed jointly with Ahriman and Savul as one of the beings one must not worship. In the Bundahishn, Indar is listed behind Akoman and before Saurwa, and Nåŋhaiθya, as one of the six arch daevas of Ahriman, which oppose the six Amesha Spentas of Ahura Mazda. The text also makes it clear, that Indar is the opponent of Asha Vahishta, the Amesha Spenta, representing Asha. According to the Wizidagiha-i Zadspram, Indar will be killed by Asha Vahishta during the final battle.

== Analysis ==
The place of Indar within the pantheon of Zoroastrianism is unclear. On the one hand, he only appears twice in the Avesta and has, consequently, been labeled as a minor figure. On the other hand, Indar appears usually in a prominent role, close to or even directly behind Ahriman himself. This indicates that he was perceived as a very powerful figure within the hierarchy of the deavas.

Another question, regards the relationship of the Iranian Indar, known from the Zoroastrian texts, with the Indian Indra, as depicted in the Vedas. Both the Iranian Indar and the Indian Indra are depicted as a powerful deava and deva, respectively. The main difference is that, whereas the Indian devas are the gods of the Vedic and Hindu pantheon, the daevas became increasingly demoted in Iran and eventually even demons. In addition, the Indian Indra has a number of traits, which in the Iranian tradition aren't associated with the increasingly evil Indar. Instead, they are connected with a number of positive figures like Verethragna and Mithra.
