= Sraosha =

God of prayer and hypostasis of obedience in Zoroastrianism

Soroush Avestan: 𐬯𐬭𐬀𐬊𐬴𐬀
- God of prayer, regent of the material world, protector of mankind, teacher of the religion
- Depiction of Soroush in Persian miniature
- Other names: Sarosh, Serosh, Sorush, Srosh, Sarosha, Saraosha, Sraosha
- Affiliation: The Thirty-Three Deities, Guardians of the Days of the Month
- Abode: Highest peak of mount Haraiti
- Weapons: The mighty wooden club, battle axe
- Attributes: Obedience, prayer, sacred word, ritual worship, protection against evil, guardianship of the material world, and guidance and judgment of souls
- Day: Seventeenth day of every month in the Zoroastrian calendar
- Texts: Avesta, Srosh Yasht
- Gender: Male
- Associated deities: Ohrmazd, Ashi, Mithra, Faravahar, Rashn, Amehraspands

Equivalents
- Christian: Gabriel
- Hindu: Brihaspati
- Islam: Jibril

Sraosha (Avestan: 𐬯𐬭𐬀𐬊𐬴𐬀) also known as Srōsh (Middle Persian: 𐭮𐭫𐭥𐭱) and Soroush (Persian: سروش; Sorūsh) is a yazata, the god of prayer and personification of obedience in Zoroastrianism. His name also carries the meanings of hearkening and discipline. He embodies the sacred word, was the first to recite the Gathas and to strew the barsom for worship, and is the teacher of the religion revealed to him by Ohrmazd. Sleepless and ever-watchful, he protects the material world from demonic forces, especially at night, and is the arch-nemesis of Aeshma, the demon of wrath.

Soroush appears in the Gathas beside the Amehraspands and is invoked by Zoroaster, while his possible pre-Zoroastrian origins remain uncertain. In later Zoroastrian tradition he became Ohrmazd's regent in the material world. His protection is invoked for the soul during the first three days after death, and he accompanies the dead to the Chinvat Bridge, where he joins Mithra and Rashn in the judgment of souls.

In later Persian literature Soroush appears as a divine messenger. In the Shahnameh, he intervenes in stories of kings and heroes, and in Hafez's poetry he brings tidings from the unseen world. Persian philosophical and mystical discussions also identify Soroush with Gabriel and connect him with the Holy Spirit and the Active Intellect.

== Etymology ==
A precise definition of the god's name probably eludes us. The Avestan name Soroush is written as 𐬯𐬭𐬀𐬊𐬴𐬀 (sraoṣ̌a) or 𐬯𐬆𐬭𐬀𐬊𐬴𐬀 (səraoṣ̌a). The divinity is also called a yazata of “Conscience” and “Observance”. In the Middle Persian commentaries of the 9th–12th centuries, the divinity appears as 𐭮𐭫𐭥𐭱, S(a)rosh. This form appears in many variants in New Persian as well, for example Sorūsh (سروش). Unlike many of the other Yazatas, Soroush is also frequently referred to as the "Angel of Conscience" or "Voice of Conscience", which overlaps with both of his role as the "Teacher of Daena", Daena being the hypostasis of both "Conscience" and "Religion" and Guardian/Companion over the Chinvat Bridge. Soroush is also the Persian name of the angel Gabriel in Abrahamic religions, specifically the angel Jibril in Islam. In Avestan, s(ə)raoša– occurs both as common noun and as a proper name. It is derived from an s-extension of √sraw-/sru– “to hear.” Both finite forms and nominal derivatives are formed. As a common IIr. verb, the basic meaning is “to obey, be compliant,” that is, “to hear and obey.” In Gathic Avestan a finite form occurs, səraošānē “I shall be obedient.” A primary derivative in –ti- is attested in Ved. śruṣṭí- “obedience” and GAv. asrušti– “disobedience.” Other derivatives in Av. are sraošyā– “punishment” (Xwar. swy “disciplinary action”), sraošin- “obedient, mindful,” sraošya– “deserving of discipline, punishment.” Thus, Soroush– falls within the semantic range of “harkening, obedience, discipline”, sraošō.carana– is the “instrument of (administering) obedience, punishment,” and the sraošāwarəza– is the individual who is the enforcer of obedience, discipline (including the rooster).

== Origins and historical development ==
No original myths are told of Soroush, and this is one reason why he has been held not to have been worshipped before Zoroaster. In India the “old” god Aryaman also lacks myths, and borrows picturesque traits when needed from other divinities, so that this is not a cogent argument against the antiquity of a concept. Owing to the richness of Soroush’s persona outside the Gathas, it is unlikely that he was a creation out of Zoroaster’s vision. Since there is no obvious counterpart in the Vedas, it may be concluded that he is a purely Iranian deity.

Soroush has a striking parallel in the Vedic Brihaspati, “Lord of Prayer”, who derives a number of epithets and traits from the warrior-god Indra. “Prayers and magic formulas are, together with the power of weapons, mighty disposers of battles; the priest accompanied the royal commander in the field. Beside Indra, the heroic god of battles, appears Brihaspati as a priestly god of battles”. A verse depicts Brihaspati in this role. “Fly around in your chariot, O Bṛhaspati, slaying the hostile, driving off enemies, shattering the host, crushing, victorious in battle, be you the helper of our chariots”. Prominent among the epithets of the Iranian Soroush are “victorious” (vanaitivant-, vərəthrajan-), “strong of arm” (bāzuš.aojah-), “with mighty club” (darši.dru-). Like Brihaspati he drives his chariot to help against foes, and he is called “heroic, swift, strong, mighty”, the one “who returns victorious from every battle”, who gives protection from “the armies of the wicked who bear the banner of blood”. Brihaspati is, however, a purely Indian divinity, Soroush a purely Iranian one. and although their development is in many respects parallel, there is nothing to show how ancient is the worship of each.

Like Ahrishwang, the name of the divinity Soroush appears in the Gathas together with the common noun with which it is identical. Zoroaster speaks of his own obedience to Ohrmazd, and seeks obedience from other men towards himself. Zoroaster associates Soroush, like Ahrishwang, with the Amehraspands of his own vision. “Then let Sraoša come with Vohu Manah (Bahman), O Mazdā, to whomsoever you will”. and once he even speaks of him as “greatest of all (vispā.mazišta-)”. Brihaspati is worshipped as the “father of the gods”. and Zoroaster himself, using presumably traditional terminology, calls Soroush “greatest of all”. Probably when he spoke these words the prophet was thinking of Soroush's greatness as being in his guardianship of prayer (through which man approaches God). Although Soroush is never part of the group of the Amehraspands appearing in later strata of the Avesta, in the Gathas he has a prominent place beside Aša, Bahman, and the others. A scholarly interpretation suggests that the reason why, of all the lesser beings of the Zoroastrian pantheon, Soroush and Ahrishwang are particularly mentioned in the Gathas is that they, like the seven great Immortals, have an especial connection with the religious services which seemingly provided the basis for Zoroaster's meditations. Soroush because he is tanu.mąthra “having the sacred word as body”, and so is represented by the liturgy itself (in the same way that the great Immortals are represented by the offerings, ritual objects and the celebrant).

Mithra's close companion, named in Mithra's own yašt, is Soroush. Both obedience and discipline are soldierly virtues, which might in itself help to explain Soroush's closeness to the warrior-god Mithra, from whom in fact he borrows many traits. It is probably as god of prayer that Soroush in his turn is so closely linked with the warrior-god Mithra. In the Zoroastrian texts he is at times associated with Neryosang, another divinity of prayer. He shares with Mithra and men an enigmatic epithet tanumąθra, which perhaps means “who embodies the holy word.” He also possesses high intelligence (bərəziδī-). Although there is no exact correspondence between the Yašts and the days of the month, Soroush has a fixed place between Mithra and Rashn, as in the sequence Yašts 10–11–12 and the days 16–17–18 of the month.

Soroush is also regularly linked with Ahrishwang, and like her he is mentioned in the Gathas. “Sraoša, accompanied by great-gifted Ashi, who shall apportion the rewards (ašīs) to the two groups...”. Soroush has in fact the epithet ashivant, “possessing rewards, rewarding”, which suggests both the closeness of his link with Ahrishwang and the part played by him at the individual judgment. Finally, Soroush has the standing epithet aṣ̌ya. As a secondary derivative of aṣ̌i, it has the sense of being connected in some way to aṣ̌i. However, it is unclear whether this means that he is a companion of the goddess Ahrishwang or that he is a source of rewards. In the Younger Avesta Soroush remains close to the seven Immortals, whereas his “sister” Ahrishwang is much less prominent. Perhaps this is partly because she, the giver of rewards, could not dwell in men's hearts as could the god Obedience and the others, and so she remained a little outside the inmost group of ethical divinities, all of whom can be immanent in man.

Soroush, Obedience or Discipline, is one of the most popular figures in Zoroastrianism. In later Zoroastrian tradition Soroush came to be venerated as Ohrmazd's regent on earth, with responsibility therefore to care for his especial creation, man. In living Zoroastrianism he is invoked accordingly more often than any divinity except Ohrmazd himself. Zoroastrian theologians seem to have developed this view, and gradually, as the difficult concept of Spənta Mainyu became absorbed in that of the Creator himself (for which again there is precedent in the Gathas), Soroush took over his function as protector of man, and was hailed as Ohrmazd's vice-regent here on earth. In living Zoroastrianism he receives accordingly more devotions than any other yazata. It is likely, however, that this was a gradual development. Possibly because of the paucity of preserved Avestan texts or because of historical developments, the Pahlavi literature, while continuing what is known from the Avesta, amplifies the roles of Soroush in a number of ways. Most striking is his association with Mihr and Ras. In the Avesta, all that is said is that in battle, “Mithra drives the frightened regiments hither, Rašnu drives them thither, Sraoša aṣ̌ya chases them everywhere”.

== Mythology and religious roles ==
In outward appearance he is handsome (huraoδa), tall (bərəza) and powerful in his arms (bāzuš.aojah). His youthfulness is emphasized in that he is the strongest, bravest, swiftest, fleetest and most dreaded from afar of youths (aojišta, tancišta, θβaxšišta, parō.katarštəma yūnąm). Elsewhere he is simply brave (taxma), swift (āsu) and powerful (aojahwant). He is bold (daršita), valorous (hąm.vərətiwant) and armed with a mighty wooden club (darši.dru). His palace, with its thousand pillars, is on the highest peak of Mount Haraiti. It is self-lit within, and lit by the stars without. He is drawn from there in his chariot by four beautiful white horses with swift golden feet.

Soroush is the yazata of Obedience and guardian of prayer. In Zoroastrianism he is outstandingly the god of prayer, and strong therefore to protect against the powers of evil. One of the characteristic epithets of the god Soroush is tanu.mąthra “having the sacred word for body”. Soroush is connected with harkening to the holy word (mąθra). In the non-Gāthic Avesta this role expands to include ritual, speech, and religion in general. Since Ohrmazd revealed the Religion to him, he is the teacher of the Religion. His hymn invokes him as the 'holy ritual chief'. According to his Yašt, he was the first to strew barsom (§ 6), the first to recite the five Gathas of Zoroaster (§ 8), and also the first to worship at the strewn barsom, clearly a priestly function. He was also the first to offer prayer to Ohrmazd. Soroush is present at every divine ceremony, for he is embodied in men's prayers and hymns, and as a god he conveys the prayers to heaven. In his warrior role, his weapon is the club, yet in his priestly function his weapons are the Ahuna Vairya prayer, his “victorious weapon,” the Yasna Haptaŋhāiti, the Fšūsō.mąθra, as well as all sacrificial acts.

He serves as guardian and protector. He is called most protective (θrātōtəma), a guardian (harətar) and overseer (aiβyāxštar). Even houses protected by Soroush (nmąna sraošō.pāta) are worshiped. The theme of Soroush’s protection of the world from demonic forces dominates his hymns. This seems to be the primary source of his popularity throughout the history of Zoroastrianism. “Three times the same day or the same night he descends to this continent, shining Xwaniratha, in his hand holding the weapon, sharp at the blade, easily wielded at the head(s) of the demons”. Soroush protects the world at night when the demons are on the prowl. Especially active at night, he has “not slept since the two Spirits created their creations” and “not falling asleep he guards and protects Ohrmazd’s creatures, he who protects the entire material world with his upraised weapon after sunset”. Although he routs the demons indiscriminately, Ohrmazd “created (him) as the antagonist of Aeshma (wrath) with the gory club”. Thus, “after sunset he smites Wrath with his shattering weapon (inflicting) a gory wound”. As protector, he wards off evil calamities and famines from this house, settlement, clan, and country, “in whose house he is satiated (with food and) treated with hospitality”.

Through his physical prowess he is a smasher of resistance (vərəθrājan) and a head smasher (kamərəδō.jan) of the daevas, which allows him to rule at will (vasō.xšaθra) and be conquering (vanwanah). As the Zoroastrian ritual is a potent force which destroys evil, Soroush is described as a warrior in armour, the best smiter of the Lie. With his battle axe he smashes the skulls of demons and hews down Ahriman, but he is opposed above all to Aeshma (Wrath). Soroush, as 'Obedience' and the embodiment of the sacred word, is the victorious force in the constant battle against the destructive forces of evil. The figure retains mythical imagery despite its abstract nature.

The night was probably assigned in paganism entirely to the fravahr, as a time of dread. and again it is likely to have been Zoroaster himself who divided it into two, leaving the first half to the fravahrs of the righteous, but assigning the second to Soroush, lord of prayer. and the strenuous practice was required of the faithful of praying twice during the hours of darkness, once in Aiwisrūthra, from the first glimmer of stars until midnight, and once during Ušah, from midnight until dawn. In every twenty-four-hour day one watch is dedicated to the fravahrs, namely Aiwisrūthra, the time between sunset and midnight. There is something a little baneful about this period, for the powers of evil seem felt to be gathering strength during it, before the forces of good rally to smite them during Ušah, the watch from midnight to dawn, which for Zoroastrians is under the protection of Soroush. It is forbidden in their usage to solemnise any of the high rituals in Aiwisrūthra, or even to make preparations for them. If haoma is to be made ready, or water drawn, or milk procured, these things must be done in the daylight hours, or under the protection of Soroush, but not while the fravAhrishwangs are abroad.

In general, Soroush, with other deities, is a promoter of the material world (frādat̰.gaēθa). Soroush’s prowess in combating demons and protecting the material world contributes to his apparent elevation to a position of near equal earthly authority with Ohrmazd. Thus, “Srōš holds the material world (Getig) through the performance of protection (by command) from Ohrmazd. Just as Ohrmazd is ruler in the spiritual world (Menog) and the material, Soroush is the ruler of the material world. Ohrmazd is the protector of the soul in the spiritual world and Soroush is the protector of the body in the material world”. His “proper function (xwēškārīh), the defense and protection of the those living in the material world, is by the command of the Creator”. The Pahlavi Rivāyat accompanying the Dādestān ī Dēnīg explains Soroush’s separate worship, unlike the other deities worshiped together with Ohrmazd. It calls him the lord and ruler (xwadāy ud dahibed) of the world. In contrast to the Soroush Yašt, where he comes down to the central continent, Xwaniratha, in the Pahlavi books he exercises his sovereignty (xwadāyīh) mostly in Arzah and Sawah, but also in Ērānwēz. This sovereignty further became a model for earthly rulers.

Since Zoroaster seems to have accepted the age-old belief that the soul lingered on earth for three days after leaving the body, this period was naturally one for especial prayers and observances on its behalf. The characteristic points about Zoroastrian observances seem the use of some of the prophet's own words as mathras at the time of disposing of the body, and the performance of ceremonies on the soul's behalf dedicated to Soroush, the yazata of prayer, and a powerful protector against evil. In current usage (which is probably that of the earliest times also) the body, being nasā, is removed as soon as possible, preferably on the same day. but this can be done only while the sun shines, so if death takes place late in the afternoon or at night the funeral must wait till the following day. The corpse-bearers recite the opening part of the Soroush Bāj, which includes the Kəm-nā Mazdā, before they approach the body, making paiwand between themselves by holding the ends of a cord. and thereafter they maintain silence throughout their work, until they have set the body down in the place of exposure (however far away this may be) and have withdrawn from there. They then “leave” the bāj by reciting its closing prayers, having thus kept themselves the whole time under the protection of Soroush. In respect to the deceased, Soroush is to be invoked to protect the soul for the first three days after death, as it hovers in a liminal situation threatened by demonic powers. On the fourth day, as psycho-pomp, he escorts the soul to the bridge, where judgment takes place.

In the Gathas Soroush is referred to, in association with Ahrishwang, as apportioning rewards and punishments. but it is not said which divinity indicates “by the pointings of the hand” the way which the soul is to take after its trial. Ahrishwang is not directly concerned with the judgment in the tradition, and in the Gathas she is subordinated in this connection to Soroush. According to the tradition the judgment is carried out by a tribunal of three yazatas. Mithra, lord of the covenant, unswerving in his equity, presides over it, with Soroush and Rašnu as his fellow judges. It is he who greets and watches over the soul at death. With Mithra and Rashn he presides over the judgment of the soul (see p. 64). In the later tradition these three deities play a major role in the judgment of the deceased’s soul and in its conveyance to the reward it has earned, as they sit at the Cinwad Bridge.

The righteous Viraf is said to have been transported in a vision to heaven and hell so that he could tell the faithful what awaited them. His writings contain a description of heaven. Led over the Chinvat bridge by Soroush and other heavenly beings, he was met on the other side by the heavenly fravashis who conducted him to Hamestagen, the abode of those whose good and evil deeds are equal. At the Frašegird Soroush accompanies Ohrmazd for the judgment of the souls. At that time he also smites the demon Āz as well as his arch-enemy Aeshma.

== Survival in the Islamic period ==
=== In the Shahnameh ===
As in the Avesta and Pahlavi texts, Soroush also has a prominent presence in the Shahnameh and is often accompanied by the epithets “blessed” and “auspicious.” Soroush appears from the very first story of the Shahnameh. In the story of Kayumars, the first king, Ahriman envies him, and Ahriman's offspring, jealous of the good fortune of Kayumars's son (Siamak), gathers an army and marches against him. Soroush appears before Siamak in the form of a leopard-clad fairy and informs him of the situation. Siamak goes to war against Ahriman's offspring but is killed by him. Soroush is a divine messenger whom Ferdowsi depicts in the form of a Pari. Here, a contradiction appears between Zoroastrian beliefs, which regard Paris as demonic beings, and the Iranian-Islamic understanding of Paris as good, benevolent, and beautiful beings. Ferdowsi has the latter meaning in mind. Kayumars mourns his son for a year, after which Soroush once again appears as a divine messenger to console him and encourage him to seek vengeance against the daeva. Soroush appears before Kayumars as a messenger from God, but in human form, and urges him to fight against Ahriman, fulfilling the same role that the Zoroastrian Soroush performs in his struggle against demons. For the same reason, in the story of Siamak's death, Soroush asks Kayumars to stop mourning Siamak and instead avenge his blood by fighting Ahriman.

Soroush acts as God's messenger in his third appearance in the Shahnameh, in the story of Zahhak. When Fereydun defeats Zahhak and intends to destroy him, Soroush arrives and prevents him from killing Zahhak, instructing him instead to imprison Zahhak on Mount Damavand. When Fereydun takes Zahhak toward the mountain, he once again intends to kill him. Soroush appears before him again, prevents him from killing Zahhak, and instructs him merely to imprison him in a place far from people, whispering the wisdom behind this action into his ear as a secret. “Take this prisoner to Mount Damavand / Bring this Arab, without his followers, there”. Brief references to this story also appear in certain Pahlavi texts, such as the ninth book of the Denkard and the Menog-i Khrad. There, Soroush tells Fereydun that the time for Zahhak's death has not yet arrived and that his duty is only to imprison him, because Zahhak's destruction must take place at the end of the world at the hands of Garshasp. This is the secret Soroush reveals to Fereydun, although the Shahnameh does not disclose it.

In the story of the battle between Khosrow Parviz and Bahram Chobin, when Khosrow finds himself unable to defeat Bahram, he takes refuge in a cave, raises his hands toward God, and asks for divine assistance. Soroush appears as a helpful divine messenger. After bringing Khosrow the good news of his future kingship and advising him to remain righteous, Soroush disappears. Ferdowsi calls Soroush an angel because, according to Iranian-Islamic conceptions, Soroush can no longer be a deity. Because lamentation and wailing are considered undesirable practices in Zoroastrianism, when Soroush informs Khosrow that God will assist him and that he will become king, he tells him to stop lamenting, crying out, and mourning. In Zoroastrianism, wailing and lamentation during funerary ceremonies are also strongly condemned. Soroush wears green clothing. In certain sources from the Islamic period, green was an important color during the Sasanian era. The crowns and garments of some Sasanian kings were green, and green also holds particular importance in Islamic tradition, where angels wear green garments.

Another manifestation of Soroush in the Shahnameh is his appearance in the dreams of heroes and kings, informing them of events that will occur in the future. Prominent figures in the Shahnameh experience dreams in which they foresee an event before it happens at least once. Even tyrannical kings dream of the eventual downfall of their unjust rule and their own destruction. Among them are Afrasiab and Zahhak, who attempt to change their fate but cannot escape their destiny. In the story of Kay Khosrow, Soroush appears three times in the dreams of the characters. Following Afrasiab's invasion of Iran, the Iranians suffer hardship for seven years. One night, Gudarz, an Iranian hero, dreams that Soroush, riding upon a cloud, shows him the path to deliverance. Soroush tells Gudarz that among all the distinguished men of Iran, only Giv knows of Kay Khosrow's whereabouts and can find him and bring him to Iran. Gudarz summons his son Giv and sends him in search of Kay Khosrow. Elsewhere in the story, during the battle between Kay Khosrow and Afrasiab, when Afrasiab takes refuge in the mountains, Soroush appears in the dream of a wool-clad ascetic named Hom and reveals Afrasiab's hiding place. Hom captures him, but Afrasiab escapes. Eventually, Kay Khosrow captures and kills him. After his war against Afrasiab and his destruction of him, Kay Khosrow becomes weary and disillusioned with worldly affairs and wishes to withdraw from them. He therefore decides to abdicate the throne. Soroush appears to him in a dream and instructs him to help the needy and the poor, for he has little time remaining in this world. The Iranians are saddened by his decision to withdraw, and he reveals his secret to them as follows. “He saw in a dream that blessed Soroush / Secretly spoke into his ear: / O fortunate king, blessed by the stars, / You have long possessed the crown and throne. / If you hasten to depart from this world, / You have now attained everything you sought”.

Ferdowsi skillfully combines pre-Islamic and post-Islamic cultural traditions. The Zoroastrian features of the Soroush myth, in which he functioned as a deity and constantly fought against demons in ancient accounts, gradually faded with the dominance of Islamic culture. In the Shahnameh, he becomes an angel and an unseen divine messenger who, in addition to conveying the Creator's commands to His servants, comes to the assistance of righteous people, kings, and heroes at decisive moments in their lives and announces their coming victories. He is a blessed and auspicious messenger.

=== Persian poetry and Islamic philosophy ===
In the Avesta Soroush is the only divinity to have two hymns in his honour, and subsequently he became the only Zoroastrian divine being to be honoured in Islamic Iran, where he is known as Soroush, the angel who carries messages between God and men, owing to his great popularity.

In mystical texts, in agreement with the Quranic dictum, belief in the ghayb is also equated with faith. But while in many instances God is said to be unique in His knowledge of the ghayb, there are equally many instances where Sufis are said to have a ‘way into the ghayb’. For the Persian mystics, ghayb is the supra-sensory realm beyond discursive knowledge, whose existence is attested by every manner of the attributes of divine manifestation such as ‘true dreams’ (ru’yā ṣādiqa), divine inspiration (ilhām), and by the mystics’ ‘inner’ experience of a spiritual journey (sayr va sulûk-e bāṭin). In many mystical texts the ghayb is considered a realm beyond time and space. ‘there is no yesterday, today and tomorrow in the realm of ghayb... there is no extension of time there. Whatever is and whatever will be are all there,’ writes the celebrated Persian mystic Aziz al-Din Nasafi. In the same type of mystical texts the ghayb is made known to humans by the intervention of angels who imprint ‘unseen’ forms in the heart of man. Knowledge of ‘unseen’ divine mystery may be obtained according to the mystics by (a) the intervention of angels. (b) the ‘experience’ of gnosis (ma‘rifa); or (c) divine inspiration and personal revelation (mukāshafa, mushāhada wa ilhām). Medieval Arabic and Persian philosophical and mystical texts commonly equate the Holy Spirit (Rûḥ al-Qudus) with the Archangel Gabriel and with the Active Intellect, and being ‘related’ to it does imply ‘miraculous’ powers. Illuminationist philosophical allegories in Iran use Jamshid's Cup as a metaphor for the Active Intellect. To ‘possess Jamshid’s Cup is equated with ‘connection’ (ittiṣāl) or ‘union’ (ittiḥād) with the Active Intellect. Those who possess the Cup, it is further interpreted, are the ones given divine ‘inspiration’ (ilhām) by the angel Gabriel, named Ravān Bakhsh (dator spiritus) in Persian, and identified with the angel Sorûsh of Iranian mythology. Hafez, like authors of the philosophical allegories, allows a potential access by every individual to the Cup. The individual in possession of the Cup knows the ‘secrets of the unseen’, and is equated with prophet-like, divinely inspired poets.

Biographers of Hafez also report that his poetic genius is discussed in terms of an inspiration by the Holy Spirit (Rûḥ al-Qudus). This is a significant identification, since inspiration and emanation received from the Holy Spirit is equated on the one hand with being informed by the angel Gabriel (or its Persian counterpart the angel Soroush), and on the other with access to unbound poetic knowledge that results from conjunction with the Active Intellect or the obtaining of unrestricted Knowledge by Presence, and are indicative of prophet-like qualities. Jan Rypka identifies the following possible reasons for the epithet. ‘They named him lisānul’-ghayb, “the tongue of secrets”, referring to his alleged mysticism. Others take this expression to mean that his verses are free from artificialities or that his dîvān, like the Quran, can be consulted to interpret the future’. Ziai identifies Rypka as one of the few historians of Persian literature who discuss the epithet, but considers those explanations and the vague notion of an “alleged mysticism” insufficient to explain the phenomenon of a prophet-like “tongue of the unseen”. That the Dîvān is consulted to ‘interpret the future’ does confirm, however, the view that Hafez ‘is considered to have received emanation from the ‘Holy Spirit’. The epistemological question concerns how the ‘tongue of the unseen’ can ‘interpret the future’, as well as its other miracle-like implications. In Ziai’s interpretation, the epithet would give Hafez the elevated rank of a ‘prophet-like’ figure, and Lisān al-Ghayb would thus carry the weight of the sage-poet who, inspired by the divine, acts as the recipient of God’s emanation, and then relates the divine message to man.

All three ways of ‘access’ to the ghayb are found in the poems of Hafez. The angel Soroush serves as the messenger of the Unseen and brings “news” or “good tidings” to the poet. “Bring me some wine! Last night, Sorûsh angel of the unseen world, Brought me splendid news: His Grace does emanate upon us all”. “Sorûsh, angel of the unseen world, brought me good tidings: No one will remain untouched by His Grace”. “What can I tell you: Last night, when drunk in the tavern, Such good tidings did Sorûsh, angel of the unseen, bring me”. In other poems, Hafez calls the angel the “messenger of the unseen”. “Come, o cup bearer! Messenger of the unseen gave me good tidings: ‘Remain patient with pain! I will send you the potion’”. “At dawn, messenger of the unseen world gave me good tidings: ‘Now is the reign of Shāh-Shujā‘ drink boldly of wine’”. “Last night I asked: ‘Will the beauty of her lips cure my afflicted heart?’ Messenger of the unseen cried out: ‘Yes, it will’”. The Divine continuously bestows of His Being upon the poets, usually through the angel Soroush (the Iranian equivalent of the archangel Gabriel), as in a poem by Hâfez. “Give me wine! Last night, Sorûsh, angel of the unseen world, Brought me splendid news: His Grace does emanate upon us all”. The poet-philosopher continues to serve as the link between the human and the divine, between the noumena and the phenomena, the seen and the unseen, and thus keeps open the doors of divine inspiration. The Unseen World continues to manifest itself to him until the time when he attains such a degree of sagacity, possessing wisdom, that he is designated Lisān al-Ghayb, Tongue of the Unseen, the well known epithet of Hafez which points to the paradigmatic role of the poet and indicates his position in the epistemological structure outlined above.

== Sources ==
- Asmussen, Jes Peter (1983), "Aēšma", Encyclopaedia Iranica, vol. 1, New York: Routledge & Kegan Paul, pp. 479–480.
- Dhalla, Maneckji Nusservanji (1938), History of Zoroastrianism, New York: OUP, p. 182.
- Malandra, William W. (2014). "Sraoša". Encyclopædia Iranica, online edition. New York.
- Minardi, Michele (2021). "The Image of the Zoroastrian God Srōsh: New Elements". Ancient Civilizations from Scythia to Siberia. 27 (1). Brill: 154–173. doi:10.1163/15700577-12341389. S2CID 237733753.
