= Aeshma =

Zoroastrian Daeva of wrath

Aeshma (Avestan: 𐬀𐬉𐬴𐬨𐬀 aēṣ̌ma; Old Avestan: 𐬀𐬉𐬱𐬆𐬨𐬀 aēšəma) is the Younger Avestan name of Zoroastrianism's demon of "wrath". As a hypostatic entity, Aeshma is variously interpreted as "wrath", "rage", and "fury". His standard epithet is "of the bloody mace".

Tri-syllabic aeshma is already attested in Gathic Avestan as aēšəma, though not yet—at that early stage—as an entity. The word has an Indo-Iranian root, descendant of the Proto-Indo-European root *h₁eish₂- ‘strengthen; propel’, making it cognate with Ancient Greek oîma (οἶμα) ‘spring, rush’, Latin īra ‘wrath’, and Lithuanian aistrà ‘violent passion’. In the Zoroastrian texts of the 9th–12th centuries, aeshma appears as Middle Persian eshm 𐭠𐭩𐭱𐭬 or 𐭧𐭩𐭱𐭬 kheshm, continuing in Pazend and New Persian as خشم xašm. Judaism's Asmodeus (Hebrew: אַשְמְדּאָי ʼšmdʼy) may derive from Avestan aeshma.daeva. The Georgian language word for devil—eshmaki—likewise derives from aeshma.

== In scripture ==
In the hierarchy of Zoroastrian demons (daevas) that mirrors a similar hierarchy of divinities, Aeshma is opposed to Asha Vahishta, the Amesha Spenta that is the hypostasis of "Truth". This opposition also reflects Aeshma's position as messenger of Angra Mainyu (Yasht 19.46), for in the hierarchy of divinities, Asha is the messenger of Spenta Mainyu, the instrument through which Ahura Mazda has realized ("created by His thought") creation.

The demon's chief adversary, however, is Sraosha "Obedience", the principle of religious devotion and discipline. The opposition between religious obedience and distraction from it is also expressed in the Yasna 10.8's portrayal of Aeshma as the metaphysical endangerment of the Good Religion. Aeshma distracts from proper worship, distorting "the intention and meaning of sacrifice through brutality against cattle and violence in war and drunkenness." (Yasna 10.8, Yasht 17.5)

According to Yasht 11.15, Ahura Mazda created Sraosha to counter the demon's mischief, and in Yasna 57.25, Sraosha protects the faithful from the fiend's assault. At the renovation of the world, Sraosha overthrows Aeshma, who will flee before the saoshyant (Yasht 19.95), but in the present the fiend flees before Mithra (Yasna 57.10; Yasht 10.97).

The demon's opposition to Sraosha is also reflected in their respective standard epithets. While Aeshma's is xrvi.dru- "of the bloody mace" (e.g. Yasna 10.8, Yasht 11.15), Sraosha's is darshi.dru- "of the strong (Ahuric) mace." Aeshma's other epithet's include "ill-fated" (Yasht 10.95) "malignant" (Yasna 57.25, Yasht 10.97), and "possessing falsehood" (drvant-, Yasht 10.93). In Yasht 19.97, the demon has the epithet "having his body forfeited," but what is meant by this is uncertain.

Aeshma can be driven away by the recitation of a prayer. (Vendidad 11.9)

== In tradition and folklore ==
In the Zoroastrian texts of the 9th–12th centuries, the function of battling Aeshma is also ascribed to Mithra (Zand-i Wahman yasn 7.34), and Denkard 3.116 places him in opposition to Vohu Manah. The demon is made commander by Angra Mainyu (Zatspram 34.32) and although he is closely related to Az, the demon of "avarice", Az will eventually swallow him up. The opposition to Sraosha is continued into the later tradition.

In the even later Rivayats (epistles), a Yasna ceremony that is not properly executed is said to have been done as if the ceremony were for Aeshma.

Late Zoroastrian text, the Mēnog ī xrad, says following the death of Jam ī Xšēd (Jamshid), Dahāg (Zahhak) gained kingly rule. This was ultimately good, because if Dahāg had not become king, the rule would have been taken by the immortal demon Xešm (Aēšma), and so evil would have ruled upon the earth until the end of the world.

== Bibliography ==
- Asmussen, Jes Peter (1983), "Aēšma", Encyclopaedia Iranica, vol. 1, New York: Routledge & Kegan Paul, pp. 479–480.
- Dhalla, Maneckji N. (1938), History of Zoroastrianism, New York: OUP.
- Russell, James (2001), "God Is Good: On Tobit and Iran", Iran and the Caucasus, vol. 5, pp. 1–6.
