= Aka Manah =

Negative entity in Zoroastrianism

Aka Manah is the Avestan language name for the Zoroastrian daeva "Evil Mind", "Evil Purpose", "Evil Thinking", or "Evil Intention". Aka Manah also known as Akoman in Middle Persian and Akvan in New Persian, represents the malevolent force of sensual desire that was sent by Ahriman to seduce the prophet Zoroaster. His eternal opponent is Vohu Manah. Aka Manah is the hypostatic abstraction of accusative akem manah (akәm manah), "manah made evil". The objectification of this malign influence is the demon Aka/Akem Manah, who appears in later texts as Middle Persian Akoman and New Persian Akvan.

== In scripture ==
=== In the Gathas ===
The concept of akem manah is already attested in the Gathas, the oldest texts of Zoroastrianism and believed to have been composed by Zoroaster himself.

In two of the three instances where the term is used in these ancient texts, akem manah is an attribute of humans. In Yasna 33.4, the poet promises to counter his own "disobedience and aka manah" through worship. In Yasna 47.5, aka manah is the motivation (the state of mind) that causes deceitful actions. In the third instance where the term appears, Akem Manah is a property of the daevas, entities that in later Zoroastrianism are demons but in the Gathas are gods that are to be rejected. There, in Yasna 32.3, the daevas are identified as the offspring, not of angra mainyu, but of akem manah.

Related to, but not entirely equivalent to akem manah, are other terms that express similar ideas. The first is aka mainyu "evil spirit" or "evil instrument," which in the Gathas is contrasted with spenta mainyu "bounteous spirit," the instrument through which Ahura Mazda realized ("with his thought") creation. The other term is angra mainyu "destructive spirit," which in Zoroastrian tradition is the epitome of evil, but in the Gathas is the other absolute antitheses of spenta mainyu.

Gathic akem manah may also be equated with acishtem manah "worst thinking," which reflects the later Zoroastrian opposition between akem manah and vohu manah, "good purpose." In Yasna 32.13, the abode of the wicked is acishtem manah.

=== In the Younger Avesta ===
In the Younger Avesta, Akem Manah is unambiguously a demonic entity, an auxiliary of Angra Mainyu.

In Yasht 19.46, Aka Manah, Aeshma, Azi Dahaka and Spityura battle Vohu Manah, Asha Vahishta and Atar for the possession of khvarenah. Later in the same hymn (19.96), Aka Manah is predicted to be in battle with Vohu Manah at the final renovation of the world, at which time Aka Manah – as all the other daevas also - will be vanquished.

In Vendidad 19's account of the temptation of Zoroaster, Aka Manah poses ninety-nine questions to weaken the prophet's conviction in Ahura Mazda. Zoroaster does not succumb to the trick.

== In tradition and folklore ==
=== In the Pahlavi texts ===
In the Zoroastrian texts of the 9th-12th centuries, Akoman (Middle Persian for Akem Manah) is the second of Ahriman's (MP for Angra Mainyu) creatures (Bundahishn 1.24), devised to counter Ohrmuzd's (Ahura Mazda's) creation of the world. This rank reflects Akem Manah's opposition to Vohu Manah (cf. Bundahishn 30.29), who is the second of the Amesha Spentas.

Also reflecting the hierarchy that mirrors the Amesha Spentas and in which each of the "bounteous immortals" has collaborators (hamkars), Akoman has a special relationship with Anashtih "non-peace". Akoman is also close to Varun/Varan "lust" or "concupiscence," together with whom (so Denkard 3.33) was created.

In the Epistles of Zadspram (14.8), Akoman is first among the demons who try to injure Zoroaster before and at his birth. He was however "easily defeated by his own weapon of deceit being turned against him. Vohuman, who had chased him to the spot, schemingly turned back and asked him to enter the house. Akoman thought that as his rival was leaving the place, his own work was finished, and consequently [left as well] without accomplishing anything."

The ability to make righteous decisions is blunted by Akoman (Denkard 3.116). He is the cause of evil intent, and a mortal so afflicted searches for "gross defects" in others while hiding his own (3.255). Denkard 8 attributes the crying of new-born infants to Akoman, reasoning that the demon frightens the children with ghastly images of the final renovation of the world.

According to Denkard 9.30.8 (reflecting chapter 7.8 of the Warsht-mansr Nask, a lost Avestan text), Akoman causes a mortal's failure to discriminate between good and evil. He so introduces discord and - as a consequence - physical evil in the world (Denkard 6). He perverts a man's thoughts and makes him miserable.

Among all the demons, Akoman is to be dreaded the most (Denkard 9).

=== In the Shahnameh ===
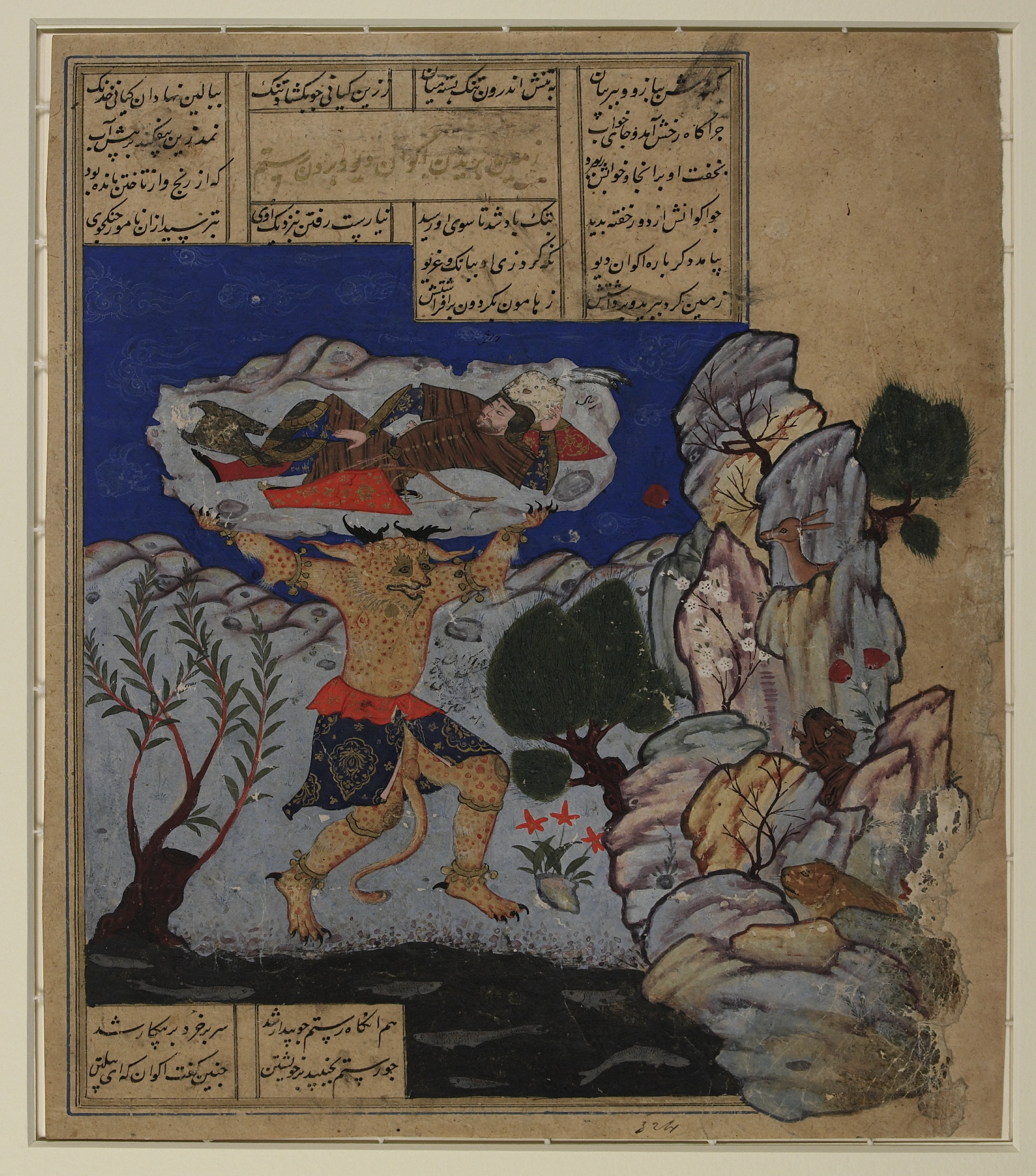
Akvan e Div digs up the ground around the Rostam, Library of Congress, 16th-17th centuries

In Ferdowsi's Shahnameh, Akvan is described as having long hair, blue eyes and a head like an elephant with a mouthful of tusks instead of teeth.

In one of the tales, the demon traps Rostam while the hero is asleep, and carries him up into the sky. He then asks Rostam whether he would prefer to be thrown upon a mountain, or into the sea. Rostam, aware that the demon's mind is perverse (cf. In the Pahlavi texts above), asks to be thrown upon a mountain, and the demon in response throws him into the sea. Rescuing himself from the waters, Rostam recovers his horse and confronts the demon again, subsequently beheading it.

Another story has an oblique reference to a "Stone of Akvan", suggesting that there were once other legends surrounding Akvan/Akoman that have not however survived.

== Bibliography ==
- Dhalla, Maneckji N. (1938), History of Zoroastrianism, New York: OUP, pp. 399–400
- Duchesne-Guillemin, Jacques (1982a), "Ahriman", Encyclopaedia Iranica, vol. 1, New York: Routledge & Kegan Paul, pp. 670–673
- Duchesne-Guillemin, Jaques (1982b), "Akōman", Encyclopaedia Iranica, vol. 1, New York: Routledge & Kegan Paul, pp. 728–729
- Khaleghi-Motlagh, Djalal (1982), "Akvān-e dīv", Encyclopaedia Iranica, vol. 1, New York: Routledge & Kegan Paul, p. 740
