= Book of Arda Viraf =

Zoroastrian religious text

The Book of Arda Viraf (Middle Persian: Ardā Wirāz nāmag, lit. 'Book of the Righteous Wirāz') is a Zoroastrian text written in Middle Persian. It contains about 8,800 words. It describes the dream-journey of a devout Zoroastrian (the Wirāz of the story) through the next world. The text assumed its definitive form in the 11th–12th centuries after a series of redactions and it is probable that the story was an original product of 9th–10th century Pars.

== Title ==
Ardā (cf. aša (pronounced arta) cognate with Sanskrit ṛta) is an epithet of Wirāz and is approximately translatable as "truthful, righteous, just." Wirāz is probably akin to Proto-Indo-European *wiHro--, "man", cf. Persian: bīr Avestan: vīra. Given the ambiguity inherent to Pahlavi scripts in the representing the pronunciation of certain consonants, Wirāz, the name of the protagonist, may also be transliterated as Wiraf or Viraf, but the Avestan form is clearly Virāza, which suggests that the correct reading is z. Nāmag means "book".

== Textual history ==
The date of the book is not known, but in The Sacred Books and Early Literature of the East, Prof. Charles Horne does not provide a definitive date for the tale. Most modern scholars simply state that the text's terminus ad quem was the 9th or 10th century.

According to translator of the text, Fereydun Vahman, the origin of the story probably goes back to the 9th or 10th century and was from the Pars region. The Encyclopædia Iranica indicates that the story of the completion of his liberation after the Islamic conquest of Persia

The introductory chapter indicates a date after the Arab conquest and was apparently written in Pars. It is probably one of the 9th or 10th century literary products of the province. A linguistic analysis supports this view.

According to Encyclopædia Iranica, the story's definitive form goes back to the 9th to 10th century:

The Arda Wiraz-namag, like many of the Zoroastrian works, underwent successive redactions. It assumed its definitive form in the 9th-10th centuries AD, as may be seen in the texts frequent Persianisms, usages known to be characteristic of early Persian literature.

== Plot summary ==
Wirāz is chosen for his piety to undertake a journey to the next world in order to prove the truth of Zoroastrian beliefs, after a period when the land of Iran had been troubled by the presence of confused and alien religions. He drinks a mixture of wine, mang, and Haoma, after which his soul travels to the next world. Here he is greeted by a beautiful woman named Dēn, who represents his faith and virtue. Crossing the Chinvat Bridge, he is then conducted by "Srosh, the pious and Adar, the yazad" through the "star track", "moon track" and "sun track" – places outside of heaven reserved for the virtuous who have nevertheless failed to conform to Zoroastrian rules. In heaven, Wirāz meets Ahura Mazda who shows him the souls of the blessed (ahlaw, an alternate Middle Persian version of the word ardā). Each person is described living an idealised version of the life he or she lived on earth, as a warrior, agriculturalist, shepherd or other profession. With his guides he then descends into hell to be shown the sufferings of the wicked. Having completed his visionary journey, Wirāz is told by Ahura Mazda that the Zoroastrian faith is the only proper and true way of life and that it should be preserved in both prosperity and adversity.

== Quotes ==
- They say that, once upon a time, the pious Zartosht made the religion, which he had received, current in the world; and till the completion of 300 years, the religion was in purity, and men were without doubts. But afterward, the accursed evil spirit, the wicked one, in order to make men doubtful of this religion, instigated the accursed Alexander, the Rûman, who was dwelling in Egypt, so that he came to the country of Iran with severe cruelty and war and devastation; he also slew the ruler of Iran, and destroyed the metropolis and empire, and made them desolate.
  - Introduction
- Then I saw the souls of those whom serpents sting and ever devour their tongues. And I asked thus: 'What sin was committed by those, whose soul suffers so severe a punishment?' Srosh the pious, and Adar the yazad, said, thus: 'These are the souls of those liars and irreverent [or 'untruthful'] speakers who, in the world, spoke much falsehood and lies and profanity.
  - Section 4, Hell

== See also ==
- Divine Comedy
- Middle Persian literature
- Persian literature
- Ascension of Jesus
- Isra' and Mi'raj
