= Daeva =

Demon, ogre or giant from Persian mythology

Div or dev (Classical Persian: دیو dēw; Iranian Persian: دیو dīv; with the broader meaning of demons, ogres or fiends), also known as Daeva (Avestan: 𐬛𐬀𐬉𐬎𐬎𐬀 daēuua) are monstrous creatures of Iranian folklore and religion and Zoroastrian supernatural entities with disagreeable characteristics. In the Gathas, the oldest texts of the Zoroastrian canon, the divs are "gods that are (to be) rejected". This meaning is – subject to interpretation – perhaps also evident in the Old Persian "daiva inscription" of the 5th century BC. Div, the Iranian language term, shares the same origin of "Deva" of Hinduism, which is a cognate with Latin deus ("god") and Greek Zeus. While the word for the Vedic spirits and the word for the Zoroastrian entities are etymologically related, their function and thematic development are altogether different. Originally, the term was used to denote beings of cultural folklore which predate use in scripture. Equivalents for Persian dīv/deev in Iranian languages include Avestan daeva, Pashto, Balochi, and Kurdish dêw The Iranian word was borrowed by Old Armenian as dew, Georgian as devi, Urdu as deo with the same negative associations in those languages. In English, the word appears as daeva, div, deev, and in the 18th century fantasy novels of William Thomas Beckford as dive.

In the Younger Avesta, the divs are divinities that promote chaos and disorder. In later tradition and folklore, they are personifications of every imaginable evil, while In legends, they are often described as having a body like that of a human, only of gigantic size, with two horns upon their heads and teeth like the tusks of a boar. Powerful, cruel and cold-hearted, they have a particular relish for the taste of human flesh. Some use only primitive weapons, such as stones: others, more sophisticated, are equipped like warriors, wearing armour and using weapons of metal. Despite their uncouth appearance — and in addition to their great physical strength — many are also masters of sorcery, capable of overcoming their enemies by magic and afflicting them with nightmares. In the Shahnameh they are the main-antagonists of the hero Rostam.

Most of their images, after disseminating into the Islamic world, including Armenia, Turkic countries, and Albania, assimilated with the demons and ogres of ancestral beliefs. As such they have been adapted according to the beliefs of Islamic concepts of otherworldly entities. Muslim authors often identified them with the ʿifrīt (demons) and shayāṭīn (devils) of their own belief-system. According to Islamic hagiographic legends, Satan once defeated the div and jinn but joined their ranks after he fell from God's grace. Like other creatures, Islam considers divs to be subject to God's rule and final judgement. In Sufism they are symbols of human vices and evil urges. It has been speculated that the concept of the divs as a malevolent force may have been inspired from the Scythian gods.

== History and interpretation ==
Old Avestan daēuua or daēva derives from Old Iranian *daiva, which in turn derives from Indo-Iranian *daivá- "god", reflecting Proto-Indo-European *deywós with the same meaning. For other Indo-European derivatives, see Dyeus. The Vedic Sanskrit cognate of Avestan daēuua is devá-, continuing in later Indo-Aryan languages as dev.

Because all cognates of Iranian *daiva have a positive connotation, but "no known Iranian dialect attests clearly and certainly the survival of a positive sense for [Old Iranian] *daiva-", in the 19th- and 20th-century a great deal of academic discussion revolved around questions of how Iranian div might have gained its derogatory meaning. This "fundamental fact of Iranian linguistics" is "impossible" to reconcile with the testimony of the Gathas, where the divs, though rejected, were still evidently gods that continued to have a following. The same is true of the daiva inscription, where the daiva are the gods of (potential) rebels, but still evidently gods that continued to have a following.

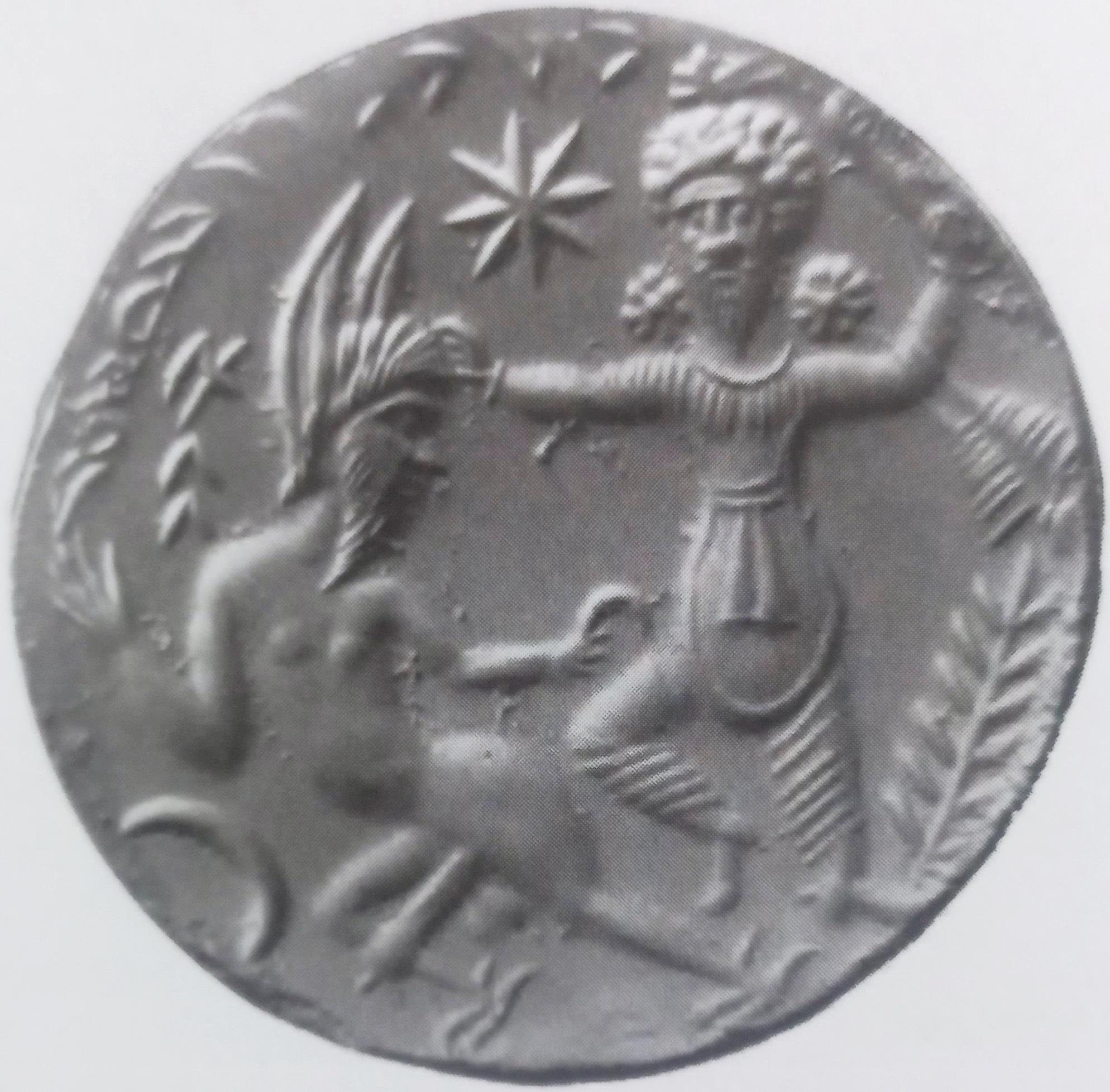
An apotropaic Sasanian seal from the late 3rd or early 4th century CE, depicting a royal figure slaying a div.

The old Persian daiva occurs twice in Xerxes' daiva inscription (XPh, early 5th century BC). This trilingual text also includes one reference to a daivadana "house of the daivas", generally interpreted to be a reference to a shrine or sanctuary. In his inscription, Xerxes records that "by the favour of Ahura Mazda I destroyed that establishment of the daivas and I proclaimed, 'The daivas thou shalt not worship!'" This statement has been interpreted either one of two ways. Either the statement is an ideological one and daivas were gods that were to be rejected, or the statement was politically motivated and daivas were gods that were followed by (potential) enemies of the state.

The issue is related to the question of how Zoroaster's own contribution to Iranian religion might be defined. In the older early/mid 20th-century view (so-called reform hypothesis), in which Zoroaster was perceived to be a revolutionary reformer, it was assumed that the divs must have been the "national" gods (see comparison with Indic usage, below) of pre-Zoroaster-ian Iran, which Zoroaster had then rejected. This attribution to Zoroaster is also found in the 9th/10th-century books of Zoroastrian tradition, and Gershevitch and others following Lommel consider the progression from "national" gods to demons to be attributable to the "genius of Zoroaster". Subsequent scholarship (so-called progressive hypothesis) has a more differentiated view of Zoroaster, and does not follow the unprovable assumption that prehistoric Iranian religion ever had "national" gods (and thus also that the divs could have represented such a group), nor does it involve hypothetical conjecture of whose gods the divs might/might not have been. While the progressive hypothesis gives Zoroaster credit for giving Iranian religion a moral and ethical dimension, it does not (with one notable exception) give Zoroaster credit for the development of the divs into demons. It assumes that the development was gradual, and that a general distrust of the divs already existed by the time the Gathas were composed.

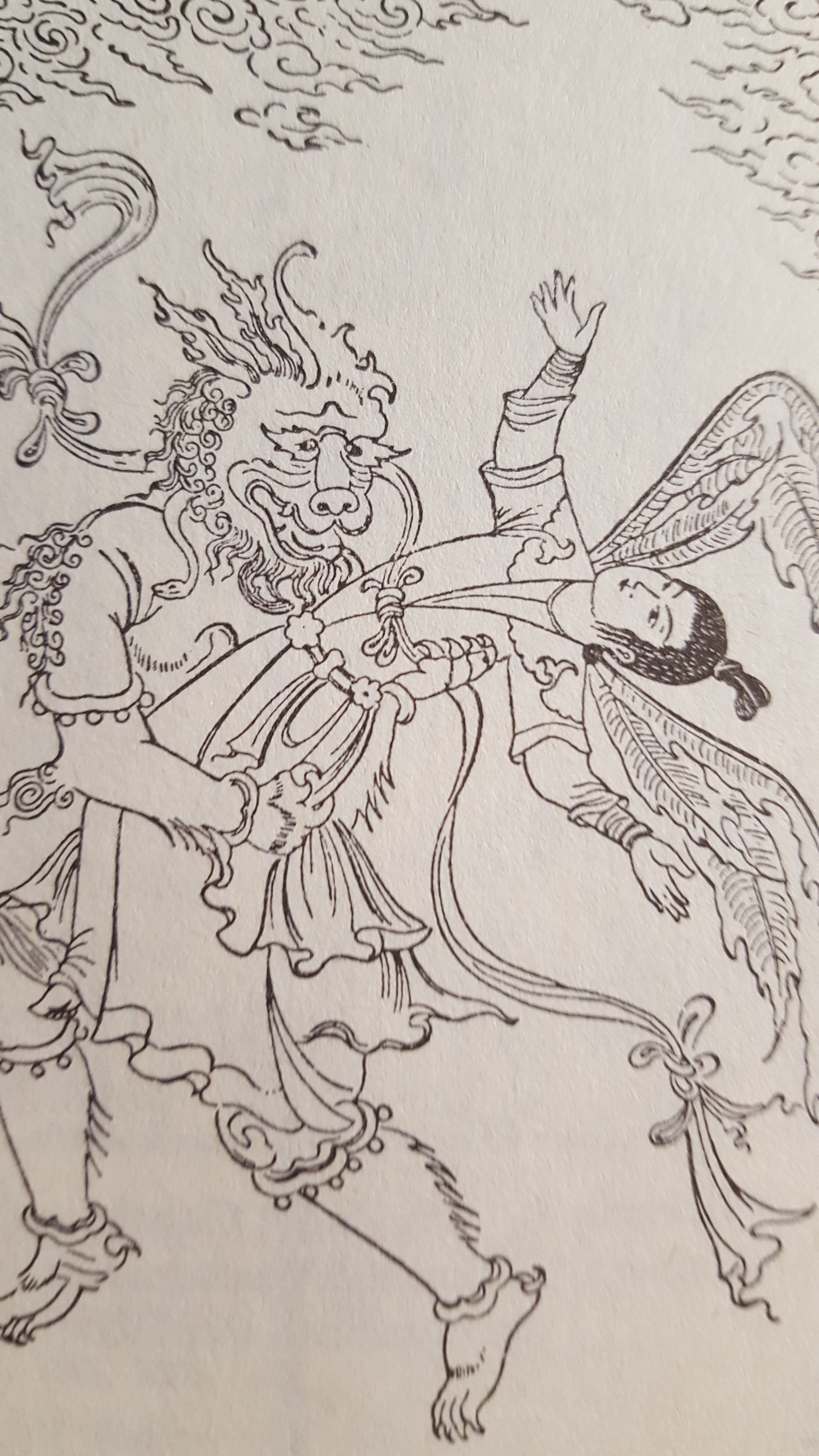
Div capturing a parī

In the Avesta, divs also appear as evil feminine spirits known as parī. The parī abide in the lower regions of the heavens beneath the sun, the moon, and the fixed stars, and may enchant men by their beauty and cause demonic possession. By the time of the Islamic conquest, the divs were considered to be fully demonic beings, where the parī however, became associated with beauty and were considered as a class separate from the divs. In early Persian translations of the Quran, jinn were translated as parī, while evil spirits, such as shayāṭīn, Iblīs, ʿifrīt, and ṭāġūt were translated as div. The story of the demon-king Sakhr, alluded to in the Qur'an in Surah Ṣād 38:34 also appears in the Babylonian Talmud, where a div called Asmodeus is the main antagonist of the prophet Solomon. The association of div with evil spirits is also evident from their mentioning in Aramaic incantation bowls, such as shedim (demi-gods), ruḥot (spirits), mazzikin ("harmers"), and "satans" (accuser angels).

Although with some points of comparison such as shared etymology, Indic devá- is thematically different from Avestan daēva. While in the post-Rigvedic Indic texts the conflict between the two groups of devas and asuras is a primary theme, this is not a theme in either the Rigveda nor in the Iranian texts, and therefore cannot have been a feature of a common heritage. The use of Asura in the Rigveda is unsystematic and inconsistent and "it can hardly be said to confirm the existence of a category of gods opposed to the devas". Indeed, RigVedic Deva is variously applied to most gods, including many of the asuras. Likewise, at the oldest layer, Zoroastrianism's divs are originally also gods (albeit gods to be rejected), and it is only in the younger texts that the word evolved to refer to evil creatures. And the Zoroastrian ahuras (etymologically related to the Vedic asuras) are also only vaguely defined, and only three in number.

Moreover, the daemonization of the asuras in India and the daemonization of the divs in Iran both took place "so late that the associated terms cannot be considered a feature of Indo-Iranian religious dialectology". The view popularized by Nyberg, Jacques Duchesne-Guillemin, and Widengren of a prehistorical opposition of *asura/daiva involves "interminable and entirely conjectural discussions" on the status of various Indo-Iranian entities that in one culture are asuras/ahuras and in the other are devas/divs.

== In Zoroastrian scripture ==
=== Gathas ===
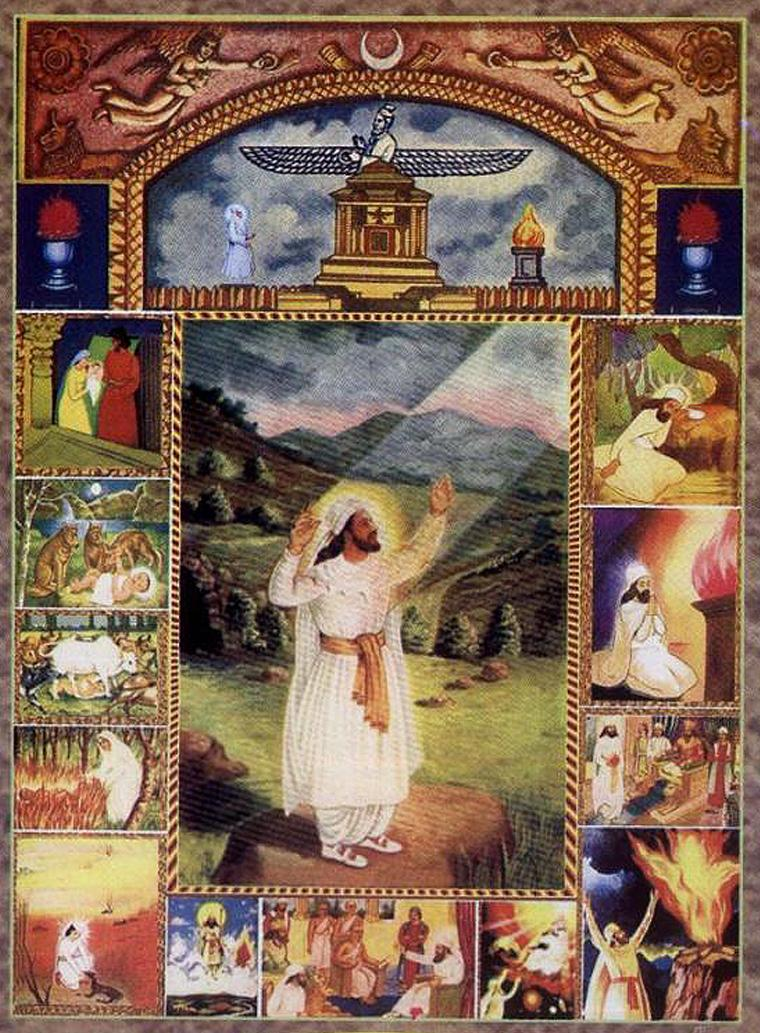
Painting depicting the life of Zoroaster

In the Gathas, the oldest texts of Zoroastrianism and credited to Zoroaster himself, the divs are not yet the demons that they would become in later Zoroastrianism; though their rejection is notable in the Gathas themselves. The Gathas speak of the divs as a group, and do not mention individual divs by name. In these ancient texts, the term divs (also spelled 'daēuuas') occurs 19 times; wherein divs are a distinct category of "quite genuine gods, who had, however, been rejected". In Yasna 32.3 and 46.1, the divs are still worshipped by the Iranian peoples. Yasna 32.8 notes that some of the followers of Zoroaster had previously been followers of the divs; though, the divs are clearly identified with evil (e.g., Yasna 32.5).

In the Gathas, divs are censured as being incapable of discerning truth (asha-) from falsehood (druj-). They are consequently in "error" (aēnah-), but are never identified as drəguuaṇt- "people of the lie". The conclusion drawn from such ambiguity is that, at the time the Gathas were composed, "the process of rejection, negation, or daemonization of these gods was only just beginning, but, as the evidence is full of gaps and ambiguities, this impression may be erroneous".

In Yasna 32.4, the divs are revered by the Usij, described as a class of "false priests", devoid of goodness of mind and heart, and hostile to cattle and husbandry (Yasna 32.10–11, 44.20). Like the divs that they follow, "the Usij are known throughout the seventh region of the earth as the offspring of aka mainyu, druj, and arrogance. (Yasna 32.3)". Yasna 30.6 suggests the div-worshipping priests debated frequently with Zoroaster, but failed to persuade him.

=== Younger Avesta ===
In the Younger Avesta, the divs are unambiguously hostile entities. In contrast, the word daevayasna- (literally, "one who sacrifices to divs") denotes adherents of other religions and thus still preserves some semblance of the original meaning in that the div- prefix still denotes "other" gods. In Yasht 5.94 however, the daevayasna- are those who sacrifice to Anahita during the hours of darkness, i.e., the hours when the divs lurk about, and daevayasna- appears then to be an epithet applied to those who deviate from accepted practice and/or harvested religious disapproval. The Vendidad, a contraction of vi-daevo-dāta, "given against the divs", is a collection of late Avestan texts that deals almost exclusively with the divs, or rather, their various manifestations and with ways to confound them. Vi.daeva- "rejecting the divs" qualifies the faithful Zoroastrian with the same force as mazdayasna- ('Mazda worshiper').

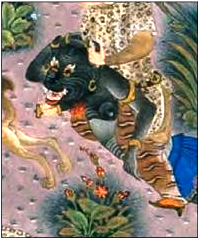
Siyah Div (The Shahnameh of Shah Tahmasp)

In Vendidad 10.9 and 19.43, three divinities of the Vedic pantheon follow Ahriman in a list of demons: Completely adapted to Iranian phonology, these are Indra (Vedic Indra), Sarva (Vedic Sarva, i.e. Rudra), and Nanghaithya (Vedic Nasatya). The process by which these three came to appear in the Avesta is uncertain. Together with three other divs, Tauru, Zairi and Nasu, that do not have Vedic equivalents, the six oppose the six Amesha Spentas. Vendidad 19.1 and 19.44 have Ahriman dwelling in the region of the divs which the Vendidad sets in the north and/or the nether world (Vendidad 19.47, Yasht 15.43), a world of darkness. In Vendidad 19.1 and 19.43–44, Ahriman is the daevanam daevo, "div of divs" or chief of the divs. The superlative daevo.taema is however assigned to the demon Paitisha ("opponent"). In an enumeration of the divs in Vendidad 1.43, Ahriman appears first and Paitisha appears last. "Nowhere is Ahriman said to be the creator of the divs or their father." The Vendidad is usually recited after nightfall since the last part of the day is considered to be the time of the demons. Because the Vendidad is the means to disable them, this text is said to be effective only when recited between sunset and sunrise.

=== Middle Persian texts ===
In the Middle Persian texts of Zoroastrian tradition, the divs are invariably rendered with the Aramaic ideogram ŠDYA or the more common plural ŠDYAʼn that signified "demons" even in the singular. Divs play a crucial role in the cosmogonic drama of the Bundahishn, a Zoroastrian view of creation completed in the 12th century. In this text, the evil spirit Ahriman (the middle Persian equivalent of Avestan Ahriman) creates his hordes of divs to counter the creation of Ohrmazd (Avestan Ahura Mazda). This notion is already alluded to in the Vendidad (see Younger Avestan texts above), but only properly developed in the Bundahishn. In particular, Ahriman is seen to create six divs that in Zoroastrian tradition are the antitheses of the Amahraspands (Avestan Amesha Spentas).

Fath'Ali Shah Qajar depicted slaying divs

Mirroring the task of the Amesha Spentas through which Ahura Mazda realized creation, the six antitheses are the instrument through which Ahriman creates all the horrors in the world. Further, the arch-divs of Vendidad 10.9 and 19.43 are identified as the antithetical counterparts of the Amesha Spentas. The six arch-demons as listed in the Epistles of Zadspram (WZ 35.37) and the Greater Bundahishn (GBd. 34.27) are:

- Akoman of "evil thought" opposing Wahman/Bahman of "good thought" (Av. Aka Manah versus Vohu Manah)
- Indar that freezes the minds of the righteous opposing Ardawahisht of "best truth" (Av. Iṇdra versus Asha Vahishta).
- Nanghait of discontent opposing Spendarmad of "holy devotion" (Av. Nanghaithya/Naonghaithya versus Spenta Armaiti)
- Sawar/Sarvar of oppression opposing Shahrewar of "desirable dominion" (Av. Saurva versus Kshathra Vairya)
- Tauriz/Tawrich of destruction opposing Hordad of "wholeness" (Av. Taurvi versus Haurvatat)
- Zariz/Zarich who poisons plants opposing Amurdad of "immortality" (Av. Zauri versus Ameretat)

These oppositions differ from those found in scripture, where the moral principles (that each Amesha Spenta represents) are opposed by immoral principles. This is not however a complete breach, for while in the Gathas asha—the principle—is the diametric opposite of the abstract druj, in Zoroastrian tradition, it is Ardawahisht, the Amesha Spenta that is the hypostasis of asha, that is opposed to by Indar, who freezes the minds of creatures from practicing "righteousness" (asha). Greater Bundahishn 34.27 adds two more arch-demons, which are not however in opposition to Amesha Spentas:

- Xeshm of "wrath" opposing Srosh of "obedience" (Av. Aeshma versus Sraosha)
- Gannag menog, the "foul death" or "stinking spirit", opposing Hormazd (Gannag menog is unknown in the Avesta, and Hormazd is Ahura Mazda).

A Shahnameh depiction of Divs in battle

Also mirroring Ohrmazd's act of creation, i.e., the realization of the Amesha Spentas by his "thought", is Ahriman's creation of the divs through his "demonic essence". Other texts describe this event as being to Ahriman's detriment for his act of "creation" is actually an act of destruction. Ahriman is the very epitome (and hypostasis) of destruction, and hence he did not "create" the demons, he realized them through destruction, and they then became that destruction. The consequence is that, as Ahriman and the divs can only destruct, they will ultimately destroy themselves (Denkard 3). As the medieval texts also do for Ahriman, they question whether the divs exist at all. Since "existence" is the domain of Ohrmazd, and Ahriman and his divs are anti-existence, it followed that Ahriman and his divs could not possibly exist. One interpretation of the Denkard proposes that the divs were perceived to be non-existent physically (that is, they were considered non-ontological) but present psychologically. (see also: Ahriman: In Zoroastrian tradition)

For a different set of texts, such as the Shayest ne shayest and the Book of Arda Wiraz, Ahriman and the divs were utterly real, and are described as being potentially catastrophic. In such less philosophical representations, the divs are hordes of devils with a range of individual powers ranging from the almost benign to the most malign. They collectively rush out at nightfall to do their worst, which includes every possible form of corruption at every possible level of human existence. Their destructiveness is evident not only in disease, pain, and grief but also in cosmic events such as falling stars and climatic events such as droughts, cyclones and earthquakes. They are sometimes described as having anthropomorphic properties such as faces and feet, or given animal-like properties such as claws and body hair. They may produce semen, and may even mate with humans as in the tale of Jam and Jamag (Bundahishn 14B.1).

But with the exception of the Book of Arda Wiraz, the divs are not generally described as a force to be feared. With fundamental optimism, the texts describe how the divs may be kept in check, ranging from cursing them to the active participation in life through good thoughts, words and deeds. Many of the medieval texts develop ideas already expressed in the Vendidad ("given against the demons").

A fire (cf. Adur) is an effective weapon against the divs, and keeping a hearth fire burning is a means to protect the home. The divs are "particularly attracted by the organic productions of human beings, from excretion, reproduction, sex, and death". Prayer and other recitations of the liturgy, in particular the recitation of Yasht 1 (so Sad-dar 57), is effective in keeping the demons at bay. Demons are attracted by chatter at mealtimes and when silence is broken a demon takes the place of the angel at one's side. According to Shayest-ne-Shayest 9.8, eating at all after nightfall is not advisable since the night is the time of demons. In the 9th century rivayats (65.14), the divs are described as issuing out at night to wreak mayhem, but forced back into the underworld by the divine glory (khvarenah) at sunrise.

=== List of Zoroastrian divs ===
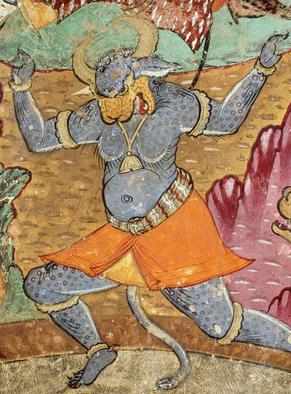
Akvan Div (The Shahnameh of Shah Tahmasp)

The Zoroastrianism of the medieval texts is unambiguous with respect to which force is the superior. Evil cannot create and is hence has a lower priority in the cosmic order (asha). According to Denkard 5.24.21a, the protection of the yazatas is ultimately greater than the power of the demons. The divs are agents ("procurers—vashikano—of success") of Ahriman (Avestan Ahriman) in the contests that will continue until the end of time, at which time the fiend will become invisible and (God's) creatures will become pure. (Dadestan-i Denig 59)

But until the final renovation of the world, mankind "stands between the yazads and the divs; the [yazads] are immortal in essence and inseparable from their bodies (mēnōg), men are immortal in essence but separable from their bodies (moving from gētīg to mēnōg condition), but divs are mortal in essence and inseparable from their bodies, which may be destroyed." In addition to the six arch-demons (see above) that oppose the six Amesha Spentas, numerous other figures appear in scripture and tradition. According to Bundahishn XXVII.12, the six arch-demons have cooperators (hamkars), arranged in a hierarchy (not further specified) similar to that of the yazatas. These are "divs [...] created by the sins that creatures commit." (Bundahishn XXVII.51)

- Akatash of perversion (e.g., Gbd XXVII)
- Anashtih "strife" (e.g., Chidag Andarz i Poryotkeshan 38)
- Anast that utters falsehood (e.g., Gbd XXVII)
- Apaush and Spenjaghra who cause drought (e.g., Gbd XXVII)
- Araska of vengeance (e.g., Gbd XXVII)
- Ashmogh of apostasy (Avestan Ashemaogha)
- Az of avarice and greed (e.g., Gbd XXVII)
- Buht of idolatry (e.g., Gbd XXVII)
- Bushasp of sloth (Avestan Bushyasta) (e.g., Gbd XXVII)
- Diwzhat (Av. Daebaaman), the deceiver, the hypocrite
- Eshm of wrath (Avestan Aeshma) (e.g., Gbd XXVII)
- Freptar of distraction and deception (e.g., Gbd XXVII)
- Jeh the whore (Avestan Jahi) (e.g., Gbd III)
- Mitokht (also Mithaokhta) of scepticism and falsehood (e.g. Gbd XXVII)
- Nang of disgrace and dishonor (e.g., Dadestan-i Denig 53)
- Nas or Nasa (Avestan Nasu) of pollution and contamination (e.g., GBd XXVII)
- Niyaz causes want (e.g., Gbd XXVII)
- Pinih of stinginess and who hoards but does not enjoy its hoard (e.g., Gbd XXVII)
- Rashk (Avestan Areshko) "envy" (e.g. Denkard 9.30.4)
- Sij who causes destruction (e.g., Gbd XXVII)
- Sitoj that denies doctrine (e.g., Dadestan-i Denig 53)
- Spazg of slander (e.g., Gbd XXVII)
- Spuzgar, the negligent (e.g., Andarz-i Khosru-i-Kavatan)
- Taromaiti of scorn (e.g., Gbd XXVII)
- Varun of unnatural lust (e.g., Gbd XXVII)

Other entities include:

- Aghash of the evil eye (e.g., Gbd XXVII)
- Astwihad of death (Avestan Asto-widhatu or Asto-vidatu) (e.g., Gbd XXVII)
- [Azi-/Az-]Dahak (Avestan Azi Dahaka), a serpent-like monster king. (e.g., J 4)
- Cheshma who opposes the clouds and causes earthquakes and whirlwinds (e.g., Gbd XXVII)
- Kunda, the steed that carries sorcerers (e.g., Gbd XXVII)
- Uta who brings about sickness through food and water (e.g., Gbd XXVII)
- Vizaresh that fights for the souls of the dead (e.g., Gbd XXVII)

The most destructive of these are Astiwihad, the demon of death that casts the noose of mortality around men's necks at birth, and Az, who is most capable of destroying the "innate wisdom" of man. Az is thus the cause of heresy and blinds the righteous man from being able to discern the truth and falsehood.

== In the Shahnameh ==
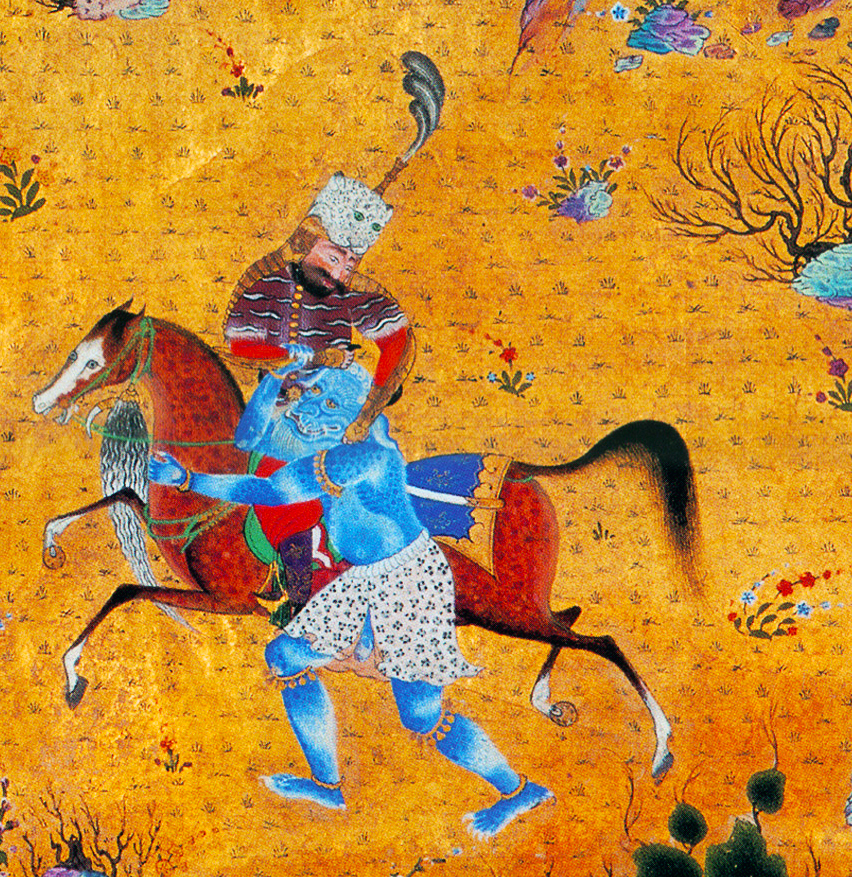
Rostam kills Arzhang Div (The Shahnameh of Shah Tahmasp)

In the epic poem Shahnameh, written by the Persian poet Ferdowsi between c. 977 and 1010 CE, the div had become associated with the lands of Mazandaran of legend (which is not to be identified with the Iranian province of Mazandaran). It has thus been speculated that the term div referred to generally evil characters, including both demonic beings as well as evil humans. A list of ten demons is provided in the Shahnameh: Besides the afore-mentioned Az "greed", Khashm "wrath" (Avestan Aeshma), Nang "dishonor", Niaz "want", and Rashk "envy", the epic poem includes Kin "vengeance", Nammam "tell-tale", Do-ruy "two-face", napak-din "heresy", and (not explicitly named) ungratefulness.

While some div appear as supernatural sorcerers, many div appear to be clearly demonized humans attributed with supernatural strength, but no supernatural bodily features. Some people continued to worship div in their rituals during the early Islamic period, known as "Daevayasna", although probably out of fear. People of Mazdaran might have been associated with such worship and therefore equated with these entities. Despite many div that appear human in nature, there are also clearly supernatural div, like the white div, who is said to be as huge as a mountain.

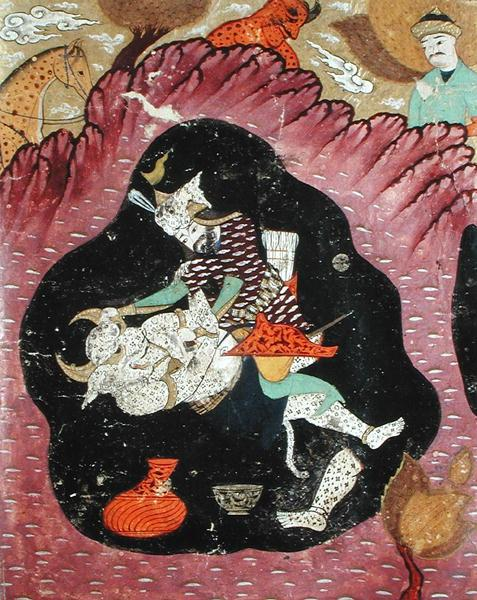
Rostam dismembering the Div-e Sepid, demon king of Mazandaran

The poem begins with the kings of the Pishdadian dynasty. They defeat and subjugate the divs. Tahmuras commanded the divs and became known as dīvband (binder of demons). Jamshid, the fourth king of the world, ruled over both paris and divs, and served as a high priest of Ohrmazd. Like his father, he slayed many divs, however, spared some under the condition they teach him new valuable arts, such as writing in different languages. After a just reign over hundreds of years, Jamshid grew haughty and claimed, because of his wealth and power, divinity for himself. Whereupon God withdraws his blessings from him, and his people get unsatisfied with their king. With the ceasing influence of God, the devil gains power and aids Zahhak to usurp the throne. Jamshid dies sawn in two by two divs. Tricked by Ahriman (or Iblis), Zahhak grew two snakes on his shoulders and becomes the demonic serpent-king. The King Kay Kāvus fails to conquer the legendary Mazandaran, the land of divs and gets captured. To save his king, Rostam takes a journey and fights through seven trials. Divs are among the common enemies Rustam faces, culminating in a duel with Div-e Sepid (the white div), who is king of the demons.

Rostam's battle against the demonic may also have a symbolic meaning: Rostam represents wisdom and rationality, fights the demon, embodiment of passion and instinct. Rostam's victory over the White Div is also a triumph over men's lower drives, and killing the div is a way to purge the human soul from such evil inclinations. The killing of the White Div is an inevitable act to restore the human king's eyesight. Eliminating the divs is an act of self-preservation to safeguard the good in oneself's, and the part acceptable in a regulated society.

== In folklore ==
According to folklore, divs are characterized through their inverted nature. They tend to do the opposite of what has been told to them. They are active at night, but get sleepy at day. Darkness is said to increase their power. Usually, the approach of a div is presaged by a change in temperature or foul smell in the air. They are capable of transformation and performing magic. They are said to capture maidens, trying to force them to marry the div. Some have the form of a snake or a dragon with multiple heads, whose heads grow again, after slain, comparable to the Hydra.

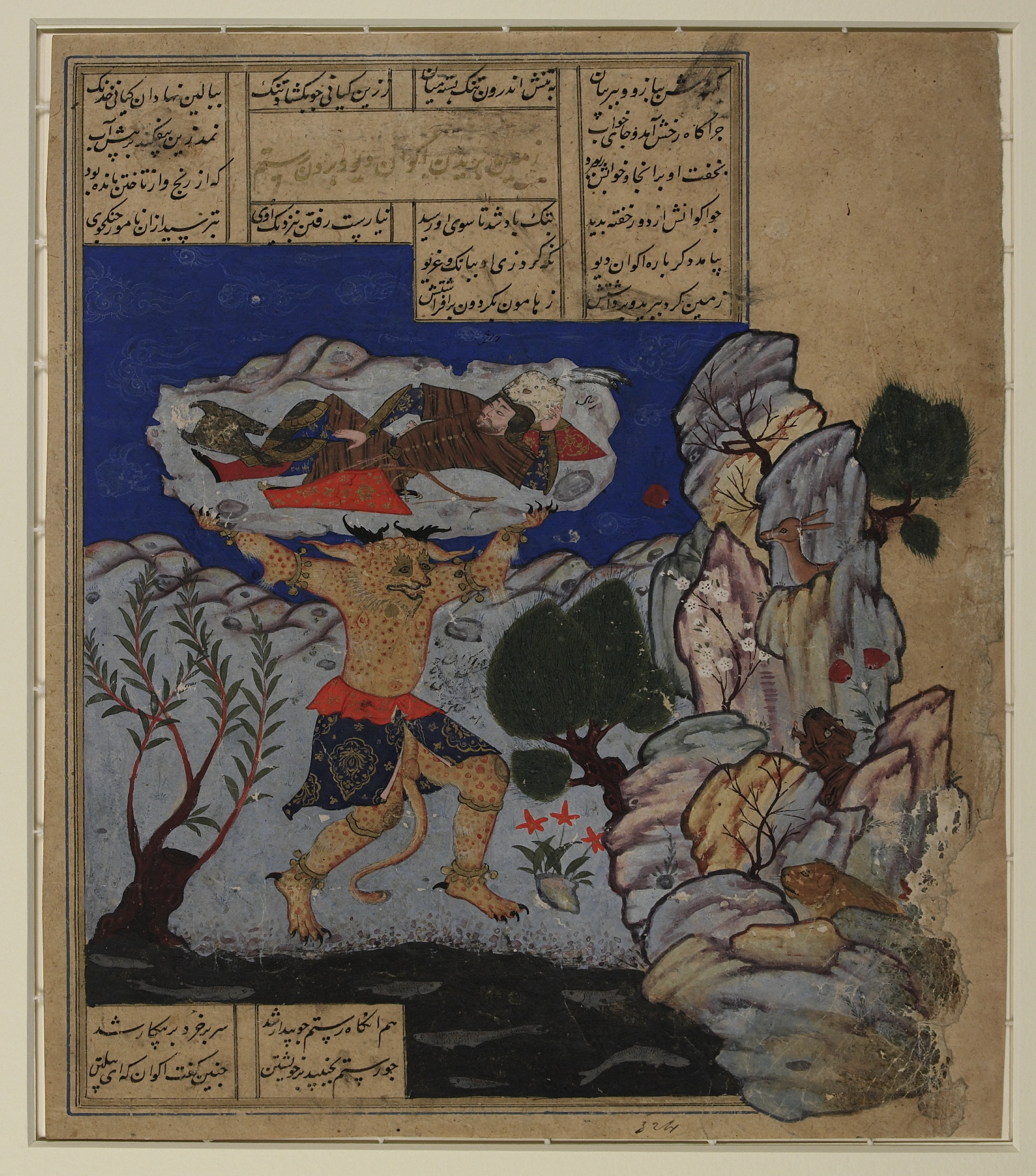
The Div Akvan throws Rostam into the sea. Miniature from the manuscript of the Shahnameh, 16th–17th century

Throughout many legends divs appear as villains, sorcerers, monsters, ogres, or even helpers of the protagonist. It is usually necessary to overcome the div to get his aid. After defeating the div, one must attach a horseshoe, a needle or an iron ring on his body to enslave them. A div can not be killed by physical combat, even if their body parts are cut off. Instead, one is required to find the object storing the soul of the div: After that object is destroyed, the div is said to disappear in smoke or thin air. The notion of a demon tied to a physical object, later inspired the European genie.

In Armenian mythology and many various Armenian folk tales, the dev (in Armenian: դև) appears both in a kind and specially in a malicious role, and has a semi-divine origin. In one medieval Armenian lexicon, the dev are explained as rebellious angels. Dev is a very large being with an immense head on his shoulders, and with eyes as large as earthen bowls. Some of them may have only one eye. Usually, there are black and white devs. However, both of them can either be malicious or kind. The White Dev is present in Hovhannes Tumanyan's tale "Yedemakan Tzaghike" (Arm.: Եդեմական Ծաղիկը), translated as "The Flower of Paradise". In the tale, the Dev is the flower's guardian. Jushkaparik, Vushkaparik, or Ass-Pairika is another chimerical being whose name indicates a half-demoniac and half-animal being, or a Pairika—a female Dev with amorous propensities—that appeared in the form of an ass and lived in ruins.

The divs are in constant battle with benevolent peris (fairies). While the divs are usually perceived as male, the peris are often, but not necessarily, depicted as female. According to a story, a man saved a white snake from a black one. The snake later revealed that she was a peri, and the black snake a div, who attacked her. The divs in turn, frequently try to capture the peris and imprison them in cages. In his treatise about the supernatural Ahl-i Hava (people of the air), Ghulam Husayn Sa'idi discusses several folkloric beliefs about different types of supernatural creatures and demons. He describes the Div as tall creatures living far away either on islands or in the desert. With their magical powers, they could turn people into statues by touching them.

== Syncretism with Islam ==
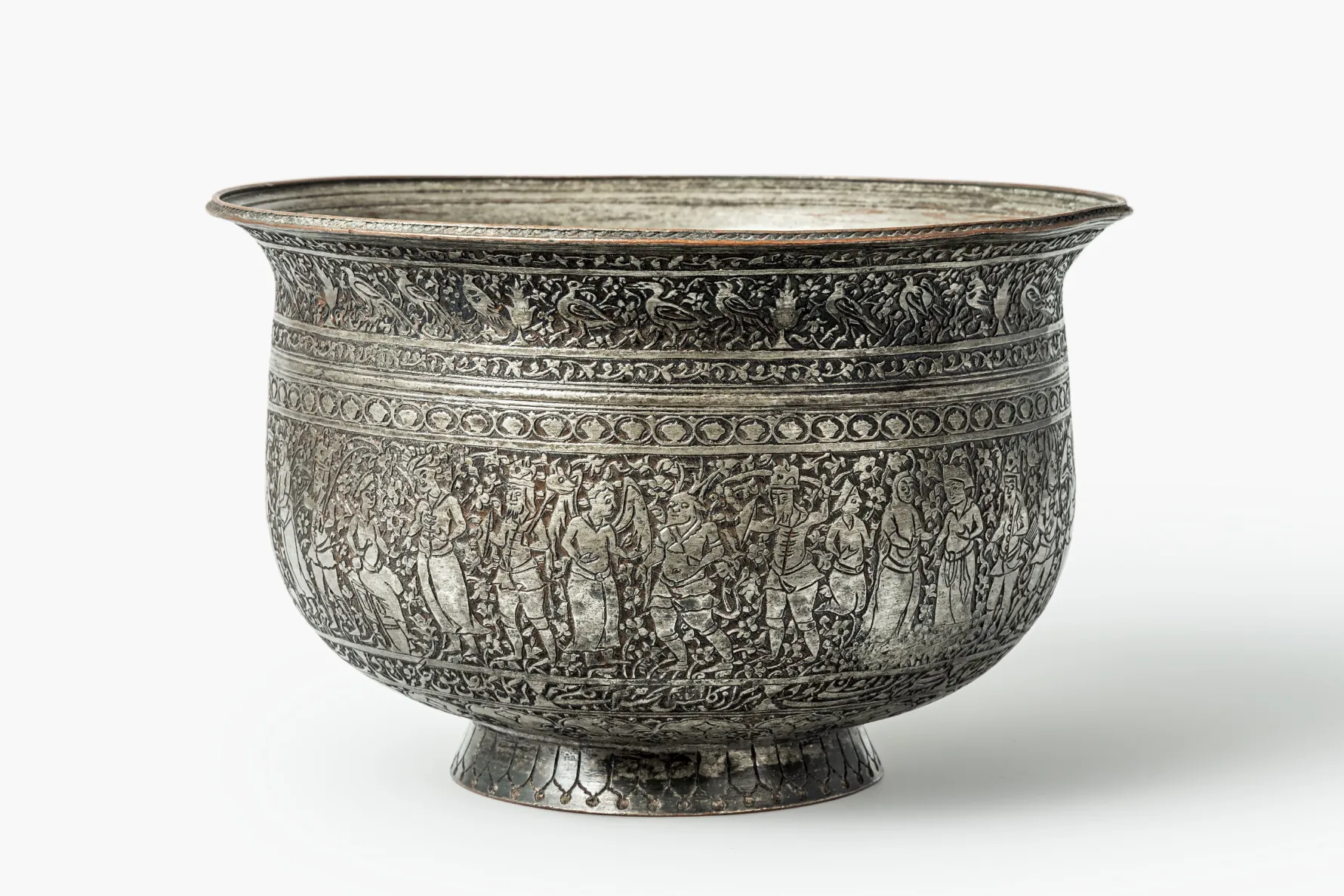
Bowl with humans, angels, and divs (demons). Iran Qajar dynasty, 1215–1221 A.H. (1800–1805). Museum für Kunst und Gewerbe Hamburg, Germany. This bowl depicts humans, angels, and horned creatures called divs - demons of ancient Iranian origin. Divs embody evil, disrupt order and represent vices such as pride and anger. They still appear in literature and art today as symbols of chaos and inner conflict.

Muslims adopted the concept of an evil spirit and integrated it into their Qur'anic worldview. According to modern Shias, divs will be judged by God and receive either reward or punishment, as do jinn and humans. Abu Ali Bal'ami's redition of Tarikh al-Tabari states that the divs were created before humans and jinn. They were physical giants or titans of primordial times, but vanished after the great flood. The notion that the world has been inhabited by various beings prior to the creation of mankind is not unique to Bal'ami, but already attested in the Tafsīr al-Ṭabarī and attributed to the companions of the prophet (Sahaba).

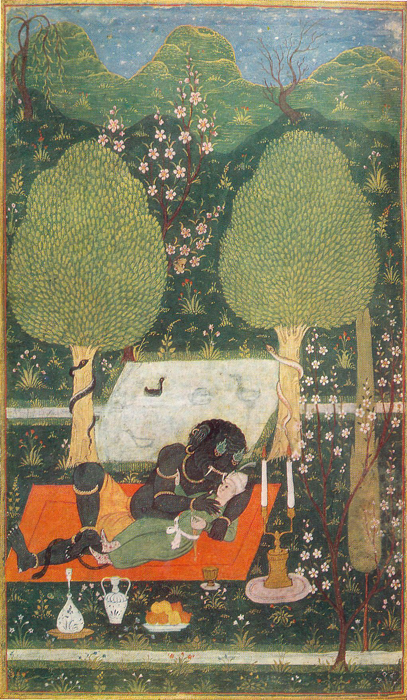
Māhān embraced by a div. Illustration to Nizami Ganjavi's poem Hamsa. Bukhara, 1648.

Thus, the divs occupy a place associated with the demonic in Islamic hagiography. As such, the divs were reimagined as various evil spirits already mentioned in Islamic scripture, such as shayṭān,ʿifrīt, and ṭāġūt. In Islamic Persian literature demons are not referred to by their Arabic names only but frequently explicitly called div. Rumi relates the very existence of the divs to the problem of evil and explains that the presence of divs proves God's omnipotence, for a powerful artist is able to not only create goodness but also the ugly and reprehensible. The Persian poet Sanai describes the material world as a valley inhabited by divs, who symbolize envy, greed, and malice prevailing on Earth. Due to their association with the material world and the demonic, the divs frequently appear throughout Persian adab literature for personifications of vices, which represent the al-nafs al-ammarah in orthodox Sufism. These teachings are then combined with Qur'anic teachings about the self and the escape from the dominion of the material world. Usually the Qur'anic story of the Prophet Solomon enslaving demons is viewed as the macrocosmic event of the microcosmis struggle of the spiritual self against the lower carnal desires of the div.

Attar of Nishapur writes: "If you bind the div, you will set out for the royal pavilion with Solomon" and "You have no command over your self's kingdom [body and mind], for in your case the div is in the place of Solomon".

In the Haft Peykar by Nizami Ganjavi (c. 1141 – 1209), the fictional wayfarer Māhān (the "moonlike one") travels through a demon-infested desert and meets a beautiful parī (fairy) at an oasis. Overcome by lust and passion, he unlawfully engages with the girl, whereupon she turns into a dēw, formed from God's wrath. Māhān is saved by the crowing of the rooster at dawn, before the demon could end his life. The div is formed through the consequences of Māhān's moral transgression and thus, represents a moral guardian and device of temptation.

== Bibliography ==
- Boyce, Mary (1975), The History of Zoroastrianism, vol. 1, Leiden: Brill
- Dhalla, Maneckji Nusservanji (1938), History of Zoroastrianism, New York: OUP.
- Duchesne-Guillemin, Jacques (1982), "Ahriman", Encyclopaedia Iranica, vol. 1, New York: Routledge & Kegan Paul, pp. 670–673.
- Duchesne-Guillemin, Jacques (1953). Ormazd et Ahriman: l'aventure dualiste dans l'Antiquité. Paris: Pug.
- Gnoli, Gherardo (1993), "Daivadana", Encyclopaedia Iranica, vol. 6, Costa Mesa: Mazda, pp. 602–603.
- Gershevitch, Ilya (1975), "Die Sonne das Beste", in Hinnels, John R. (ed.), Mithraic Studies. Proceedings of the First International Congress of Mithraic Studies, vol. 1, Lantham: Manchester UP/Rowman and Littlefield, pp. 68–89.
- Herrenschmidt, Clarisse; Kellens, Jean (1993), "*Daiva", Encyclopaedia Iranica, vol. 6, Costa Mesa: Mazda, pp. 599–602.
- Kent, Roland G (1937), "The Daiva-Inscription of Xerxes", Language, 13 (4): 292–305, doi:10.2307/409334, JSTOR 409334.
- Lommel, Hermann (1930), Die Religion Zarathustras nach dem Awesta dargestellt, Tübingen: JC Mohr.
- Nyberg, Henrik Samuel (1938). Die Religionen des alten Iran (in German). O. Zeller (published 1966). ISBN 978-3-535-00269-5.
- Omidsalar, Mahmoud (1996), "Dīv", Encyclopedia Iranica, vol. 7, Costa Mesa: Mazda, archived from the original on 4 October 2007.
- Shaked, Saul (1967), "Notes on Ahreman, the Evil Spirit and His Creation", Studies in Mysticism and Religion, Jerusalem: Magnes, pp. 227–234.
- Stausberg, Michael (2002), Die Religion Zarathushtras, Vol. 1, Stuttgart: Kohlhammer Verlag.
- Stausberg, Michael (2004), Die Religion Zarathushtras, Vol. 3, Stuttgart: Kohlhammer Verlag.
- Widengren, Geo (1965), Die Religionen Irans, Die Religion der Menschheit, Vol. 14, Stuttgart: Kohlhammer Verlag.
- Widengren, Geo (January 1954). "Stand und Aufgaben der iranischen Religionsgeschichte". Numen. 1 (1): 16–83. doi:10.2307/3269365. JSTOR 3269365.
- Williams, Alan V (1989), "The Body and the Boundaries of Zoroastrian Spirituality", Religion, 19 (3): 227–239, doi:10.1016/0048-721X(89)90022-5.
- Williams, Alan V (1996), "Dēw", Encyclopaedia Iranica, vol. 7, Costa Mesa: Mazda, pp. 333–334.
