= Frashokereti =

Zoroastrian doctrine of a final renovation of the universe

Frashokereti (Avestan: 𐬟𐬭𐬀𐬴𐬋⸱𐬐𐬆𐬭𐬆𐬙𐬌 frašō.kərəti) is the Avestan language term (corresponding to Middle Persian 𐭯𐭫𐭱(𐭠)𐭪𐭥𐭲 fraš(a)gird <plškrt>) for the Zoroastrian doctrine of a final renovation of the universe, when evil will be destroyed, and everything else will be then in perfect unity with God (Ahura Mazda).

The doctrinal premises are (1) good will eventually prevail over evil; (2) creation was initially perfectly good, but was subsequently corrupted by evil; (3) the world will ultimately be restored to the perfection it had at the time of creation; (4) the "salvation for the individual depended on the sum of [that person's] thoughts, words and deeds, and there could be no intervention, whether compassionate or capricious, by any divine being to alter this." Thus, each human bears the responsibility for the fate of his own soul, and simultaneously shares in the responsibility for the fate of the world.

== Etymology and meaning ==
The name suggests "making wonderful, excellent". (Note: The second part kərəti in Avestan means "making" (kardan in New Persian), but the meaning of the adjective fraša- is not certain; it probably indicates, and is usually translated as, "wonderful, excellent".) D. N. MacKenzie in A Concise Dictionary of Pahlavi gives the meaning as "the Restoration (at the end of time)". Considering this meaning, the first part could indicate "early, first, initial", related to fra prefix, cognate with pro in Greek and Latin. Then the overall meaning being "making into initial state", hence "restoration".

== Eschatology ==
The eschatological ideas are only alluded to in the surviving texts of the Avesta, and are known of in detail only from the texts of Zoroastrian tradition, in particular in the ca. 9th-century Bundahishn. The accompanying story, as it appears in the Bundahishn (GBd 30.1ff), runs as follows: At the end of the "third time" (the first being the age of creation, the second of mixture, and the third of separation), there will be a great battle between the forces of good (the yazatas) and those of evil (the daevas) in which the good will triumph. On earth, the Saoshyant will bring about a resurrection of the dead in the bodies they had before they died. This is followed by a last judgment through ordeal. The yazatas Airyaman and Atar will melt the metal in the hills and mountains, and the molten metal will then flow across the earth like a river. All mankind—both the living and the resurrected dead—will be required to wade through that river, but for the righteous (ashavan) it will seem to be a river of warm milk, while the wicked will be burned. The river will then flow down to hell, where it will annihilate Angra Mainyu and the last vestiges of wickedness in the universe. In later Zoroastrian texts, it is written that the molten metal will purify the wicked.

The narrative continues with a projection of Ahura Mazda and the six Amesha Spentas solemnizing a final act of worship (yasna), and the preparation of parahaoma from "white haoma". The righteous will partake of the parahaoma, which will confer immortality upon them. Thereafter, humankind will become like the Amesha Spentas, living without food, without hunger or thirst, and without weapons (or possibility of bodily injury). The material substance of the bodies will be so light as to cast no shadow. All humanity will speak a single language and belong to a single nation without borders. All will share a single purpose and goal, joining with the divine for a perpetual exaltation of God's glory.

Although frashokereti is a restoration of the time of creation, there is no return to the uniqueness of the primordial plant, animal and human; while in the beginning there was one plant, one animal and one human, the variety that had since issued would remain forever. Similarly, the host of divinities brought into existence by Mazda continue to have distinct existences, "and there is no prophecy of their re-absorption into the Godhead."

== See also ==
- Apocatastasis
- Kali Yuga
- Millenarianism
- Tikkun olam
- Ragnarök
