= Aesma =

Aesma may refer to:

- Aeshma, the Younger Avestan name of the demon of wrath in Zoroastrianism
- Aesma Daeva (band)
