= Siyah Div =

Character of Shahnameh of Persian mythology

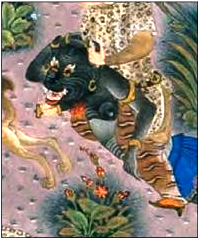
- Illustration of the Black Div from the Shahnameh (Book of Kings) by Abu'l-Qasim Manur Firdawsi (c.934-c.1020)

Creature information
- Grouping: Mythical creature
- Folklore: Persian mythology

Origin
- Country: Ancient Iran

Siyah Div (Persian: دیو سیاه) is a character in the Shahnameh of Shah Tahmasp; he is a mythical demon or Div.

In the Shahnameh, the epic poem written by the Persian poet Ferdowsi between c. 977 and 1010 CE, the div had become associated with the lands of Mazandaran of legend.
