= Akvan Div =

Persian creature of myth

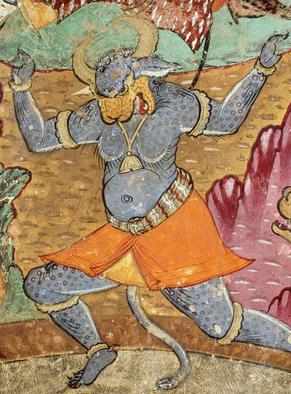
- Illustration of the Akvan Div from the Shahnameh (Book of Kings) by Abu'l-Qasim Manur Firdawsi (c.934-c.1020)

Creature information
- Grouping: Mythical creature
- Folklore: Persian mythology

Origin
- Country: Ancient Iran

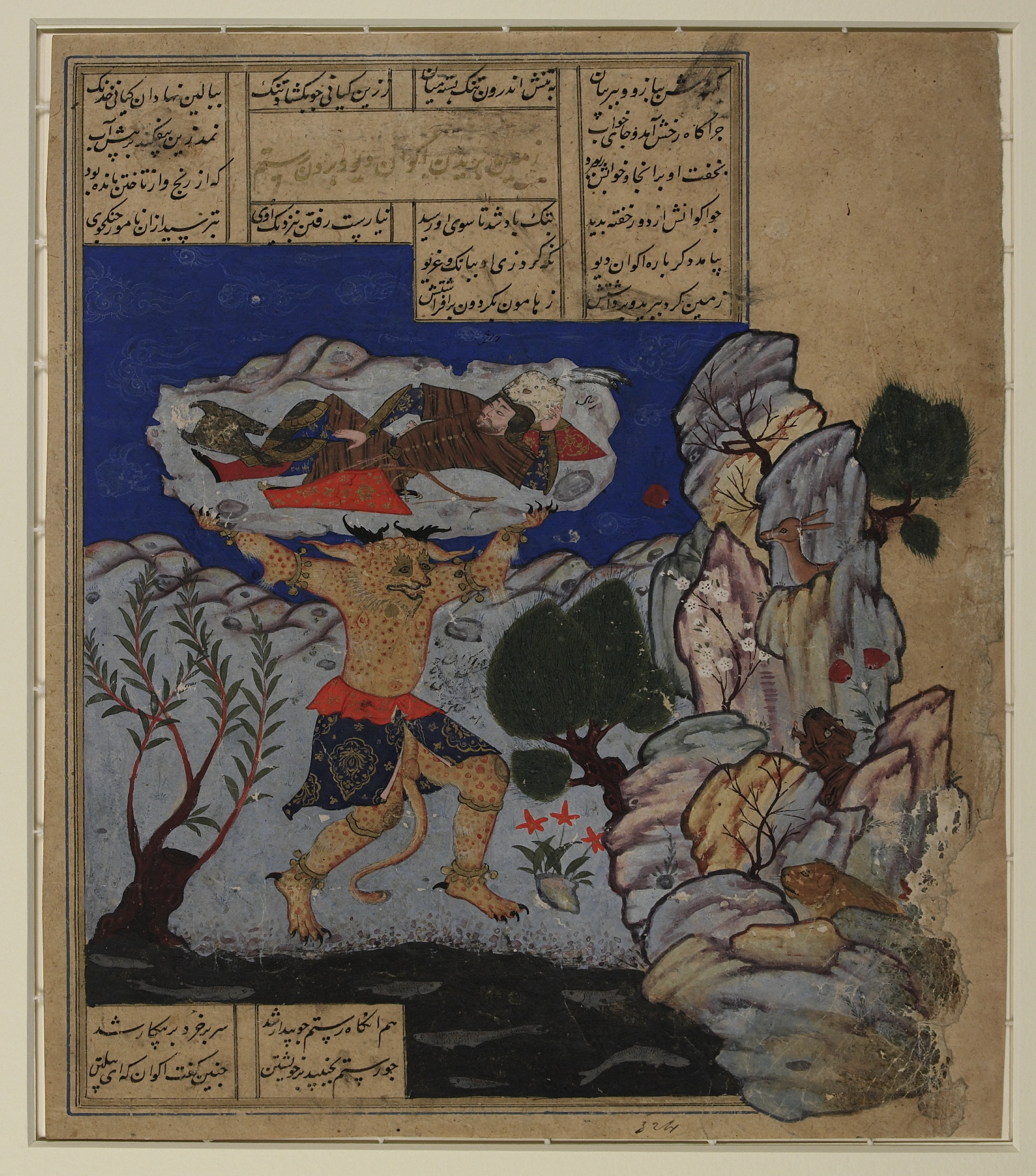
The Div Akvan throws Rostam into the sea. Miniature from the manuscript of the Shahnameh, 16th-17th century. Library of Congress

Akvan Div (Persian: اکوان دیو) is a mythical creature who appears in the role of Div. The subject of the story goes back to the time of Kay Khosrow. He can either disappear from view or become an onager or become a storm. In this story Akvan Div is in the onager herds with a brilliant body.

== The emergence of Akvan Div ==
Akvan Div emerges after a long period of war with the Turks. Kay Khosrow King of Iran has completed the Great War with Kamus Kashani. And all of his troops are at rest.

One day Shepherd Kayi Khosrow came to the Palace and complained that an onager had fled from the herd like a lion. The color of the body, like the glowing sun, a black line from its edge to its tail. It is like a big horse with four strong hands and feet. Kay Khosrow realizes he is not an onager but a demon. All the warriors were present. Then Kikhosro ordered Rustam to destroy that particular div.

Akvan Divi could become wind or disguise himself. When Rostam reached the plain, he waited three days and on the fourth day he saw onager herds fleeing. But among the bright onager flock, she was escaping to find that she was the demon. Rostam the rope out to catch him, but Akvan disappeared. Rostam now knew that he would not have a good fight with him. He tried to kill Akvan several times, but he disappeared every time until Rostam became tired and needed sleep and rest. After the hero fell asleep, Akvān, approached him and, cutting away the earth around him, lifted him up to the sky. He then asked Rostam whether he should throw him upon a mountain or into the sea. Rostam preferred the sea but, realizing that the dīv's mind was perverse, asked to be thrown onto the mountain. As Rostam surmised, the dīv threw him into the sea. After saving himself, Rostam again confronted Akvān and managed to snare him with his lasso, then beheaded him.

== The story of Rostam after killing Akvan ==
Rostam returned to his sleeping spring but did not find Rakhsh. He set out on foot and reached a farm. There he found his horse with a herd of Afrasiab horses, then mounted the horse and took the herd of Afrasiab horses with him. Rostam was attacked by the Afrasiab Corps at the end of work and fought with all of the Turanian soldiers one trunk. He killed more than a hundred people in the battle.

== Sources ==
- Ferdowsi Shahnameh. From the Moscow version. Mohammed Publishing. ISBN 964-5566-35-5
