= Jes Peter Asmussen =

Danish Iranologist (1928–2002)

Jes Peter Asmussen (2 November 1928 – 5 August 2002) was a Danish Iranologist.

Asmussen was born and raised in Aabenraa. He studied theology and the Greenlandic language at the University of Copenhagen and earned his candidatus theologiæ degree in 1954. He then studied Iranistics in Cambridge, London, Hamburg, and Tehran, and earned his doctorate in 1965 at the University of Copenhagen. He was associated with the university throughout his academic career, becoming associate professor in 1966 and full professor in 1967, succeeding professor Kaj Barr. He retired in 1998.

Asmussen's research focused on the religions of Iran. He was mostly interested in Manicheism, but also wrote about Zoroastrianism, Islam and Christianity in ancient Iran, as well as the Judeo-Persian language and literature. He is counted among the central figures of the Danish Orientalist scholarship.

He was elected member of the Royal Danish Academy of Sciences and Letters in 1973 and corresponding member of Saxon Academy of Sciences in 1982. He was appointed a Knight of the Order of the Dannebrog in 1976 and received an honorary doctorate from Lund University in 1986.

Asmussen died in 2002 and is interred at the Cemetery of Holmen in Copenhagen.
