= Vohu Manah =

Zoroastrian concept

- Good Thought
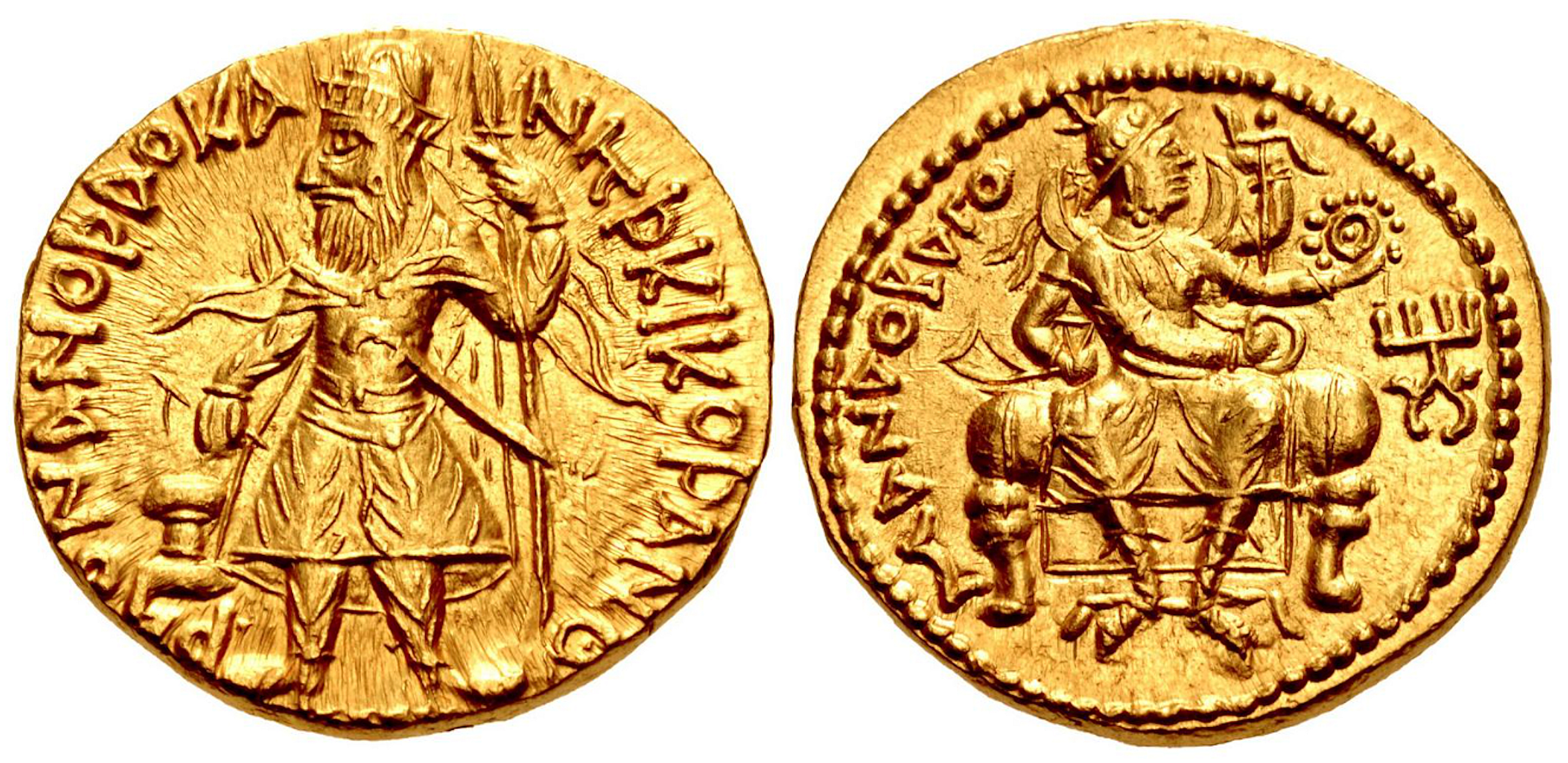
- Kushan ruler Kanishka I with Manaobago (Vohu Manah).
- Other names: Vohman, Bahman, Vohu Mino, Vahishta Mino
- Avestan: Vohu Manah 𐬬𐬊𐬵𐬎 𐬨𐬀𐬥𐬀𐬵
- Affiliation: The Thirty-Three Deities، Guardians of the Days of the Month، The Twelve Deities، Amesha Spenta
- Symbol: Purity, wisdom, knowledge, good speech
- Sacred flower: Jasmine
- Attributes: Guardian of the cattle, the first creation of Ahuramazd, the most powerful force in the battle against the chaos of the universe.
- Enemy: Aka Manah
- Day: 2nd of each month in the Iranian calendar
- Gender: Male
- Festivals: Bahmanagān
- Associated deities: Drvaspa, Rama, Mah

Equivalents
- Abrahamic: Gabriel

Vohu Manah (Avestan: 𐬬𐬊𐬵𐬎 𐬨𐬀𐬥𐬀𐬵 vohu manah) is the Avestan language term for a Zoroastrian concept, generally translated as "Good Purpose", "Good Mind", or "Good Thought", referring to the good state of mind that enables an individual to accomplish their duties. Its Middle Persian equivalent, as attested in the Pahlavi script texts of Zoroastrian tradition, is 𐭥𐭤𐭥𐭬𐭭 Wahman, which is a borrowing of the Avestan language expression and has the same meaning, and which continues in New Persian as بهمن Bahman and variants. Manah is cognate with the Sanskrit word Manas suggesting some commonality between the ideas of the Gathas and those of the Rigveda. The opposite of Vohu Manah is akem manah or Aka Manah, "evil purpose" or "evil mind".

The term is a compound of the words vohu "good" and manah "mind, thought, purpose", cognate with the Vedic words vásu and mánas, both with the same meaning. Both of these derive from Proto-Indo-Iranian *Hwásuš and *mánas, in turn from Proto-Indo-European *h₁wésus and *ménos.

In the Gathas, the oldest texts of the Avesta and considered to be composed by Zoroaster, the term 'Vohu Manah' is not unambiguously used as a proper name and frequently occurs without the "Good" (Vohu-) prefix.

In the post-Gathic texts that expound the principles of Zoroastrian cosmogony, Vohu Manah is an Amesha Spenta, one of seven emanations of Ahura Mazda that each represent one facet of creation. In the case of Vohu Manah, it is the animal creation, in particular cattle. Vohu Manah is of neutral gender in Avestan grammar but in Zoroastrian tradition is considered masculine.

In the Zoroastrian calendar, the second day of each month as well as the eleventh month of each year are dedicated to Vohu Manah. In the Iranian civil calendar, which inherits the names of the months from the Zoroastrian calendar, the 11th month is likewise named Bahman.

The Achaemenid emperor Artaxerxes II (as it is rendered in Greek) had "Vohu Manah" as the second part of his throne name, which when "translated" into Greek appeared as "Mnemon". New Persian Bahman remains a theophoric in present-day Iranian and Zoroastrian tradition.

== See also ==
- Amesha Spentas, the emanations of Ahura Mazda in Zoroastrianism.
