= Ashavan =

Zoroastrian theological term

Ashavan (Avestan: 𐬀𐬴𐬀𐬬𐬀𐬥 ašavan) is a Zoroastrian theological term. It literally means "possessing/mastering aša" and has been interpreted as "possessing/mastering truth" or "possessing/mastering righteousness", but has further implications:

- It is an epithet of Ahura Mazda (Yasht 1.12). The term may then be applied to anything within the domain of Ahura Mazda and/or Aša (i.e. all of Creation), and excludes only that which is drəgvant "possessing lie" (YAv: drvant).
- With respect to mortals and in an eschatological and sotereological context, ašavan is also a quality that can be acquired in life. Then, having acquired the qualities of an ašavan, one becomes an ašavan (through "blessed union with aša") after death. (See also: aša: in eschatology and sotereology). This soteriological meaning of ašavan is also evident in Xerxes' daiva inscription, an Old Persian text (XPh, early 5th century BCE). This next-world meaning of ašavan is preserved in Middle Iranian languages as Pahlavi ahlav.
- Ašavan may be used to denote any follower of the "Good Religion." This is the most common use of ašavan, applicable to any who walk the "path of truth" (Yasna 68.12 and 68.13). In this context, Ašavan is frequently translated as "righteous person" or "blessed person." This general meaning of ašavan is preserved in Middle Iranian languages as Pahlavi ardav.

The linguistic cognate of Avestan ašavan is Vedic ऋतावन् ṛtā́van, which, however, has some functional differences vis-à-vis the Zoroastrian term:

- The dichotomy of the ašavan and the drəgvant is not attested in the Vedas.
- In Zoroastrianism any mortal may strive to possess aša, but in the Vedas, ṛtá is hidden from ordinary mortals and only initiated seers are allowed to possess it (become ṛtā́vans).

That the souls of the dead dwell in the radiant quarters of Asha (Yasna 16.7) has a Vedic parallel in which the seat of truth is located in the other world.
