= Yazata =

Zoroastrian divinities

Yazata (Avestan: 𐬫𐬀𐬰𐬀𐬙𐬀) is the Avestan word for a Zoroastrian concept with a wide range of meanings but generally signifying (or used as an epithet of) a divinity. The term literally means "worthy of worship or veneration", and is thus, in this more general sense, also applied to certain healing plants, primordial creatures, the fravashis of the dead, and to certain prayers that are themselves considered holy. The yazatas collectively are "the good powers under Ahura Mazda", who is "the greatest of the yazatas".

== Etymology ==
Yazata is an Avestan-language passive adjectival participle derived from yaz- ‘to worship, to honor, to venerate’, from Proto-Indo-European *h₁i̯eǵ- ‘to worship, revere, sacrifice’. The word yasna or yagna– "worship, sacrifice, oblation, prayer" – comes from the same root. A yaza+ ta is accordingly "a being worthy of worship", "an object of worship" or "a holy being".

As the stem form, yazata- has the inflected nominative forms yazatō (𐬫𐬀𐬰𐬀𐬙𐬋), pl. yazatåŋhō (𐬫𐬀𐬰𐬀𐬙𐬂𐬢𐬵𐬋). These forms reflect Proto-Iranian *yazatah and pl. *yazatāhah. In Middle Persian the term became yazad or yazd (𐭩𐭦𐭲𐭩), pl. yazdān, continuing in New Persian as ’êzaḏ (ایزد).

Related terms in other languages are Sanskrit yájati (यजति) "he worships, sacrifices", yajatá- (यजत) "worthy of worship, holy", yajñá (यज्ञ) ‘sacrifice’, and perhaps (Note: Pokorny's IEW considers Yazata-, yaz-, yasna, Sanskrit yájati and yajñá, and Greek hagios (ἅγιος) all to be reflexes of a PIE root *i̯agʲ- ~ i̯aǵ- ‘religiously venerate’, though some, partially derivative, authorities, such as Calvert Watkins’ The American Heritage Dictionary of Indo-European roots, give no indication that the Greek term is still considered to be related.) also Greek hagios (ἅγιος) "sacred, holy".

== In scripture ==
The term yazata is already used in the Gathas, the oldest texts of Zoroastrianism and believed to have been composed by Zarathustra himself. In these hymns, yazata is used as a generic, applied to Ahura Mazda as well as to the "divine sparks" that are in later tradition the Amesha Spentas. In the Gathas, the yazatas are effectively what the daevas are not; that is, the yazatas are to be worshipped while the daevas are to be rejected.

The Gathas also collectively invoke the yazatas without providing a clue as to which entities are being invoked, and—given the structure and language of the hymns—it is generally not possible to determine whether these yazatas are abstract concepts or are manifest entities. Amongst the lesser Yazatas being invoked by name by the poet of the Gathas are Sraosha, Ashi, Atar, Geush Tashan, Geush Urvan, Tushnamaiti, and Iza, and all of which "win mention in his hymns, it seems, because of their close association with rituals of sacrifice and worship".

In the Younger Avesta, the yazatas are unambiguously divine, with divine powers though performing mundane tasks such as serving as charioteers for other yazatas. Several yazatas are given anthropomorphic attributes, such as cradling a mace or bearing a crown upon their heads, or not letting sleep interrupt their vigil against the demons.

At some point during the late 5th or early 4th century BCE, the Achaemenids instituted a religious calendar in which each day of the month was named after, and placed under the protection of, a particular yazata. These day-name dedications were not only of religious significance because they ensured that those divinities remained in the public consciousness, they also established a hierarchy among the yazatas, with specific exalted entities having key positions in the day-name dedications (see Zoroastrian calendar for details).

Although these day-name dedications are mirrored in scripture, it cannot be determined whether these day-name assignments were provoked by an antecedent list in scripture (e.g. Yasna 16), or whether the day-name dedications provoked the compilation of such lists. Relatively certain however is that the day-name dedications predate the Avesta's Siroza ("30 days"), which contain explicit references to the yazatas as protectors/guardians of their respective days of the month.

== In tradition ==
The 9th–12th century texts of Zoroastrian tradition observe the yazatas (by then as Middle Persian yazads) in much the same way as the hymns of the Younger Avesta. In addition, in roles that are only alluded to in scripture, they assume characteristics of cosmological or eschatological consequence.

For instance, Aredvi Sura Anahita (Ardvisur Nahid) is both a divinity of the waters as well as a rushing world river that encircles the earth, which is blocked up by Angra Mainyu (Ahriman) thus causing drought. The blockage is removed by Verethragna (Vahram), and Tishtrya (Tir) gathers up the waters and spreads them over the earth (Zam) as rain. In stories with eschatological significance, Sraosha (Sarosh), Mithra (Mihr), and Rashnu (Rashn) are guardians of the Chinvat bridge, the bridge of the separator, across which all souls must pass.

Further, what the calendrical dedications had begun, the tradition completed: at the top of the hierarchy was Ahura Mazda, who was supported by the great heptad of Amesha Spentas (Ameshaspands/Mahraspands), through which the Creator realized ("created with his thought") the manifest universe. The Amesha Spentas in turn had hamkars, "assistants" or "cooperators", each a caretaker of one facet of creation.

In both tradition and scripture, the terms 'Amesha Spenta' and 'yazata' are sometimes used interchangeably. In general, however, 'Amesha Spenta' signifies the six divine emanations of Ahura Mazda. In tradition, yazata is the first of the 101 epithets of Ahura Mazda. The word also came to be applied to Zoroaster, though Zoroastrians today remain sharply critical of any attempts to deify the prophet. In a hierarchy excluding either Ahura Mazda or the Amesha Spentas amongst the yazatas, the most prominent amongst those "worthy of worship" is Mithra, who "is second only in dignity to Ohrmazd (i.e. Ahura Mazda) himself."

Outside of the traditional yazatas, local and foreign deities may have been incorporated into local religious practice in various distant territories of the Persian Empires. This features prominently in Zoroastrian worship in Armenia, the Kushan Empire, Sogdia, China, and other regions where Zoroastrianism was practiced outside of Iran.

== In the present day ==
In the 1860s and 1870s, the linguist Martin Haug interpreted Zoroastrian scripture in Christian terms, and compared the yazatas to the angels of Christianity. In this scheme, the Amesha Spentas are the arch-angel retinue of Ahura Mazda, with the hamkars as the supporting host of lesser angels.

At the time Haug wrote his translations, the Parsi (i.e. Indian Zoroastrian) community was under intense pressure from English and American missionaries, who severely criticized the Zoroastrians for—as John Wilson portrayed it in 1843—"polytheism", which the missionaries argued was much less worth than their own "monotheism". At the time, Zoroastrianism lacked theologians of its own, and so the Zoroastrians were poorly equipped to make their own case. In this situation, Haug's counter-interpretation came as a welcome relief, and was (by-and-large) gratefully accepted as legitimate.

Haug's interpretations were subsequently disseminated as Zoroastrian ones, which then eventually reached the west where they were seen to corroborate Haug. Like most of Haug's interpretations, this comparison is today so well entrenched that a gloss of 'yazata' as 'angel' is almost universally accepted; both in publications intended for a general audience as well as in (non-philological) academic literature.

Amongst the Muslims of Iran, Sraosha came to be "arguably the most popular of all the subordinate Yazatas", for as the angel Surush, only he (of the entire Zoroastrian pantheon) is still venerated by name.

== See also ==
- Uthra-Mandaean light beings that compare to Yazata
