= Amesha Spenta =

Class of divine entities in Zoroastrianism

In Zoroastrianism, the Amesha Spenta (Avestan: 𐬀𐬨𐬆𐬱𐬀 𐬯𐬞𐬆𐬧𐬙𐬀, romanized: Aməša Spəṇta—literally "Immortal (which is) holy/bounteous/furthering") are a class of seven divine entities emanating from Ahura Mazda, the highest divinity of the religion. (Note: The noun is amesha "immortal" from the negative prefix a + *mer (ProtoIndoEuropean: "death"), and the adjective spenta "furthering, strengthening, bounteous, holy" is its qualifier.) Later Middle Persian variations of the term include the contraction 'Ameshaspand' as well as the specifically Zoroastrian 'Mahraspand' and 'Amahraspand'.

== As divine entities ==
Significantly more common than the non-specific meaning of Amesha Spenta (see below) is a restrictive use of the term to refer to the great seven divine entities emanating from Ahura Mazda. In Zoroastrian tradition, these are the first seven emanations of the uncreated creator, through whom all subsequent creation was accomplished. This fundamental doctrine is only alluded to in the Avesta, but is systematically described in later Middle Persian language texts, in particular in the Bundahishn, an 11th or 12th century work that recounts Zoroastrian cosmology.

The expression Amesha Spenta does not occur in the Gathas, but "it was probably coined by Zoroaster himself. Spenta is a characteristic word of his revelation, meaning furthering, strengthening, bounteous, holy." The oldest attested use of the term is in part of the Yasna Haptanghaiti and in which the two elements of the name occur in reverse order, that is, as Spenta Amesha. Like all other verses of the Yasna Haptanghaiti, Yasna 39.3 is also in Gathic Avestan and is approximately as old as the hymns attributed to Zoroaster himself.

Amesha Spenta in the Gathas
Gathic name	Approximate meaning
Spəṇta Mainyu (𐬯𐬞𐬆𐬧𐬙𐬀 𐬨𐬀𐬌𐬥𐬌𐬌𐬎)	Holy/Creative Spirit/Mentality
[Vohu] Manah (𐬬𐬊𐬵𐬎 𐬨𐬀𐬥𐬀𐬵)	[Good] Purpose
Aṣ̌a [Vahišta] (𐬀𐬴𐬀 𐬬𐬀𐬵𐬌𐬱𐬙𐬀)	[Best] Truth / Righteousness
Xšaθra [Vairya] (𐬑𐬱𐬀𐬚𐬭𐬀 𐬬𐬀𐬌𐬭𐬌𐬌𐬀)	[Desirable] Dominion
[Spəṇta] Ārmaiti (𐬯𐬞𐬆𐬧𐬙𐬀 𐬁𐬭𐬨𐬀𐬌𐬙𐬌)	[Holy] Devotion
Haurvatāt (𐬵𐬀𐬎𐬭𐬬𐬀𐬙𐬁𐬙)	Wholeness
Amərətāt (𐬀𐬨𐬆𐬭𐬆𐬙𐬁𐬙)	Immortality

The attributes vohu "good", vahišta "best", vairya "desirable" and spenta "holy" are not always present in the oldest texts. If they appear at all, they do not necessarily appear immediately adjacent to the noun. (Note: This is also true for all other compounds, including [Ahura] Mazda; only in the Younger Avesta are these unambiguously identifiable as proper nouns.) But in later tradition, these adjectives are integral to the names themselves.

While Vohu Manah, Aša Vahišta, and Xšaθra Vairya are consistently of neuter gender in Avestan grammar; in tradition they are considered masculine. Armaiti, Haurvatāt, and Amərətāt are invariably feminine.

In the Gathas, each Amesha Spenta represents a good moral quality that mortals should strive to obtain. Thus, the doctrine of the great seven is that through good thoughts, words, and deeds, each individual should endeavor to assimilate the qualities of an Amesha Spenta into oneself.

Each of the seven has an antithetical counterpart, and five of the seven are already assigned one in the Gathas: aša/arta- (truth) is opposed to the druj- (deceit, lies), spəṇta-mainyu to angra-mainyu, vohu-manah is opposed to aka-manah-, xšaθra- to dušae-xšaθra-, and armaiti- to taraemaiti-. Not evident in the Gathas and first appearing in the Younger Avesta are the oppositions of haurvatāt- (wholeness) to taršna- (thirst), and amərətāt- (life) to šud- (hunger). These latter assignments reflect Haurvatat's identification with water and Ameretat's identification with plants.

In the Gathas, aša/arta is the most evident of the seven, and also the most commonly associated with wisdom (mazda-). In the 238 verses of these hymns, aša-/arta- appears 157 times. Of the other concepts, only vohumanah- appears nearly as often (136 occurrences). In comparison, the remaining four of the great sextet appear only 121 times altogether: xšaθra-: 56 times; armaiti-: 40; amərətāt-: 14; haurvatāt-: 11 times.

In the context of Zoroastrian cosmology, the group of the Amesha Spenta is extended to include Ahura Mazda, represented by (or together with) Spenta Mainyu, who is the instrument or "active principle" of the act of creation. It is also through this "Bounteous Force", "Creative Emanation", or "Holy Spirit" that Ahura Mazda is immanent in humankind, and how the Creator interacts with the world.

The doctrine also has a physical dimension, in that each of the heptad is linked to one of the seven creations, which in ancient philosophy were the foundation of the universe. A systematic association is only present in later Middle Persian texts, where each of the seven is listed with its "special domain":

Systematic associations in later Persian texts
Gathic name	Middle Persian	New Persian	Systematic association
Spəṇta Mainyu			of humans and guardian of all
Vohu Manah	Wahman	Bahman	of cattle (and all animals)
Aša Vahišta	Ardwahišt	Urdībihišt	of fire (and all other luminaries)
Xšaθra Vairya	Šahrewar	Šahrivar	of metals (and minerals)
Spənta Ārmaiti	Spandarmad	Esfand/Espand	of earth
Haurvatāt	Hordād	Xurdād	of water
Amərətāt	Amurdād	Murdād	of plants

In the Gathas, Xšaθra [Vairya] does not have an association with a specific creation, and it is only in later texts that this Amesha Spenta is considered the guardian of metals. This anomaly is explained in modern scholarship by the fact that, in Stone Age cosmogony, the sky was considered to be the first of the creations (and thought to be of stone), but metal has no place among the creations (the Bronze and Iron Ages were yet to come). This is also reflected in Zoroaster's revelation, where the sky is "of the hardest stone". Later, with the advent of bronze and then iron tools, this sky evolved to being of crystal, which was seen as both a stone and a metal. In due course, Xšaθra's association with a stony firmament was eclipsed by the association with a metallic sky, and thence to metals in general.

== In non-specific usage ==
In non-specific usage, the term Amesha Spenta denotes all the divinities that furthered or strengthened creation and all that are bounteous and holy. It not only includes the Ahuras (a term that in the Gathas is also used in the plural but only includes Ahura Mazda by name), but also all the other divinities that are alluded to in these texts. In this non-specific sense of the term, Amesha Spenta is then equivalent to the term yazata.

Non-specific usage is significantly less common than the use of the term to specifically denote the great divine entities (see above). The non-specific usage is particularly evident in the 9th-14th century texts of Zoroastrian tradition, but there are also instances in the Avesta proper where it is used this way. In Yasna 1.2 for instance, the yazata Atar is declared to be "the most active of the Amesha Spentas." Even in present-day Zoroastrianism, the term is frequently used to refer to the thirty-three divinities that have either a day-name dedication in the Zoroastrian calendar or that have a Yasht dedicated to them (or both).

This general, non-specific, meaning of the term Amesha Spenta also has an equivalent in the Vedic Sanskrit Vishve Amrtas, which is the collective term for all supernatural beings (lit: 'all immortals').

== Doctrine ==
The doctrine of the Amesha Spenta, through their connection with creation, unites ethereal and spiritual concepts with material and manifest objects in a "uniquely Zoroastrian" way: not only as abstract "aspects" of Ahura Mazda but also worthy of reverence themselves and personified or represented in all material things.

The relationship between Ahura Mazda and the Amesha Spenta is an altogether subtle one. In Yasna 31.11 of the Gathas, Ahura Mazda is said to have created the universe with his "thought". In other passages, such as Yasna 45.4, he is described as the metaphorical "father" of the individual Amesha Spenta, which, even though it is figurative, suggests a familial closeness. In particular, the relationship between Ahura Mazda and Spenta Mainyu is multifaceted and complex and "as hard to define as that of Yahweh and the Holy Spirit in Judaism and Christianity."

A veneration for the Amesha Spenta through the living world is still present in modern Zoroastrian tradition and is evident in every religious ceremony, when each of the Amesha Spenta is visibly represented by objects of which they are the guardians. In addition, the first seven days of the month of the Zoroastrian calendar are dedicated to the great heptad and to creation, acknowledging the preeminence of the Amesha Spenta and so ensuring the inculcation of their doctrine.

Ethical and ontological dualism in the same entity "accounts for the difficulty which some aspects of the doctrine have presented for Western scholars". The reverence of the Amesha Spenta and the Yazatas has been frequently attacked by non-Zoroastrian sources for its polytheist nature, not only in modern times but also the Sassanid era. While the "worship of the elements" was a repeated accusation during the 4th and 5th centuries,⁣ Christian missionaries (such as John Wilson) in 19th-century India specifically targeted the immanence of the Amesha Spenta as indicative of (in their view) a Zoroastrian polytheistic tradition worthy of attack.

A frequent target for criticism was the Zoroastrian credo in which the adherent declares, "I profess to be a worshiper of Mazda, follower of the teachings of Zoroaster, ... one who praises and reveres the Amesha Spenta" (the Fravaraneh, Yasna 12.1). Some modern Zoroastrian theologians, especially those identifying with the Reformist school of thought, believe that ethereal spirit and physical manifestation are not separable in any sense and that a reverence of Ahura Mazda's creations is ultimately a worship of the Creator.

In the second half of the 19th century, Martin Haug proposed that Zoroaster himself had viewed the Amesha Spenta as merely philosophical abstractions and that a personification of the heptad was really a later corruption. The Parsis of Bombay gratefully accepted Haug's premise as a defense against the Christian missionaries and subsequently disseminated the idea as a Parsi interpretation, which corroborated Haug's theory. The "continuing monotheism" principle eventually became so popular that it is now almost universally accepted as doctrine.
