= Killing of Arash Kasravi =

Murder of a Zoroastrian priest in Iran

Arash Kasravi
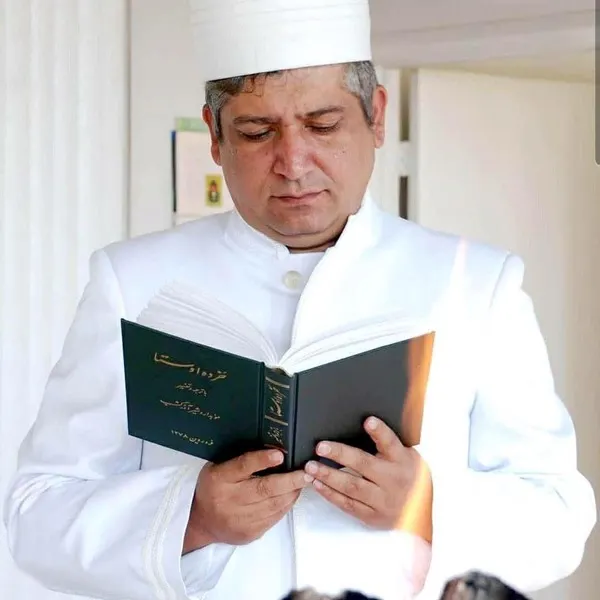
- Arash Kasravi in 2020
- Born: c. 1968
- Died: July 21, 2020; Kerman, Iran
- Occupations: Zoroastrian priest; community leader

Arash Kasravi was an Iranian-born Zoroastrian priest and community leader based in California who was murdered in Kerman, Iran, in July 2020 along with two associates under circumstances that remain unsolved. His murder drew concern in Zoroastrian communities about the treatment of religious minorities in Iran, but received only limited media coverage. As of 2025, Iranian authorities have not continued the investigation nor released any new information to the public or families of the victims.

== Killings ==
On July 21, 2020, Iranian-born Zoroastrian priest Arash Kasravi and two companions disappeared in Mahan, Kerman, Iran. Three days later, their bodies were discovered on July 24. Kasravi and a female associate (described as Kasravi's personal nurse) were found inside the trunk of his Citroën Xantia. A third victim was found elsewhere on his property. The killings were largely unreported in mainstream media and discussed mainly in Zoroastrian organizations and certain human-rights groups. The case highlighted discrimination against religious minorities in Iran and drew attention to the limited coverage of such incidents.

== Background ==
Arash Kasravi was an Iranian-born Zoroastrian priest (mobed) and community leader based in Irvine, California. He was the son of Dariush Kasravi and Mehrbanou Kavyani and grew up in the Kerman province of Iran. Before immigrating to the United States in the early 2010s with his wife, Kasravi worked with the Tehran-based and Zoroastrian weekly newspaper Amordad, where he edited the paper's "People" section. After settling in California with his wife, he served at a Zoroastrian fire temple and became active in the community, conducting religious ceremonies and mentoring younger Zoroastrians.

Kasravi was married to Gita Nikzad and had two children, Aurad and Deeba Kasravi. Friends and colleagues described him as dedicated to Zoroastrianism and its three core values (Good Thoughts, Good Words, Good Deeds), promoting these traditions among younger generations.

After the passing of his father, Kasravi went back to Iran to take part in memorial ceremonies and to settle family property and inheritance matters in his hometown of Kerman. Friends later reported that he had received warnings and even threats related to these land and inheritance issues before his trip, which was intended to be temporary and focused on his obligations to his family.

== Investigation ==
Iranian authorities described the case as a financially motivated triple homicide after discovering about US$10,000 in Kasravi's car, yet Iranian authorities never released any more information to Kasravi's family or the public, and the case remains unsolved. Iranian authorities also did not release information about performing an autopsy on any of the bodies.

Under Iranian law, when a Muslim kills a recognized religious minority, qisas does not automatically apply. A 1997 Human Rights Watch report pointed out that Article 2 of the Penal Code suggests that if a Muslim murders a non-Muslim, the Code doesn't always require punishment. The life of a non-Muslim has less legal protection than a Muslim in Iran, especially a religious minority. Some observers have argued that the handling of the case reflected these legal disparities.

== Suspect ==
The limited Iranian media covering the case identified Mohammad-Javad GanjaliKhani Hakimi as the main suspect. Local reports stated Mohammad was a business associate of Kasravi in his property matters and was found dead in what authorities described as a suicide. There was no autopsy performed on his body in order to make this a concrete assumption.

== Legal proceedings ==
Following the discovery of the bodies, the Kerman province prosecutor announced that the killings were being investigated as a financially motivated triple homicide. Local media identified Mohammad-Javad GanjaliKhani Hakimi as the primary suspect. Authorities stated that Hakimi "died by suicide shortly after the killings," and reported the arrest of two individuals accused of assisting in concealing the crime. No further information on the two individuals arrested was released, nor was any evidence put forward proving Hakimi committed suicide or the killings. As of 2025, Iranian officials have effectively abandoned the case, releasing no new information since 2020, the year of the murder. Iranian authorities never released detailed court documents or public trial records.

== Funeral and memorials ==
Kasravi's funeral was held on August 3, 2020, at the Zoroastrian cemetery in Kerman, Iran. The funeral process began at the Kerman Fire Temple, where Zoroastrian priests performed traditional rites before the burial. Community members from Kerman and other Iranian cities attended despite restrictions and widespread concern about the circumstances of his death. Outside Iran, the California Zoroastrian Center (CZC) organized a memorial in his honor.

== Reaction ==
Arash Kasravi's murder drew strong responses from Zoroastrian organizations in Iran and the United States. The California Zoroastrian Center (CZC), where Kasravi served as a priest, issued a public statement expressing grief and outrage, calling for a full investigation into the murder. The Federation of Zoroastrian Associations of North America (FEZANA) also released a statement mourning the death of Kasravi and urged Iranian authorities to find the killer. Nobody has been publicly charged or convicted of the killing.

Persian news outlets such as Amordad (which Kasravi had worked with previously) and IranWire covered the case and questioned the thoroughness of the investigation.

Human Rights Watch and Amnesty International have long documented discrimination against religious minorities in Iran, especially Zoroastrians, noting that Iran's penal code can provide weaker protection when a Muslim kills a non-Muslim. Neither group released a specific report on Kasravi, yet their broader statements on minority rights were cited in coverage of the case to highlight systemic problems in obtaining justice for religious-minority victims.

As of 2025, no organizations have released anything past their initial statements. Iranian authorities haven't either, effectively abandoning the case.

== Religious-minority context in Iran ==
Zoroastrians are one of the few religious minorities formally recognized in the Constitution of Iran, alongside Jews, Christians, and a small group of others. Despite this recognition, human-rights organizations such as Human Rights Watch and Amnesty International report that these communities face discrimination in employment, property rights, and legal protections.

Iran's penal code provides unequal treatment in cases of violent crime: when a Muslim kills a non-Muslim, qisas (equal retribution) does not automatically apply, and compensation (known as diya or blood money) can be set at a lower amount for non-Muslim victims.

Zoroastrian leaders have repeatedly expressed concern that these conditions leave their community vulnerable and discourage thorough investigation when crimes are committed against them. Observers have cited the Kasravi case as an example of these concerns, noting no information about diya or qisas application being made public.

== See also ==
- Zoroastrians in Iran
- Persecution of Zoroastrians
- Human rights in Iran
