= Zoroastrianism in the United States =

Overview of the Zoroastrian populace in the United States

This article focuses on Zoroastrianism in the United States. The Federation of Zoroastrian Associations of North America seeks to connect communities in the United States and Canada.

== Overview ==
The oldest fire temple in the United States was one purchased by Arbab Rustam Guiv in New Rochelle, New York. The most notable fire temple in the United States is the Dar-e-Mehr temple located in Pomona, New York. It was purchased in 2001 and subsequently purpose-built according to Zoroastrian tenets and then inaugurated in April 2016.

== Demographics ==
In 2006, the United States had the world's third-largest Zoroastrian population at six thousand adherents. Based on mailing addresses rather than congregations, there are two U.S. counties where Zoroastrians constitute the second-largest religion after Christianity. According to a 2010 census by the Association of Statisticians of American Religious Bodies, there are also two U.S. counties where Zoroastrians constitute the joint-second-largest religion along with Baháʼí Faith, by number of adherents. The Federation of Zoroastrian Associations of North America (FEZANA) is based in the United States and also quarterly publishes the Fezana Journal. It claimed that the American Zoroastrian community grew by 33.5% between 2004 and 2012 to 15,000 adherents, while the overall North American community grew by 24.4% to 20,847 adherents.

== See also ==
- List of countries by Zoroastrian population
