= Dolly Dastoor =

Canadian clinical psychologist and Zoroastrian leader (born 1969)

- Born: 16 November 1939 (age 86); Mumbai, Maharashtra, India
- Education: University of Bombay; Concordia University (PhD)
- Employer(s): University of Ibadan; McGill University
- Organization(s): Zonta International; Alzheimer Society of Montreal; Alzheimer Society of Canada; Canadian Psychological Association; Federation of the Zoroastrian Associations of North America (FEZANA); Parliament of the World's Religions; Montreal Council of Women
- Children: 3

Dolly Dastoor (born 16 November 1939) is an Indian-born Canadian clinical psychologist and expert in geriatric psychiatry, particularly dementia assessment and care. She co-developed the "Hierarchic Dementia Scale for Assessment and Prognosis of Dementia" (HDS), was president of the Alzheimer Society of Montreal and vice president of the Alzheimer Society of Canada. She has also conducted research on schizophrenia.

Dastoor is a Zoroastrian, was president of the Federation of the Zoroastrian Associations of North America (FEZANA) and served as the vice-chair of the Parliament of the World's Religions from 2020 to 2021. She is a leader in both Zoroastrianism and interfaith dialogue.

== Early life ==
Dastoor was born on 16 November 1939 in Mumbai, Maharashtra, India, to a traditional Zoroastrian family. She was the second oldest of four children.

Dastoor's family supported women’s education and she was inspired by an aunt who completed her master’s degree in French language. Dastoor attended a convent girls’ school then studied undergraduate and master's degrees in psychology at the University of Bombay (now the University of Mumbai).

Dastoor married her husband in 1964 and moved to Nigeria, where he worked for the Nigerian Ministry of Education. They had three children together.

== Career ==
=== Clinical psychology ===
Dastoor worked at the University of Ibadan (UI) in Ibadan, Nigeria, where she was a Senior Research Fellow in the Department of Psychiatry and as coordinator of the World Health Organization (WHO) project on Schizophrenia. She was a member of Zonta International on the university campus and the president of the university Women’s Club from 1969 to 1873.

In 1973, Dastoor and her family emigrated in Canada. While working on pharmacological research projects, she found that the families of patients relied on comparing notes for how to cope with managing their loved ones’ home care. This led to her co-founding of the Alzheimer Society of Montreal, of which Dastoor was president from 1986 to 1991. She was vice president of the Alzheimer Society of Canada and treasurer of the Aging Division of the Canadian Psychological Association.

Dastoor worked as a clinical psychologist at Douglas Hospital Centre in Montreal, Quebec, in the 1980s. She received her doctorate from Concordia University in Montreal, Quebec, in 1999.

With geriatric psychiatrist Martin Cole, in 1987 Dastoor developed the "Hierarchic Dementia Scale for Assessment and Prognosis of Dementia" (HDS) for the prognosis of the disease. The test measures the loss over time of cognitive and physical functions. In 2000, Dastoor contributed to the publication Clinical Diagnosis and Management of Alzheimer's Disease.

Dastoor worked as Assistant Professor in Psychiatry and Chair of the Education Committee of the McGill University Research Centre for Studies in Aging (MCSA). In 2019, she was awarded the 2019 MCSA Lifetime Achievement Award for her work in dementia care. After retiring, in 2020 Dastoor established the "Dolly Dastoor Research Award" to support graduate students enrolled at the School of Physical and Occupational Therapy (SPOT) of McGill University on her 80th birthday.

=== Zoroastrianism ===
Dastoor is a Zoroastrian and leader in the Zoroastrian community in North America. She was president of the Zoroastrian Association of Quebec, president of the Federation of the Zoroastrian Associations of North America (FEZANA) and editor-in chief of the FEZANA journal. In 1982, she chaired the North American Zoroastrian Congress and in 2000, she co-chaired the 7th World Zoroastrian Congress in Houston, Texas, United States, the first time when the World Congress was held outside of Iran or India.

Dastoor was elected to the board of trustees of the Parliament of the World's Religions in 2016, as the only Zoroastrian on the board. She was co-chair of the Parliament’s Women’s Task Force, advocating for the role of women within interfaith dialogue. She served as the vice-chair of the Parliament from 2020 to 2021. She was then president of the Montreal Council of Women (WCM) [fr] from 2021 to 2022.
