= List of countries by Zoroastrian population =

The Faravahar, one of the most prominent symbols used to represent Zoroastrianism

In 2012, a study by the Federation of Zoroastrian Associations of North America (FEZANA) published a demographic picture of Zoroastrianism around the world, in comparison with an earlier study from 2004. The study projected a global Zoroastrian population of 111,691–121,962 people, with roughly half of this figure residing in just two countries: India and Iran. These numbers indicated a notable population decline in comparison with the earlier projection of 124,953 people. Besides Iran and India, Zoroastrians are found in Pakistan, Afghanistan, China, Bangladesh, Kazakhstan, Tajikistan, Sri Lanka, Uzbekistan, the United States, the United Kingdom and Canada.

The larger part of the Zoroastrian population consists of the Parsis, a community standing at around 50,000 people in India according to the 2011 census and around 2,348 Parsis in Pakistan according to the 2023 census. In 1994, the Zoroastrian Society of Ontario estimated that there were around 100–200 Zoroastrians residing in Afghanistan.

In 2015, the Kurdistan Region of Iraq (KRI) granted official recognition to the Zoroastrian religion and also proceeded with the opening of three new Zoroastrian temples. The KRI's Zoroastrian community has claimed that thousands of people residing in the autonomous territory have recently converted to Zoroastrianism from Islam. In 2020, a KRI-based Zoroastrian advocacy group known as the Yasna Association, which also functions as a representative of the faith within the KRI's government, claimed that about 15,000 people had been registered with the organization as of 2014. However, 2024 estimates showed a smaller figure of nearly 5,000 living in the region, primarily in Sulaymaniah Governorate.

A 2020 social media-based survey by GAMAAN found a much larger percentage of Iranians identifying as Zoroastrians at 7.7% while two 2022 surveys from GAMAAN found 1% to 5% identifying as Zoroastrian. The survey is however questionable as it used self-selecting participants, reached through social media and chain referrals. According to Iran’s 1996 census, the Zoroastrian population stood at nearly 28,000. By 2006, it had dropped to 19,823. The 2016 census recorded 23,109 Zoroastrians in Iran.

The Federation of Zoroastrian Associations of North America put the number of Zoroastrians in Iran at up to 25,271 in 2012, equivalent to 0.03% of an 87.6 million population. There are no official numbers for the Zoroastrian population in the US. The World Zoroastrian Federation estimates the number between 10,000 and 15,000, while the North American Zoroastrian Association puts it closer to 20,000, including both Iranian Zoroastrians and Indian Parsis.

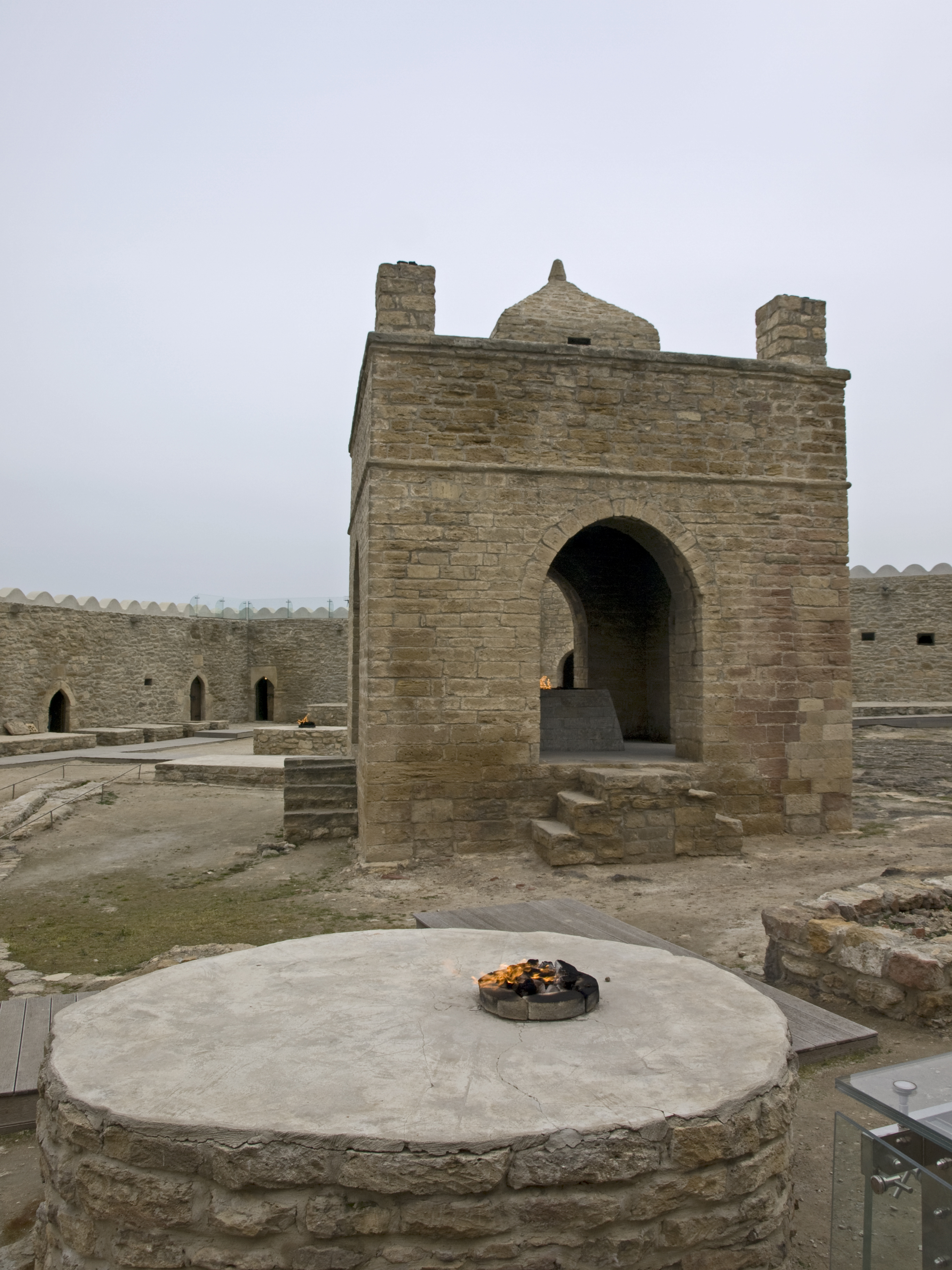
Zoroastrian fire temple in the city of Baku, Azerbaijan (2016)

| Country/Region | Population | Year |
|---|---|---|
| India | 50,000 | 2011 (Indian census) |
| Iran | 23,109 | 2016 (2016 census of Iran) |
| United States | 14,405 | 2012 |
| Canada | 7,285 | 2021 (Canadian census) |
| Kurdistan Region of Iraq | 5,000 | 2024 |
| Australia | 2,987 | 2021 (Australian census) |
| Pakistan | 2,348 | 2023 (Pakistani census) |
| Bahrain, Kuwait, Oman, Qatar and United Arab Emirates (Gulf States) | 1,900 | 2012 |
| New Zealand | 1,020 | 2013 |
| Uzbekistan | 1,000 | 2023 |
| Europe | 6,500 | 2025 |
| Rest of Central Asia | 500 | 2012 |
| Singapore | 400 | 2020 |
| Hong Kong | 232 | 2015 |
| World | 121,962 | 2012 |

== See also ==
- Iranian religions
  - Zoroastrianism
- Muslim conquest of Persia
  - Persecution of Zoroastrians
