= Zoroastrianism =

Iranian religion founded by Zoroaster

- 𐬨𐬀𐬰𐬛𐬀𐬌𐬌𐬀𐬯𐬥𐬀
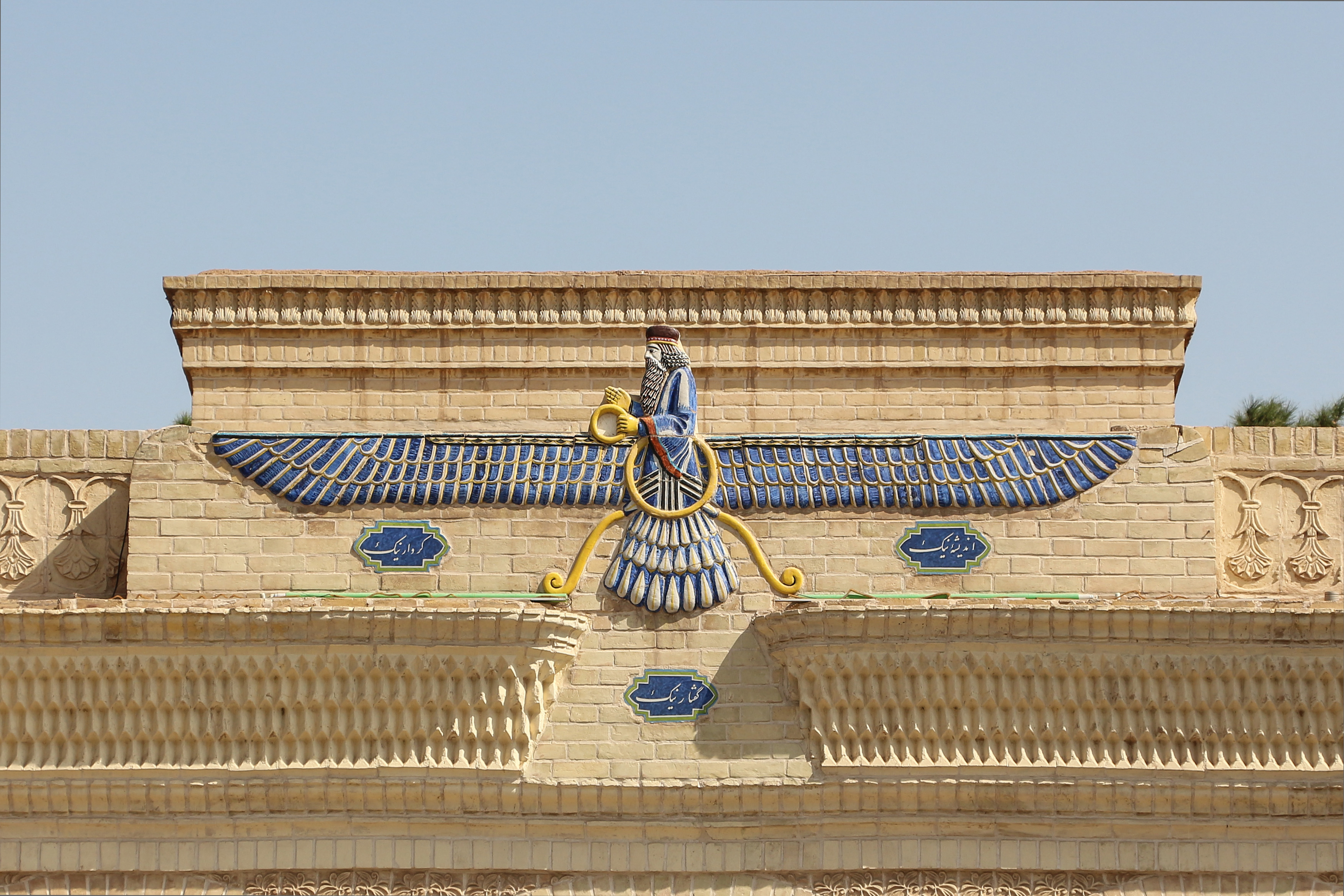
- Farr-e Kiyani, one of the most prominent symbols of Zoroastrianism, on the Fire Temple of Yazd, Iran
- Type: Ethnic religion
- Classification: Iranian
- Scripture: Avesta
- Theology: Monotheism, historically Henotheism or hierarchical polytheism with ethical dualism
- Region: Greater Iran (historically)
- Language: Avestan
- Founder: Zoroaster
- Origin: c. mid-6th century BCE; Iranian Plateau
- Separated from: Proto-Indo-Iranian religion Mazdaism
- Separations: Zurvanism; Mazdakism
- Number of followers: 125,000 (Zoroastrians)

Zoroastrianism, (Note: Persian: دین زرتشتی, romanized: Dīn-e Zartoshtī) also called Mazdayasna (Note: Avestan: 𐬨𐬀𐬰𐬛𐬀𐬌𐬌𐬀𐬯𐬥𐬀, romanized: Mazdaiiasna) and Behdin, (Note: Persian: بهدین, romanized: behdīn) is an Iranian religion centred on the Avesta and the teachings of Zarathushtra Spitama, who is more commonly referred to by the Greek translation of his name, Zoroaster (Ancient Greek: Ζωροάστρις, romanized: Zōroastris). Among the world's oldest organized faiths, its adherents exalt an uncreated, benevolent, and all-wise deity known as Ahura Mazda (Avestan: 𐬀𐬵𐬎𐬭𐬀 𐬨𐬀𐬰𐬛𐬁, lit. 'Lord of Wisdom'), who is hailed as the supreme being of the universe.

In the foundational hymns of Zoroastrianism, the Gathas, the primary dualism is ethical and psychological rather than cosmic, centred on the choice between Asha (truth, order, and cosmic progress) and Druj (chaos, distortion, and the lie). Within this early theological framework, Ahura Mazda is the supreme, transcendent Creator who stands above the conflict. The direct opposition exists between the Twin Mentalities (Mainyu): Spenta Mainyu (the progressive, constructive spirit) and Angra Mainyu (the destructive, regressive spirit), both of whom exercised free will at the beginning of creation.

The concept of a strict, symmetrical cosmic dualism—wherein Angra Mainyu (Ahriman) is elevated to a co-equal, primordial adversary of Ahura Mazda himself—is a later development prominent in non-canonical Middle Persian (Pahlavi) texts like the 9th-century Bundahishn. Furthermore, rather than predicting a passive apocalypse where God single-handedly destroys evil, the Gathas emphasize Frashokereti (the "making fresh" or renovation of the world), a collaborative, evolutionary process achieved through the progressive thoughts, words, and actions of humanity.

Opinions vary among scholars as to whether Zoroastrianism is monotheistic, polytheistic, henotheistic, or a combination of all three. Prominent modern Iranologists and linguists heavily reject the flat imposition of 'monotheism' on early Zoroastrianism. Prods Oktor Skjærvø explicitly excludes monotheism, admitting both ethical dualism and polytheism into the Gathic framework. Furthermore, Almut Hintze and Jean Kellens have documented how using Judeo-Christian parameters to label the faith creates a false, inadequate binary, masking the reality of a multi-divinity henotheistic system where other Gods (Yazatas) are naturally revered alongside the supreme Creator.

Originating from Zoroaster's reforms of the ancient Iranian religion, Zoroastrianism began during the Avestan period (possibly as early as the 2nd millennium BCE), but was first recorded in the mid-6th century BCE. For the following millennium, it was the official religion of successive Iranian polities, beginning with the Achaemenid Empire, which formalized and institutionalized many of its tenets and rituals, and ending with the Sasanian Empire, which revitalized the faith and standardized its teachings. In the 7th century CE, the rise of Islam and the ensuing Muslim conquest of Persia marked the beginning of the decline of Zoroastrianism. The persecution of Zoroastrians by the early Muslims in the nascent Rashidun Caliphate prompted much of the community to migrate to the Indian subcontinent, where they were granted asylum and became the progenitors of today's Parsis.

Once widely practiced in pre-Islamic Iran, with adherents numbering in the millions, Zoroastrianism now has a comparatively small population concentrated in India, Iran, and diaspora communities, particularly in North America. A demographic survey conducted in 2012 by the Federation of Zoroastrian Associations of North America (FEZANA) estimated the worldwide Zoroastrian population at between 111,691 and 121,962, depending on the population figure used for Iran. According to the 2011 census of India, there were 57,264 Parsis and Zoroastrians in India. The FEZANA survey estimated 14,405 Zoroastrians in the United States and 6,442 in Canada. Scholarly estimates for Iran's historical Zoroastrian communities have ranged from approximately 11,000 to 25,000. Low birth rates, population ageing and emigration have contributed to demographic decline within established Zoroastrian communities.

The central beliefs and practices of Zoroastrianism are contained in the Avesta, a compendium of sacred texts assembled over several centuries. Its oldest and most central component is the Gathas, purported to be the direct teachings of Zoroaster and his account of conversations with Ahura Mazda. These writings are part of a major section of the Avesta called the Yasna, which forms the core of Zoroastrian liturgy. Zoroaster's religious philosophy divided the early Iranian gods of Proto-Indo-Iranian paganism into emanations of the natural world—the ahura and the daeva; the former class consisting of divinities to be revered and the latter class consisting of divinities to be rejected and condemned. Zoroaster proclaimed that Ahura Mazda was the supreme creator and sustaining force of the universe, working in gētīg (the visible material realm) and mēnōg (the invisible spiritual and mental realm) through the Amesha Spenta, a class of seven divine entities that represent various aspects of the universe and the highest moral good. Emanating from Ahura Mazda is Spenta Mainyu (the Holy or Bountiful Spirit), the source of life and goodness, which is opposed by Angra Mainyu (the Destructive or Opposing Spirit), who is born from Aka Manah (evil thought). Angra Mainyu was further developed by Middle Persian literature into Ahriman (Middle Persian: 𐭠𐭧𐭫𐭬𐭭𐭩), Ahura Mazda's direct adversary. The two terms are synonymous.

Zoroastrian doctrine holds that, within this cosmic dichotomy, human beings have the choice between Asha ('truth', 'cosmic order'), the principle of righteousness or "rightness" that is promoted and embodied by Ahura Mazda, and Druj ('falsehood', 'deceit'), the essential nature of Angra Mainyu that expresses itself as greed, wrath, and envy. Thus, the central moral precepts of the religion are good thoughts (humata), good words (hukhta), and good deeds (huvarshta), which are recited in many prayers and ceremonies. Many of the practices and beliefs of ancient Iranian religion can still be seen in Zoroastrianism, such as reverence for nature and its elements, such as water (aban). Fire (atar) is held by Zoroastrians to be particularly sacred as a symbol of Ahura Mazda himself, serving as a focal point of many ceremonies and rituals, and serving as the basis for Zoroastrian places of worship, which are known as fire temples.

== Etymology ==
The name Zoroaster (Ζωροάστηρ) is a Greek rendering of the Avestan name Zarathustra. He is known as Zartosht and Zardosht in Persian and Zaratosht in Gujarati. The Zoroastrian name of the religion is Mazdayasna, which combines Mazda- with the Avestan word yasna, meaning "worship, devotion". In English, an adherent of the faith is commonly called a Zoroastrian or a Zarathustrian. An older expression still used today is Behdin, meaning "of the good religion", deriving from beh < Middle Persian weh 'good' + din < Middle Persian dēn < Avestan daēnā". In the Zoroastrian liturgy, this term is used as a title for a lay individual who has been formally inducted into the religion in a Navjote ceremony, in contrast to the priestly titles of osta, osti, ervad (hirbod), mobed and dastur.

The first surviving reference to Zoroaster in English scholarship is attributed to Thomas Browne (1605–1682), who briefly refers to Zoroaster in his 1643 Religio Medici. The term Mazdaism (/ˈmæzdə.ɪzəm/) is an alternative form in English used as well for the faith, taking Mazda- from the name Ahura Mazda and adding the suffix -ism to suggest a belief system.

== Theology ==
The theological category of Zoroastrianism is hard to define. The reasons are the difficulties in assigning precise dates to the principal texts and the fact that many contain much older material. Furthermore, Zoroastrianism shaped only slowly over time and was not complete even by the time of the Muslim conquest of Persia. Polytheistic, monotheistic, and dualistic strands can be identified in the wider Zoroastrian tradition, with dualism being the dominant tendency. The major difference to Manichaeism lies in the insistence of good in the creation account.

Zoroastrians treat Ahura Mazda as the supreme god, but believe in lesser divinities known as yazatas ("beings worthy of worship"), who share some similarities with the angels in Abrahamic religions. These yazatas include Anahita, Sraosha, Mithra, Rashnu, and Tishtrya. Historian Richard Foltz has put forth evidence that Iranians of the pre-Islamic era worshipped all these figures; especially the gods Mithra and Anahita.

Some scholars believe Zoroastrianism started as an Indo-Iranian polytheistic religion: according to Yujin Nagasawa, "like the rest of the Zoroastrian texts, the Old Avesta does not teach monotheism". By contrast, Md. Sayem characterizes Zoroastrianism as being one of the oldest monotheistic religions in the world.

Prods Oktor Skjærvø states Zoroastrianism is henotheistic, and "a dualistic and polytheistic religion, but with one supreme god, who is the father of the ordered cosmos". Brian Arthur Brown states that this is unclear, because historic texts present a conflicting picture, ranging from Zoroastrianism's belief in "one god, two gods, or a best god henotheism". Economist Mario Ferrero suggests that Zoroastrianism transitioned from polytheism to monotheism due to political and economic pressures.

In the 19th century, through contact with Western academics and missionaries, Zoroastrianism experienced a massive theological change that still affects it today. The Rev. John Wilson led various missionary campaigns in India against the Parsi community, disparaging the Parsis for their "dualism" and "polytheism" and as having unnecessary rituals while declaring the Avesta to not be "divinely inspired". This caused mass dismay in the relatively uneducated Parsi community, which blamed its priests and led to some conversions towards Christianity. However, the arrival of the German orientalist and philologist Martin Haug led to a rallied defence of the faith through Haug's reinterpretation of the Avesta through Christianized and European orientalist lens. Haug postulated that Zoroastrianism was solely monotheistic with all other divinities reduced to the status of angels while Ahura Mazda became both omnipotent and the source of evil as well as good. Haug's thinking was subsequently disseminated as a Parsi interpretation, thus corroborating Haug's theory, and the idea became so popular that it is now almost universally accepted as doctrine (though being re-evaluated in modern Zoroastrianism and academia). It has been argued by Almut Hintze that this designation of monotheism is not wholly perfect and that Zoroastrianism instead has its "own form of monotheism" which combines elements of dualism and polytheism. Farhang Mehr asserts that Zoroastrianism is principally monotheistic with some dualistic elements.

Lenorant and Chevallier assert that Zoroastrianism's concept of divinity covers both being and mind as immanent entities, describing Zoroastrianism as having a belief in an immanent self-creating universe with consciousness as its special attribute, thereby putting Zoroastrianism in the pantheistic fold sharing its origin with Indian Hinduism.

== Nature of the divine ==
Zoroastrianism contains multiple classes of divine beings, typically organized into tiers and spheres of influence.

=== Ahuras ===
The class of divine beings known as Ahuras was inherited from the concept of the asura in prehistoric Indo-Iranian religion. In the Rig Veda, the asuras are the "older gods" who ruled over the primordial chaos of the universe. This includes figures such as "Father Asura", Varuna, and Mitra.

==== Ahura Mazda ====
Ahura Mazda, also known as Oromasdes, Ohrmazd, Ormazd, Ormusd, Hoormazd, Harzoo, Hormazd, Hormaz, and Hurmz, is the creator deity and the supreme god in Zoroastrianism. Ahura Mazda stands for the dual deity Mitrāˊ-Váruṇā of the Hindu holy book known as the Rigveda.

According to scholars, Ahura Mazda is an uncreated, omniscient, omnipotent, and benevolent God who has created the spiritual and material existences from infinite light and maintains the cosmic law of Asha. He is the first and most invoked spirit in Yasna, is unrivaled, has no equals, and presides over all creation. In Avesta, Ahura Mazda is the only true God, and the representation of goodness, light, and truth. He conflicts with the evil spirit Angra Mainyu, the representation of evil, darkness, and deceit. Angra Mainyu's goal is to tempt humans away from Ahura Mazda. Notably, Angra Mainyu is not a creation of Ahura Mazda but an independent entity. The belief in Ahura Mazda, the "Lord of Wisdom" who is considered an all-encompassing Deity and the only existing one, is the foundation of Zoroastrianism.

=== Yazata ===
The Yazata (Avestan: 𐬫𐬀𐬰𐬀𐬙𐬀) are divine beings worshiped by song and sacrifice in Zoroastrianism, in accordance with the Avesta. The word yazata is derived from 'Yazdan', the Old Persian word for 'god', and literally means "divinity worthy of worship or veneration". As a concept, it also contains a wide range of other meanings, though generally signifying (or used as an epithet of) a divinity.

The origins of Yazata are varied, with many also featured as gods in Hinduism and other Iranian religions. In modern Zoroastrianism, the Yazata are considered holy emanations of the creator, always devoted to him and obeying the will of Ahura Mazda. While subject to repression by the Islamic Caliphate, the Yazata were often framed as "angels" to counter accusation of polytheism (shirk). According to the Avesta The Yazata assist Ahura Mazda in his battle against the evil spirit, and are hypostases of moral or physical aspects of creation. The yazatas collectively are "the good powers under Ahura Mazda", who is "the greatest of the yazatas".

==== Notable Yazatas ====
- Ahura Mazda
- Mitra, or Mithra – was originally an Indo-Iranian god of "covenant, agreement, treaty, alliance, promise." Mitra is considered a being worthy of worship and is "characterized by riches".
- Anahita – formerly an Iranian water goddess
- Ātar (Fire)
- Rashnu – one of the three judges who pass judgment on the souls of people after death
- Sraosha or Srōsh
- Verethragna – who may be the Vedic god Indra

==== Amesha Spentas ====
Yazatas are further divided into Amesha Spentas, their "ham-kar" or "Collaborators" who are Lower Ranking divinities, and also certain healing plants, primordial creatures, the fravashis of the dead, and certain prayers that are themselves considered holy.

The Amesha Spentas and their "ham-kar" or "collaborator" Yazatas are as follows:

- Vohu Manah + Mah / Geush Urvan / Ram
- Asha Vahishta + Atar / Sraosha / Verethraghna
- Kshatra Vairya + Khwar / Mithra / Asman / Anaghran
- Spenta Armaiti + Ap / Daena / Ashi / Manthra Spenta
- Haurvatat + Tishtriya / Fravashi / Vata
- Ameretat + Rashnu / Arshtat / Zamyad

== Principal beliefs ==
=== Tenets of faith ===
Farr-e Kiyani, one of the primary symbols of Zoroastrianism, believed to be the depiction of the Khvarenah.

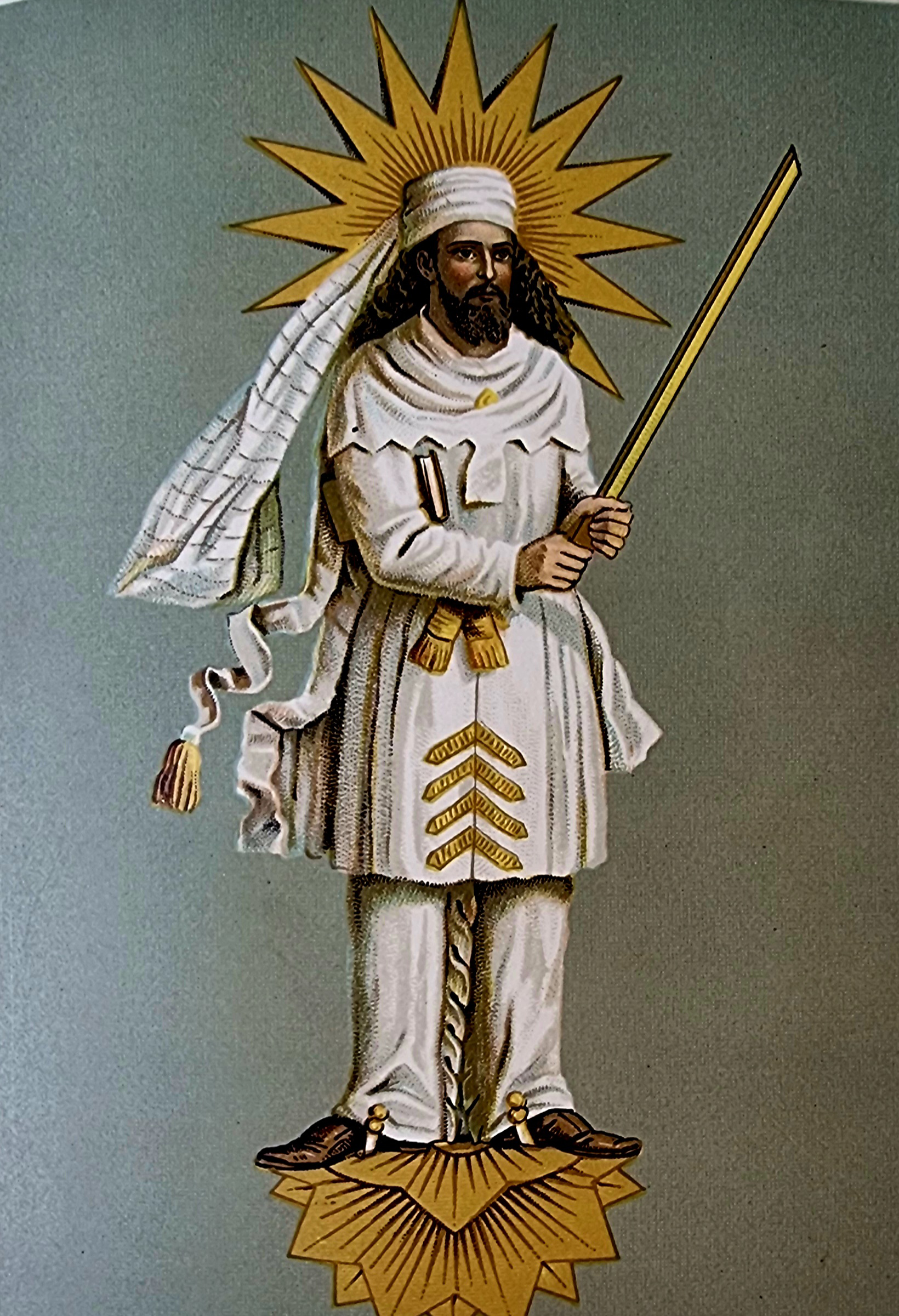
Zoroaster, Illustrations from History of the Parsis, 1884

In Zoroastrianism, Ahura Mazda is the beginning and the end, the creator of everything that can and cannot be seen, the eternal and uncreated, the all-good and source of Asha. In the Gathas, the most sacred texts of Zoroastrianism thought to have been composed by Zoroaster himself, Zoroaster acknowledged the highest devotion to Ahura Mazda, with worship and adoration also given to Ahura Mazda's manifestations (Amesha Spenta) and the other ahuras (Yazata) that support Ahura Mazda.

Daena (din in modern Persian and meaning "that which is seen") is representative of the sum of one's spiritual conscience and attributes, which through one's choice Asha is either strengthened or weakened in the Daena. Traditionally, the manthras (similar to the Hindu sacred utterance mantra) prayer formulas, are believed to be of immense power and the vehicles of Asha and creation used to maintain good and fight evil. Daena should not be confused with the fundamental principle of Asha, believed to be the cosmic order which governs and permeates all existence, and the concept of which governed the life of the ancient Indo-Iranians. For these, asha was the course of everything observable—the motion of the planets and astral bodies; the progression of the seasons; and the pattern of daily nomadic herdsman life, governed by regular metronomic events such as sunrise and sunset, and was strengthened through truth-telling and following the Threefold Path.

All physical creation (getig) was thus determined to run according to a master plan—inherent to Ahura Mazda—and violations of the order (druj) were violations against creation, and thus violations against Ahura Mazda. This concept of asha versus the druj should not be confused with Western and especially Christian notions of good versus evil, for although both forms of opposition express moral conflict, the asha versus druj concept is more systemic and less personal, representing, for instance, chaos (that opposes order); or "uncreation", evident as natural decay (that opposes creation); or more simply "the lie" (that opposes truth and goodness). Moreover, in the role as the one uncreated creator of all, Ahura Mazda is not the creator of druj, which is "nothing", anti-creation, and thus (likewise) uncreated and developed as the antithesis of existence through choice.

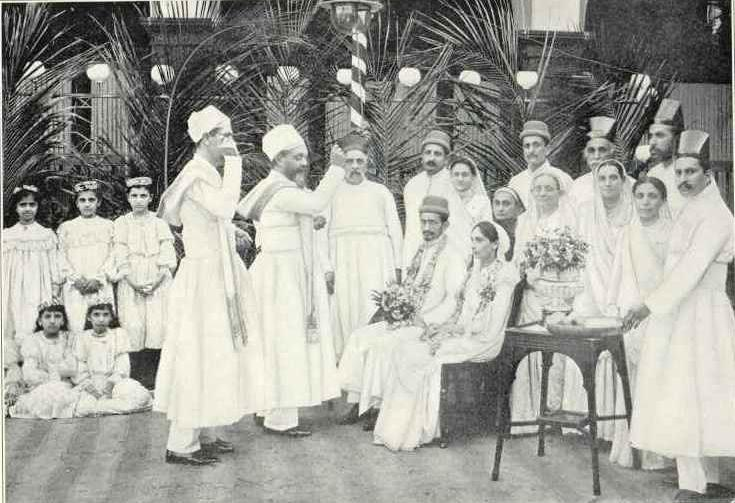
A Parsi Wedding, 1905

In this schema of asha versus druj, mortal beings (both humans and animals) play a critical role, for they too are created. Here, in their lives, they are active participants in the conflict, and it is their spiritual duty to defend Asha, which is under constant assault and would decay in strength without counteraction. Throughout the Gathas, Zoroaster emphasizes deeds and actions within society and accordingly extreme asceticism is frowned upon in Zoroastrianism but moderate forms are allowed within.

Humata, Huxta, Huvarshta (Good Thoughts, Good Words, Good Deeds), the Threefold Path of Asha, is considered the core maxim of Zoroastrianism especially by modern practitioners. In Zoroastrianism, good transpires for those who do righteous deeds for its own sake, not for the search of reward. Those who do evil are said to be attacked and confused by the druj and are responsible for aligning themselves back to Asha by following this path. There is also a heavy emphasis on spreading happiness, mostly through charity, and respecting the spiritual equality and duty of both men and women.

Central to Zoroastrianism is the emphasis on moral choice, to choose the responsibility and duty for which one is in the mortal world, or to give up this duty and so facilitate the work of druj. Similarly, predestination is rejected in Zoroastrian teaching and the absolute free will of all conscious beings is core, with even divine beings having the ability to choose. Humans bear responsibility for all situations they are in, and in the way they act toward one another. Reward, punishment, happiness, and grief all depend on how individuals live their lives.

In Zoroastrian tradition, life is a temporary state in which a mortal is expected to participate actively in the continuing battle between Asha and Druj. Prior to its incarnation at the birth of the child, the urvan (soul) of an individual is still united with its fravashi (personal/higher spirit), which has existed since Ahura Mazda created the universe. Prior to the splitting off of the urvan, the fravashi participates in the maintenance of creation led by Ahura Mazda. During the life of a given individual, the fravashi acts as a source of inspiration to perform good actions and as a spiritual protector. The fravashis of ancestors cultural, spiritual, and heroic, associated with illustrious bloodlines, are venerated and can be called upon to aid the living.

The religion states that active and ethical participation in life through good deeds formed from good thoughts and good words is necessary to ensure happiness and to keep chaos at bay. This active participation is a central element in Zoroaster's concept of free will, and Zoroastrianism as such rejects extreme forms of asceticism and monasticism but historically has allowed for moderate expressions of these concepts. On the fourth day after death, the urvan is reunited with its fravashi, whereupon the experiences of life in the material world are collected for use in the continuing battle for good in the spiritual world. For the most part, Zoroastrianism does not have a notion of reincarnation; albeit Followers of Ilm-e-Kshnoom in India, among other currently non-traditional opinions, believe in reincarnation and practice vegetarianism.

Zoroastrianism's emphasis on the protection and veneration of nature and its elements has led some to proclaim it as the "world's first proponent of ecology." The Avesta and other texts call for the protection of water, earth, fire, and air making it, in effect, an ecological religion: "It is not surprising that Mazdaism... is called the first ecological religion. The reverence for Yazatas (divine spirits) emphasizes the preservation of nature" (Avesta: Yasnas 1.19, 3.4, 16.9; Yashts 6.3–4, 10.13). However, this particular assertion is limited to natural forces held as emanations of asha by the fact that early Zoroastrians had a duty to exterminate "evil" species, a dictate no longer followed in modern Zoroastrianism. Although there have been various theological statements supporting vegetarianism in Zoroastrianism's history and those who believe that Zoroaster was vegetarian.

Zoroastrianism is not entirely uniform in theological and philosophical thought, especially with historical and modern influences having a significant impact on individual and local beliefs, practices, values, and vocabulary, sometimes merging with tradition and in other cases displacing it. The ultimate purpose in the life of a practicing Zoroastrian is to become an ashavan (a master of Asha) and to bring happiness into the world, which contributes to the cosmic battle against evil. The core teachings of Zoroastrianism include:

- Following the threefold path of Asha: Humata, Hūxta, Huvarshta (lit. 'good thoughts, good words, good deeds').
- Practicing charity to keep one's soul aligned with Asha and thus with spreading happiness.
- The spiritual equality and duty of men and women alike.
- Being good for the sake of goodness and without the hope of reward (see Ashem Vohu).

=== Cosmology ===
==== Cosmogony ====
According to the Zoroastrian creation myth, there is one universal, transcendent, all-good, and uncreated supreme creator deity Ahura Mazda, or the "Wise Lord" (Ahura meaning "Lord" and Mazda meaning "Wisdom" in Avestan). Zoroaster keeps the two attributes separate as two different concepts in most of the Gathas yet sometimes combines them into one form. Zoroaster also proclaims that Ahura Mazda is omniscient but not omnipotent. Ahura Mazda existed in light and goodness above, while Angra Mainyu, (also referred to in later texts as "Ahriman"), the destructive spirit/mentality, existed in darkness and ignorance below. They have existed independently of each other for all time, and manifest contrary substances. In the Gathas, Ahura Mazda is noted as working through emanations known as the Amesha Spenta and with the help of "other ahuras". These divine beings called Amesha Spentas, support him and are representative and guardians of different aspects of creation and the ideal personality. Ahura Mazda is immanent in humankind and interacts with creation through these bounteous/holy divinities. In addition to these, He is assisted by a league of countless divinities called Yazatas, meaning "worthy of worship." Each Yazata is generally a hypostasis of a moral or physical aspect of creation. Asha is the main spiritual force which comes from Ahura Mazda. It is the cosmic order and is the antithesis of chaos, which is evident as druj, falsehood and disorder, that comes from Angra Mainyu. The resulting cosmic conflict involves all of creation, mental/spiritual and material, including humanity at its core, which has an active role to play in the conflict. The main representative of Asha in this conflict is Spenta Mainyu, the creative spirit/mentality. Ahura Mazda then created the material and visible world itself in order to ensnare evil. He created the floating, egg-shaped universe in two parts: first the spiritual (menog) and 3,000 years later, the physical (getig). Ahura Mazda then created Gayomard, the archetypical perfect man, and Gavaevodata, the primordial bovine.

While Ahura Mazda created the universe and humankind, Angra Mainyu, whose very nature is to destroy, miscreated demons, evil daevas, and noxious creatures (khrafstar) such as snakes, ants, and flies. Angra Mainyu created an opposite, evil being for each good being, except for humans, which he found he could not match. Angra Mainyu invaded the universe through the base of the sky, inflicting Gayomard and the bull with suffering and death. However, the evil forces were trapped in the universe and could not retreat. The dying primordial man and bovine emitted seeds, which were protected by Mah, the Moon. From the bull's seed grew all beneficial plants and animals of the world and from the man's seed grew a plant whose leaves became the first human couple. Humans thus struggle in a two-fold universe of the material and spiritual trapped and in long combat with evil. The evils of this physical world are not products of an inherent weakness but are the fault of Angra Mainyu's assault on creation. This assault turned the perfectly flat, peaceful, and daily illuminated world into a mountainous, violent place that is half night. According to Zoroastrian cosmology, in articulating the Ahuna Vairya formula, Ahura Mazda made the ultimate triumph of good against Angra Mainyu evident. Ahura Mazda will ultimately prevail over the evil Angra Mainyu, at which point reality will undergo a cosmic renovation called Frashokereti and limited time will end. In the final renovation, all of creation—even the souls of the dead that were initially banished to or chose to descend into "darkness"—will be reunited with Ahura Mazda in the Kshatra Vairya (meaning "best dominion"), being resurrected to immortality.

==== Cosmography ====
Zoroastrian cosmography, which refers to the description of the structure of the cosmos in Zoroastrian literature and theology, involves a primary division of the cosmos into heaven and earth. The heaven is composed of three parts: the lower-most part, which is where the fixed stars may be found; the middle part, where the domain of the moon is located, and the upper part, which is the domain of the sun and unreachable by Ahirman. Further above the highest level of the heaven/sky includes regions described as the Endless Lights, as well as the Thrones of Amahraspandān and Ohrmazd. Although this is the basic framework which occurs in Avestan texts, later Zoroastrian literature would elaborate on this picture by further subdividing the lowest part of heaven to achieve a total of six or seven layers. The Earth itself was described as possessing three primary mountains: Mount Hukairiia, whose peak was the focal point of the revolution of the star Sadwēs; Mount Haraitī, whose peak was the focal point of the revolution of the sun and the moon, and the greatest of them all, the Harā Bərəz whose peak was located at the centre of the Earth and which was the first in a chain of 2,244 mountains which, together, encircled the Earth. Although the planets are not described in early Zoroastrian sources, they entered Zoroastrian thought in the Middle Persian period: they were demonized and took on the names Anāhīd (Pahlavi for Venus), Tīr (Mercury), Wahrām (Mars), Ohrmazd (Jupiter), and Kēwān (Saturn).

=== Eschatology ===
Individual judgment at death is at the Chinvat Bridge ("bridge of judgement" or "bridge of choice"), which each human must cross, facing a spiritual judgment, though modern belief is split as to whether it is representative of a mental decision during life to choose between good and evil or an afterworld location. Humans' actions under their free will through choice determine the outcome. According to tradition, the soul is judged by the Yazatas Mithra, Sraosha, and Rashnu, where depending on the verdict one is either greeted at the bridge by a beautiful, sweet-smelling maiden or by an ugly, foul-smelling old hag representing their Daena affected by their actions in life. The maiden leads the dead safely across the bridge, which widens and becomes pleasant for the righteous, towards the House of Song. The hag leads the dead down a bridge that narrows to a razor's edge and is full of stench until the departed falls off into the abyss towards the House of Lies. Those with a balance of good and evil go to Hamistagan, a purgatorial realm mentioned in the 9th century work Dadestan-i Denig.

The House of Lies is considered temporary and reformative; punishments fit the crimes, and souls do not rest in eternal damnation. Hell contains foul smells and evil food, a smothering darkness, and souls are packed tightly together although they believe they are in total isolation.

In ancient Zoroastrian eschatology, a 3,000-year struggle between good and evil will be fought, punctuated by evil's final assault. During the final assault, the sun and moon will darken, and humankind will lose its reverence for religion, family, and elders. The world will fall into winter, and Angra Mainyu's most fearsome miscreant, Azi Dahaka, will break free and terrorize the world.

According to legend, the final savior of the world, known as the Saoshyant, will be born to a virgin impregnated by the seed of Zoroaster while bathing in a lake. The Saoshyant will raise the dead—including those in all afterworlds—for final judgment, returning the wicked to hell to be purged of bodily sin. Next, all will wade through a river of molten metal in which the righteous will not burn but through which the impure will be completely purified. The forces of good will ultimately triumph over evil, rendering it forever impotent but not destroyed. The Saoshyant and Ahura Mazda will offer a bull as a final sacrifice for all time and all humans will become immortal. Mountains will again flatten and valleys will rise; the House of Song will descend to the moon, and the earth will rise to meet them both. Humanity will require two judgments because there are as many aspects to our being: spiritual (menog) and physical (getig).

== Practices and rituals ==
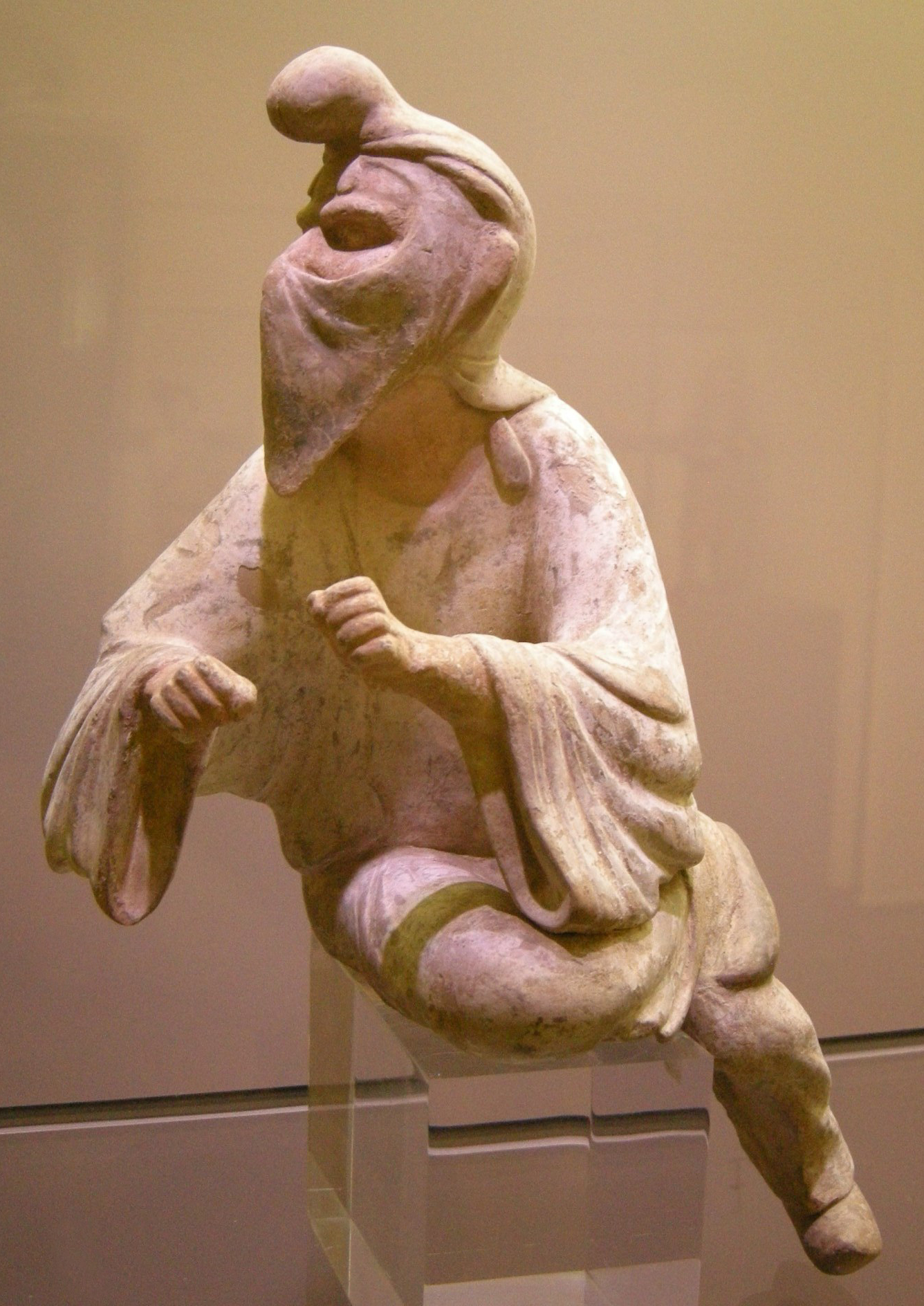
An 8th century Tang dynasty Chinese clay figurine of a Sogdian man wearing a distinctive cap and face veil, possibly a camel rider or even a Zoroastrian priest engaging in a ritual at a fire temple, since face veils were used to avoid contaminating the holy fire with breath or saliva; Museum of Oriental Art (Turin), Italy.

Throughout Zoroastrian history, shrines and temples have been the focus of worship and pilgrimage for adherents of the religion. Early Zoroastrians were recorded as worshiping in the 5th century BCE on mounds and hills where fires were lit below the open skies. In the wake of Achaemenid expansion, shrines were constructed throughout the empire and particularly influenced the role of Mithra, Aredvi Sura Anahita, Verethragna and Tishtrya, alongside other traditional Yazata who all have hymns within the Avesta and also local deities and culture-heroes. Today, enclosed and covered fire temples tend to be the focus of community worship where fires of varying grades are maintained by the clergy assigned to the temples.

The incorporation of cultural and local rituals is quite common and traditions have been passed down in historically Zoroastrian communities such as herbal healing practices, wedding ceremonies, and the like. Traditionally, Zoroastrian rituals have also included shamanic elements involving mystical methods such as spirit travel to the invisible realm and involving the consumption of fortified wine, Haoma, mang, and other ritual aids.

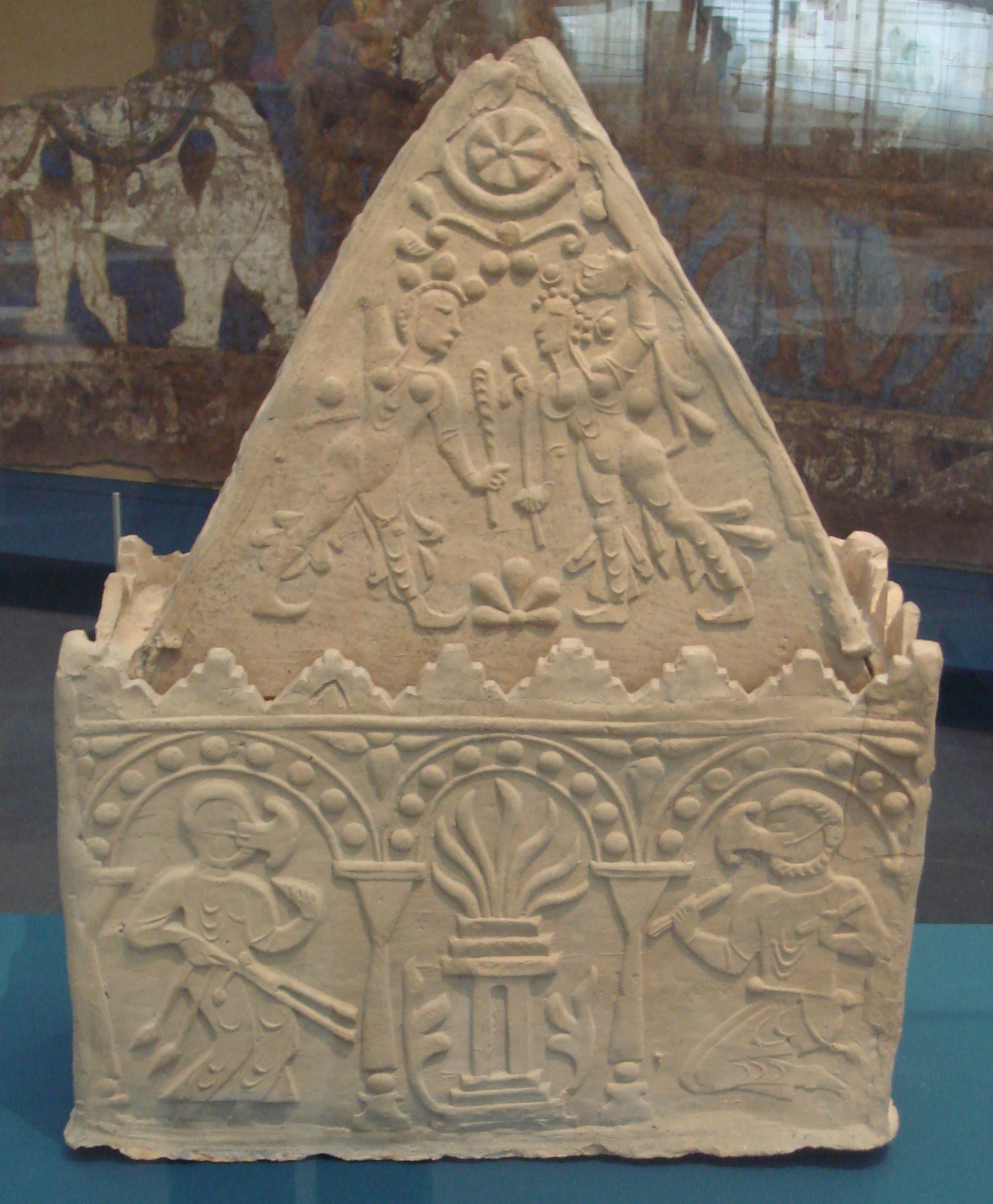
Ossuary with reliefs of Zoroastrian priests attending a fire, Mullakurgan (near Samarkand), Uzbekistan, 7–8th century CE.

According to former South Asian studies professor Bettina Robotika, purification ceremonies associated with water (aban) and fire (atar) are considered the basis of Zoroastrian ritual life. Some Zoroastrian communities practice ritual exposure, mainly in regions of the Indian subcontinent where the practice is legal and there are healthy populations of scavenger birds. A corpse is considered a host for decay or druj, and scripture enjoins that it be disposed in a manner that does not pollute the good creation. Structures called Towers of Silence are commonly identified with this practice.

The central ritual of Zoroastrianism is the Yasna, which is a recitation of the eponymous book of the Avesta and sacrificial ritual ceremony involving Haoma. Extensions to the Yasna ritual are possible through use of the Visperad and Vendidad, but such an extended ritual is rare in modern Zoroastrianism. The Yasna itself descended from Indo-Iranian sacrificial ceremonies and animal sacrifice of varying degrees are mentioned in the Avesta and are still practiced in Zoroastrianism albeit through reduced forms such as the sacrifice of fat before meals. High rituals such as the Yasna are considered to be the purview of the Mobads with a corpus of individual and communal rituals and prayers included in the Khordeh Avesta.

In orthodox Zoroastrianism, children of Zoroastrian parents are welcomed into the faith through the Navjote/Sedreh Pushi ceremony, which is traditionally conducted during the later childhood or pre-teen years of the aspirant, though there is no defined age limit for the ritual. After the ceremony, Zoroastrians are encouraged to wear their sedreh (ritual shirt) and kushti (ritual girdle) daily as a spiritual reminder and for mystical protection. Reformist Zoroastrians permit children of mixed-faith marriages and adult converts to perform the Navjote, and tend to only wear the sedreh and kushti during festivals, ceremonies, and prayers.

Historically, Zoroastrians are encouraged to pray the five daily Gāhs and to maintain and celebrate the various holy festivals of the Zoroastrian calendar, which can differ from community to community. Zoroastrian prayers, called manthras, are conducted usually with hands outstretched in imitation of Zoroaster's prayer style described in the Gathas and are of a reflectionary and supplicant nature believed to be endowed with the ability to banish evil. Devout Zoroastrians are known to cover their heads during prayer, either with traditional topi, scarves, other headwear, or even just their hands. However, full coverage and veiling which is traditional in Islamic practice is not a part of Zoroastrianism and Zoroastrian women in Iran wear their head coverings displaying hair and their faces to defy mandates by the Islamic Republic of Iran.

== Scripture ==
=== Avesta ===
The Avesta is a collection of the central religious texts of Zoroastrianism written in the old Iranian dialect of Avestan. The history of the Avesta is speculated upon in many Pahlavi texts with varying degrees of authority, with the current version of the Avesta dating at oldest from the times of the Sasanian Empire. The Avesta was "composed at different times, providing a series of snapshots of the religion that allow historians to see how it changed over time". According to Middle Persian tradition, Ahura Mazda created the 21 Nasks of the original Avesta which Zoroaster brought to Vishtaspa. Here, two copies were created, one which was put in the house of archives and the other put in the Imperial treasury. During Alexander's conquest of Persia, the Avesta (written on 1,200 ox-hides) was burned, and the scientific sections that the Greeks could use were dispersed among themselves. However, there is no strong historical evidence for this and they remain contested despite affirmations from the Zoroastrian tradition, whether it be the Denkart, Tansar-nāma, Ardāy Wirāz Nāmag, Bundahsin, Zand-i Wahman yasn or the transmitted oral tradition.

As tradition continues, under the reign of King Valax (identified with a Vologases of the Arsacid dynasty), an attempt was made to restore what was considered the Avesta. During the Sassanid Empire, Ardeshir ordered Tansar, his high priest, to finish the work that King Valax had started. Shapur I sent priests to locate the scientific text portions of the Avesta that were in the possession of the Greeks. Under Shapur II, Arderbad Mahrespandand revised the canon to ensure its orthodox character, while under Khosrow I, the Avesta was translated into Pahlavi.

The compilation of the Avesta can be authoritatively traced, however, to the Sasanian Empire, of which only fraction survive today if the Middle Persian literature is correct. The later manuscripts all date from after the fall of the Sasanian Empire, the latest being from 1288, 590 years after the fall of the Sasanian Empire. The texts that remain today are the Gathas, Yasna, Visperad and the Vendidad, of which the latter's inclusion is disputed within the faith. Along with these texts is the individual, communal, and ceremonial prayer book called the Khordeh Avesta, which contains the Yashts and other important hymns, prayers, and rituals. The rest of the materials from the Avesta are called "Avestan fragments" in that they are written in Avestan, incomplete, and generally of unknown provenance.

=== Middle Persian (Pahlavi) ===
Middle Persian and Pahlavi works created in the 9th and 10th century contain many religious Zoroastrian books, as most of the writers and copyists were part of the Zoroastrian clergy. The most significant and important books of this era include the Denkard, Bundahishn, Menog-i Khrad, Selections of Zadspram, Jamasp Namag, Epistles of Manucher, Rivayats, Dadestan-i-Denig, and Arda Viraf Namag. The scriptural status and authority of Middle Persian religious texts are disputed among Zoroastrians, as John Hinnells points out that “most Iranians stress the authority of revealed scripture, the Gāthās, rather than the later Pahlavi texts which ‘orthodox’ Parsis value.”

== History ==
=== Zoroaster ===
Zoroastrianism was founded by Zoroaster in ancient Persia (modern day Iran). The precise date of the founding of the religion is uncertain and estimates vary wildly from 2000 BCE to "200 years before Alexander". Zoroaster was born – in either Northeast Iran or Southwest Afghanistan – into a culture with a polytheistic religion, which featured excessive animal sacrifice and the excessive ritual use of intoxicants. His life was influenced profoundly by the attempts of his people to find peace and stability in the face of constant threats of raiding and conflict. Zoroaster's birth and early life are little documented but speculated upon heavily in later texts. What is known is recorded in the Gathas, forming the core of the Avesta, which contain hymns thought to have been composed by Zoroaster himself. Born into the Spitama clan, he refers to himself as a poet-priest and prophet. He had a wife, three sons, and three daughters, the numbers of which are gathered from a variety of texts.

Zoroaster rejected many of the gods of the Bronze Age Iranians and their oppressive class structure, in which the Kavis and Karapans (princes and priests) controlled the ordinary populace. He also opposed cruel animal sacrifices and the excessive use of the possibly hallucinogenic Haoma plant (conjectured to have been a species of ephedra or Peganum harmala), but did not condemn either practice outright, providing moderation was observed.

=== Legendary accounts ===
According to later Zoroastrian tradition, when Zoroaster was 30 years old, he went into the Daiti river to draw water for a Haoma ceremony; when he emerged, he received a vision of Vohu Manah. After this, Vohu Manah took him to the other six Amesha Spentas, where he received the completion of his vision. This vision radically transformed his view of the world, and he tried to teach this view to others. Zoroaster believed in one supreme creator deity and acknowledged this creator's emanations (Amesha Spenta) and other divinities which he called Ahuras (Yazata). Some of the deities of the old religion, the Daevas (etymologically similar to the Sanskrit Devas), appeared to delight in war and strife and were condemned as evil workers of Angra Mainyu by Zoroaster.

Zoroaster's ideas were not taken up quickly; he originally only had one convert: his cousin Maidhyoimanha.

==== Cypress of Kashmar ====
The Cypress of Kashmar is a mythical cypress tree of legendary beauty and gargantuan dimensions. It is said to have sprung from a branch brought by Zoroaster from Paradise and to have stood in today's Kashmar in northeastern Iran and to have been planted by Zoroaster in honour of the conversion of King Vishtaspa to Zoroastrianism. According to the Iranian physicist and historian Zakariya al-Qazwini King Vishtaspa had been a patron of Zoroaster who planted the tree himself. In his ʿAjā'ib al-makhlūqāt wa gharā'ib al-mawjūdāt, he further describes how the Abbasid caliph Al-Mutawakkil in 247 AH (861 CE) caused the mighty cypress to be felled, and then transported it across Iran, to be used for beams in his new palace at Samarra. Before, he wanted the tree to be reconstructed before his eyes. This was done in spite of protests by the Iranians, who offered a very great sum of money to save the tree. Al-Mutawakkil never saw the cypress, because he was murdered by a Turkish soldier (possibly in the employ of his son) on the night when it arrived on the banks of the Tigris.

==== Fire Temple of Kashmar ====
Kashmar Fire Temple was the first Zoroastrian fire temple built by Vishtaspa at the request of Zoroaster in Kashmar. In a part of Ferdowsi's Shahnameh, the story of finding Zarathustra and accepting Vishtaspa's religion is regulated that after accepting Zoroastrian religion, Vishtaspa sends priests all over the universe And Azar enters the fire temples (domes) and the first of them is Adur Burzen-Mihr who founded in Kashmar and planted a cypress tree in front of the fire temple and made it a symbol of accepting the Bahi religion And he sent priests all over the world, and commanded all the famous men and women to come to that place of worship.

According to the Paikuli inscription, during the Sasanian Empire, Kashmar was part of Greater Khorasan, and the Sasanians worked hard to revive the ancient religion. It still remains a few kilometers above the ancient city of Kashmar in the castle complex of Atashgah.

=== Early history ===
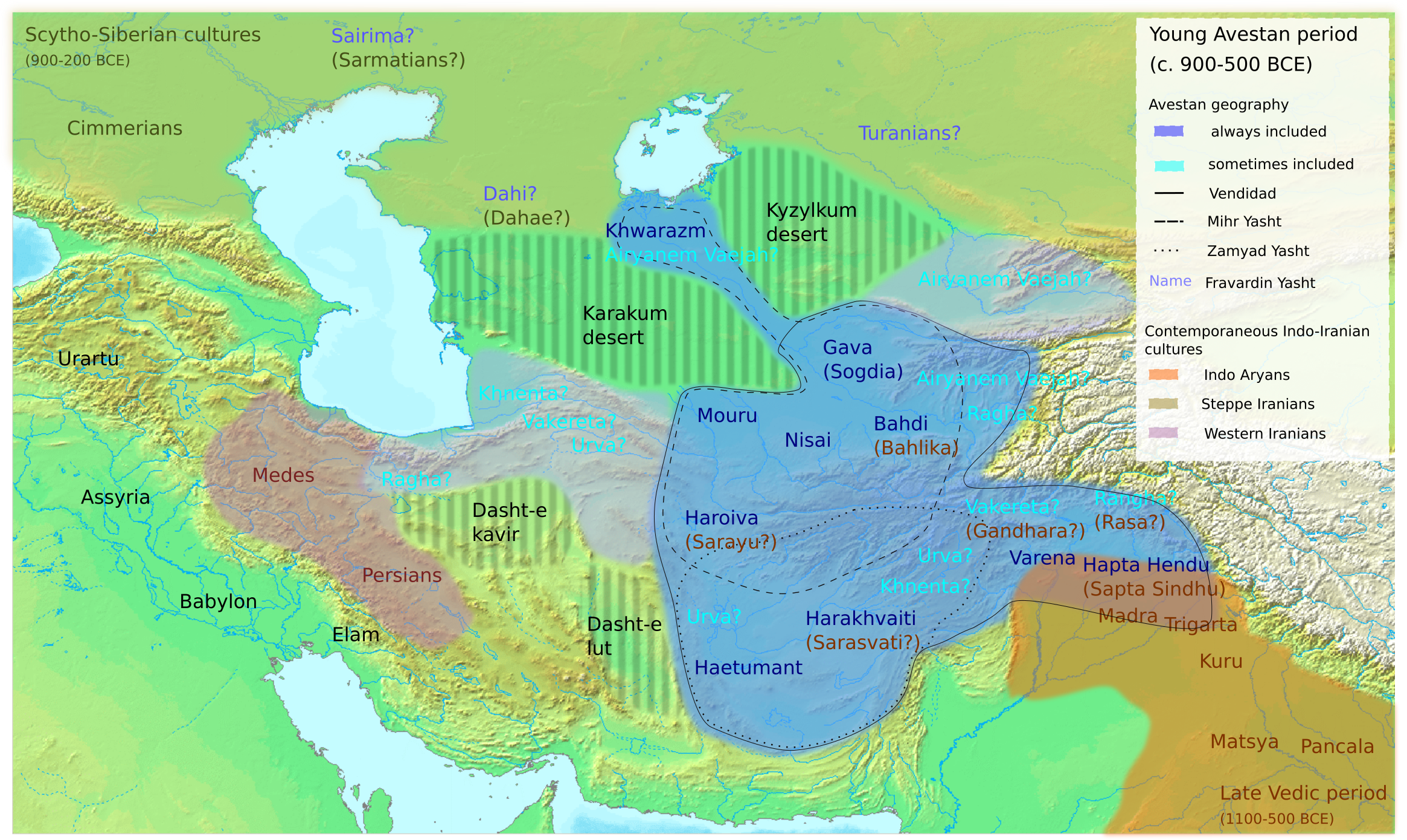
Geographical horizon of the Avestan people during the Young Avestan period. Sources for the different localizations are in the file description.

The roots of Zoroastrianism are thought to lie in a common prehistoric Indo-Iranian religious system dating back to the early 2nd millennium BCE. The prophet Zoroaster himself, though traditionally dated to the 6th century BCE, is thought by many modern historians to have been a reformer of the polytheistic Iranian religion who lived much earlier during the second half of the second millennium BCE. Zoroastrian tradition names Airyanem Vaejah as the home of Zarathustra and the birthplace of the religion. No consensus exists as to the localization of Airyanem Vaejah, but the region of Khwarezm has been considered by modern scholars as a candidate. Zoroastrianism as a religion was not firmly established until centuries later during the Young Avestan period. At this time, the Zoroastrian community was concentrated in the eastern portion of Greater Iran. Although no consensus exists on the chronology of the Avestan period, the lack of any discernable Persian and Median influence in the Avesta makes a time frame in the first half of the first millennium BCE likely.

=== Classical antiquity ===
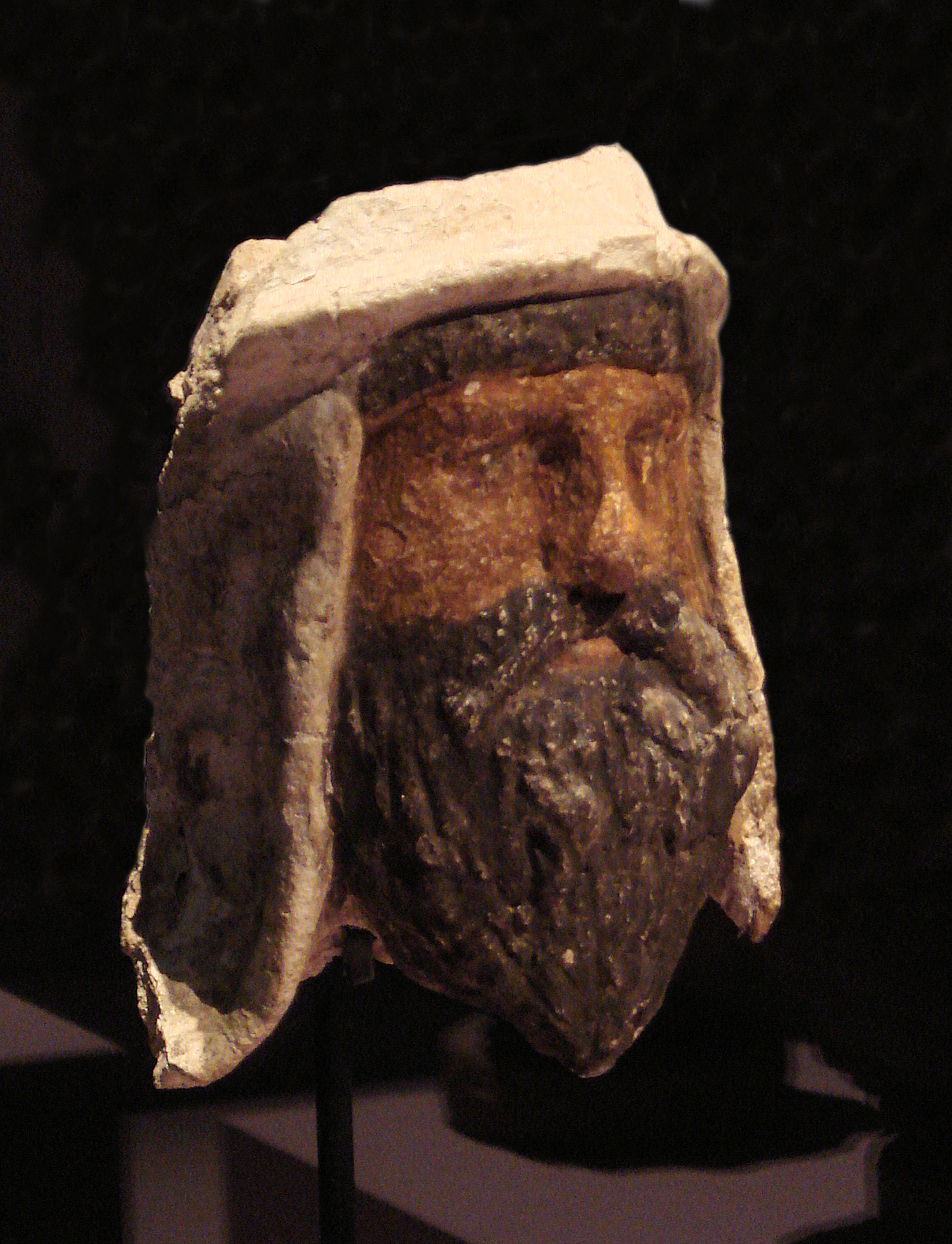
Painted clay and alabaster head of a Zoroastrian priest wearing a distinctive Bactrian-style headdress, Takhti-Sangin, Tajikistan, Greco-Bactrian kingdom, 3rd–2nd century BCE.

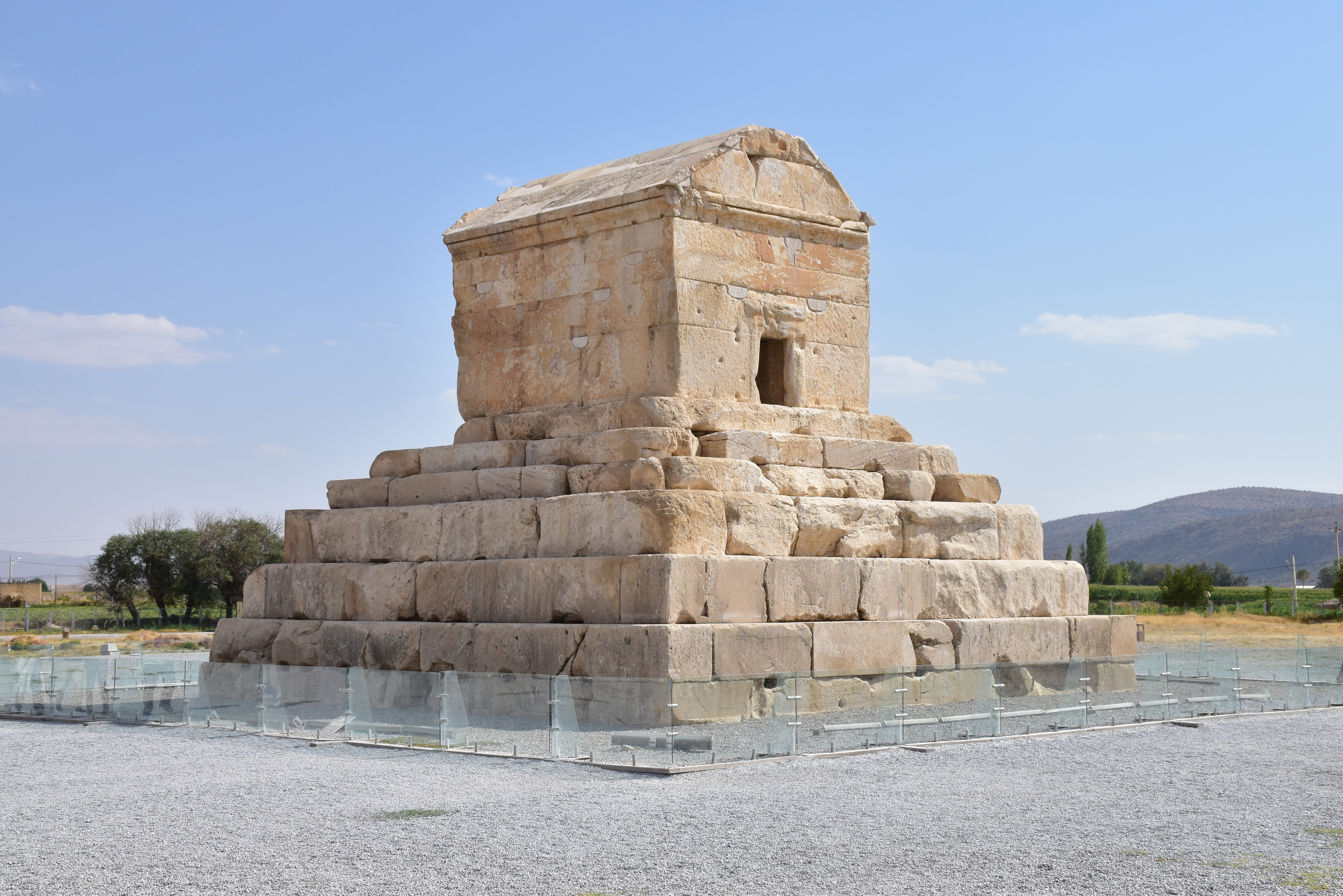
The Tomb of Cyrus the Great at Pasargadae, Iran

Zoroastrianism enters recorded history in the mid-5th century BCE. Herodotus' The Histories (completed c. 440 BCE) includes a description of Greater Iranian society with what may be recognizably Zoroastrian features, including exposure of the dead.

The Histories is a primary source of information on the early period of the Achaemenid era (648–330 BCE), in particular with respect to the role of the Magi. According to Herodotus, the Magi were the sixth tribe of the Medes (until the unification of the Persian empire under Cyrus the Great, all Iranians were referred to as "Mede" or "Mada" by the peoples of the Ancient World) and wielded considerable influence at the courts of the Median emperors.

Following the unification of the Median and Persian empires in 550 BCE, Cyrus the Great and later his son Cambyses II curtailed the powers of the Magi after they had attempted to sow dissent following their loss of influence. In 522 BCE, the Magi revolted and set up a rival claimant to the throne. The usurper, pretending to be Cyrus' younger son Smerdis, took power shortly thereafter. Owing to the despotic rule of Cambyses and his long absence in Egypt, "the whole people, Persians, Medes and all the other nations" acknowledged the usurper, especially as he granted a remission of taxes for three years.

Darius I and later Achaemenid emperors acknowledged their devotion to Ahura Mazda in inscriptions, as attested to several times in the Behistun inscription and appear to have continued the model of coexistence with other religions. Whether Darius was a follower of the teachings of Zoroaster has not been conclusively established as there is no indication of note that worship of Ahura Mazda was exclusively a Zoroastrian practice.

According to later Zoroastrian legend (Denkard and the Book of Arda Viraf), many sacred texts were lost when Alexander the Great's troops invaded Persepolis and subsequently destroyed the royal library there. Diodorus Siculus's Bibliotheca historica, which was completed c. 60 BCE, appears to substantiate this Zoroastrian legend. According to one archaeological examination, the ruins of the palace of Xerxes I bear traces of having been burned. Whether a vast collection of (semi-)religious texts "written on parchment in gold ink", as suggested by the Denkard, actually existed remains a matter of speculation.

Alexander's conquests largely displaced Zoroastrianism with Hellenistic beliefs, though the religion continued to be practiced many centuries following the demise of the Achaemenids in mainland Persia and the core regions of the former Achaemenid Empire, most notably Anatolia, Mesopotamia, and the Caucasus. In the Cappadocian kingdom, whose territory was formerly an Achaemenid possession, Persian colonists, cut off from their co-religionists in Iran proper, continued to practice the faith [Zoroastrianism] of their forefathers; and there Strabo, observing in the first century BCE, records (XV.3.15) that these "fire kindlers" possessed many "holy places of the Persian Gods", as well as fire temples. Strabo further states that these were "noteworthy enclosures; and in their midst there is an altar, on which there is a large quantity of ashes and where the magi keep the fire ever burning." It was not until the end of the Parthian Empire (247 BCE – 224 CE) that Zoroastrianism would receive renewed interest.

=== Late antiquity ===
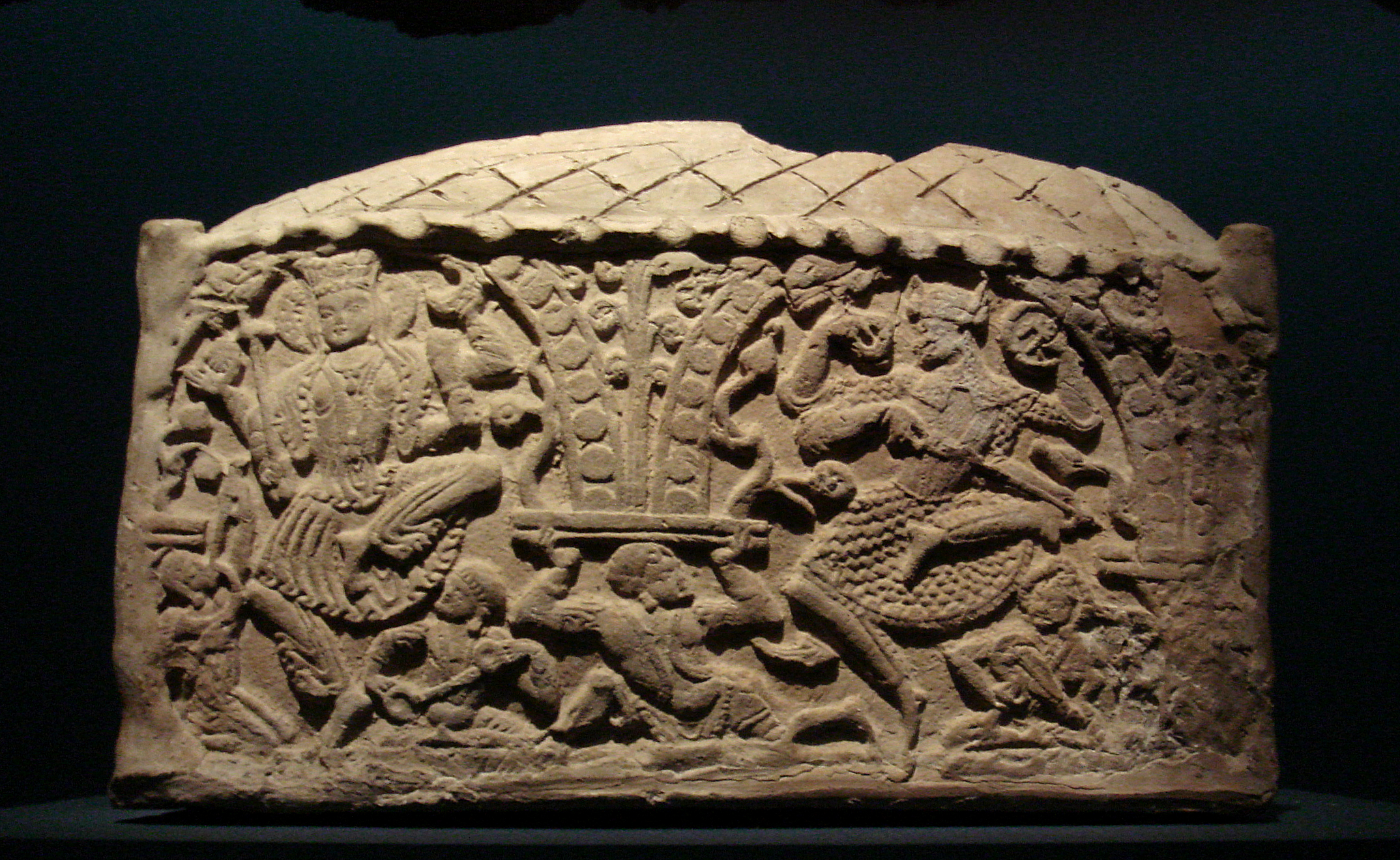
A Zoroastrian ossuary, 7–8th century CE, Hirman Tepe, Uzbekistan.

As late as the Parthian period, a form of Zoroastrianism was without a doubt the dominant religion in the Armenian lands. The Sassanids aggressively promoted the Zurvanite form of Zoroastrianism, often building fire temples in captured territories to promote the religion. During the period of their centuries-long suzerainty over the Caucasus, the Sassanids made attempts to promote Zoroastrianism there with considerable successes.

Due to its ties to the Christian Roman Empire, Persia's archrival since Parthian times, the Sassanids were suspicious of Roman Christianity, and after the reign of Constantine the Great, sometimes persecuted it. In 451 CE, the Sassanid authority clashed with their Armenian subjects in the Battle of Avarayr, making them officially break with the Roman Church. But the Sassanids tolerated or even sometimes favored the Christianity of the Church of the East. The acceptance of Christianity in Georgia (Caucasian Iberia) saw the Zoroastrian religion there slowly but surely decline, but as late the 5th century CE, it was still widely practised as something like a second established religion. The Sasanians enforced a caste system in line with Zoroastrian doctrine. These were:

1. Asronan (priests)
2. Arteshtaran (warriors)
3. Wastaryoshan (commoners)
4. Hutukhshan (artisans)

=== Decline in the Middle Ages ===
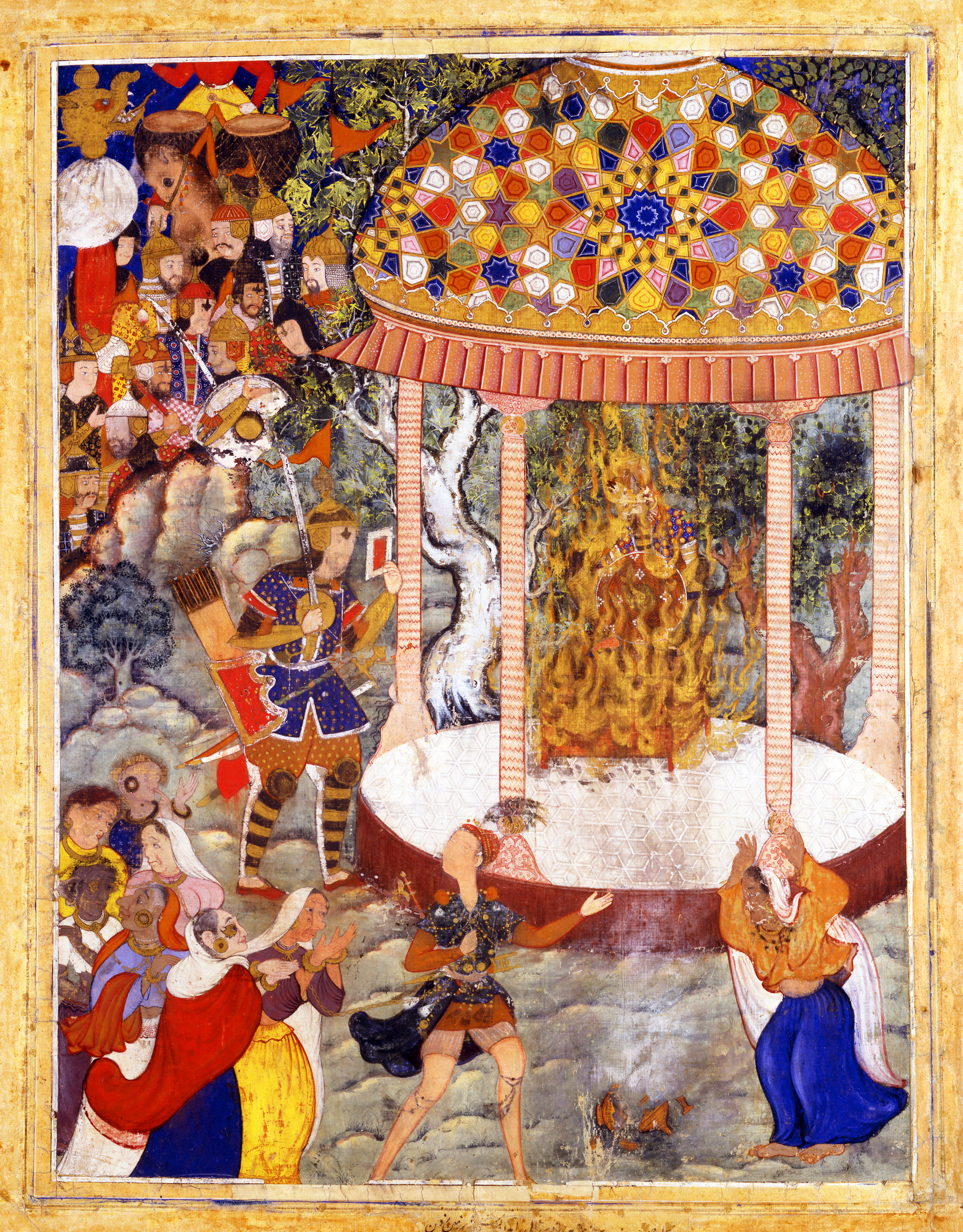
A scene from the Hamzanama where Hamza ibn 'Abd al-Muttalib Burns Zarthust's Chest and Shatters the Urn with his Ashes

Over the course of 22 years during the 7th century, most of the Sasanian Empire was conquered by the emerging Muslim caliphate. Although the administration of the state was rapidly Islamicized and subsumed under the Umayyad Caliphate, in the beginning "there was little serious pressure" exerted on newly subjected people to adopt Islam. Because of their sheer numbers, the conquered Zoroastrians had to be treated as dhimmis (despite doubts of the validity of this identification that persisted down the centuries), which made them eligible for protection. Islamic jurists took the stance that only Muslims could be perfectly moral, but "unbelievers might as well be left to their iniquities, so long as these did not vex their overlords." In the main, once the conquest was over and "local terms were agreed on", the Arab governors protected the local populations in exchange for tribute.

The Arabs adopted the Sasanian tax-system, both the land-tax levied on landowners and the poll-tax levied on individuals, called jizya, a tax levied on non-Muslims (i.e., the dhimmis). In time, this poll-tax came to be used as a means to humble the non-Muslims, and a number of laws and restrictions evolved to emphasize their inferior status. Under the early orthodox caliphs, as long as the non-Muslims paid their taxes and adhered to the dhimmi laws, administrators were enjoined to leave non-Muslims "in their religion and their land".

Under Abbasid rule, Muslim Iranians (who by then were in the majority) in many instances showed severe disregard for and mistreated local Zoroastrians. For example, in the 9th century, a deeply venerated cypress tree in Khorasan (which Parthian-era legend supposed had been planted by Zoroaster himself) was felled for the construction of a palace in Baghdad, 2,000 miles (3,200 km) away. In the 10th century, on the day that a Tower of Silence had been completed at much trouble and expense, a Muslim official contrived to get up onto it, and to call the adhan (the Muslim call to prayer) from its walls. This was turned into a pretext to annex the building.

Ultimately, Muslim scholars like Al-Biruni found few records left of the belief of for instance the Khawarizmians because figures like Qutayba ibn Muslim "extinguished and ruined in every possible way all those who knew how to write and read the Khawarizmi writing, who knew the history of the country and who studied their sciences." As a result, "these things are involved in so much obscurity that it is impossible to obtain an accurate knowledge of the history of the country since the time of Islam..."

==== Conversion ====
Though subject to a new leadership and harassment, the Zoroastrians were able to continue their former ways, although there was a slow but steady social and economic pressure to convert, with the nobility and city-dwellers being the first to do so, while Islam was accepted more slowly among the peasantry and landed gentry. "Power and worldly-advantage" now lay with followers of Islam, and although the "official policy was one of aloof contempt, there were individual Muslims eager to proselytize and ready to use all sorts of means to do so."

In time, a tradition evolved by which Islam was made to appear as a partly Iranian religion. One example of this was a legend that Husayn, son of the fourth caliph Ali and grandson of Islam's prophet Muhammad, had married a captive Sassanid princess named Shahrbanu. This "wholly fictitious figure" was said to have borne Husayn a son, the historical fourth Shi'a imam, who insisted that the caliphate rightly belonged to him and his descendants, and that the Umayyads had wrongfully wrested it from him. The alleged descent from the Sassanid house counterbalanced the Arab nationalism of the Umayyads, and the Iranian national association with a Zoroastrian past was disarmed. Thus, according to scholar Mary Boyce, "it was no longer the Zoroastrians alone who stood for patriotism and loyalty to the past." The "damning indictment" that becoming Muslim was un-Iranian only remained an idiom in Zoroastrian texts.

With Iranian support, the Abbasids overthrew the Umayyads in 750, and in the subsequent caliphate government—that nominally lasted until 1258—Muslim Iranians received marked favour in the new government, both in Iran and at the capital in Baghdad. This mitigated the antagonism between Arabs and Iranians but sharpened the distinction between Muslims and non-Muslims. The Abbasids zealously persecuted heretics, and although this was directed mainly at Muslim sectarians, it also created a harsher climate for non-Muslims.

==== Survival ====
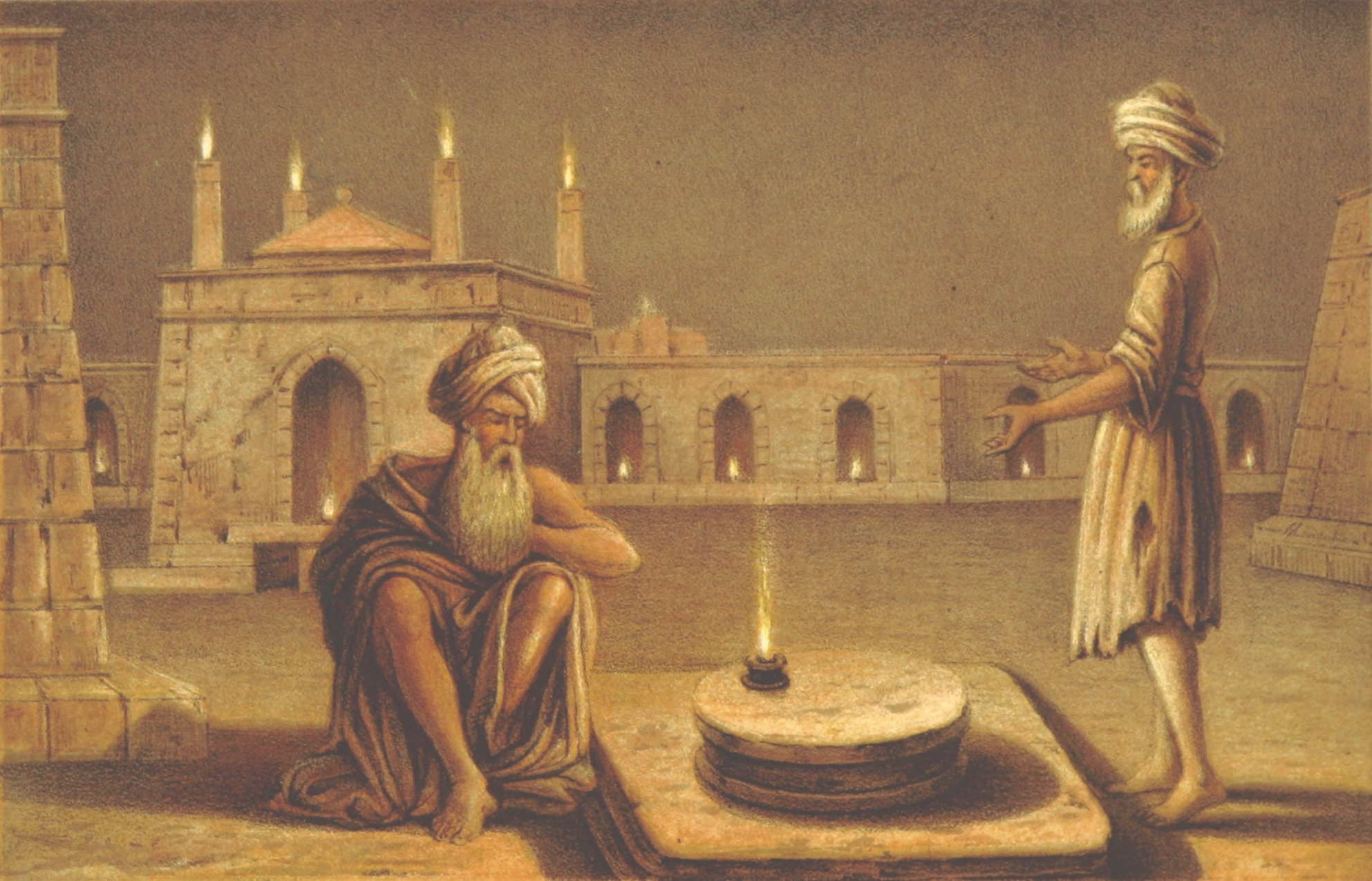
The fire temple of Baku, c. 1860

Despite economic and social incentives to convert, Zoroastrianism remained strong in some regions, particularly in those furthest away from the Caliphate capital at Baghdad. In Bukhara (present-day Uzbekistan), resistance to Islam required the 9th-century Arab commander Qutaiba to convert his province four times. The first three times the citizens reverted to their old religion. Finally, the governor made their religion "difficult for them in every way", turned the local fire temple into a mosque, and encouraged the local population to attend Friday prayers by paying each attendee two dirhams. The cities where Arab governors resided were particularly vulnerable to such pressures, and in these cases the Zoroastrians were left with no choice but to either conform or migrate to regions that had a more amicable administration.

The 9th century came to define the great number of Zoroastrian texts that were composed or re-written during the 8th to 10th centuries (excluding copying and lesser amendments, which continued for some time thereafter). All of these works are in the Middle Persian dialect of that period (free of Arabic words) and written in the difficult Pahlavi script (hence the adoption of the term "Pahlavi" as the name of the variant of the language, and of the genre, of those Zoroastrian books). If read aloud, these books would still have been intelligible to the laity. Many of these texts are responses to the tribulations of the time, and all of them include exhortations to stand fast in their religious beliefs.

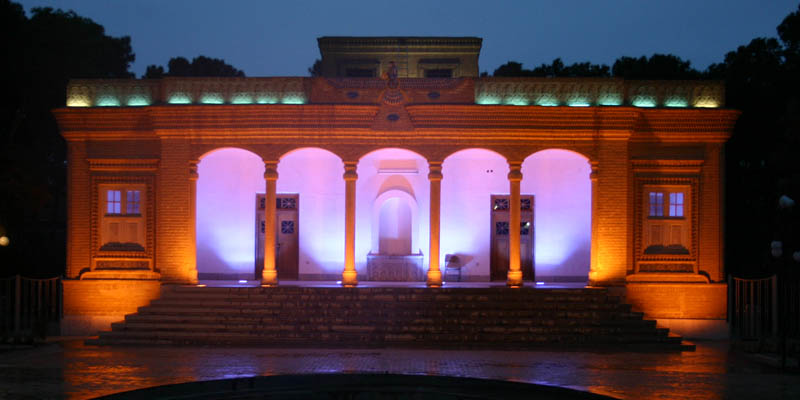
Fire Temple of Yazd

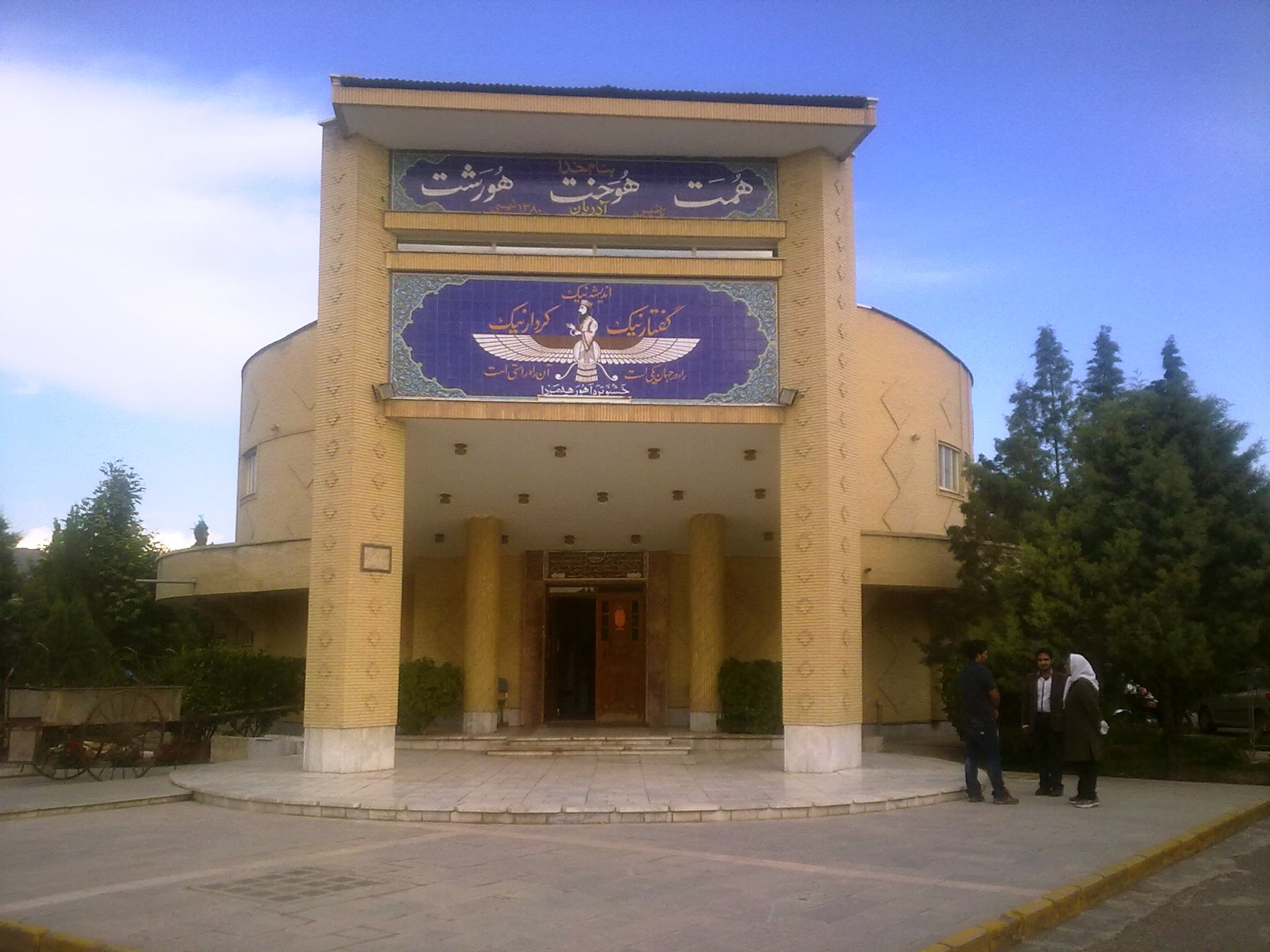
Museum of Zoroastrians in Kerman

In Khorasan in northeastern Iran, a 10th-century Iranian nobleman brought together four Zoroastrian priests to transcribe a Sassanid-era Middle Persian work titled Book of the Lord (Khwaday Namag) from Pahlavi script into Arabic script. This transcription, which remained in Middle Persian prose (an Arabic version, by al-Muqaffa, also exists), was completed in 957 and subsequently became the basis for Firdausi's Book of Kings. It became enormously popular among both Zoroastrians and Muslims, and also served to propagate the Sassanid justification for overthrowing the Arsacids.

Among migrations were those to cities in (or on the margins of) the great salt deserts, in particular to Yazd and Kerman, which remain centres of Iranian Zoroastrianism to this day. Yazd became the seat of the Iranian high priests during Mongol Ilkhanate rule, when the "best hope for survival [for a non-Muslim] was to be inconspicuous." Crucial to the present-day survival of Zoroastrianism was a migration from the northeastern Iranian town of "Sanjan in south-western Khorasan", to Gujarat, in western India. The descendants of that group are today known as the Parsis—"as the Gujaratis, from long tradition, called anyone from Iran"—who today represent the larger of the two groups of Zoroastrians in India.

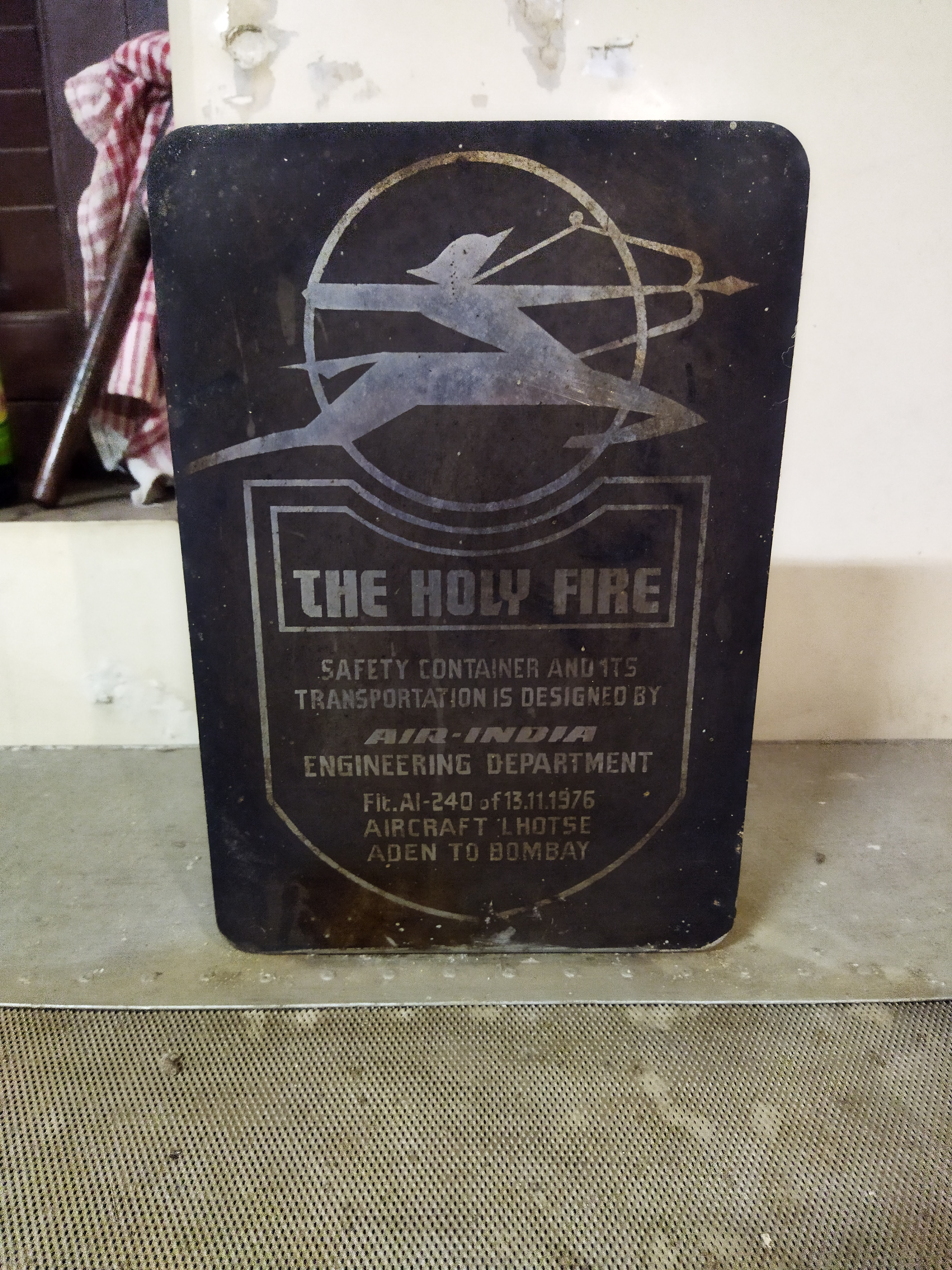
A special container carrying the holy fire from Aden to the Lonavala Agiary, India

The struggle between Zoroastrianism and Islam declined in the 10th and 11th centuries. Local Iranian dynasties, "all vigorously Muslim," had emerged as largely independent vassals of the Caliphs. In the 16th century, in one of the early letters between Iranian Zoroastrians and their co-religionists in India, the priests of Yazd lamented that "no period [in human history], not even that of Alexander, had been more grievous or troublesome for the faithful than 'this millennium of the demon of Wrath'."

=== Modern ===
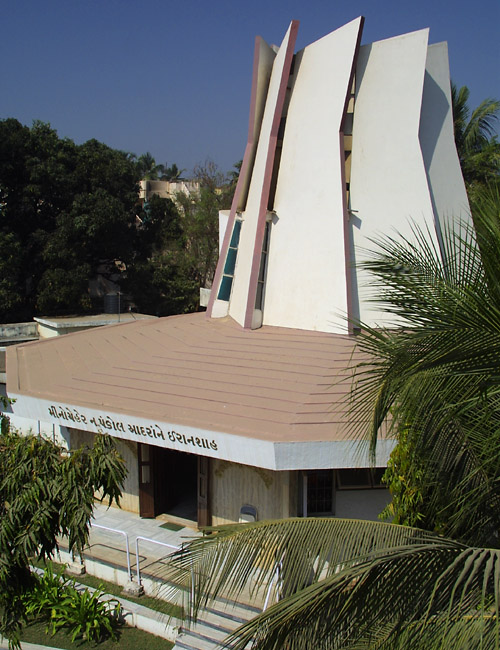
A modern Zoroastrian fire temple in Western India

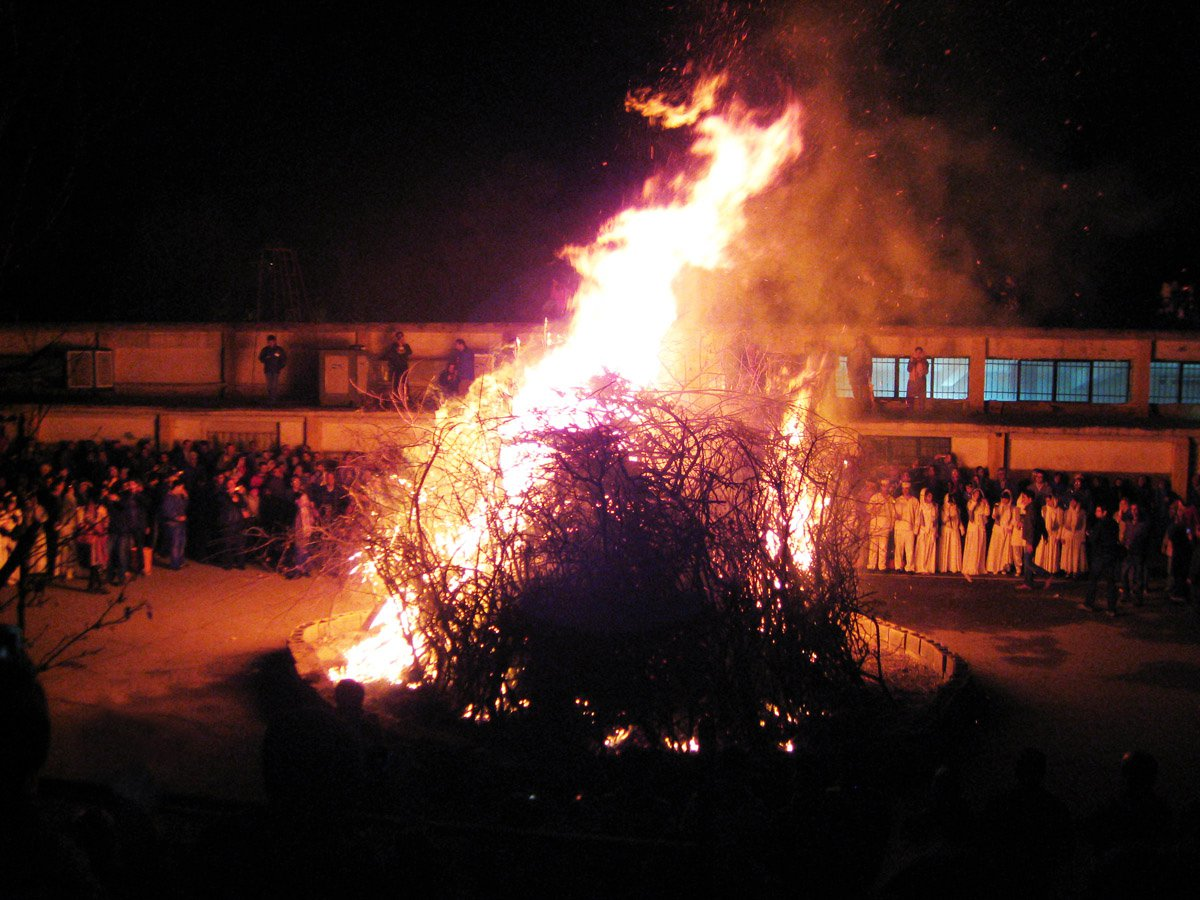
Sadeh in Tehran, 2011

Zoroastrianism has survived into the modern period, particularly in India, where the Parsis are thought to have been present since about the 9th century.

Today Zoroastrianism can be divided in two main schools of thought: reformists and traditionalists. Traditionalists are mostly Parsis and accept, beside the Gathas and Avesta, also the Middle Persian literature and like the reformists mostly developed in their modern form from 19th century developments. They generally do not allow conversion to the faith and, therefore, for someone to be a Zoroastrian they must be born of Zoroastrian parents. Not all Zoroastrians identify with either school. Notable examples gaining traction include Neo-Zoroastrians/Revivalists, which are usually reinterpretations of Zoroastrianism appealing towards Western concerns, and centering the idea of Zoroastrianism as a living religion. These advocate the revival and maintenance of old rituals and prayers while supporting ethical and social progressive reforms. Both of these latter schools tend to centre the Gathas without outright rejecting other texts except the Vendidad.

From the 19th century onward, the Parsis gained a reputation for their education and widespread influence in all aspects of society. They played an instrumental role in the economic development of the region over many decades; several of the best-known business conglomerates of India are run by Parsi-Zoroastrians, including the Tata, Godrej, Wadia families, and others.

For a variety of social and political factors, the Zoroastrians of the Indian subcontinent, namely the Parsis and Iranis, have not engaged in conversion since at least the 18th century. Zoroastrian high priests have historically opined there is no reason to not allow conversion, which is also supported by the Revayats and other scripture, though later priests have condemned these judgements. Within Iran, many of the beleaguered Zoroastrians have been also historically opposed or not practically concerned with the matter of conversion. Currently though, The Council of Tehran Mobeds (the highest ecclesiastical authority within Iran) endorses conversion but conversion from Islam to Zoroastrianism is illegal under the laws of the Islamic Republic of Iran.

Though the Armenians share a rich history affiliated with Zoroastrianism (that eventually declined with the advent of Christianity), reports indicate that there were Zoroastrians in Armenia until the 1920s.

At the request of the government of Tajikistan, UNESCO declared 2003 a year to celebrate the "3,000th anniversary of Zoroastrian culture", with special events throughout the world. In 2011, the Tehran Mobeds Anjuman announced that for the first time in the history of modern Iran and of the modern Zoroastrian communities worldwide, women had been ordained in Iran and North America as mobedyars, meaning women assistant mobeds (Zoroastrian clergy). The women hold official certificates and can perform the lower-rung religious functions and can initiate people into the religion.

The current Zoroastrian population is said be around 100,000 to 200,000 and reportedly declining. However, further studies are needed to confirm this, as numbers have also been rising in some areas, such as Iran.

== Unitarian reform in the Sasanian era ==
The Sasanian era witnessed a feverish theological and political struggle within Zoroastrianism, centred on protecting the original Zoroastrian monotheism and marginalizing extreme dualistic ideas that attempted to equate the One God with demonic forces. This movement was led by the Orthodox Current (the conservative priesthood), represented by an elite group of priests and Mowbedan, to counter what became known as the Zurvanite Heresy (Zurvanism). This philosophical movement claimed that the god of goodness, Ahura Mazda, and the god of evil, Ahriman, were equal twins in power and creation, originating from a common source called "Zurvan" (Infinite Time). The monotheistic orthodox faction viewed this doctrine as a grave theological deviation that shattered the absolute unity of the Creator and violated the core essence of the foundational "Gathas" composed by Zoroaster himself.

The High Priest Kartir (Kartir) emerged in the third century CE as the first and most powerful political and religious architect of this orthodox current. He worked to establish a centralized Zoroastrian state church under the Sasanian state. He left behind famous rock inscriptions, such as those at the Ka'ba-ye Zartosht and Naqsh-e Rajab, in which he explicitly declared a campaign of religious purification and the suppression of dualistic movements and heresies like Manichaeism, stressing the absolute monotheism of Ahura Mazda, adherence to the righteous faith, and belief in judgment and the afterlife.

This intellectual conflict continued until it reached its peak in the sixth century CE, specifically during the Monotheistic Reform under Khosrow I (Anushirvan). King Khosrow I, in cooperation with his high priests, led a sweeping legislative and religious movement to reorganize the state's theological framework following the upheavals of the Mazdakite movement. During this era, the dualistic Zurvanite sect was officially marginalized and expelled from the royal court. Recognition was fully restored to the monotheistic doctrine, which viewed Ahura Mazda as the sole source of existence, while stripping Ahriman of any independent creative attributes and reducing him to a transient destructive force destined for ultimate annihilation.

This strict monotheistic vision and the refutation of dualistic ideas were clearly reflected in the Zend Texts and the commentaries explaining the Avesta written in Middle Persian (Pahlavi), which preserved the late Sasanian theological synthesis, such as the Denkard encyclopedia. These texts contain complex rational arguments deployed by the monotheistic priests to prove the logical fallacy of believing in two co-equal creators. They asserted that evil has no real material substance but is merely a deprivation and absence of good, and that Ahura Mazda is the supreme, unique God transcendent above time and space.

== Demographics ==
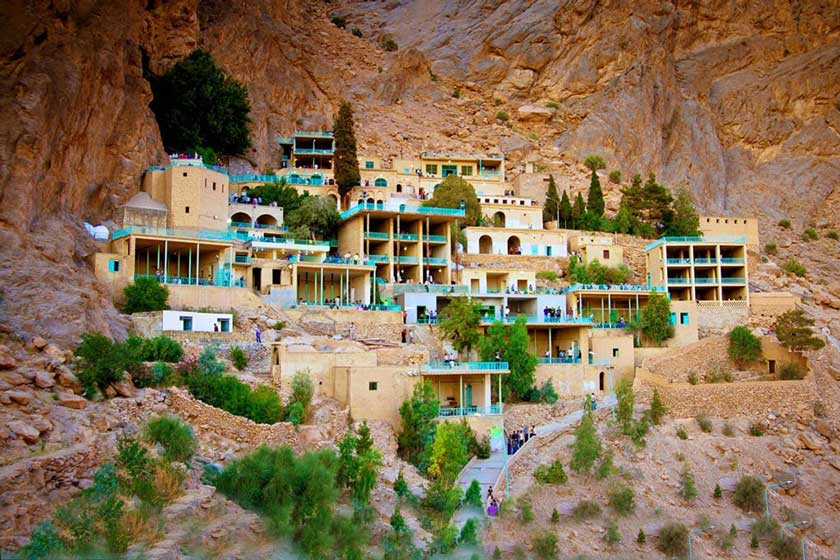
The sacred Zoroastrian pilgrimage shrine of Chak Chak in Yazd, Iran

Historically, the two principal surviving Zoroastrian communities have been the Parsis of India and the Zoroastrians of Iran, although substantial diaspora communities have developed elsewhere.

A worldwide demographic survey conducted by the Federation of Zoroastrian Associations of North America (FEZANA) in 2012 produced two alternative totals for the global Zoroastrian population: 111,691 when an estimate of 15,000 Zoroastrians in Iran was used, and 121,962 when the 2011 Iranian census figure of 25,271 was used. FEZANA cautioned that the compilation was not an official or statistically rigorous census and that the figures could contain inconsistencies or incomplete data. Without including converts, scholars writing for the academic journal, Iran and the Caucasus, estimated there are between 130,000 to 140,000 Zoroastrians worldwide. Some "Iranians in exile" claim that Zoroastrians are undercounted and that, including converts, the number "could be as high as three million." The concept of 'conversion' remains controversial in modern Zoroastrianism.

Estimates for members of the historical Zoroastrian communities in contemporary Iran are much lower than some figures based on religious self-identification. A 2023 study in the Journal for the Scientific Study of Religion summarized recent scholarly estimates as approximately 11,000 to 25,000 Zoroastrians in Iran. By contrast, a 2020 online survey by the Group for Analyzing and Measuring Attitudes in Iran (GAMAAN) based in the Netherlands found that, after weighting, 8% of respondents identified as Zoroastrians. The authors termed the phenomenon "Survey Zoroastrianism" and cautioned that these respondents should not be interpreted as members of Iran's historical Zoroastrian communities or as people necessarily intending to convert; they argued that the responses largely represented alternative religious and cultural identity aspirations.

A 2025 report by the European Union Agency for Asylum similarly noted a lack of precise population figures, citing estimates of approximately 11,000–25,000 Zoroastrians in Iran, with another source giving a figure as high as 50,000. FEZANA's 2012 survey recorded Zoroastrian communities across India, Iran, North America, the United Kingdom, Australia, Pakistan, the Persian Gulf states, New Zealand, Europe and Central Asia, and a number of smaller diaspora communities.

=== Iran, Kurdistan Region of Iraq and Central Asia ===
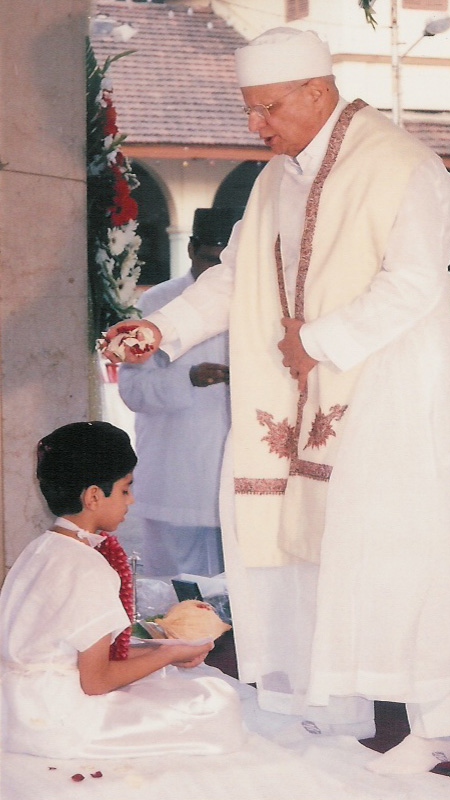
Parsi Navjote ceremony (rites of admission into the Zoroastrian faith)

Iran's figures of Zoroastrians have ranged widely; the last census (1974) before the revolution of 1979 revealed 21,400 Zoroastrians. Some 10,000 adherents remain in the Central Asian regions that were once considered the traditional stronghold of Zoroastrianism, i.e., Bactria (see also Balkh), which is in Northern Afghanistan; Sogdiana; Margiana; and other areas close to Zoroaster's homeland. In Iran, emigration, out-marriage and low birth rates are likewise leading to a decline in the Zoroastrian population. Zoroastrian groups in Iran say their number is approximately 60,000. According to the Iranian census data from 2011 the number of Zoroastrians in Iran was 25,271.

Communities exist in Tehran, as well as in Yazd, Kerman and Kermanshah, where many still speak an Iranian language distinct from the usual Persian. They call their language Dari, not to be confused with the Dari spoken in Afghanistan. Their language is also called Gavri or Behdini, literally "of the Good Religion". Sometimes their language is named for the cities in which it is spoken, such as Yazdi or Kermani. Iranian Zoroastrians were historically called Gabrs.

The number of Kurdish Zoroastrians, along with those of non-ethnic converts, has been estimated differently. The Zoroastrian Representative of the Kurdistan Regional Government in Iraq has reported that as many as 100,000 people in Iraqi Kurdistan have converted to Zoroastrianism recently, with some community leaders speculating that even more Zoroastrians in the region are practicing their faith secretly. However, this has not been confirmed by independent sources. 2024 estimates showed a smaller figure of nearly 5,000 living in the region, primarily in Sulaymaniya Governorate of Iraq.

The surge in Kurdish Muslims converting to Zoroastrianism is largely attributed to disillusionment with Islam after experiencing violence and oppression perpetrated by ISIS in the area.

Additionally, there was a rise of conversions to Zoroastrianism among Bakhtiari Lurs in the 21st century, which was largely attributed to disillusionment with Islam because of the Islamic Republic.

=== South Asia ===
Historical population of Parsis in India
Year	Pop.	±% p.a.
1872	69,476	—
1881	85,397	+2.32%
1891	89,904	+0.52%
1901	94,190	+0.47%
1911	100,096	+0.61%
1921	101,778	+0.17%
1931	109,752	+0.76%
1941	114,890	+0.46%
1971	91,266	−0.76%
1981	71,630	−2.39%
2001	69,601	−0.14%
2011	57,264	−1.93%
2019	69,000	+2.36%

India is considered to be home to a large Zoroastrian population – the descendants of migrants from Iran and today known as the Parsis. In India's 2001 census, the Parsi population numbered at 69,601, representing about 0.006% of the total population of India, with a concentration in and around the city of Mumbai. By 2008, the birth-to-death ratio was 1:5; 200 births per year to 1,000 deaths. India's 2011 census recorded 57,264 Parsi Zoroastrians.

The Zoroastrian population in Pakistan was estimated to number 1,675 people in 2012, mostly living in Sindh (especially Karachi) followed by Khyber Pakhtunkhwa. The National Database and Registration Authority (NADRA) of Pakistan reported that there were 3,650 Parsi voters during the elections in Pakistan in 2013 and 4,235 in 2018. According to the 2023 Pakistani census, there were 2,348 Parsis across the nation, with 1,656 (70.5%) being located in the Karachi Division.

=== Western world ===
North America is thought to be home to 18,000–25,000 Zoroastrians of both South Asian and Iranian backgrounds. As of 2012, the population of Zoroastrians in US was 15,000, making it the third-largest Zoroastrian population in the world after those of India and Iran. According to the 2021 Canadian census, the Zoroastrian Canadian population stood at 7,285, of which 3,630 were Parsis (of South Asian descent) and a further 2,390 of West Asian origin. A further 3,500 live in Australia (mainly in Sydney). Stewart, Hinze & Williams write that 3,000 Kurds have converted to Zoroastrianism in Sweden. According to the 2021 UK census, there were 4,105 Zoroastrians in England and Wales, of which 4,043 were in England. The majority (51%) of these (2,050) were in London, most notably the boroughs of Barnet, Harrow and Westminster. The remaining 49% of English Zoroastrians were scattered relatively evenly throughout the country, with the second and third largest concentrations being Birmingham (72) and Manchester (47). In 2020, Historic England published A Survey of Zoroastrianism Buildings in England with the aim of providing information about buildings that Zoroastrians use in England so that HE can work with communities to enhance and protect those buildings now and in the future. The scoping survey identified four buildings in England.

== Relation to other religions and cultures ==
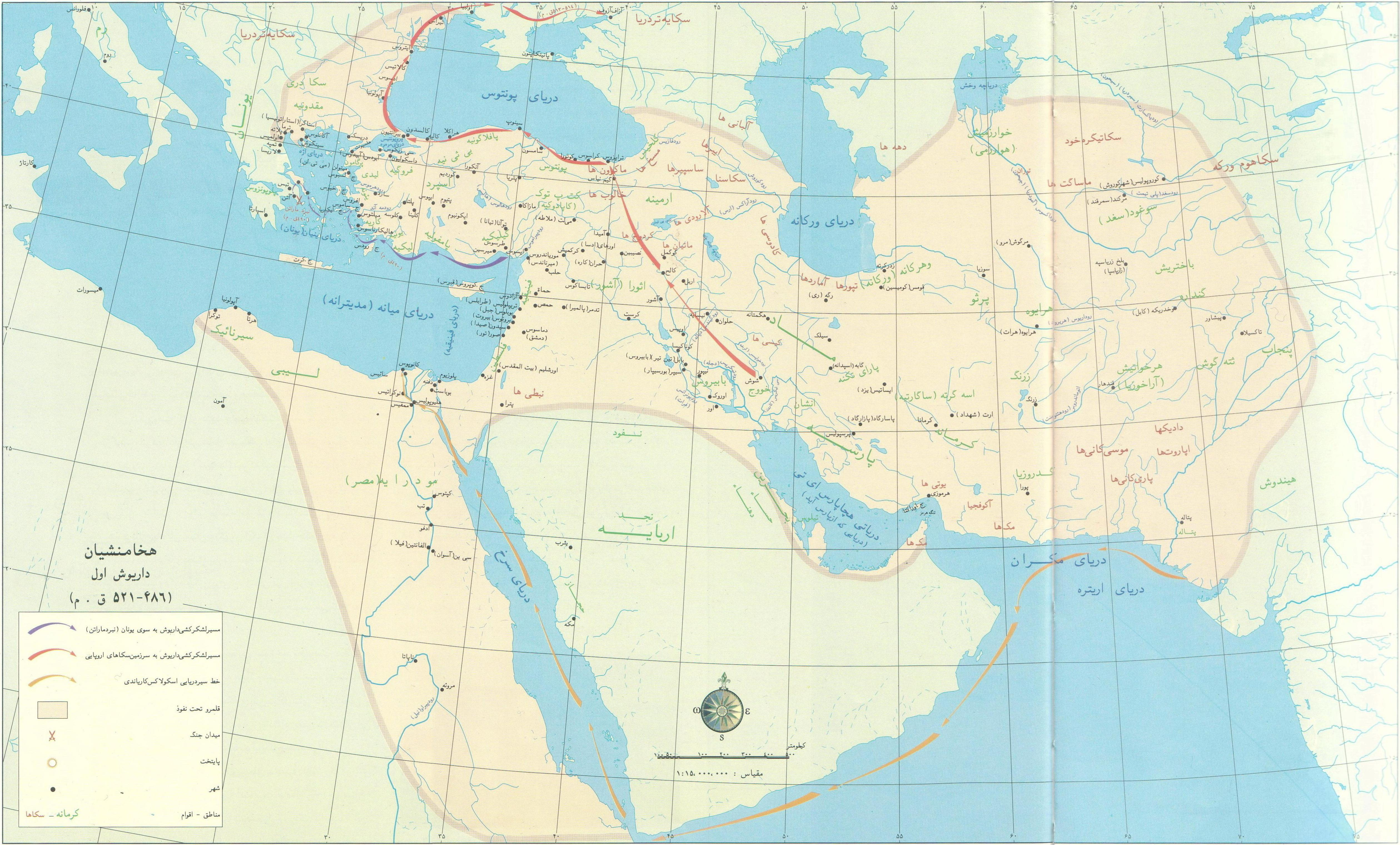
Map of the Achaemenid Empire in the 5th century BCE

=== Indo-Iranian origins ===
The religion of Zoroastrianism is closest to historical Vedic religion to varying degrees. Some historians believe that Zoroastrianism, along with similar philosophical developments in South Asia, were interconnected reformative strings of a common Indo-Aryan thread. Many traits of Zoroastrianism can be traced to prehistoric Indo-Iranian culture and beliefs, before the migrations that separated the Indo-Aryans and Iranic peoples. Thus, Zoroastrianism shares elements with contemporary historical Vedic religion. Some examples include cognates between the Avestan word Ahura ("Ahura Mazda") and the Vedic Sanskrit word Asura ('demon', 'evil demigod'); as well as daeva ("demon") and deva ("god") and they both descend from a common Proto-Indo-Iranian religion.

Zoroastrianism inherited ideas from other belief systems and, like other "practiced" religions, contains syncretism. Specifically, Zoroastrianism in Sogdia, the Kushan Empire, Armenia, China, and other places incorporates local and foreign practices and deities.

Conversely, Zoroastrian influenced Hungarian, Slavic, Ossetian, Turkic and Mongol mythologies, all of which bear extensive light-dark dualisms and possible sun god theonyms related to Hvare-khshaeta.

=== Abrahamic religions ===
Zoroastrianism is sometimes credited with being the first monotheistic religion in history, antedating that of the Israelites and leaving a lasting and profound imprint on Second Temple Judaism and, through it, on later monotheistic religions such as early Christianity and Islam. There are clear commonalities and similarities between Zoroastrianism, Judaism and Christianity, such as: monotheism, dualism (i.e., a robust notion of a Devil—but with a positive appraisal of material creation), symbolism of the divine, heaven(s) and hell(s), angels and demons, eschatology and final judgment, a messianic figure and the idea of a savior, a holy spirit, concern with ritual purity, an idealization of wisdom and righteousness, and other doctrines, symbols, practices, and religious features.

According to Mary Boyce, "Zoroaster was thus the first to teach the doctrines of an individual judgement, Heaven and Hell, the future resurrection of the body, the general last judgement, and life everlasting for the reunited soul and body. These doctrines were to become familiar articles of faith to much of mankind, through borrowing by Judaism, Christianity and Islam; yet it is in Zoroastrianism itself that they have their fullest logical coherence. Since Zoroaster insisted both on the goodness of material creation, and hence of the physical body, and on the unwavering impartiality of divine justice."

The interactions between Judaism and Zoroastrianism resulted in transfer of religious ideas between the two religions and as a result, it is believed that Jews under Achaemenid rule were influenced by Zoroastrian angelology, demonology, eschatology, predestination and resurrection as well as Zoroastrian ideas about compensatory justice in life and after death. It is also postulated that the Jewish high monotheistic concept of God developed during and after the period of the Babylonian captivity, when the Jews had a prolonged exposure to sophisticated Zoroastrian beliefs.

In addition, Zoroastrian concepts seeded dualistic ideas in Jewish eschatology, such as the belief in a savior, the final battle between good and evil, the triumph of good and the resurrection of the dead. These ideas later passed on to Christianity via Zoroastrian-inspired texts of the Hebrew Bible. Jewish and Christian Pseudepigrapha also shows influences, with Persian angelology and demonology influencing Tobit and Jubilees, historical periodization on 2 Baruch and 4 Ezra, dualism in the Testament of the Twelve Patriarchs, and eschatology of 1 Enoch.

According to some sources, such as The Jewish Encyclopedia (1906), there exist many similarities between Zoroastrianism and Judaism. This has led some to propose that key Zoroastrian concepts influenced Judaism. However, other scholars disagree, finding that the general social influence of Zoroastrianism was much more limited, and that no link can be found in Jewish or Christian texts. It has also been proposed that Greek Hellenism was the nexus between them rather than there being a direct influence. The concept of immortality of the soul likely entered Abrahamic religions from Greek thought, while resurrection of the body might have entered from Zoroastrian doctrine.

Proponents of a link cite similarities between the two: such as dualism (good and evil, divine twins Ahura Mazda "God" and Angra Mainyu "Satan"), image of the deity, eschatology, resurrection and final judgment, messianism, revelation of Zoroaster on a mountain with Moses on Mount Sinai, three sons of Fereydun with three sons of Noah, heaven and hell, angelology and demonology, cosmology of six days or periods of creation, and free will, among others. Other scholars diminish or reject such influences, noting that "Zoroastrianism has a unique theistic doctrine which combines dualism, polytheism and pantheism", rather than being a monotheistic religion. Others say "there is little concrete evidence about the precise origin and development of" Zoroastrianism, and that "Zoroastrianism does not compare with the Jewish belief in the sovereignty of God over the whole of creation."

Others, such as Lester L. Grabbe, have said "there is general agreement that Persian religion and tradition had its influence on Judaism over the centuries" and the "question is where this influence was and which of the developments in Judaism can be ascribed to the Iranian side as opposed to the effect of the Greek or other cultures". Marcus Tso also proposed that "The question is not whether or not there were Persian influences, but in what ways and how much" on Judaism. There exist distinctions but also similarities between Zoroastrian and Jewish law regarding marriage and procreation. While Mary Boyce claims, besides Abrahamic religions, Zoroastrian influence also extended to Northern Buddhism.

==== Islam ====
Zoroastrians are considered to be a "People of the Book" by Muslims.

=== Manichaeism ===
The two religions have substantial differences and similarities. Zoroastrianism is often compared with Manichaeism as it was also nominally an Iranian religion, Manichaeism was heavily inspired by Zoroastrianism because of Mani's Iranian origin, and it was also rooted in prior Middle-Eastern Gnostic beliefs.

Manichaeism adopted many of the Yazatas for its own pantheon Gherardo Gnoli, in The Encyclopaedia of Religion, says that "we can assert that Manichaeism has its roots in the Iranian religious tradition and that its relationship to Mazdaism, or Zoroastrianism, is more or less like that of Christianity to Judaism".

=== Present-day Iran ===
Many aspects of Zoroastrianism are present in the culture and mythologies of the peoples of Greater Iran, not least because Zoroastrianism was a dominant influence on the people of the cultural continent for a thousand years. Even after the rise of Islam and the loss of direct influence, Zoroastrianism remained part of the cultural heritage of the Iranian language-speaking world, in part as festivals and customs, but also because Ferdowsi incorporated a number of the figures and stories from the Avesta in his epic Shāhnāme, which is pivotal to Iranian identity. One notable example is the incorporation of the Yazata Sraosha as an angel venerated within Shia Islam in Iran.

In 2016, Zoroastrian Dolly Dastoor was elected to the board of trustees of the Parliament of the World's Religions as the only Zoroastrian on the board. She was co-chair of the Parliament's Women's Task Force, advocating for the role of women within interfaith dialogue. She served as the vice-chair of the Parliament from 2020 to 2021.

== See also ==
- Mandaean cosmology
- Proto-Indo-European mythology
- Zurvan
