= FEZANA =

North American Zoroastrian organization

The Federation of Zoroastrian Associations of North America (FEZANA) is an umbrella organization that represents and unites the Zoroastrian associations in North America. Founded in 1987, its primary goals include promoting the study and understanding of the Zoroastrian religion, culture, and history, as well as facilitating communication and collaboration among its member associations. FEZANA also works to support charitable activities and community development projects within the Zoroastrian community and beyond.

== History ==
In 1986, a conference for North American Zoroastrians was held in Chicago to organize the federation. It was registered as a charitable corporation under Illinois law in 1987.

== Member associations ==
FEZANA comprises several member associations across North America. Some of the notable member associations include:

=== Zoroastrian Association of Quebec (ZAQ) ===
Established in 1967, the 1st association established in Quebec, Canada. It was the precursors to the founding of the Federation of Zoroastrian Associations of North America (FEZANA).

=== Zoroastrian Association of California (ZAC) ===
Established in 1974, ZAC is based in Southern California and is dedicated to the preservation and promotion of the religious, cultural, and social values of Zoroastrianism.

=== Zoroastrian Association of Metropolitan Chicago (ZAMC) ===
Founded in 1975, ZAMC serves the Zoroastrian community in the Chicago metropolitan area, providing religious, cultural, and educational resources for its members. Early Zoroastrians came a students from Asia in the 20th century. In 1983, the first purpose built dahrbe mehr (worship center) in North America was opened by ZMAC.

=== Zoroastrian Association of Greater New York (ZAGNY) ===
Established in 1973, ZAGNY caters to the needs of the Zoroastrian community in the Greater New York area. The association organizes various cultural, social, and religious events for its members.

=== Zoroastrian Association of Houston (ZAH) ===
Founded in 1976, ZAH serves the Zoroastrian community in Houston, Texas, and aims to promote religious and cultural understanding among its members and the wider community. In the 1970s Zoroastrians began arriving to Houston. Originally they worshipped in private residences. The Zoroastrian Association of Houston (ZAH) was established in 1976. The Zarathushti Heritage and Cultural Center, in Southwest Houston opened in the 1990s.

Of the Zoroastrian groups in Houston, as of 2000, the main ones are Iranians and Parsis. As of that year the total number of Iranians in Houston of all religions is, on a 10 to 1 basis, larger than the total Parsi population. As of 2000 within Houston there were about 12 Zoroastrian priests there. Yezdi Rustomji, author of The Zoroastrian Center: An Ancient Faith in Diaspora, stated that they were "variously divided in matters of Zarathushtrian orthodoxy."

As of 2000 the ZAH is majority Parsi. Rustomji wrote that because of that and the historic tensions between the Parsi and Iranian groups, the Iranians in Houston did not become full members of the ZAH. Rustomji stated that Iranian Zoroastrians "attend religious functions sporadically and remain tentative about their ability to fully integrate, culturally and religiously, with Parsis." In 1996 the Iranian population had its largest attendance at a ZAH event when it attended Jashne-e-Sade, an event the community created for ZAH. By 2000 some Muslim Iranians who were opposed to fundamentalism in the mosques began attending Zoroastrian events. Rustomji wrote in 2000 that between 2000 and 2005, Iranians were expected to make up a greater proportion of ZAH.

As of 2016 there were 650 Zoroastrians in Houston. Around that period they had plans to build a fire temple. The fire temple, Bhandara Atash Kadeh in Southwest Houston, opened in 2019. On April 6, 2024, Prince Reza Pahlavi and Princess Yasmine Pahlavi visited the Bhandara Atash Kadeh temple and actively participated in the Yasna ceremony. During his visit, Reza Pahlavi stated "Zoroastrianism is intertwined with Iranian history and civilization. Yasmine and I visited the Zoroastrian fire temple in Houston to honor this indigenous Iranian faith and show solidarity with our Zoroastrian compatriots and the Parsi community. Zoroastrianism, this ancient Iranian faith, has had a critical role in the development and progress of our great civilization. And I am convinced that its influence will only continue to grow as we see among our youth today."

=== Zoroastrian Association of British Columbia (ZABC) ===
Established in 1985, ZABC is based in Vancouver, Canada, and works to foster a sense of community among Zoroastrians in British Columbia.

== FEZANA member associations ==
| Association Name | Address |
|---|---|
| Atlanta Zarathushti Association (AZA) | |
| California Zoroastrian Center (CZC) | |
| Iranian Zoroastrian Association (IZA) | |
| Ontario Zoroastrian Community Foundation (OZCF | |
| Persian Zoroastrian Organization (PZO | |
| Sacramento Zoroastrian Association (SZA | |
| Traditional Mazdayasni Zoroastrian Anjuman (TMZA) | |
| Zoroastrian Association of Alberta (ZAA) | |
| Zoroastrian Association of Arizona (ZAAZ) | |
| Zoroastrian Association of Quebec (ZAQ) | |

== Activities and programs ==
FEZANA undertakes various activities and programs to support its objectives, such as:

- Scholarships: FEZANA provides scholarships to Zoroastrian students in North America for undergraduate, graduate, and professional studies.
- Publications: FEZANA publishes a quarterly journal, "FEZANA Journal," which covers topics related to Zoroastrian religion, culture, history, and contemporary issues.
- Interfaith Relations: FEZANA actively engages in interfaith dialogue and activities to promote understanding, tolerance, and cooperation among different religious communities.
- Youth Programs: FEZANA organizes youth camps, workshops, and leadership programs to empower the younger generation within the Zoroastrian community.
- Charitable and Philanthropic Activities: FEZANA supports various charitable initiatives and community development projects, both within the Zoroastrian community and in the broader society.

== Governance and structure ==
FEZANA is governed by an elected Board of Directors, which comprises the President, Vice President, Secretary, Treasurer, and four Directors. The Board is responsible for overseeing the organization's activities, setting its strategic direction, and ensuring that it adheres to its mission and objectives.

In addition to the Board, FEZANA has several committees and working groups, which focus on specific areas such as education, interfaith relations, public relations, and youth activities. These committees and working groups are composed of volunteers from the Zoroastrian community and work collaboratively to support the organization's initiatives.

== Related pages ==
- Zoroastrian Trust Funds of Europe
- Zoroastrianism
- Parsi
- Zoroastrianism in the United States
