= Ancient Iranian religion =

Ancient Iranian religion was a set of ancient beliefs and practices of the Iranian peoples before the rise of Zoroastrianism. The religion closest to it was the historical Vedic religion that was practiced during the Vedic period. The major deities worshipped were Ahura Mazda and Mithra from Iran to Rome, but Atar was also worshipped, as names of kings and common public showing devotion to these three exist in most cases. Some sects, the precursors of the Magi, also worshipped Ahura Mazda, the chief of the Ahuras. With the rise of Zoroaster and his new, reformatory religion, Ahura Mazda became the principal deity, while the Daevas were relegated to the background. Many of the attributes and commandments of Varuna, called Fahrana in Median times, were later attributed to Ahura Mazda by Zoroaster.

The Iranian peoples emerged as a separate branch of the Indo-Iranians in the 2nd millennium BC, during which they came to dominate the Eurasian Steppe and the Persian Plateau. Their religion is derived from Iranian religions, and therefore shares many similarities with the Vedic religion of India. Although the Persian peoples left little written or material evidence of their religious practices, their religion is possible to reconstruct from scant Iranian, Babylonian and Greek accounts, similarities with Vedic and other Indo-European religions, and material evidence.

Prior to the Achaemenid period, the daivas were also commonly worshipped. The Achaemenid kings made it a state policy to destroy their shrines and vilify them. Old Iranian daiva occurs twice in Xerxes I's daiva inscription (XPh, early 5th century BCE). This trilingual text also includes one reference to a daivadana ("house of the daivas"), generally interpreted to be a reference to a shrine or sanctuary. In his inscription, Xerxes I records that "by the favor of Ahura Mazda I destroyed that establishment of the daivas and I proclaimed, 'The daivas thou shalt not worship!'" This statement has been interpreted either one of two ways. Either the statement is an ideological one and daivas were gods that were to be rejected, or the statement was politically motivated and daivas were gods that were followed by (potential) enemies of the state.

Under the Achaemenids, Ahura Mazda received state patronage as the chief deity and the emperors became his representatives. Ahura Mazda was thus recognized as the creator of the world. Dualism was strongly emphasized and human nature was considered essentially good. The chief ritual of the ancient Iranians was the yasna, in which the deities were praised and the mind-altering drug hauma was consumed. This ritual was performed by a highly trained priestly class. Politics and religion under the Persian empires were strongly connected.

Beginning in the early 10th century BC, the ancient Iranian religions were gradually displaced by Zoroastrianism, which contains some aspects of its predecessor.

== Sources ==
The sources on ancient Iranian religion, though limited, consist of textual and material sources. The textual sources are both Iranian and non-Iranian.

=== Iranian sources ===
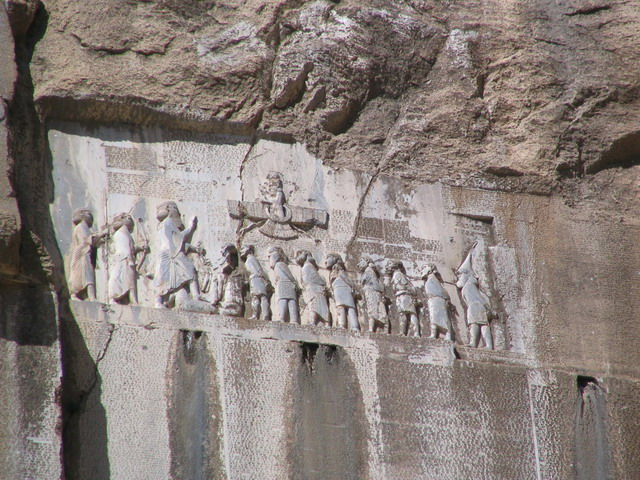
The Behistun Inscription of Darius the Great is an important source on the ancient Iranian religion.

An important Iranian source is the Avesta, which are Zoroastrian sacred scriptures made in the Avestan language. This is considered the principal source of knowledge on ancient Iranian religions. It is a collection of several texts that seems to have been written over a large span of time by a variety of authors. These texts have been subjected to editings and redactions throughout their development. It is now the only extant fragment of what remained in the 9th century CE of the Avesta compiled in the Sasanian Empire by Khosrow I (6th century CE). Summaries of its content reveal that it was a huge collection containing texts not only in Avestan, but also in Pahlavi, which was the language of Zoroastrianism in the Sasanian Empire. Though the existing Avesta is dated quite recently, it contains information that is considerably older. The Gathas ("Songs") of the Prophet Zoroaster, the Yasnas and much of the Yashts are considered among the oldest. The Gathas includes expressions of the religious vision of Zoroaster, which in many ways is a reinterpretation of the ancient Iranian religious principles. The Yashts are a collection of verses dedicated to various deities. These verses are mostly related to Zoroastrian terminology and ideas, but have little relation to anything specifically Zoroastrian. The gods invoked are basically the pre-Zoroastrian gods of the Iranian peoples. There is little agreement on when Zoroaster lived, but most scholars agree that he lived somewhere between 1200 and 600 BC. Dating the Yashts is similarly difficult, but it is likely that they were redacted (not necessarily composed) initially in the 5th century BC.

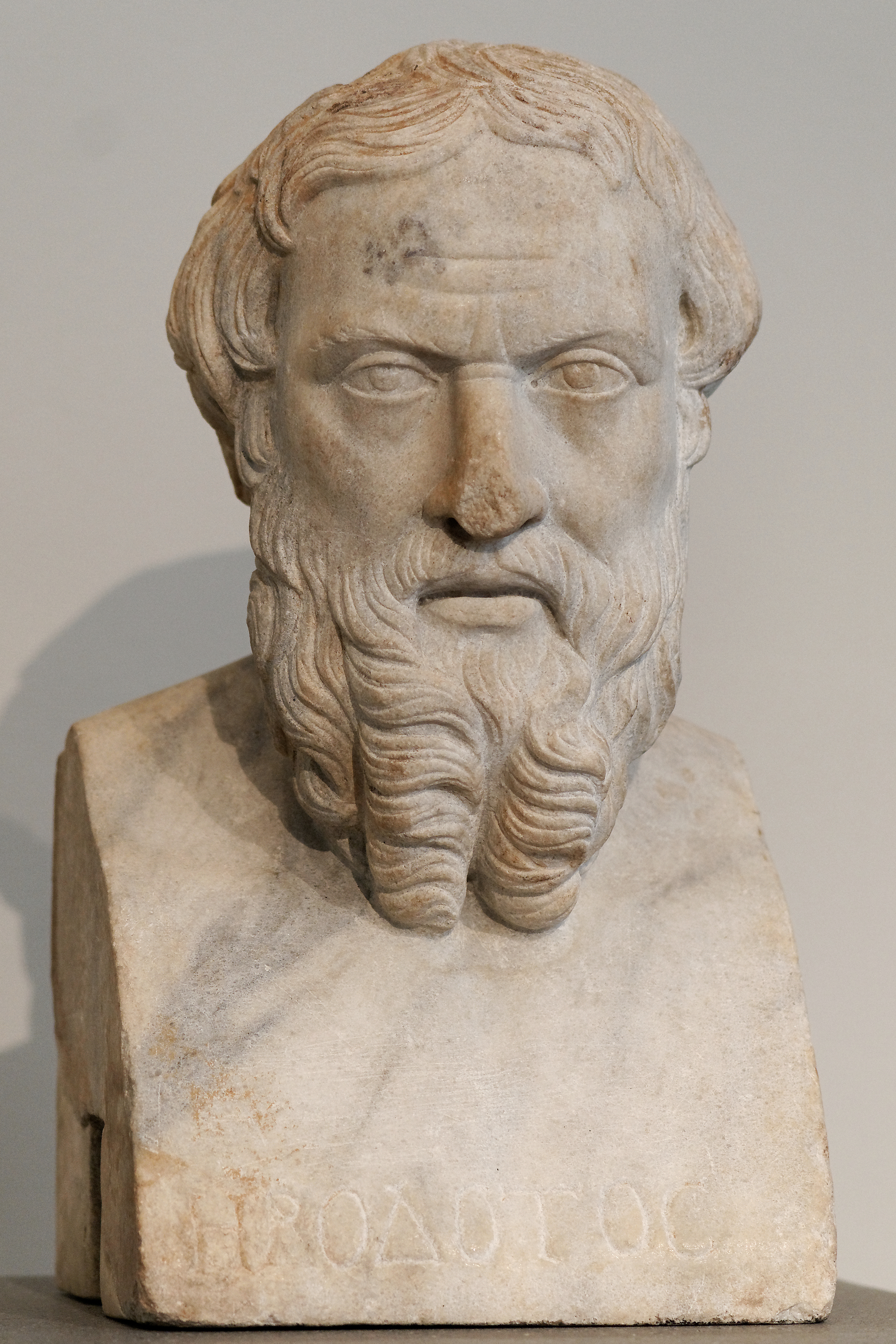
The 5th century BC Greek historian Herodotus is an important source on ancient Iranian religion.

Another Iranian source are royal inscriptions of the Achaemenid Empire made in the Old Persian (with Akkadian, Aramaic and Elamite translations). These inscriptions, in particular those of Darius I and his son Xerxes I, contain many references to religion. The fact that these are fixed in time and place make them particularly useful.

Except from the Achaemenid inscriptions, there is no evidence that the Iranian religious compositions were written until the late Parthian or Sasanian period. This makes ancient Iranian religion the only major religion of the Middle East which has no written texts in the ancient period. The religious information was rather oral both in composition and transmission.

=== Non-Iranian sources ===
The ancient Vedic Sanskrit literature of ancient India, which shares a common ancestor with Proto-Indo-Iranian paganism and predates the first Avestan scriptures by at least a few centuries, is perhaps the most important source. The earliest religious texts of the related Indo-Aryan peoples are indispensable for reconstructing the historical development of the ancient Iranian religion. The most important of these texts in this regard is the Rigveda. It is composed of more than 1,000 hymns dedicated to various deities.

Other non-Iranian sources are mostly Greek. The most important Greek source is Herodotus. Some Greek information on ancient Iranian religion is unreliable, due to being based on outright wrong information or on misunderstandings.

=== Material sources ===
Material sources are rather limited and mostly confined to western Iran. The remains of Achaemenid architecture are the most important of these material sources. They provide a mass of evidence of imperial articulation of religious symbols and indicate a significant dependence on Middle Eastern precedents.

== Origins ==
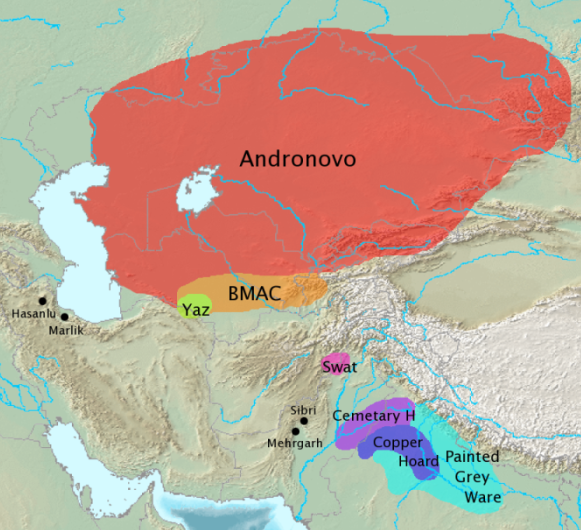
The Andronovo culture, Bactria–Margiana Archaeological Complex, and Yaz culture have been associated with Indo-Iranians.

During the first half of the 2nd millennium BC, one group of Indo-Europeans migrated southwards from Central Asian Steppe into the Iranian plateau and the Indian subcontinent. These are known by scholars as the Indo-Iranians. They eventually branched out into the Indo-Aryan peoples and Iranian peoples. Because of their common origin, Iranian and Indo-Aryan religion is substantially similar. Through a comparative study of both groups one can reconstruct general features of Iranian religion for which there is no direct documentation.

The Iranian peoples were originally seminomadic pastoralists whose main economic base was herds, chiefly cattle but also goats and sheep. They excelled at breeding horses, which they used for riding and pulling chariots in sport and warfare. Exactly how rigid their society was is difficult to determine. The Iranian peoples were specialists in religious matters. Men who could afford chariots and horses were recognized as leaders and warriors.

By the creation of the Achaemenid Empire, a more rigid division of society into priests, nobles, farmers and artisans had developed. Society was heavily patriarchal, which was strongly reflected in religion. As the Iranian peoples settled the land they became more engaged in agriculture and sedentary life. During this process they were influenced by the indigenous populations. The religions of these peoples are completely unknown except from the elements they have left Iranian religion which have no parallel with other Indo-European religions.

== Cosmology ==
=== Cosmography ===
The ancient Iranians believed in a cosmos which was a three-tiered structure. This structure consisted of the earth, the atmosphere, and the heaven above. Beyond heaven was the realm of Endless Lights while below the earth lay the realm of darkness and chaos. The earth rested on a cosmic ocean called the Varu-Karta. In the earth's centre was cosmic mountain Hara. Down the Hara flowed the river Ardvi.

The earth divided into six continents surrounding the central continent. The central continent was Khvaniratha, the locus of Airyanem Vaejah (land of the Aryans).

=== Creation ===
Who is the original father of arta? Who established the paths of the sun and the stars? Who is it through whom the moon now waxes now wanes? Who supports the earth below and (keeps) the heavens (above) from falling down? Who yokes the two steeds to the wind and the clouds?... Who fashioned honoured Devotion together with Dominion? Who made... a son respectful of his father?

— Zoroaster

Ahura Mazda is the creator of heaven and earth. Beside Ahura Mazda is the ancient Indo-Iranian god Thvarshtar ("Artisan"). Thvarstar also appears under the name Spenta Mainyu ("the Beneficient Spirit") in Zoroaster's system of the Beneficent Immortals. In the creative aspect Thvarshtar functions in many ways as Ahura Mazda. In the Younger Avesta Spenta and the Gathas Mainyu is paired with the evil antagonist Angra Mainyu ("the Evil Spirit", Ahriman in Middle Persian). In later sources it is Ohrmazd (Middle Persian for Ahura Mazda) who is paired with Ahriman. The Avesta contains cryptic allusions to the creations of two antagonistic spirits.

It is Plutarch (De Iside et Osiride 47), who conducts the first discursive exposition of world creation by two spirits. Plutarch describes the Persians as telling mythical tales about Oromazes (i.e., Ahura Mazda), who is born from light, and Areimanios (i.e., Ahriman), who is born from gloom, engaging in a war against each other. This dualistic idea of two primordial spirits, which Zoroaster calls twins, is an early Indo-European concept. Reconstruction indicates that primordial twins that existed before the creation of the world, came into conflict. One was named "Man" (Iranian *Manu', meaning "man"), the other was named "Twin" (Iranian Yama, Avestan Yima). After Man killed Yima he used his dismembered body to fashion the world. He used the flesh for the earth, the bones for the mountains, the skull for the sky, etc. In a different Iranian variant of the myth, Yama is the first mortal and the first ruler. His rule is described as a golden age in which there is no hot or cold, no death or old age, etc. When falsehood enters Yama's speech this golden age comes to an end. The Khvarenah "Royal Glory" departs from Yama and seeks refuge in the cosmic sea. Azhi Dahaka "Dahaka the Snake", a serpentine tyrant, then overthrows Yama. His rule ushers in a period of chaos, drought and ruin. Azhi is later defeated by the hero Θraētaona. Θraētaona establishes the legendary line of rulers called the Kayanian dynasty.

== Myths ==
Since all sources on Persian mythology, both from indigenous texts and classical authors, originated after the emergence of Zoroastrianism, it is difficult to distinguish between myths that are Zoroastrian innovations and those that are inherited. The fact that Zoroastrianism was heavily inspired by existing ideas and had adapted from previous Iranian religions makes the distinction difficult to discern. Like other ancient religions, Iranian religions did not have an organized collection of myths. Iranian myths are rather fragments from various stories that exhibit variations on common themes.

There is a variant of the Great Flood myth in Iranian religion. Here Yama appears as the herdsman and leader of mankind. Yama rules the world for a long time, during which the earth is increased threefold due to overcrowding. Ahura Mazda tells Yama that a great winter is on the horizon. He advises Yama to build a large three-story barn-like structure (vara) in order to hold seeds of plants and pairs of animals. It seems that the vara were actually some sort of paradise or blessed island, even though the story at first developed as myth among pastoralists about the culture hero building a first winter cattle station.

Zoroaster appears to have been the first religious figure to develop an eschatological myth about a future saviour to rescue the world from evil. This idea plays an important part in Zoroastrianism. It was probably also influential in introducing the concept of the messiah in exile Judaism.

== Pantheon ==
The Iranian pantheon was similar to that of other Indo-European religions. It contained a large number of deities, primarily male. These deities personified natural phenomena, social norms or institutions. It seems that there were two major groups of deities, the daivas and the ahuras. Daiva, which means "heavenly one", is derived from the common Proto-Indo-European word for "god", which is the meaning it has in the Vedas. Among some Iranians and in Zoroastrianism the daivas were considered demons, but this view was not universal. The ahuras ("lords") were noble sovereign deities. They were contradicted with the bagha ("the one who distributes") and the yazata ("the one who worshipped").

The chief of the pantheon was Ahura Mazda ("wise lord"). He was particularly connected with the principle of social and cosmic order called asha in Avestan. Closely connected to him was the ahura Mithra. Mithra was the god who presided over the covenants. In Iranian religion there were two gods with martial traits similar to those of Vedic Indra, these were Mithra and Vrthraghna. The most prominent female deities were Spanta Aramati, the deity of the earth, and Ardvi Sura, the deity of the sacred river.

=== Ahura Mazda ===
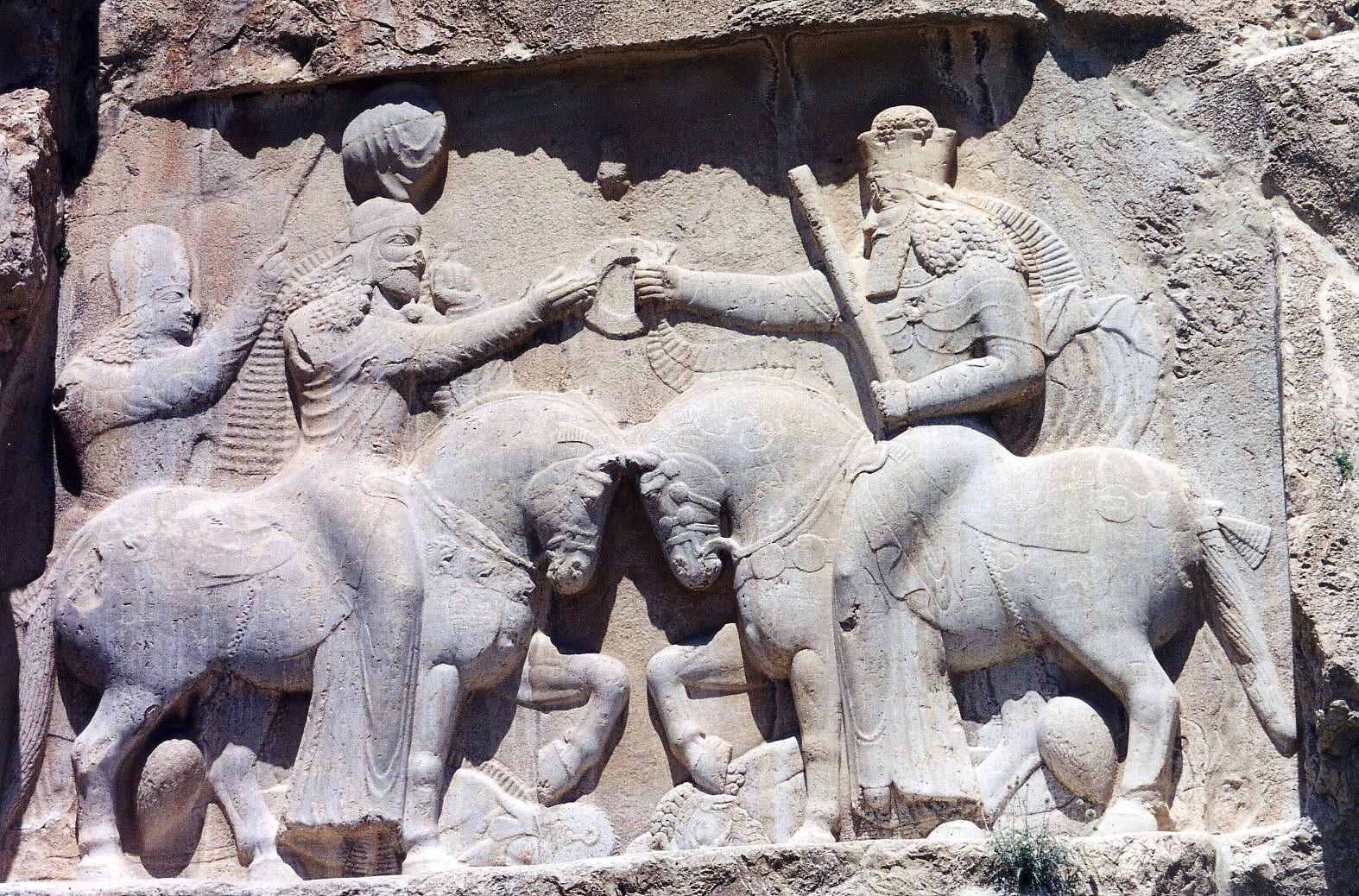
Ahura Mazda (on the right, with high crown) presents Ardashir I (left) with the ring of kingship. (Naqsh-e Rustam, 3rd century CE)

[Ahura Mazda was] the great god... who created this earth, who created yonder heaven, who created man, who created happiness for man, who made Darius king.

— Darius I, Inscription at Naqsh-e Rustam

Ahura Mazda ("Wise Lord") was probably the main god in pantheon of the pre-Zoroastrian Iranians. In the religion of Darius, Xerxes and Zoroaster, he was worshipped as the supreme god to the point that the rest were almost excluded. He is chiefly considered the creator of the universe and the one who maintains cosmic and social order, arta. In his inscriptions, Darius derives his source of authority from Ahura Mazda and makes it clear that political stability and order through law imitates the model set out by the Creator. Through interrogative discourse, an ancient Indo-European poetic device, Zoroaster asks: "Who is the original father of arta? Who established the paths of the sun and the stars? Who is it through whom the moon now waxes now wanes? Who supports the earth below and (keeps) the heavens (above) from falling down? Who yokes the two steeds to the wind and the clouds?... Who fashioned honoured Devotion together with Dominion? Who made... a son respectful of his father?"

Neither the Avesta nor the Achaemenid inscriptions identify Ahura Mazda with a natural phenomenon. In the hymn of the goddess Rti (Reward), Ahura Mazda is identified as her father and Spenta Ariamati (Earth) as her mother. This implies that he has assumed the role of the Indo-European Father Heaven (*Diēus Pater, Vedic Dyaus Pitar), who is paired with Mother Earth. Herodotus apparently makes this identification when stating that Zeus in Persian mythology "is the whole circle of heavens". Zeus is also equated with Oromazes (Ahura Mazda) in other Greek sources. These Greeks made this comparison because of Ahura Mazda's role as father and chief god of the pantheon. His name implies that he was sought by worshippers for his wisdom. Based on the expressions of Darius and Zoroaster, it is reasonable to assume that he was the object of a personal devotion which seems to have been absent with other deities.

=== Mithra ===
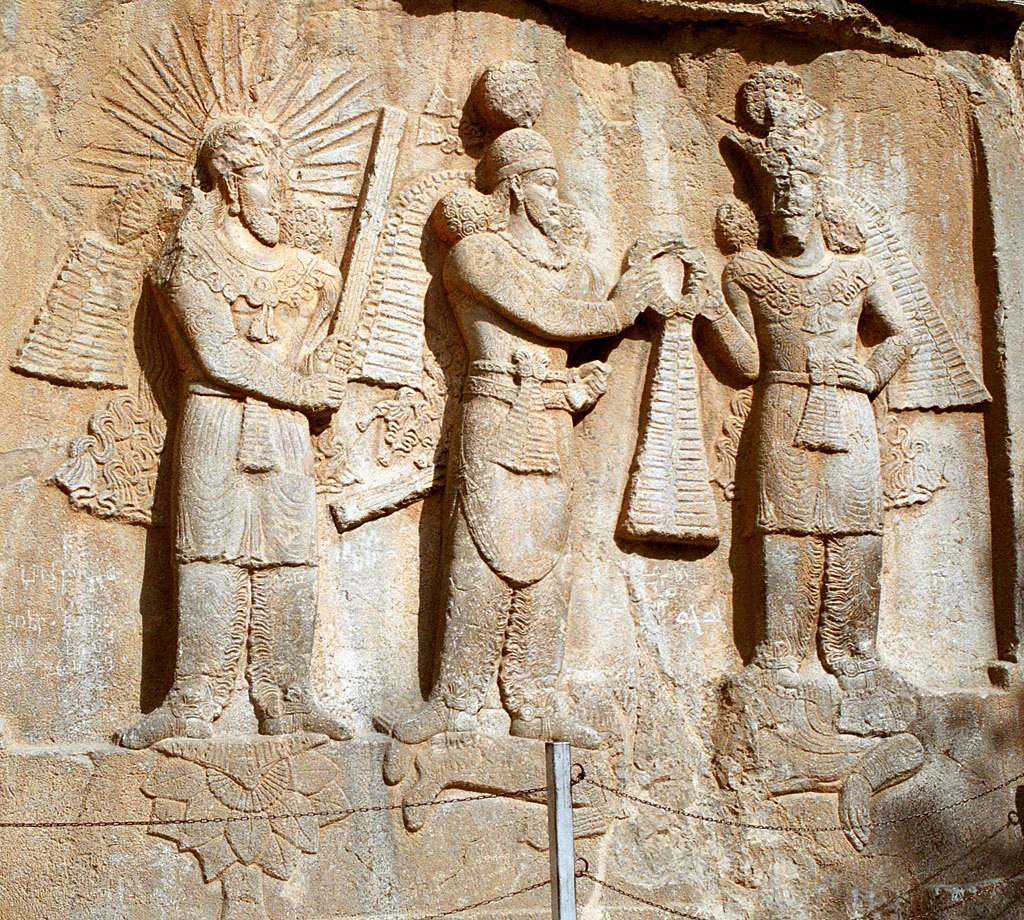
Investiture of Sassanid emperor Ardashir II (3rd century CE bas-relief at Taq-e Bostan, Iran). On the left stands the Mithra with raised barsom, sanctifying the investiture.

Along with Ahura Mazda, Mithra was the most important deity in the ancient Iranian pantheon. He may have occupied a position almost equal to him. In the Achaemenid inscriptions, Mithra is along with Anahita the only deity specifically mentioned.

In the ancient Iranian pantheon there was an individual sun god called Hvar Khshaita. In the eastern Iranian traditions laid out in the Avesta, Mithra also appears to have a connection to the sun, especially with the first rays of sunrise as he drives forward in his chariot. In the western Iranian tradition Mithra was thoroughly associated with the sun and his name became the common word for "sun".

Despite his connection to the sun, Mithra functioned prominently in the ethical sphere. The word Mithra was a common noun meaning "contract, covenant, treaty". Mithra was thus the god of Covenant. In this respect he function as a celestial deity overseeing all solemn agreements made between people. Breaking such agreements was subjected to severe punishment whether the agreement were made between individuals or sociopolitical entities. As a covenant breaker, Mithra is described as sleepless and having 1,000 ears and 10,000 eyes. He is great warrior sporting a mace while driving his chariot into battle. In this capacity he intervenes on behalf of those faithful to treaties by subjecting the treaty breakers (mithra-drug) to panic and defeat.

As an independent deity, Mithra carried the standing epithet varu-gavyuti, which means "one who (presides over) wide pasture lands". Another of his epithets was payu, "protector". He is considered the one who protects the territories of those who worship him and abide by their promises.

Mithra is the god who gave his name to the religion of Mithraism, which was at one point popular throughout the Roman Empire. There is dispute whether Iranian religion is related to the Roman cult of Mithraism. Mithraism was introduced to Romans by Cilician pirates who were in relations with Mithradates VI. This makes it hard to think the connection between Roman and Iranian Mithra is only in the name.

=== Anahiti ===
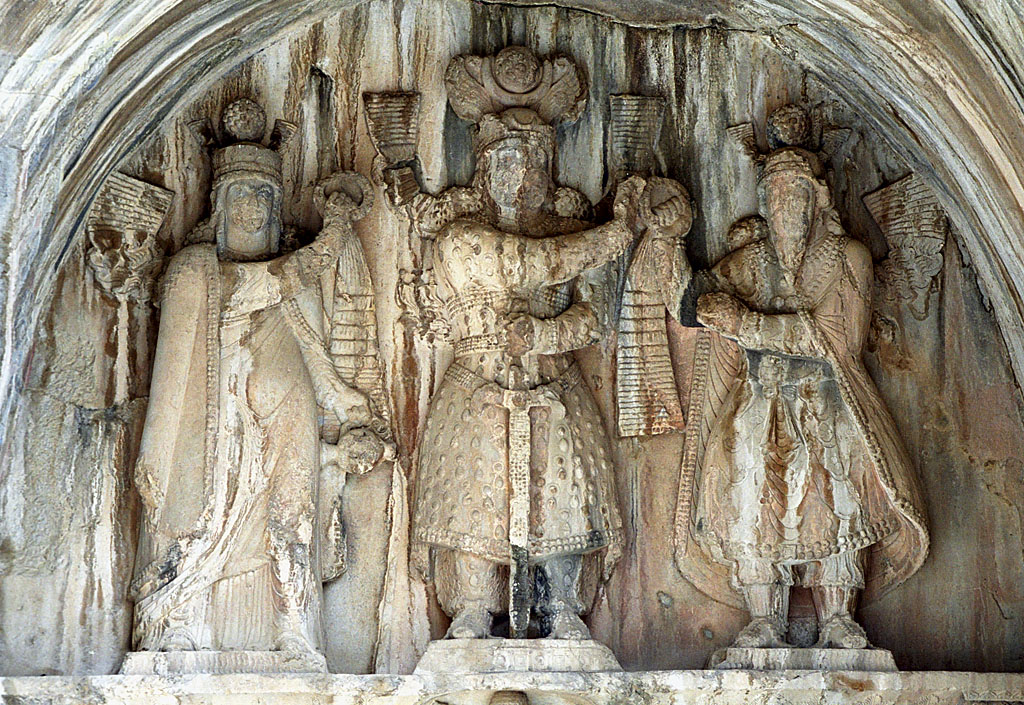
Taq-e Bostan high-relief of the investiture of Khosrow II (r. 590 to 628). The king (center) receives the ring of kingship from Mithra (right). On the left, apparently sanctifying the investiture, stands a female figure generally assumed to be Anahita.

One of the longest of the Avestan Yashts is devoted to a goddess whose name is given as Ardvi Sura Anahita, which means "the damp, strong, untainted". The long name apparently combines two separate names which originally belonged to two individual deities, Ardvi Sura and Anahiti. Ardvi Sura is the Iranian name for the heavenly river goddess who in the Rigveda is called Sarasvati. In this capacity she brings water to the earth, streams, rivers, and seas while flowing from Mount Hukarya to Varu-Karta sea. Anahiti on the other hand is a separate goddess of unknown origin whose cult appears to have been popular originally in northeastern Iran. The name probably meant "untaintedness, purity". Here purity was meant both in moral and physical terms. The Greek Anaitis preserves the original Old Iranian form of this name, while the Old Persian and Avestan Anahit(a) is a more recent linguistic form. In post-Achaemenid Iran Anahiti was closely connected with kingship and the shah.

The Yashts describe Anahita in great detail, unlike any other deity. The descriptions about her clothing and ornamentation are so specific that it is likely the source of the description was a dressed cult image. This fact is confirmed in her mentioning by Artaxerses II. Berossus, a Babylonian historian, notes that the king had several images of her made and distributed. Since the Iranians did not originally make images, it is likely that the cult of Anahiti was inspired by Mesopotamian models. The Mesopotamian goddess Ishtar is a likely candidate in this regard, although Anahiti's dress, in particular her beaver coat, shows major differences. There were also major similarities in their roles. Ishtar was the patroness of the palace and goddess of war. Anahiti is described as a patron of Iranian heroes and legendary rulers and her Yasht is strongly devoted to her martial traits. Both goddesses were important for fertility.

=== Vrthraghna ===
Vrthraghna was the mighty deity of war. He had martial traits are similar to Mithra and the Vedic god of war Indra. In the post-Achaemenid period he was equated with Hercules and became a favourite deity of monarchs, many of whom took his name. His name means "the smashing of resistance or obstruction" or "the slayer of Vṛtrá" i.e. Indra. In his capacity as the god who guaranteed his people to overcome all resistance, his name came to be understood as meaning "Victory".

In connection with rulership and granting victory, he held the epithet bara-khvarnah, which means "Bearing the Glory." Like Mithra he is portrayed as the ideal warrior. For the earliest Iranian invaders of the Iranian plateau, he came to personify aspirations to acquire new territory from the native population. For later Iranians he became the divine manifestation for the will to conquer the world.

In the Iranian pantheon, Vrthraghna was the god who predominantly possessed the ability to undergo transformations, both anthropomorphic and theriomorphic. Though rich mythologies are believed to have existed for these avatars, only 10 forms have been recorded. These are:

[Vrthraghna is a] ferocious wild boar with sharp teeth and tusks, a boar that kills at one blow…who, overtaking his opponent…strikes (him) down with a toss of his head…until he smashes the vertebrae, the pillars of life…(and) mixes on the ground the bones, hair, brains, and blood.

— Description of Vrthraghna as a wild boar
- The Wind (the god Vayu)
- Bull
- Stallion
- Rutting camel
- Wild boar
- 15-year-old male (this was considered the ideal age)
- Falcon
- Ram
- Goat
- Hero

The avatars of Vrthraghna all had a fellow aggressiveness and virility. In some violence is conspicuous. Descriptions of these avatars can be particularly graphic.

=== Rashnu ===
Rashnu was an ethical deity, a divine judge who presided over the legal disputes of humans. He was often associated with Mithra. The name of Rashnu is derived from the Indo-European verb, *reg ("to be, make straight, direct, judge"). In particular he seems to have been the god of oaths and ordeals administered in trials. In several ways he was responsible for the same judicial functions as the Vedic god Varuna, who was the ultimate judge presiding over oaths, often inseparable from the Vedic Mitra.

While it is uncertain whether Ahura Mazda had any judicial responsibilities, Rashnu and Mithra were connected with two separate areas of law. While Mithra was concerned with covenants, Rashnu mainly had jurisdiction of legal matters, in particular those of criminal nature. He was invoked as the god who "best smite(s), who best destroy(s) the thief and the bandit at this trial."

=== Tishtrya and Tiri ===
Astral deities figured more prominently in ancient Iranian religion than Vedic religion. This may be explained with the influence of Babylonian science on the Iranians, in particular the western groups. In the Avesta stars and constellations such as Ursa Major, the Pleiades, Vega, Fomalhaut and the Milky Way are mentioned. The most important astral deities seem to have been Tiri and Tishtrya.

For reasons that are unknown, Tishtrya is associated with the star Sirius in one Yasht that is entirely devoted to her. Though the heliacal rising of Sirius is assumed to have occurred during the season of drought, his chief myth concerns a battle between him and the demonic star Apausha ("Nonprosperity") over rainfall and water. In a battle taking place along the shores of Varu-Karta, Tishtrya and Apausha battled each other while assuming the forms of a white stallion and an ugly horse. Though Apausha is initially victorious, Tishtrya eventually prevails after receiving worship, driving Apausha "along a path the length of a race course." This combat was reenacted by the Iranians in a yearly equestrian ritual. After assuming victory Tishtrya causes the cosmic sea to boil and surge. Then another star, Satavaisa (Formelhaut), arises with cloud-forming mists. These mists are blown by the wind in the form of "rain and clouds and hail to the dwelling and the settlements (and) to the seven continents."

Tishtrya was considered to contain the seeds of waters and was thus closely connected with agriculture. He defeated shooting stars identified as witches, in particular one named "Bad Crop" (Duzhyāryā). In Zoroastrianism Tishrya was in late Achaemenid times identified with the western Astral deity Tiri (Mercury in Sassanid astronomy). Little is known about Tiri except from the highly important agricultural festival, the Tiragan. The fourth month, (Tir, Avestan Tishtryaeninis), and the 13th day (Tir) of the Zoroastrian calendar, bears this name.

== Practices ==
In sharp contrast to other people of the Middle East, but similar to their Vedic relatives in India, the Iranians neither made images of their deities nor built temples to house them. They preferred to worship their gods in the open. The ancient Iranians practiced a sacrificial ritual yazna. In this ritual fire and the sacred drink hauma played a key part. The chief officiant at this sacrifice was the zautar.

=== Yazna ===
Worship was mainly performed through the central ritual yazna. This ritual corresponds in many regards with the Vedic yajna. Despite changes undergone through the millennia, these rituals are still performed by Zoroastrians and Hindus. It is probably the oldest continuously enacted ritual in the world. As far as yazna can be reconstructed, it was basically a highly elaborate festive meal offered to a guest. In this ritual the sacrificer was the host and the deity the guest. While yazna is a daily ritual in Zoroastrianism, its frequency among the early Iranians is not precisely known. Yazna was held to enter into communion with the divine. This was either for a specific purpose, for example to secure victory in war, to express piety or to secure general welfare. Yazna followed the general rules of hospitality. A guest was sent by invitation. Upon arrival he received a warm greeting and was shown to a comfortable seat. There he was given meat and drink while entertained with songs praising his deeds and virtues. The guest was expected to return the hospitality with a gift.

The seat provided for the gods invited to yazna originally consisted of special grasses spread on the ground in front of the altar. In Vedic terminology this was called the barhish (Avestan barzish, "cushion"). The Avestan word barəsman (Iranian barzman), used in Zoroastrianism, is a cognate of this word. It is used for a bundle of sticks, later thin metal rods, that are manipulated by priests.

Of bigger importance than the offering of meat was the preparation of the divine drink hauma. Like fire, hauma was considered both sacred and as a deity. The most important part of yazna was probably the preparation of hauma. Despite numerous proposals, the plant whose juices were extracted to prepare hauma has not been identified. The word hauma is derived from a verb "to press, extract". It thus literally means the juice which has been pressed out of the whatever plant that has been used. While making hauma the stalks were first soaked in water and then pounded. While Zoroastrians did this with metal mortar and pestle, the early Iranians pounded the stalks between two pressing stones. The juice was filtered and mixed with milk to reduce the bitter taste. It was also possibly mixed with water. Hauma was described as yellow. The drink was then consumed immediately. Though it was not alcoholic it was rather a mind-altering drug. According to the Yasht to Hauma: "All other intoxicants are accompanied by Wrath with the horrible club, but that intoxication which is Hauma's is accompanied by gladdening Truth (arta)." This minor statement can be extended with more informative descriptions in the Rigveda. In the Rigveda soma was not only offered to gods, but also consumed by poets to increase their power in their search for truth. Hauma was also drunk as a stimulant by warriors before going into battle. Many heroes of Iranian mythology are remembered for having practiced this cult.

It is probable that yasna from a very early period was carried out by a priest, the zautar (Vedic hotar). The zautar was probably assisted by several other ritual specialists. With the priests acting through the sacrificer, the gods were invoked through fire. When the god arrived he was placed at the barzman, served parts of the slaughtered victim as food, served a drink and entertained with song. In turn the sacrificer would request a gift, usually in the form of heroic songs, good health or victory. In many ways the ritual can be compared with the old Latin dictum do ut des ("I give so that you may give"), in the sense that it was meant to provide a means of inducing the deities to act in favor of humans. In addition it made a communion between the divine and human realms possible. Deities could also be addressed directly through prayer. In this case the supplicant would be standing erect with upraised arms. Prostration was not known.

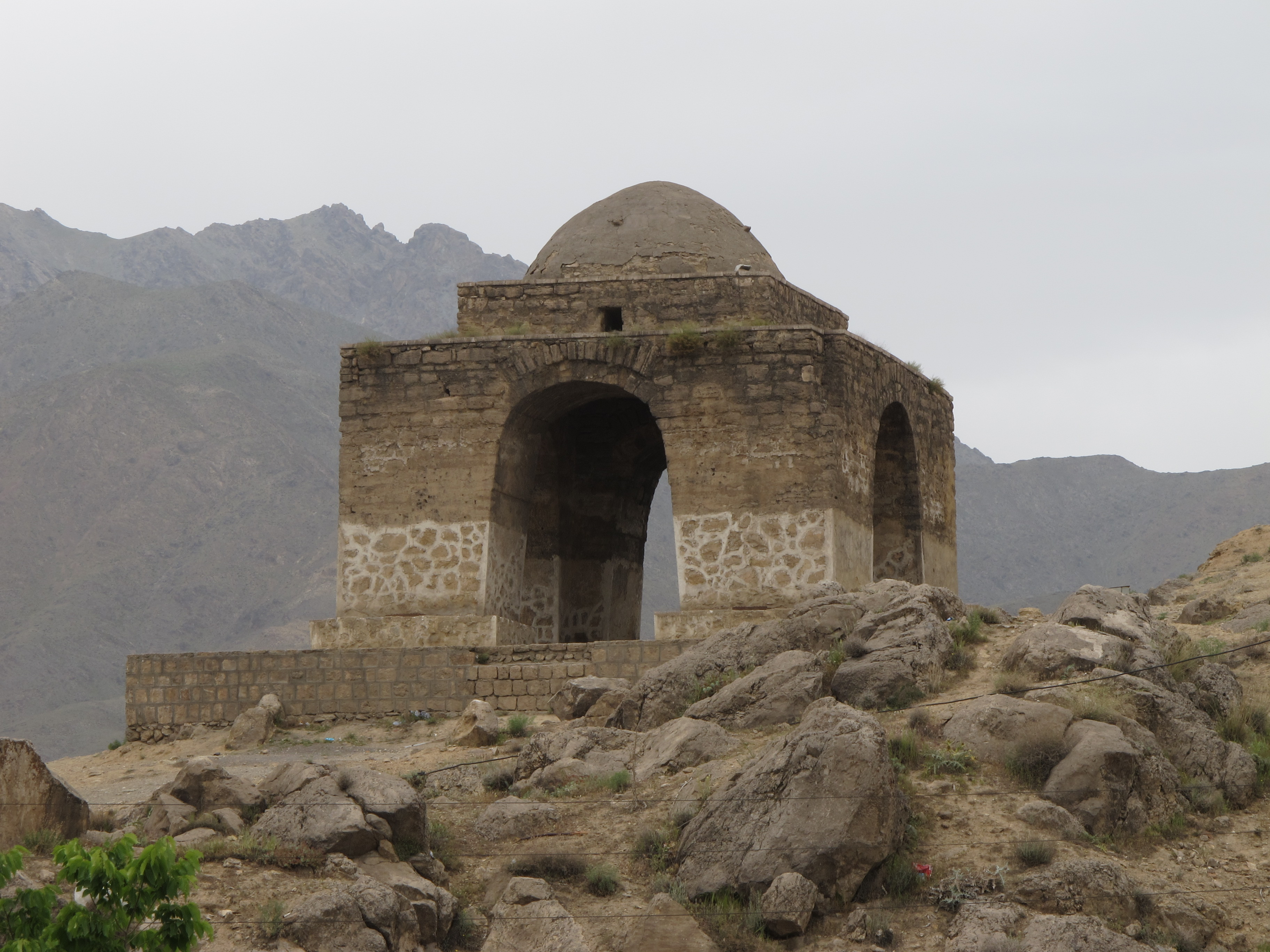
Fire temple of the early Parthian or Sasanian period in Kashan, Iran

=== Fire ===
Fire was of supreme importance in Iranian rituals. In ancient Iran, fire was considered a deity and highly sacred element. As a result, Atar was denoted both "fire god" and "Fire". Every instance of fire was considered a manifestation of a deity. Because burned offerings were not made, Atar's role was mainly that of an intermediary between heaven and earth and between humans and gods. This is similar to his Vedic counterpart Agni. Beyond yazna, fire was carefully treated as a sacred element. Whether in households, or later, in fire temples, fire was maintained with proper fuel, protected from polluting agents, and most importantly never extinguished.

=== Songs ===
The song of praise to the divine guest was of major importance. Almost all of the Rigveda and much of the poetic portions of the Avesta must be understood in this context. This means that the ancient poetry of the Indo-Iranians was religious in nature and composed specifically for ritual occasions in which gods required songs of praise in order to make them well disposed towards those who worshipped them.

The obscure parts of many Vedic hymns and Zoroaster's Gathas can best be understood through realizing that the intended audience were the gods rather than humans.

=== Festivals ===
The Iranians celebrated various festivals throughout the year. These were mostly related to agricultural and herding cycles. The most important of these was that of New Year, which is still celebrated by Iranian peoples.

== Philosophy ==
=== Dualism ===
Like with other ancient religions, the cosmological dichotomy of chaos and cosmos played an important part of both myth and worldview. The most important and unique aspect of ancient Iranian religion was the development of dualism. This was mainly expressed in opposition between truth (arta) and falsehood (drug, drauga). While originally confined to the conflict between social order and social disorder, this dualistic worldview came to affect all aspects of life. The pantheon became divided between gods and demons. Under the influence of the Magi, who were members of a priestly Median tribe, the animal kingdom became divided into two classes. There were beneficent animals and noxious creatures.

Dualism even permeated the vocabulary: "ahuric" and "daivic" words for developed for such things as body parts. For example, the word zasta and gava became used for the hands of a righteous and evil person, respectively. This was however not a gnostic system like the ones that flourished in the Middle East in the Common Era. This was because there was no myth of evil being created through the corruption of a spiritual being.

=== Human nature ===
In the Zoroastrian myth of creation, humans are created for the purpose of repulsing the Evil Spirit. Although it is uncertain whether this is a pre-Zoroastrian concept, it shows in that in Iranian religion human nature was considered essentially good. This is contrary to the myths about the baseness of human condition found in Babylonian mythology, for example in Enûma Eliš. In Iranian religious thought humans had free will and were able for determine their own destinies through their ethical choices.

In addition to the body (tanu), an individual was believed to consist of a number of spiritual elements that basically fall under the category of souls. These were:

- The animating force (ahu)
- The breath of life (vyana)
- Mind or spirit (manah)
- The soul (ruvan, Avestan urvan)
- The protective spirit (fravarti; Avestan fravashi)
- The spiritual double (daina; Avestan daena)

In Zoroastrianism, belief in the Day of Judgement was a central aspect. Zoroastrianism considers the ruvan to be accountable for a person's actions in life. It is therefore the ruvan which receives reward or punishment in the afterlife. At the time of judgement, the ruvan is encountered by the daina. The daina embodies the sums of a person's deeds in life, and is manifested as either a beautiful maiden or an ugly old woman. Depending on how the person's deeds are weighed, the soul is either crossed safely across the Cinvat Bridge to the other world or descends into the abyss.

The fravarti is a deity which functions as a protective spirit for an individual. It is also an ancestor spirit. The fravartis constitute a warrior band, quite similar to the Vedic Maruts.

=== Politics ===
Apart from the legendary kings of eastern Iran, the Kavis, of whom Zoroaster's patron Vishtaspa (Hystapes) was the last, the only historical information about the relationship between religious and political authority come from the Achaemeneid period in western Iran. The ideology of kingship was closely connected to Ahura Mazda, the supreme deity. The kings ruled through his will. Achaemenid kings were compelled to contend with the Median priests, known as magi. The origin of the magi is unclear. According to classical sources they were responsible for presiding over religious ceremonies and chanting "theogonies".

The magi were also deeply involved in politics. This can be seen by the attempt of the magus Gaumata to usurp the throne after the death of Cambyses II. Darius persecuted the magi, but they were able to preserve their power and eventually become the official priesthood of the Achaemenid Empire. The magi were probably responsible with introducing dualist ideology and enforcing zealous preoccupation with ritual purity in Zoroastrianism. They are also famous throughout the ancient world for their ability to perform magic.

== See also ==
- Iranian religions
- Scythian religion

== Sources ==
- Herrenschmidt, Clarisse; Kellens, Jean (1993), "*Daiva", Encyclopaedia Iranica, vol. 6, Costa Mesa: Mazda, pp. 599–602
- Kent, Roland G (1937), "The Daiva-Inscription of Xerxes", Language, 13 (4): 292–305, doi:10.2307/409334, JSTOR 409334
- Malendra, William W. (1983). An Introduction to Ancient Iranian Religion: Readings from the Avesta and Achaemenid Inscriptions. U of Minnesota Press. ISBN 0816611149.
