= Hadhayosh =

Land creature from ancient Persian mythology

Hadhayosh (also spelled Hadayōš, Hadhyaš, or Hadhayos; also known as Srisōg, Srisōk, or Srishok) is a primordial bull in Zoroastrian mythology. It appears in Middle Persian literature, particularly the Bundahišn, where it is associated with travel between the seven regions of the world, and the final renovation of the universe. According to the Bundahišn, people travelled between regions on its back, and its fat was to be used in preparing the elixir of immortality at the end of the world.

== Name and sources ==
The bull's name appears in several forms in Middle Persian texts and modern translations. In the translation of the Bundahišn by Domenico Agostini and Samuel Thrope, it is also called Hadayōš, Haδaiiaš, and Hadayāns, while the alternative name Srisōg is also used. Other translations and secondary works use forms such as Hadhayosh, Hadhyaš, Srisōk, and Srishok.

The principal source for Hadhayosh is the Bundahišn (meaning "Primal Creation"), a Middle Persian Zoroastrian work dealing primarily with cosmology and the nature of the world and its creatures. The work survives in different recensions and reflects a process of compilation and redaction.

The bull also associated with the Zātspram. In this work, an ox named Hadayānš is kept by Gōbadšāh in a metal fortress; its tallow is required for the final yasna ceremony and the preparation of the elixir of immortality. John R. Hinnells discusses the bull in Persian Mythology, using the forms Srishok and Hadhayos.

== Role in Zoroastrian mythology ==
=== The seven regions of the world ===
In Zoroastrian cosmology, the earth was divided into seven regions, known in Middle Persian as kēšvars. Six regions surrounded a centeral region called Xwanīrah. The regions were traditionally conceived as circular and separated by forests, mountaions, or bodies of water.

According to Bundahišn, people traveled from one region to another on the back of the mythical bull Srīsōg, also called Hadayōš. This tradition is associated with migration of people from the central region to the other regions of the world.

John R. Hinnells likewise describes the bull as the means of travel between regions, identifying it as Srishok and Hadhayos in Persian Mythology and as Hadhyaš or Srisōk in his Encyclopaedia Iranica account.

=== The crossing during the reign of Tahmurasp ===
A related accounts appears in the Greater Bundahišn, in its description of the three great sacred fires of Zoroastrianism: Ādur Farnbāg, Ādur Gušnasp, and Ādur Burzēn-Mihr. According to the text, Ohrmazd created these fires at the original creation for the protection of the world.

The Greater Bundahišn also recounts that, during the reign of the legendary king Takhmurup (also known as Tahmurasp), people traveled from Xwaniratha to the other regions on the back of the bull Gav Srisok. During one crossing, a storm agitated the sea, causing the fire altar, together with the fire in contained, to fall from the bull's back into the water. The three great fires then appeared in the place where the altar has stood, illuminating the crossing and allowing the travelers to continue their journey.

Mary Boyce also discusses this episode in Zoroastrians: Their Religious Beliefs and Practices, describing how a brazier carrying fire was blown into the sea during a storm. The three great fires then appeared on the bull's back and illuminated the crossing.

=== Association with Gōbadšāh ===
Hadhayosh is associated in Middle Persian literature with Gōbadšāh (also written Gopatshah), a mythical figure whose identity and nature have been interpreted differently by modern scholars.

In the Mēnōg ī xrad, Gōbadšāh is described as an unusual being with the body of an ox from the feet to the waist and that of a man above. The text also describes him as living beside a lake, worshipping the gods, and pouring ritual libations into the water, thereby killing numerous noxious creatures known in Middle Persian as xrafstars.

Other Middle Persian texts associate Gōbadšāh with a geographical territory and with a sacred bull. The Dādestān ī dēnīg (89.18) refers to a land called Gōbad bum, meaning "land of Gōbad". The Zātspram (35.15), meanwhile, describes Gōbadšāh as keeping an ox named Hadayānš in a metal fortress. The animal's tallow was required for the final yasna ceremony and the preparation of the elixir of immortality.

John R. Hinnells describes Gōbadšāh as a righteous half-man, half-ox figure who guards the bull Srishok (also called Hadhayos). He also states that the bull was destined to be the last animal sacrificed during the Renovation of the universe.

The relationship between these description has been disputed. In his study of a nephrite plate depicting a Bactrian ruler and a bull-man, E. V. Rtveladze argues that the supernatural half-man, half-bull figure and the ruler associated with the protection of the sacred bull should be distinguished from one another. He considers them to represent different figures in the Pahlavi sources rather than different descriptions of a single being.

David Neil MacKenzie, in his Encyclopaedia Iranica entry on Gōbadšāh, discusses that relevant Middle Persian accounts and proposed etymologies of the name. He suggests that the representation of Gōbadšāh as a half-ox figure may have developed through popular etymology, and considers an alternative derivation of the name from gawa-pati- (“lord of Gawa”) more likely than gau-pati- (“lord of cattle”).

=== The final renovation of the world ===
Hadhayosh also plays a role in Zoroastrian eschatological concept of the renovation of the world, known in Middle Persian as frašgird (also written frašagird). This event involves the restoration and transformation of creation following the final defeat of evil, after which the world attains a state of perfection.

According to chapter 24 of the Bundahišn, the bull is associated with the preparation of immortality at the Renovation. Chapter 26 further describes the bull's duty to nurture creatures and connects it with the preparation of the elixir of immortality.

The process is described in greater details in chapter 34, which recounts the resurrection of the dead and the events accompanying the Renovation. During the final sacrifice performed by Sōšāns and his helpers, the bull, called Hadayāns in this passage, is killed. Its fat is used to prepare white Hōm, an elixir of immortality, which is then given to all people, making the immortal.

John R. Hinnells likewise describes bull Srishok (also called Hadhayos) as the last animal to be sacrificed during the Renovation. In his account, the bull's sacrifice and the preparation of the elixir are part of the process by which humanity attains immortality.

== Relationship to other bovine figures ==
Hadhayosh should be distinguished from other important bovine figures in Zoroastrian mythology, particularly Gavaevodata and Geush Urvan, although later Middle Persian traditions establish a connection between the latter two.

Gavaevodata, known in Middle Persian as Gāw ī ēwdād (also written Gāw ī ēwagdād), is uniquely created primordial bovine. According to the Bundahišn, in was one of Ohrmazd's first creations, its body and reproductive seed gave rise to plants and animal life. This creation narrative is distinct from traditions concerning Hadhayosh.

Geush Urvan, an Avestan name meaning the "Soul of the Cow", is another important bovine figure. It features prominently in Yasna 29, a Gathic hymn in which the suffering Cow laments her condition and asks Ahura Mazda for a protector. The hymn's symbolism has been interpreted in different ways by scholars, including as a expression of the plight of Zoroaster's community.

The relationship between Geush Urvan and Gavaevodata becomes more explicit in later Middle Persian literature. The Bundahišn identifies Gōšorun as the soul of the uniquely created bull, emerging from the body after its death. The name Gōšorun derives from Avestan expression Gə̄uš Uruuan,meaning "Soul of the Cow". This later identification should be distinguished from the presentation of Geush Urvan in Yasna 29.

Although all three figures belong to the border of the broader traditions of bovine imagery in Zoroastrian religion, the surviving texts associate them with different narratives. Hadhayosh is associated with travel between the regions of the world and the final renovation of creation, whereas Gavaevodata and Geush Urvan belong to traditions concerning primordial creation, the origin of animal life, and the suffering of the Cow.
