= Haoma =

Zoroastrian god of divine priesthood and the sacred plant

Haoma Avestan: 𐬵𐬀𐬊𐬨𐬀
- God of Divine priesthood, healing, harvests and the sacred haoma plant.
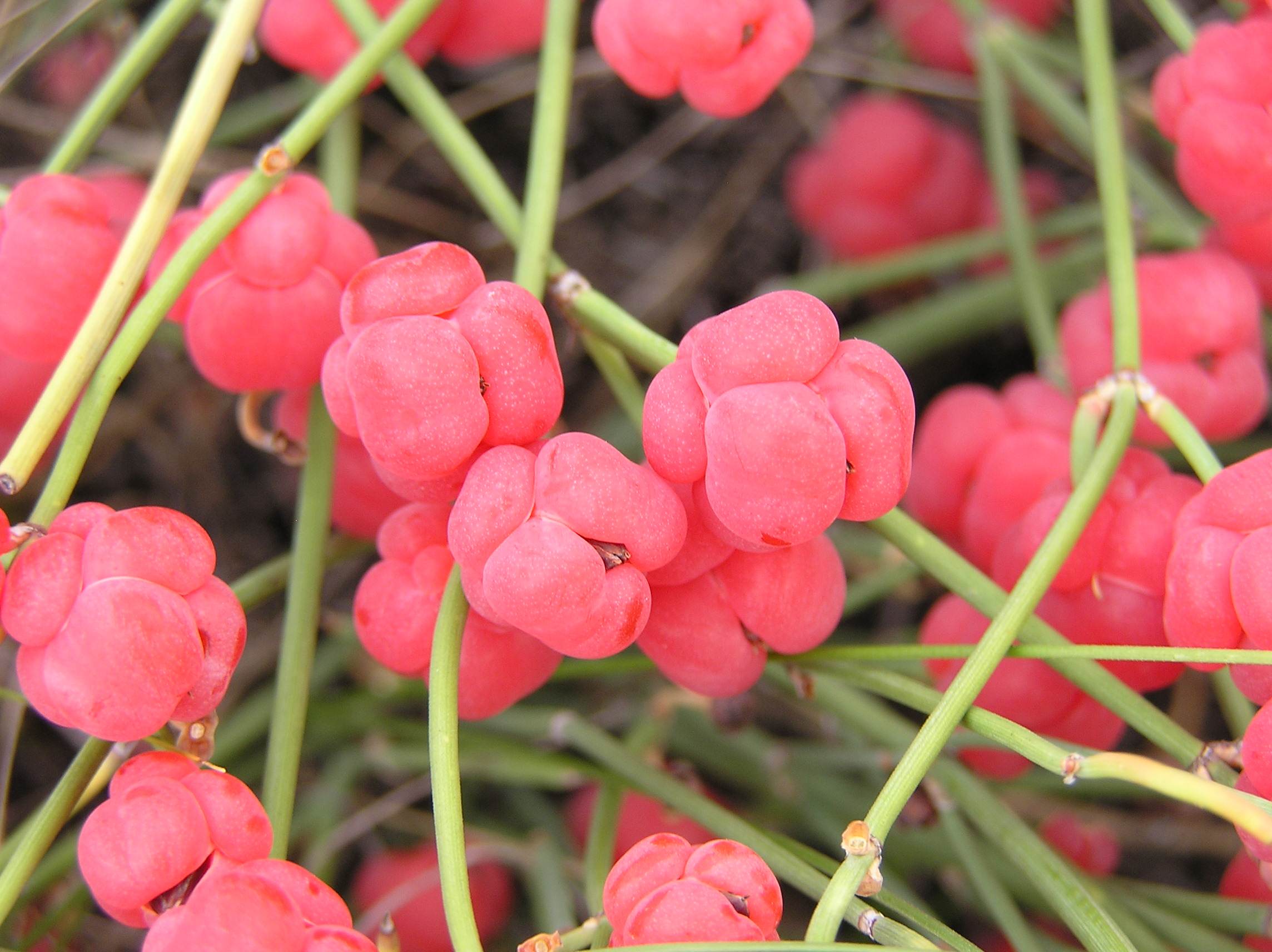
- Ephedra, a plant used in Zoroastrian haoma rituals
- Other names: Hum, Hauma, Hom
- Symbol: The Haoma plant
- Attributes: Healing, strength, victory, fertility, wisdom, and ritual sacrifice
- Texts: Avesta
- Gender: Unisex
- Associated deities: Tishtrya, Mithra, Vayu-Vata, Chista

Equivalents
- Hindu: Soma

Haoma (Avestan: 𐬵𐬀𐬊𐬨𐬀) also known as Hom (Middle Persian: 𐭧𐭥𐭬) is a sacred plant and yazata in Zoroastrianism, inherited from Indo-Iranian religion and corresponding to Vedic soma. Its pressed juice is prepared and consecrated in the yasna ceremony. The divinity Haoma acts as a priest and is invoked for strength, healing, victory, fertility, wisdom and righteous conduct. In the Hom Yašt, Haoma appears to Zoroaster in human form and instructs him to gather and press the plant. He is the lord of plants, grants good harvests and is associated with the souls of sacrificed animals alongside Goshurvan.

The identity of the original Indo-Iranian plant remains disputed. Ephedra has long been used in Iranian Zoroastrian practice and is a major candidate, but scholars have also proposed cannabis, fly-agaric and other plants. The Vedic and Avestan texts describe stimulating, invigorating and other unusual effects, whose precise character is debated. The names haoma and soma are related to words for pressing or crushing. The first parahaoma is drunk by the officiating priest, whereas the second is offered to water. Haoma also receives a prescribed share of animal sacrifice, linked to his role as a divine priest. His rites connect ancient Indo-Iranian practices with later Zoroastrian worship.

In the myths, the first men to press haoma receive illustrious sons, including Jamshid, Fereydun, Garshasp and Zoroaster. The mythical White Haoma, identified with the tree Gaokərəna in Pahlavi tradition, confers long life and plays a part in the final renewal of the world, when the resurrected righteous receive immortality.

== Etymology and names ==
The Avestan Haoma and Sanskrit soma descend from Proto-Indo-Iranian *sauma. Their respective verbal roots, Avestan hu- and Sanskrit su-, mean “press” or “pound”. Boyce also gives the verbal root as sav-. The original name denoted the pressed substance or extract rather than the plant itself. Its use for a plant yielding that extract is therefore a transfer of meaning. Western scholars began efforts to identify the original *sauma plant more than two centuries ago, after encountering it in written sources. Its botanical identity remains disputed.

The Middle Persian form is 𐭧𐭥𐭬 Haoma, continued in Persian Hum (هوم) and related Iranian-language forms Haoma and hūm. Sogdian has xwm, while Sanskrit soma survives as som or soma in living Indic languages. A Zaza dictionary records homa in the sense of the divine or God.

== Origins and development ==
Haoma belongs to a shared Indo-Iranian religious inheritance. Zoroastrian tradition preserves the divine plant Haoma, also known in later Persian mythology, while Hindu tradition preserves his counterpart, Soma, who likewise appears as both a plant and a deity. These traditions have often been compared in attempts to identify the original plant. Their religious and ritual similarities, however, had received relatively little systematic comparative study when Jan Houben reviewed the field after the 1999 Leiden workshop. As of 2003, Houben found no substantial comparison of the sacred figures themselves beyond Alfred Hillebrandt's 1891 study of the Vedic and Zoroastrian divinities. More recent investigations into their shared history had concentrated on identifying *sauma botanically. The Leiden workshop, the first devoted to the subject, likewise chiefly examined the plant and its pressed juice.

In an account of the cult's development, the belief in Haoma as a deity arose from repeated rites involving the plant. Consecrating the plant gave rise to its divine personification, while the priest's act of offering it gave rise to Haoma's role as a divine priest. The plant's place in everyday life was also understood to have fostered an extensive mythology in which the divine figure's attributes ultimately derived from the herb he embodied.

== Haoma as a plant ==
In the Hom Yašt, the plant has the features of an ordinary chlorophyll-bearing plant. Its Avestan colour terms, zairi- and zairi.gaona-, evoke yellow, gold and green, comparable with Sanskrit hari-. More tellingly, the text speaks of its stems, shoots and branches (Avestan varəšajīš, frasparəγə̄ and frauuāxšə̄, compared with Pahlavi ēwan, spēg and tāg, Yasna 10.5). A further description calls it pouru.saradha, “of many kinds”. This has been interpreted as meaning that the plant, like ephedra, comprised several species. Haoma has pliant shoots, a green colour, fragrance, and a fleshy or milky quality called gaoman. It grows both on mountain summits and in river valleys. On high Harā (a mythical mountain), it was first nourished by clouds and rain carried by the south wind from the sea Vourukasha.

One epithet is nąmyąsu-, “having tender or pliant ąsu” (Yasna 9.16). Another interpretation renders it “having tasty ąsu”. The corresponding Vedic soma is not described as sweet (mádhu-) in this context, but as sharp or astringent (tīvrá-). Because ąsu (Sanskrit aṃśu) occurs specifically with Haoma and Soma, it has been proposed as the original plant's name. A more likely interpretation takes it to mean a twig, as does Pahlavi tāg in Yasna 10.2. The ancient Indo-Iranian *sauma yielded a powerful stimulant when its plant material was crushed and mixed with water or milk. In Iranian ritual, stems were pounded in a mortar and their consecrated juice was thought to give priests greater insight and receptivity to divine prompting, while the plant's effects were associated with inspiration for poets, while it stirred battle fury and strength among warriors and made them formidable fighters. The original botanical species is unknown. The Iranian plant was described as green, pliant, fragrant and fleshy, and the species used by later Zoroastrians has been identified as ephedra, credited in some accounts with hallucinatory properties.

It is possible in principle that the term *sauma referred to several similar or even quite different plants, as suggested by Avestan pouru.sarəδa- (Yasna 10.12). One approach holds that the mythical features of Haoma and Soma led worshippers to select replacement plants. This has been associated with Kuiper's and Windfuhr's interpretations. Against it, Steblin-Kamenskij and Falk emphasize the close correspondences between the Iranian and Indian technical terms and epithets. On that reading, the common ancestors of Iranians and Indo-Aryans drank the extract of a particular plant, and the plant's pharmacological action accounts for its portrayal in the Avesta and Vedas.

The Brahmans acknowledged that the old Soma plant was no longer available in their own land and that their sacrificial preparation used a substitute. The Zoroastrian scriptures do not discuss an equivalent replacement, but Iranian communities have used ephedra as haoma for centuries. The plant is found across Central Asia and in the Iranian mountains. Its hard, fibrous stalks require crushing to reach the pith, which was said to have hallucinatory properties. Its appearance fits the Avesta's short and somewhat vague description, and long-established Iranian ritual conservatism has been used to argue that an ephedra species may have been the original Indo-Iranian plant. The much more elaborate Vedic poetic descriptions, however, are harder to reconcile with ephedra. Boyce considered it unlikely that specialists of the two religions would reach agreement on the ancient plant's identity.

Grinding in a mortar was probably the common Indo-Iranian practice, preserved among Zoroastrians. Brahman priests instead pounded Soma against a stone laid over a bull's hide. The requirement to crush tough material weighs against identifying the original plant with a soft mushroom. Wasson suggested that pounding could have been a later innovation, but Brough objected that this overlooked Iranian evidence. In a review of the 1999 Leiden workshop, Jan Houben nevertheless upheld ephedra as a serious contender for both Rigvedic Soma and Avestan Haoma, despite efforts to reject it in favour of hallucinogenic plants. Several other species have been proposed. A hallucinogenic interpretation of Rigveda 10.119 was criticized by Falk as a mistaken reading of that hymn. In 1921 B. L. Mukherjee suggested hemp (Cannabis sativa or C. indica), an identification independently favoured by Henrik Samuel Nyberg. Walter Bruno Henning rejected Nyberg's view of Zoroaster's use of hemp and warned that psychotropic drugs led to physical, mental and moral decline. Taillieu criticized that argument for neglecting the importance of dosage. Robert Gordon Wasson, drawing on his research into Mesoamerican psilocybin-mushroom cults, proposed the fly agaric, Amanita muscaria, in 1968. John Brough objected that the stupor sometimes caused by fly agaric did not fit a drink said to invigorate warriors. Wasson largely conceded this difficulty, but Ilya Gershevitch noted that a moderate dose could act as a stimulant and advanced further arguments for the fungus. Mandrake (Mandragora turcomanica) and ginseng (Panax ginseng) have also been proposed, without gaining much support.

Harry Falk instead argued in 1989 that the desired effect was alertness rather than hallucination, as produced by ephedrine. He pointed to the nocturnal Atirātra ritual, where Soma helped the priests remain awake and provided a stimulating offering to Indra in his battle with Vṛtra (Bahram). Ephedrine acts more mildly but lasts longer than adrenaline, and elimination of a hydroxyl group on its side chain can convert it chemically into methamphetamine or another stimulating amine. The alkaloid dissolves in water. Taillieu argues that climatic conditions made its full effects available only in the mountainous borderlands of India and Greater Iran, where Ephedra gerardiana, E. procera and E. intermedia grow. This geographic restriction has been used to explain the post-Vedic question asked of Soma sellers about whether their plants came from Mount Mūjavat. An ephedrine side effect, restricted urination, has also been compared with the priests' dread of dying from urinary retention, ámeha.

The effects sought in prayers to Haoma include healing and sexual arousal, probably related to the plant's action, as well as bodily strength, heightened thought and the experience commonly translated as “intoxication” (Yasna 9.3–27, 10.8–9). This last term is Avestan maδa-, cognate with Sanskrit mada-. Its exact meaning cannot be established from the Avestan passages or the varied Pahlavi renderings. One Pahlavi equivalent, mʾdyšn (Yasna 9.17, 10.18–19), elsewhere denotes sexual intercourse. Another is mnyšn, “thought” (Yasna 10.14), while the expression is omitted from the translation of Yasna 10.10. The Hom Yašt describes Haoma's maδa with fraša- (“bright”), varəziiaŋhuua- (“life-invigorating”), raoxšna- (“light”) and rənjiia- (“swift”) (Yasna 10.14, 10.19). Haoma is also called the best aid for the soul's journey, urunaēča pāθmainiiō.təma- (Yasna 9.16), and invoked for the best existence, vahišta- ahū- (Yasna 9.19, 11.10). An older identification treated *sauma as an alcoholic drink. In Nērangestān 12.2, where maδa- is not a reference to Haoma, the Pahlavi translation uses may, “wine”. Because fermented drinks also had widespread ritual uses, the alcoholic interpretation was nearly a consensus in earlier studies surveyed by O'Flaherty up to 1968. It was still maintained by Vasilii Abaev in 1975 and Rausing in 1987. Neither the brief preparation of Soma or Haoma nor the scriptures provide evidence for fermentation. The rite allows too little time for it, and distillation would be anachronistic.

The pressed drink was thought to bring exhilaration and enhanced power without the harmful consequences of other intoxicants. Yasna 10.8 contrasts the maδa of Haoma, which makes its drinker swift, with other forms accompanied by the daeva of Wrath bearing a bloody club. Haoma's maδa is accompanied instead by asha, righteousness. Vedic priests similarly distinguished Soma from the fermented drink surā. The Śatapatha Brāhmaṇa contrasts Soma with truth, prosperity and light against surā with falsehood, misery and darkness. According to one interpretation, Soma heightened the qualities required by different drinkers. Warriors became fierce and formidable in battle, poets felt divine inspiration and possession, and priests acquired the wisdom to discern or predict sacred matters.

== Haoma as a God ==
Haoma appears in the Hom Yašt before Zoroaster as Dūraoša, a beautiful man who tells the prophet to gather and press the plant for the purification of water. One account identifies this as the only human-shaped appearance in those hymns. Boyce also describes Haoma as conceived in human form in his priestly and other roles. Zoroaster asks, “Who are you, O man, the fairest whom I have seen of all the corporeal world?” Haoma names himself and commands Zoroaster to collect and press him for drinking, and to praise his strengthening power. These invocations can speak of plant and divinity together. His human manifestation has green eyes, zairi.dōithra-, reflecting the colour of the herb. He is also hailed as golden-green-eyed. Haoma, according to Yašt 10.90, first offered the sacred plant with a star-adorned mortar fashioned by spirits, and he guards mountain plants on the highest peak.

Haoma is righteous, promotes righteousness, possesses wisdom and grants insight (Yasna 9.22). The title aša.vazah-, “furthering aša”, connects plant and deity to the Ahuras, who guard cosmic order. He is also hukhratu-, “of good wisdom”, with Vedic Soma addressed as sukratu-. His epithet dūraoša- corresponds to Vedic duroṣa-, but its meaning remains disputed. Ohrmazd installed Haoma as the first priest, girding him with the sacred aiwiyanghan (Yasna 9.26). In that capacity he serves the Amehraspands (Yašt 10.89). The Vedic Soma likewise acts as priest among the gods, over whom he has universal dominion and to whom he imparts strength. Haoma is also a fighter. The power of the intoxicating plant to stir warriors to battle fury was understood as a quality of the deity himself. An old sacrificial prayer asks him to strike the dragon, murderers, tyrants and harlots with his mace. He can grant strength throughout the body, every form of ecstasy and victory over any enemy, whether two-footed or four-footed. Accordingly he bears the epithet vərəthrajan, “victorious”, which is also the name of the god of war. Zoroastrians could perform a yasna in his honour to bring about the defeat of an opposing army. Soma too is a great combatant in Vedic descriptions, and priests who drink Soma are said to be capable of killing with a glance.

As the personification of the foremost medicinal plant, wholesome for human beings and animals, Haoma was revered as a healer who grants health and bodily strength. Soma's medicinal powers are even said to restore sight to the blind and movement to the lame. Proper prayers to Haoma bring well-being, and a yasna should be celebrated for him when pestilence threatens. As lord of plants, he grants good harvests, another purpose for dedicating yasnas to him. Women also pray for sons distinguished by their mental and bodily qualities, a practice reported among orthodox Parsis. Fereydun and Garshasp were born to fathers who had pressed and drunk the plant. Despite his role in sacrifice, Haoma cares for animals. He nourishes them through plants and ensures that the rites needed for their souls to reach their allotted place after death are performed. With Goshurvan and Goshtashan, he is therefore one of the divinities particularly responsible for animals.

== Mythology and eschatology ==
The first four men who pressed haoma were each rewarded with an outstanding son. Vivanghvant became the father of Jamshid, Athwya of Fereydun, Thrita of Garshasp and Pourushaspa of Zoroaster. In Iranian epic tradition, Haoma later aided Kavi Haosravah in defeating the powerful Fraŋrasyan. The involvement of the warrior estate in the ancient cult is considered certain in Boyce's account. Possible material evidence has been identified in the Persepolis treasury, where many finely worked stone mortars and pestles of the kind used for preparing parahaoma were found in deposits dating to the early fifth century BCE. In a narrative about Zoroaster's coming into the world, his fravahr, or guardian spirit, was the second part of his being to descend from heaven. Neryosang, the divine messenger, and Jamshid, the ideal king of earlier times, carried it from the abode of the Bounteous Immortals. They placed the fravahr inside a haoma stem at the top of a tall tree. Although the earthly plant grows in the mountains, the celestial being, purified in heaven, is said to stand above all worlds.

The mythical tree Gaokərəna that stands near the Tree of All Seeds in the sea of Vourukasha is named in the Pahlavi texts as the "White Haoma", and the Vendidad (20.4) places healing plants around it, calling it the “chief of plants”. It is called the “mighty Gaokərəna” in Yašt 1.30, with the Middle Persian names Gōkarn and Gōkart. Eating from it extends life and holds back “short-breathed age”, and it is to make the resurrected dead immortal. The two cosmic trees (Tree of All Seeds and Gaokərəna) are sometimes confused. Both stand near each other, have the kar-fish as guardian, and are linked to healing vegetation. Older Indo-Iranian ideas have been proposed behind this mythology. In the Indian parallel, the enormous Jambū tree, which gives Jambūdvipa its name, grows south of Mount Mēru, just as Vourukasha lies south of Harā. Jambū, too, is connected with soma, immortality and medicinal plants.

At the end of world history, Soshyant will officiate at the final sacrifice. Its victim is the last animal to die in humanity's service, the bull Hadhayans, in contrast with the Uniquely-created Bull, the first creature to die at the start of the time of Mixture. An immortalizing drink will be made from the bull's fat and the mythical White Haoma of the cosmic ocean. All righteous people will partake of its zaothra and of parahaoma from White Haoma, and their resurrected bodies will become immortal as their souls already are. Offerings to fire and water at this final rite are also presumed to restore the earth's original changeless perfection, after its cleansing by molten metal.

== Ritual and worship ==
Soma, the Indian counterpart to Haoma, is central to Vedic worship as both a plant and a god. Its pressed juice passes through a woollen filter into vessels of milk and water. The resulting yellow drink is compared with sunlight, while its flowing liquid is likened to rainfall. These images accompany Soma's titles as Lord or King of the streams and giver of fertility. The preparation and offering of Soma or Haoma is the distinguishing feature of the Vedic yajña and Iranian yasna. It has been called the focal act of Vedic religion and was evidently prominent in pre-Zoroastrian Iran. In one reconstruction of primeval sacrifices, it belongs alongside offerings of animals and humans among three acts that first brought life into the world. The pressed plant represents the creation of vegetation, upon which people and animals depend.

The yasna remains a principal Zoroastrian rite centred on preparing Haoma. Zoroaster's hymns have been interpreted as meditations upon this ceremony, and they survive embedded in its recited prayers. Just as Haoma appeared to Zoroaster during his performance of the rite, Zoroastrian belief holds that he attends the offerings of other worshippers as well. The consecrated daily drink symbolizes White Haoma, the source of immortality at the end of history, and thus anticipates that future state. The practice connects ancient tradition with living Zoroastrian ritual. Evidence for the Iranian cult is scattered but substantial. The Hom Yašt, preserved in Younger Avestan but considered much older in substance, forms Yasna 9–11. It is recited before and during the first ceremonial drinking of parahaoma, the preparation made from the plant. Before the drink is taken, worshippers call on the “green” Haoma and seek his maδa, health, strength and victory.

Stone tools from Persepolis provide possible evidence for the ancient preparation of the drink. The treasury yielded ninety-seven mortars and eighty pestles, most bearing inscriptions. Their short Aramaic texts are broadly similar, but unknown words and puzzling usages make their full meaning uncertain. Their finely worked forms resemble the instruments used to crush haoma, although their proposed ritual identification remains tentative. In the first Zoroastrian preparation, priests pound haoma twigs and pomegranate leaves together, soak them in pure water, then strain the liquid. The sieve was formerly made with hairs from a sacrificial bull. Among Parsis, a sacred bull called the varasya supplied these hairs, known as varas. The officiating priest drinks the resulting infusion as representative of humanity, the sixth creation. From the Hom Yašt, Boyce inferred that this first parahaoma preserves an earlier communal maδa taken by initiates from the priestly, warrior and poetic groups. The old drink may have consisted only of haoma and water, with pomegranate adopted later from the second preparation.

The second parahaoma is specifically priestly. It combines Haoma, pomegranate and milk, resembling the water offering still made by Zoroastrian villagers. Rather than being drunk, this preparation serves as a libation. After the ceremony of consecration, the priest pours it into pure water, either a stream or a well. Haoma also receives a fixed part of animal sacrifice. As the heavenly priest, he is believed to care for the sacrificed creature's soul, which could accuse a sacrificer at judgment if his portion were withheld. The stipulated portion was the two jawbones, tongue and left eye, and the Hom Yašt curses any priest, farmer or warrior who denies him his share. The plant itself supplies the offering to the Waters from Haoma's “body”. The division of meat has been explained by analogy with a mortal priest's entitlement to a portion of every sacrifice he performed. The divine priest was allotted a share in the same way. Soma's priestly role and its regular association with blood sacrifice in India have been taken as evidence that this idea goes back to Indo-Iranian religion.

In Yašt 10.90, Haoma is the first to offer the plant on high Harā with his star-adorned mortar, made by spirits. He serves as the zaotar, the officiating priest who sacrifices swiftly, and performs spiritual offerings to Druvāspā, Mithra and Sraoša. Boyce suggested that repeated consecration of parahaoma produced the conception of Haoma as a god, as repeated animal sacrifice shaped the conception of Gōuš Urvan. Since the two offerings were regularly joined, Haoma came to preside over both in the mythology. The offering to Haoma also survives in ritual actions involving dogs. In older Iranian Zoroastrian practice, the strictest believers gave food to a dog before eating themselves, an observance still found among a few elderly villagers recorded by Boyce. The food was believed to reach the unseen realm of gods and departed souls through the animal. Thus a deceased person's meal could be given to a dog three times daily during the three days the soul remained on earth, and a portion of memorial offerings went to the dog as intermediary. Vedic material also links dogs to the dead, suggesting a possible Indo-Iranian origin for that association. The further idea that dogs receive offerings on behalf of gods appears more specifically Iranian and may have developed by analogy with food for the deceased. Haoma's sacrificial share is a particularly clear example. The tongue of the dead animal is roasted during its consecration to Haoma, releasing its bōy, and then ceremonially fed to a dog.

The sharing of consecrated food and drink by Zoroastrians and Brahmans has prompted comparisons with communion meals in other religions. Hubert and Mauss interpreted the Indian blood and Soma offerings as involving the death of a deity and linked them through wider comparisons to Christian sacrifice. Zaehner applied a similar comparison to Iranian Haoma ritual. Yasna 11.4 calls Haoma a “son of Ahura Mazda”, a title more often given to Fire. An interpretation stressing the deity's death during pressing, his real presence in the drink, his resurrection and renewed death in the next ritual can make the ceremony resemble Christian communion. Boyce opposed this analogy when set against the wider Iranian religious context. Keith likewise explained the original Soma rite primarily as an offering of intoxicating drink to a god whose conception arose from that offering. Only in the later Brāhmaṇas does pounding the plant become a symbolic death of Soma. Keith treated those statements as speculative rather than expressions of a firmly felt belief that the god actually died.

== See also ==
- Botanical identity of soma–haoma
- Ab-Zohr, preparation and use of parahaoma in this rite
- Manna, the Biblical edible equivalent.
- Soma, the Vedic equivalent of Haoma.
- Tree of life

== Bibliography ==
- Boyce, Mary (1979). Zoroastrians: Their Religious Beliefs and Practices. London: Routledge. ISBN 0-415-23903-6.
- Dhalla, Maneckji Nusserwanji (1938). History of Zoroastrianism. New York: OUP.
- Falk, Harry (1989). "Soma I and II". Bulletin of the School of Oriental and African Studies. 52/1 (1). London: UCL Press: 77–90. doi:10.1017/S0041977X00023077. JSTOR 617914. S2CID 146512196.
- Guénon, René (2004). Symbols of Sacred Science. Sophia Perennis. ISBN 978-0-900588-77-8.
- Hillebrandt, Alfred (1891). Vedische Mythologie. I: Soma und verwandte Goetter. Breslau: Koebner.
- Houben, Jan E. M. (May 4, 2003a). "The Soma-Haoma problem". Electronic Journal of Vedic Studies. 9/1a.
- Houben, Jan E. M. (May 4, 2003b). "Report of the Workshop". Electronic Journal of Vedic Studies. 9/1b.
- Kellens, Jean (2 December 2011) [1996]. "Dūraoša". Encyclopaedia Iranica. Archived from the original on 5 December 2017.
- Müller, Friedrich Max, ed. (1887). "Yasna 9-11 (Hom Yasht)". Sacred Books of the East. Vol. 31. Translated by Mills, Lawrence Heyworth. Oxford University Press.
- Taillieu, Dieter and Boyce, Mary (2002). "Haoma". Encyclopaedia Iranica. New York: Mazda Pub. Archived from the original on 2006-06-29.
- van der Toorn, Karel; Becking, Bob; van der Horst, Pieter Willem (1999). Dictionary of Deities and Demons in the Bible. Wm. B. Eerdmans Publishing. ISBN 978-0-8028-2491-2.

Haoma Avestan: 𐬵𐬀𐬊𐬨𐬀
- God of Divine priesthood, healing, harvests and the sacred haoma plant.
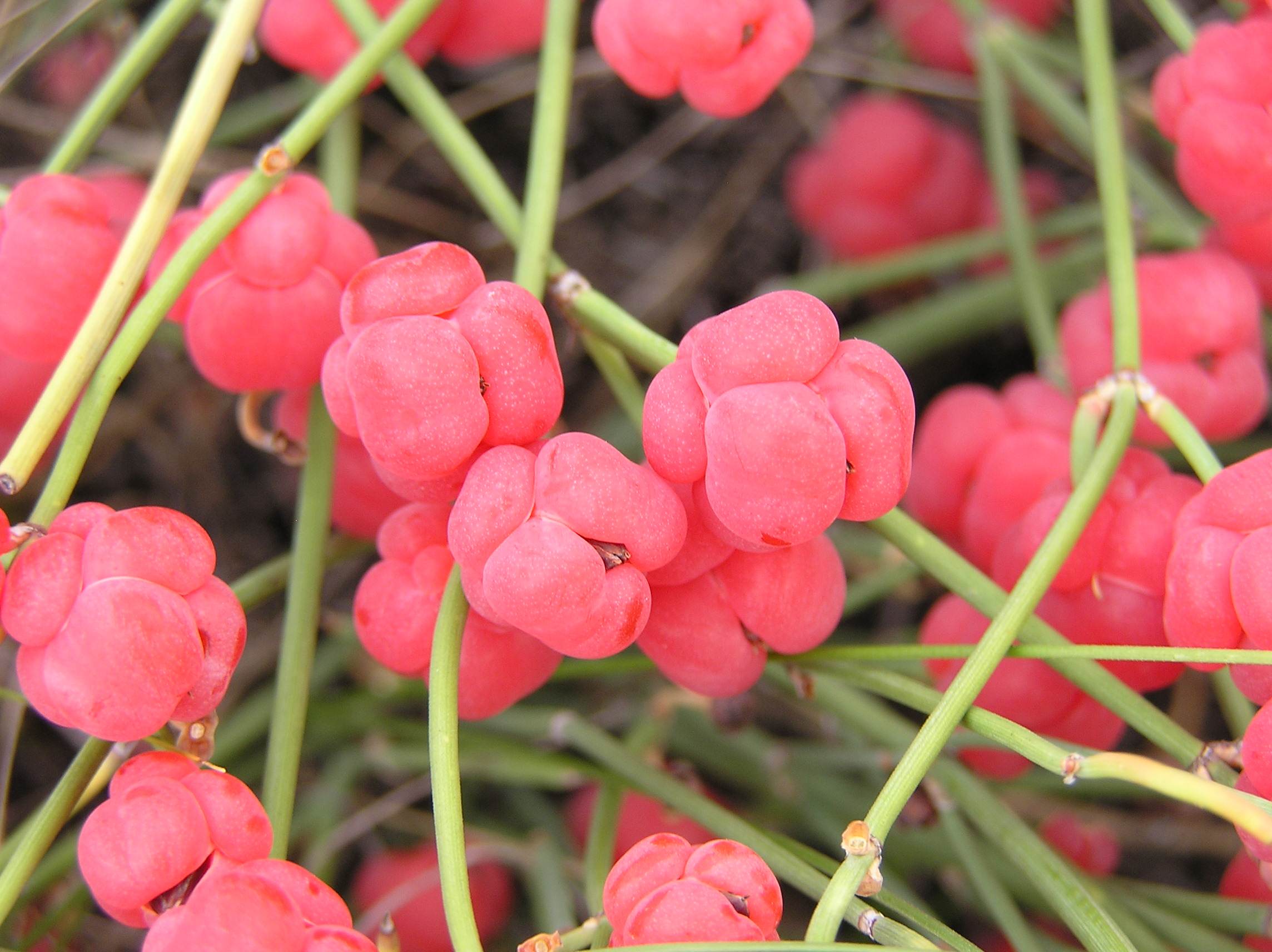
- Ephedra, a plant used in Zoroastrian haoma rituals
- Other names: Hum, Hauma, Hom
- Symbol: The Haoma plant
- Attributes: Healing, strength, victory, fertility, wisdom, and ritual sacrifice
- Texts: Avesta
- Gender: Male
- Associated deities: Tishtrya, Mithra, Vayu-Vata, Chista

Equivalents
- Hindu: Soma
