= Vourukasha =

Zoroastrian mythical sea

Vourukasha, also known as Warkash or Fraxkard, is the world ocean in Zoroastrian cosmology and Iranian mythology. In addition to its role in mythology, it may also have referred to real-world places at different times.

== Name ==
The ocean appears in Avestan texts as Vourukasha with the meaning having many inlets. In the Middle Persian texts, the ocean is called Warkash or Fraxkard (Middle Persian: plʾhwklt). Here, Warkash is the Middle Persian rendering of the Avestan term, whereas Fraxkard is a translation from Avestan. It consists of frax, meaning vast, and kard, meaning bay or inlet.

== Description ==
According to the description in the Vendidad, the Vourukasha sea lies south of Hara Berezaiti mountain and covers roughly one third of the earth's surface. At the center of the ocean, the mountain Ushendava stands, where the vapors gather as rain clouds. Vourukasha is, consequently, the source of all waters and the two mythical rivers, Arang and Wehrot, originate there and eventually flow back there.

The Gaokerena tree grows at the deepest part of the Vourukasha and it is the dwelling place of the Kar fish and the Wāsī pančā sadwarām. According to the Tishtar Yasht, it is the place where the fight between Tishtrya (rain god) and Apaosha (drought demon) takes place.

== Location ==
Vourukasha is seen as a primarily mythological place. However, like, e.g., Hara Berezaiti or Airyanem Vaejah, it may also have referred to real-world locations at different times and in different contexts. Bartholomae has for instance speculated that it may have originally referred to the Aral Lake or the Caspian Sea. Based on the geographical references in the Zamyad Yasht, it has also been connected to Hamun Lake.
