= Tishtrya =

Zoroastrian divinity of rain and the star Sirius

Tishtar
- Master of the stars, liberator of waters, personification of Sirius
- Tishtar depicted in a late fifth- to early sixth-century Sogdian painting
- Other names: Tish, Tishtrya, Tisht, Tir, Teiro, Tiri
- Avestan: 𐬙𐬌𐬱𐬙𐬭𐬌𐬌𐬀
- Affiliation: The Thirty-Three Deities, Guardians of the Days of the Month
- Animals: Golden-horned bull, white horse
- Symbols: Arrow, rain, young man
- Day: 13th day of each month
- Texts: Tisht Yasht, Aban Yasht
- Gender: Male; feminine representations in Central Asian art
- Region: Iran, Central Asia
- Festivals: Tirgan, 13th day of the Fourth month (Tir)

Equivalents
- Greek: Apollo; Artemis
- Hindu: Tiṣya

Tishtrya (Avestan: 𐬙𐬌𐬱𐬙𐬭𐬌𐬌𐬀, romanized: Tištriia), also known as Tishtar (Middle Persian: 𐭲𐭩𐭱𐭲𐭫) and closely identified with Tir (Middle Persian: 𐭲𐭩𐭫), also known as Teiro (Bactrian: ΤΕΙΡΟ), is a yazata in Zoroastrianism and ancient Iranian religion, and the personification of Sirius, the brightest star in the night sky. He commands the fixed stars of the eastern quarter of the heavens as the chief adversary of the planet Mercury, and governs the liberation of the heavenly waters, battling the forces of drought to release the rains that sustain life on earth.

Tishtar's celestial authority is expressed in the Avesta, where Ohrmazd is said to have created him as “lord and overseer of all stars, as Zoroaster of men”. His principal mythological task is to liberate the waters of the sea Vourukaša, which are released as rain upon the earth. To accomplish this, he must overcome the demon Apaosha, the embodiment of drought. His victory, achieved through the strengthening power of worship, allows the waters to flow and sustains the growth of vegetation. Tishtar also initiates the wider circulation of waters between earth and sky, a function emphasized in Minardi's interpretation of a celestial representation in which Sirius is depicted at the centre of the heavenly vault supported by the god.

The movement of Tishtar through the heavens is also associated with the symbolism of the arrow. One of his distinctive Avestan epithets is khšviwi-vāza-, meaning “swift-flying”. In the Tishtar Yašt, his swift and direct movement toward the waters is twice compared with an arrow shot by Arash, described as the “best archer among the Iranians”. Tishtar is also generally regarded as an Indo-Iranian divinity whose name probably corresponds to the Vedic Tiṣya,an identification supported by the etymological explanation proposed by Forssman. The star personified by the divinity is usually identified with Sirius or Canis Major.

Beyond his celestial and rain-related functions, Tishtar is also described as the protector of travelers in the Šāyest nē šāyest. His identification with Tir was accompanied by additional associations in religious iconography. In Bactrian representations, Tir appears on a type of Kushan coin with attributes recalling the Greek goddess Artemis, particularly her role as an archer and goddess of hunting. Tir-Tishtar was also depicted alongside Nana as a pair of four-handed divinities, probably understood as joint protectors of rainfall and hunting. In these representations, Tir-Tishtar holds an arrow and is sometimes regarded as the consort of Nana.

== Origins and identification ==
The origins of Tiri are uncertain. One proposal identifies him with the old Armenian god Tiur, whom the Armenians may in turn have adopted from an earlier population of the region. On this account, the neighboring Medes may also have worshipped Tiur or Tiri, with the Magi bringing his cult into Zoroastrianism after adopting the religion. Neither the etymology of Tiri nor the proposed linguistic connection with Tiur has received a satisfactory explanation. Another interpretation places Tiri among the gods of western Iran and holds that his worship entered Zoroastrianism with the conversion of his followers. In this view, the similarity of their names, perhaps reinforced by comparable beneficial roles, led to Tiri being associated with the Avestan Tishtar. Despite this association, the two divinities appear to have occupied distinct positions in early Iranian religious tradition.

Although both Tiri and Tishtar are well attested individually, the surviving ancient evidence never places their names together. Tishtar is celebrated in an evidently ancient Yašt, whereas Tiri is entirely unknown in the Avesta. Their standing in the Zoroastrian calendar is markedly different: a day, a month, and a major festival bear Tiri’s name, whereas Tishtar, despite having his own Yašt, has no separate calendar day. The calendar has therefore been taken to indicate that Tiri was already an established object of Zoroastrian worship when its dedications were fixed, perhaps in the late Achaemenid period. The distinction between the two divinities is also preserved in Pahlavi astronomical and astrological traditions. In the Bundahišn, Tishtar appears as the leader of the fixed stars of the eastern quarter (Tishtar xwarāsān spāhbed), under the general command of the Pole Star, and as the direct antagonist of the planet Tir.

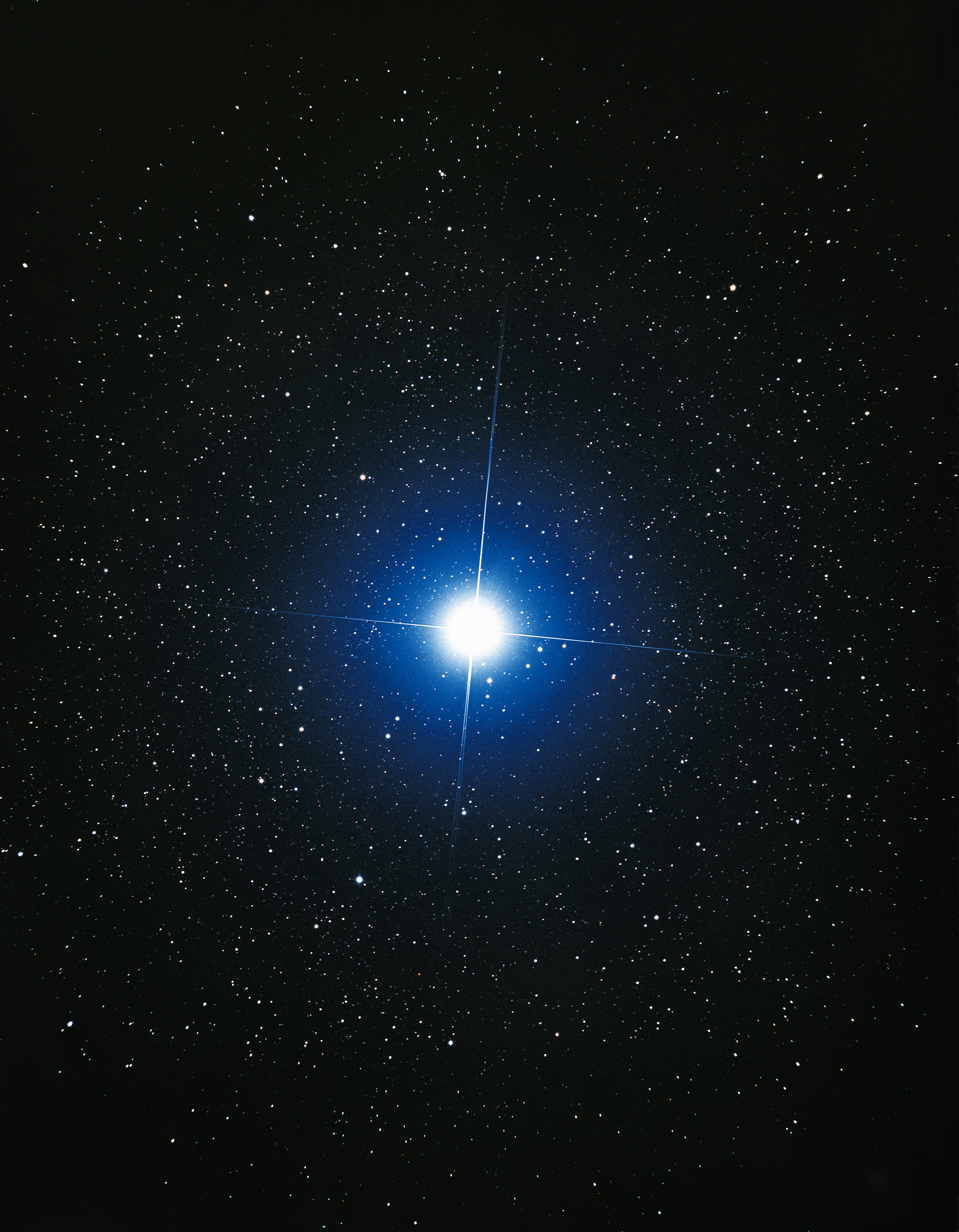
Close-up image of the star Sirius, which Tishtar personifies

Beyond astronomy, Tishtar figures centrally in the Iranian myth concerning the release of the waters. His role has been compared, at least to a certain extent, both structurally and functionally, with that of the Vedic Indra Vṛtrahán. Parallel passages in the Tishtar Yašt and the Wahrām Yašthave been examined within this Indo-Iranian framework by Benveniste and Panaino, while Kellens has offered a further analysis of the problems involved. Middle Persian religious texts also preserve accounts of Tishtar’s mythological activity. Tishtar remained an object of worship and was mentioned in various Pahlavi texts, particularly the astronomical and astrological chapters of the Bundahišn. An account of the cycle of Tishtar is preserved in the Anthology of Zādsparam, while the Dādestān ī Dēnīg provides an additional description of the liberation of the waters and rains. At the same time, Pahlavi sources identify him with Tiri even while preserving his distinct mythological role. In the later Pahlavi tradition, Tir, representing the planet Mercury, was strongly connected, confused, and even merged with the Avestan deified star Tishtar, identified with Sirius and celebrated in Yašt 8. A Pahlavi text states explicitly that “Tir is Teštar”.

Middle Persian liturgical formulas offer especially clear evidence of the identification. Although Tiri is unknown in the Avesta, both the fourth month of the Zoroastrian calendar and the thirteenth day of each month are named for him. The Zoroastrian services performed on the thirteenth day are nevertheless dedicated in Avestan to Tishtar and in Middle Persian to Teštar-Tir together. Furthermore, every niyayeš or Yašt recited on that day concludes with the Middle Persian formula: röz něk năm, rõz pāk nām, rõz mubārak, rōz Teštar-Tir yazad, meaning “day of fair fame, day of pure fame, auspicious day, day of Teštar-Tir Yazad”. These formulas suggest that Tir and Tishtar had become completely identified by the Middle Iranian period. The Parsi drōn service for the star-yazad Vanant offers another instance of their joint identity. In this ceremony, the drōn is divided into four pieces, assigned respectively to Vanant and his three associates, Tishtar-Tir, Sadwēsh, and Haftorang. It has been suggested that the identification of the two divinities may have been formally established by theologians, while the laity proved less willing to accept it.

The Pahlavi tradition nevertheless retained a distinction between Tir and Tishtar, especially after planets came to be classed as demonic. In western Iran, Tiriya, the god associated with Mercury, was probably a protector of scribes, comparable to Thoth-Mercury in Egypt and Nabû-Mercury in Babylon. Tiriya was probably associated with Tishtar, but following the demonization of the planets, Tir came to be regarded as a demon. Pahlavi texts preserve traces of Tiriya’s former beneficial status, including the identification of Tir with Tishtar. However, the same source also states, conversely, that Tir should correspond to Apaosha. The later and still extant Zoroastrian custom of referring to the hymn dedicated to Tishtar as the Tir Yašt provides further evidence of the direct identification of their names and identities. The association of the two divinities was also reflected in the Zoroastrian religious calendar and its observances. Both Tir and Tishtar were venerated during the fourth month of the year and on the thirteenth day of each month. Related names for the day appear in several other Iranian calendars. In the Sogdian calendar, it was called tyš [tīš], as attested by al-Bīrūnī and documents from Mount Mugh. In the Parthian calendar, its name was tyry, while the Khwarazmian forms were tyry, attested at Tok-kala, and jyry, recorded by al-Bīrūnī.

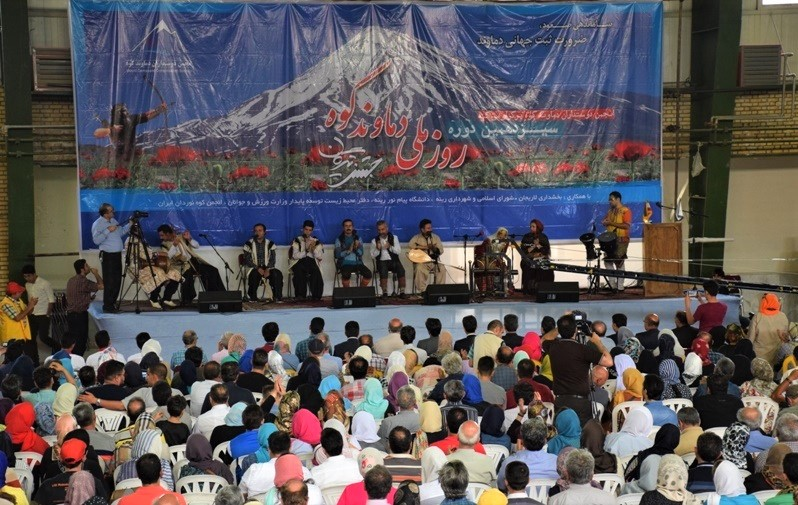
Tiragan festival in Amol, Iran

The month associated with Tishtar did not necessarily fall during the season of rainfall. The myth of his release of the waters may have accommodated the uncertain arrival of autumn rain in Iranian lands. That uncertainty has been offered as an explanation for the difference between the fourth calendar month, dedicated to Tishtar, and the season when the waters were believed to be released. Tiragān ranks among ancient Iran’s principal holy days and was chiefly a rain festival. Known as Tirikāna and in Pahlavi as Tiragān, it was among the major festivals maintained in Zoroastrian times. The festival bore Tiri’s name, but its Avestan liturgies addressed the rain-god Tishtar. In the Middle Persian preliminaries, which were always recited before the Avestan texts, the dedication (khšnūman) was instead addressed to Teštar-Tir, rāyömand, khwarrõmand (posessor of divine glory), meaning “Teštar-Tir, the splendid, the glorious”. Popularly known among the Zoroastrians of Iran as the “feast of Tir and Teštar”, Tiragān continued to be celebrated as a rain festival in Yazd and Kerman down to the century described by the source. Its observances included a number of practices intended to serve as rain-spells. The joint veneration of the two divinities also survived among Iranian Zoroastrians, who know the ancient festival of Tiragān as jašan-i Tir u Teštar, or the “feast of Tir and Teštar”, and maintain shrines dedicated to “Tir and Teštar”.

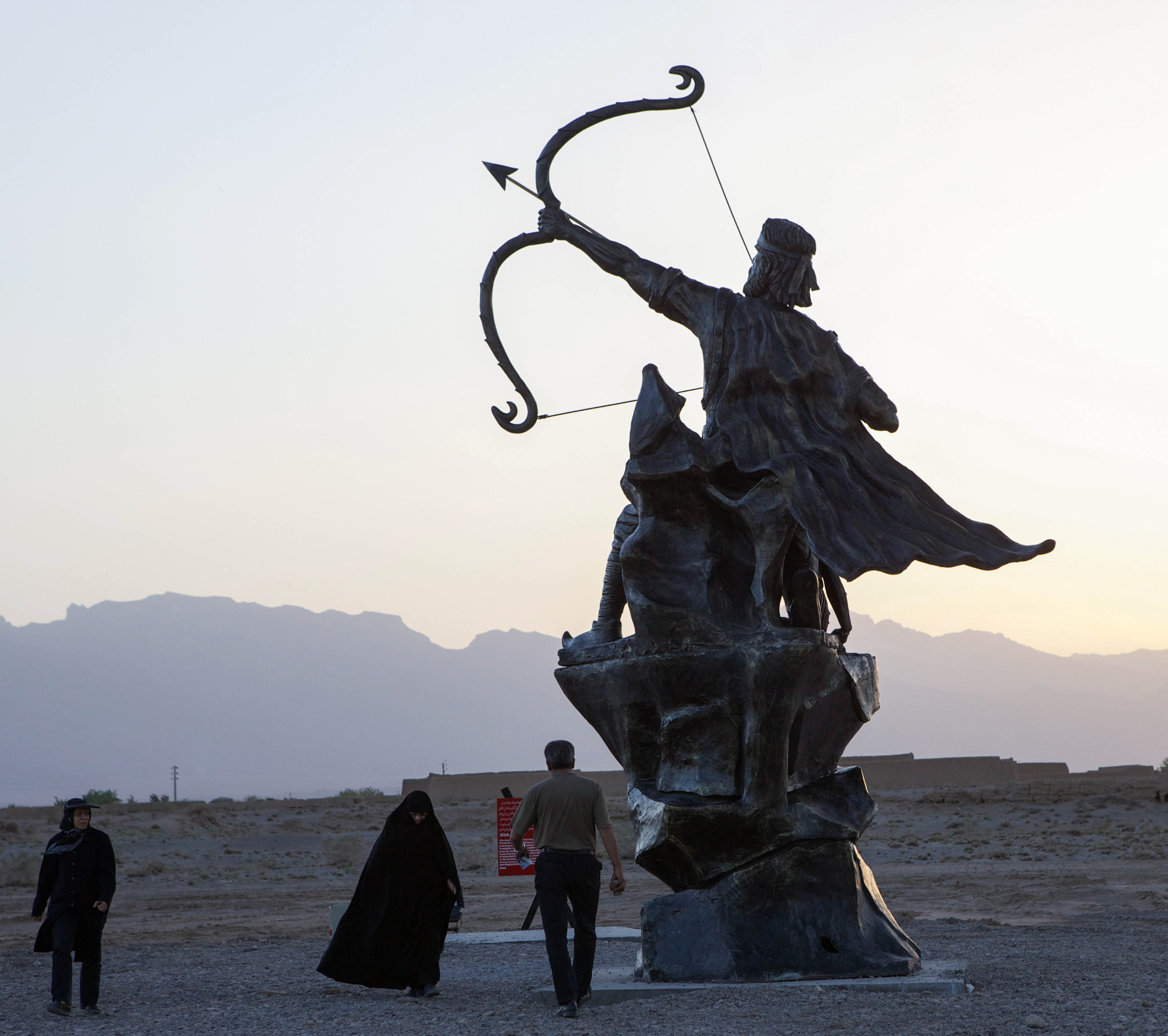
Statue of Arash the archer in Yazd, Iran

The arrow supplied another link between Tiri and Tishtar, alongside their connection with rain. The association of Tishtar with arrows formed part of a wider body of celestial symbolism connected with Sirius. In Mesopotamian celestial lore, Sirius was designated by terms meaning “arrow”, including the Sumerian KAK-SI-SÁ and the Akkadian šiltaḫu or šukūdu. Comparable imagery appears beyond Mesopotamia. In later Egypt, Sirius, known as Sōthis, was the target of an arrow shot by Sathis, while in Chinese celestial tradition, the celestial Emperor shot an arrow against the sky jackal, Sirius (Tīan láng). The symbolic association between Sirius and the heavenly arrow also appears in Indian and Iranian traditions. In India, Sirius was shot by the archers Tiásya or Rudra, whereas in Iran, Sirius corresponds to Tishtar himself. According to the Tishtar Yašt, Tishtar flies through the sky like an arrow shot by Arash, the most valiant archer of the Aryans.

The origin of Tiri’s own association with arrows remains disputed. The Old Iranian word for “arrow”, tigra, eventually developed into tir. However, evidence indicates that the word was still pronounced tigr until at least the third century CE. Long before this, Tiri appeared as TEIPO on Kušan coins, where he was represented, despite being a male divinity, in the form of Artemis with a bow and quiver. The association of Tiri with archery was also reflected in the traditions surrounding Tiragān. In Iranian tradition, the festival was regarded as commemorating the great arrow-shot of Arash, a tradition that probably dates back to Parthian times. One explanation is that the comparison in Tishtar’s Yašt first linked him with arrows, and that Tiri acquired the attribute only after the two gods were identified. According to this interpretation, the later correspondence between Tiri's name and the Persian word tir, meaning “arrow”, was coincidental.

== Iconography ==
Tir-Tishtar rendered in the image of the goddess Artemis

Kushan depictions name the deity ΤΕΙΡΟ (Teiro), a Bactrian feminine form related to the name of the western Iranian Zoroastrian god Tir. Teiro probably corresponded to Tir and possibly to the Avestan Tishtar. The deity was represented on Kushan coins as an archer, with an appearance based on the Greek goddess Artemis. One such representation occurs on a second-century CE gold coin of the Kushan ruler Huvishka, preserved in the British Museum. Although the deity was identified with a male Iranian divinity, Kushan artists portrayed Teiro with feminine features and clothing, including a clean-shaven face, long hair, and garments that led scholars to regard the figure as female. Using Greek visual models for Iranian divinities was a broader feature of Kushan coinage.

The proposed equation of Teiro with Tir and Tishtar forms part of the study of religious blending in Bactrian Zoroastrianism. The portrayal of Tir on Kushan coins as an archer has been interpreted as evidence of a connection with Tishtar. However, the name of the Bactrian deity cannot be derived from Tishtar and must instead derive from Tira-, or Tirī- in the case of the feminine Bactrian form. There is no firm evidence that Tir in Bactria had the same astronomical or astrological role attributed to him on the Iranian plateau. A stronger association with Artemis in Greco-Bactrian settings would, however, still allow for Kushan and other Bactrian understandings of Tir as a personified planet, star, or smaller heavenly body. Artemis was not Tir’s only Greek counterpart. In the Greek cultural milieu, Tir was also identified with Apollo, as explicitly attested by a bilingual Graeco-Parthian inscription on a second-century CE bronze statuette of Heracles from Seleucia.

Central Asian depictions of Tir and Tishtar also drew upon Mesopotamian imagery, alongside their Greek connections. Tir, the deity associated with the planet Mercury and connected with the Avestan rain-god Tishtar, was identified by Central Asian peoples with the Mesopotamian god Nabû, the patron of scribes and the original “husband” of Nana. This identification occurred despite the problematic relationship between Tir and Tishtar. Nabû's symbolic animal was the dragon known in Akkadian as mušḫuššu, whose appearance has been compared with the dragon depicted on a Khwarazmian silver bowl from Dagestan. In Sogdian art, the local Tish could be represented through the figure of Nabû, with Nabû’s stylus reworked as an arrow. The association with Nabû may also explain the appearance of the dragon alongside Tish, as the dragon was one of Nabû's symbolic attributes. A further comparison has been drawn with Apollo, who was likewise an archer and was sometimes depicted in Greek painted ceramics from the Black Sea region riding a griffin, an animal that could be regarded as a kind of dragon.

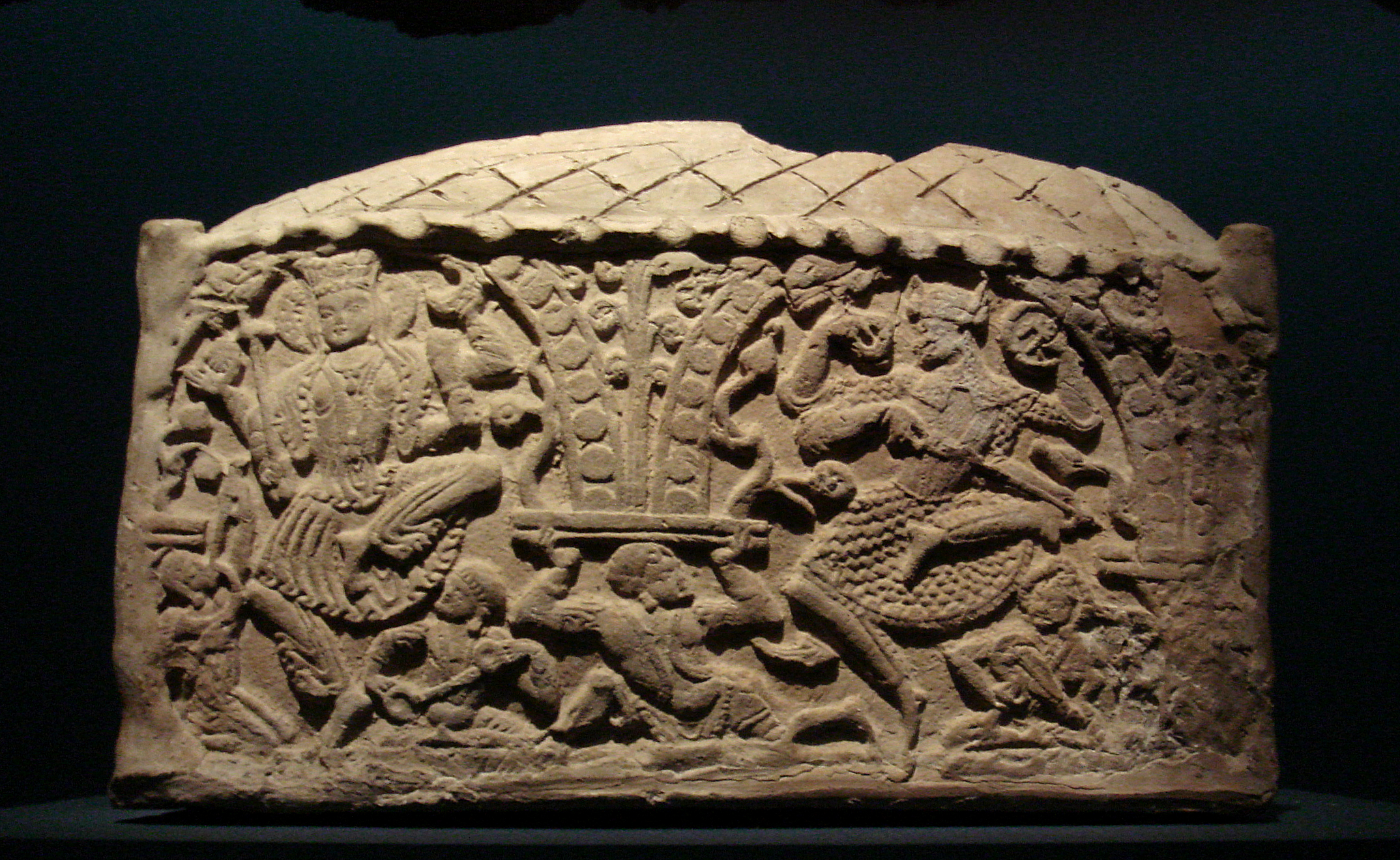
Tir-Tishtar (right) depicted with 4 arms, armored, and holding an arrow

Sogdian and Khwarazmian artists continued to reproduce ancient Mesopotamian iconographic traditions in their representations of local divinities, particularly those associated with the pair Nana and Nabû/Tishtar. From at least the second century CE, depictions of Tishtar, Tish, Teiro, or Tiri in Central Asia show feminine dress, for reasons that have yet to be explained.

The silver bowl from Dagestan, attributed to Khwarazmia, has been offered as an example of this tradition. Although the figure's feminine appearance led scholars to regard it as a goddess, it has been suggested that the image instead represents the rain-god Tishtar/Tiri, seated upon a dragon and holding an elongated object in the left hand, probably a stylized arrow. On this reading, the bowl belongs to a visual tradition lasting in Khwarazmia and elsewhere in Central Asia until Islamization, marked by three features: feminine clothing, a dragon, and an arrow. The presence of these features on Khwarazmian metalwork has also been attributed to the continued adaptation of Mesopotamian religious imagery within local cultural and religious traditions.

== Struggle against the forces of drought ==
The annual release of waters from Vourukaša is opposed by hostile powers whom Tishtar must overcome in Zoroastrian myth. His principal adversary is the demon Apaosha, “Death”, whom he confronts on the shores of the mythical sea. The waters of Vourukaša are replenished by the mythical river Harahvaiti, described as being as large as all the other streams flowing upon the earth combined. The Fravahars also gather at its shores to secure water for their kinsfolk.

Tishtar takes three forms in succession before his encounter with Apaosha, remaining in each for ten days. He first appears as a fifteen-year-old man, then as a bull with golden horns, and finally as a splendid white horse. In this final form, Tishtar is described as a beautiful white stallion (auruša-), with golden ears and muzzle, while Apaosha appears as a black (sāma-), hairless and hideous horse. It has also been suggested, although the relevant passage is unclear, that Vourukaša itself assumes the form of a mare, for whose possession the two stallions struggle.

Their first battle at the shore of Vourukaša ends in Tishtar’s defeat. After three days and nights of combat, Apaosha drives him back from the waters because the yazata has not received sufficient worship from the Aryans. Following his defeat, Tishtar laments the absence of worship, crying: “Woe to me! misery, O waters and plants! ... men do not worship me now”. He declares that, if properly worshipped, he would acquire the strength of ten horses, ten camels, ten bulls, ten mountains, and ten channelled streams. After receiving the necessary worship, he proclaims: “Well is me! well, O waters and plants! ... well shall it be, O lands!”, announcing that the waters will flow freely for large-seeded crops, small-seeded grasses, and the material world.

Ohrmazd also restores Tishtar’s strength by conducting an empowering yasna- for him. Empowered by this act of worship, Tishtar resumes his struggle against Apaosha and defeats him at midday, forcing the daeva to flee. The waters of Vourukaša are consequently freed and can be distributed among the seven karšvars (countries), with the assistance of the star Satavāesa. Following his victory, Tishtar rushes into the waters in the form of a horse, entering the bays, tributaries, and outlets of Vourukaša. As the Yašt describes, “Then the waters flow down ... from the sea Vourukaša.” Then “Tishtar rises again from the sea Vourukaša and the bold ... wind (Vāta-) drives the rain and cloud upon places, upon dwellings, upon the seven climes.”

Scholars have also read the struggle as a survival of an older myth about natural forces. Elsewhere in Iranian tradition, the waters flowing from Vourukaša are themselves personified as horses driven by Apąm Napat. Lommel suggested that the combat between Tishtar and Apaosha represents a struggle between rival stallions, in which the victor approaches the waters that desire him and begets the rain.

Apaosha is not the only heavenly adversary Tishtar faces. One of these is the witch Dužyāiryā, “Bad Harvest”, whom he must bind “with twofold bonds and threefold bonds ... as if a thousand men were to bind one man”. Another account describes his struggle against the Pairikās, led by the demoness Pairikā Dužyāiryā, “The Bad Year Witch”. These demonesses, supported by the Yātus, whose astronomical role remains unknown, were associated with the stārō kərəmå, generally interpreted as “worm stars”. An alternative interpretation treats the expression as the compound stārō.kərəmā-, possibly meaning “having starred worms” or “belonging to the star-worm showers”, although the reading remains disputed. In this account, Ahriman casts the Pairikās into the heavens to disrupt the apparently regular movements of the fixed stars, which were closely connected with rainfall and the return of the waters. Tishtar's duty was therefore to confront these malevolent beings during the night. He is described as one who “overcomes the pairikās, he conquers the pairikās who fall as shooting stars between earth and heaven”. Tishtar and the other stars were also designated afšciθra-, commonly understood as “having the seed/origin” of the waters or rains, although the expression may instead mean “having the brilliance of the waters/rains”. Tishtar, like Mithra, has also been described as capable of moving in and out of human time, as discussed by Kellens and Panaino.

Other heavenly beings support Tishtar in these conflicts. The Avestan tradition describes him as the “lord and overseer of all stars”, assisted by stars of a watery nature (afšciθra-). His subordinate stars include the Tishtarēni, identified with Canis Minor, the Paoiryaēnī, identified with the Pleiades, and the Upapaoiri, or “stars in front of the Pleiades”. The Tishtar Yašt also mentions the Tištryāeinī stars, which appear astronomically to correspond to Canis Minor but may additionally have been regarded as the “wives of Tishtar”. Satavāesa is especially important among Tishtar’s celestial helpers because of its part in spreading the waters. It has been tentatively identified with Fomalhaut (Alpha Piscis Austrini). According to the Pahlavi books, Tishtar shares the rule of the heavens with three other great stars or constellations. Tishtar himself governs the eastern quarter, while Satavāesa, identified in this account with Antares, governs the south and assists him by scattering rainwater across the earth. Together with Vanant and Haptōiringa, Tishtar and Satavāesa form a group of four celestial beings invoked in that order during Zoroastrian observances on the day of Tir in each month.

== Release and distribution of the waters ==
Zoroastrian accounts trace the waters of the world to the sea Vourukaša. From the mythical mountain of high Harā, associated with the great goddess Anaitis (βαρξοχάρα-), the waters of Arədvi flow into Vourukaša, from which other rivers carry them across the lands. Rain also originates in Vourukaša, from which it is released annually by Tishtar, the god of the rain-star.

Several divine beings take part in the successive stages through which rain reaches the world. According to Kellens, Tishtar must first ascend toward the firmament, escape the network of shooting stars, and gain control of the celestial reservoir of waters. The star Sadwesh then drives the mists rising from this reservoir toward the earth, after which the wind stirs the clouds across the sky. Apąm Napat and the Khwarrah, the forces present in the waters, distribute them among the different regions. Only after these processes have taken place do the Faravahar cause the rain to fall.

Wind is another agent in the movement of rain across the world. After Tishtar rises again from the sea Vourukaša, the wind (Vāta-) drives the rain and clouds over the lands, including their settlements and the seven climes, as expressed in the description that the wind “drives the rain and cloud upon places, upon dwellings, upon the seven climes”.

The division of these duties can also be seen in the helpers assigned to the Amehraspands. Khordad, who cares for water, has as her hamkārs (helpers) Tishtar and Vata, who bring rain, together with the Fravahars, who distribute it. Similarly, Amordad, the guardian of plants, is assisted by Zam, the yazata of the earth.

Tishtar’s yearly release of rain also explains how plants are renewed. In the Zoroastrian creation story, the first plant withers after being poisoned by the Evil Spirit. Amordad, the immortal who protects vegetation, reduces the dead plant to fragments. Rain spreads its substance over the earth, where plants arise from it; their seeds in turn give rise to the Tree of All Seeds in Vourukaša. This account has been interpreted as an artificial combination of an older popular myth with later priestly doctrines.

The Tree of All Seeds returns in the account of how the world’s vegetation is renewed each year. Each year, Tishtar takes seeds from the Tree together with the waters of Vourukaša so that he may “rain (them) upon the world with the rain”, thereby renewing plant life throughout the earth. Tishtar held a significant place in worship as well as in mythology. In addition to having a Yašt dedicated to him, he is venerated after Mithra in the Khoršēd Niyāyeš, a prayer recited three times daily. Despite this prominence, no known personal names are formed from the name Tishtar. By contrast, numerous names containing Tiri- or Tir- as their first element are attested.

== See also ==
- Tir (god)
