= Apaosha =

Avestan language name of Zoroastrianism's demon of drought

Apaosha (Apaoša, Apauša) is the Avestan language name of Zoroastrianism's demon of drought. He is the epitomized antithesis of Tishtrya, divinity of the star Sirius and guardian of rainfall. In Zoroastrian tradition, Apaosha appears as Aposh or Apaush.

For many decades, the Avestan common noun apaosha- "drought" was thought to derive from either *apa-uša- "burning away" or *apa-vṛt(a)- "stemming the waters." In the late 1960s, it was proposed that apaoša- was the antonym of an unattested derivative of *pauša- "thriving". This explanation, which is also supported by Old Indic póṣa with the same meaning, is today well accepted. Avestan apaoša- thus originally meant "not thriving".

== In the Avesta ==
In the mythology described in the Tishtar Yasht (Yt. 8.21-29), Tishtrya, as a mighty white horse with golden ears and golden tail, rushes towards the cosmic sea Vourukhasha. On his way, he is confronted by Apaosha as a horrible black horse with black ears and black tail. They battle for three days and nights until Apaosha drives Tishtrya away. Tishtrya then complains to Ahura Mazda that he was weakened because humankind did not give him his due of proper prayers and sacrifices. Ahura Mazda then himself offers sacrifice to Tishtrya, who now strengthened reengages Apaosha in battle at noon and conquers the demon of drought. Tishtrya then causes the rains to fall freely upon the earth and all is well again.

This legend has been interpreted to be a mythological conflation of a seasonal and astronomical event: The heliacal rising of Sirius (with which Tishtrya is associated) occurred in July,^{[a]} just before the hottest and driest time of the year. For the next few days, Sirius is visible at dawn as a glimmering star (doing battle with Apaosha). In the torrid summer months, as Sirius becomes more directly visible, the light of the star appears to grow stronger (Tishtrya gathering strength) until it is steadily visible in the firmament (Apaosha vanquished). With the defeat of Apaosha, the rainy season begins (in late autumn).

A mythological explanation of the heliacal setting of Sirius is only alluded to in the Avesta: In Yasht 18.5-6, Apaosha is contrasted with the bringers of prosperity, that is, Tishtrya and his assistants Vata and Khwarrah. In these verses, the demon of drought is described as the "numbing frost."

== In tradition ==
The description of the battle between Apaosha and Tishtrya is reproduced in the 9th-12th century texts of Zoroastrian tradition, where Apaosha now appears as Middle Persian Aposh (apōš), and Tishtrya is now Tishtar or Tishter.

In the Bundahishn, a cosmological fable completed in the 12th century, the opposition is established during the creation: the second phase of the war between creation (with its guardians) and Angra Mainyu (MP→ Ahriman) is over control of the waters and of the rains. In this war (Bundahishn 7.8-10, and Zadspram 6.9-11), Apaosha is assisted by Spenjagr, who is however defeated by a bolt of lightning. On the opposing front, Tishtrya is supported by Verethragna (→ Vahman), Haoma (→ Hom), Apam Napat (→ Burz), the hordes of the fravashis and by the Vayu (→ Weh). In the Bundahishn, Apaosha is identified with the planet Mercury, the astrological opposition to Sirius being a product of the contact with Chaldea, and which may be a lingering trace of the Zurvanite doctrine that places stars in opposition to planets.

Dadistan i denig 93 reiterates Apaosha's attempt to prevent rain. Upon being defeated by Tishtrya, Apaosha then attempts to make the rains cause damage (93.12). Dadistan i denig 93 provides a folk etymology of Aposh as Middle Persian ab osh "(having) the destruction of water."

== Notes ==
- The heliacal rising of Sirius presently occurs in early August. But 2500 years ago, it occurred about two weeks earlier. See precession of the equinoxes.
