= Goshurvan =

Soul of the primordial bovine of Zoroastrian cosmogony and cosmology

Goshurvan Avestan: 𐬔𐬇𐬎𐬱 𐬎𐬭𐬎𐬎𐬀𐬥
- Soul of the cow, god of all four-legged creatures
- Possible depiction of Goshurvan on a Sassanian seal
- Other names: Gosh, Gosh Urvan, Geush Uruun, Goshurun, Goshorun, Geush, Gav Ravan
- Affiliation: The Thirty-Three Deities, Guardians of the Days of the Month
- Symbol: Zebu bull
- Attributes: Soul of the primordial cow, cumulative soul of consecrated animals, the primordial bull, protector of good creation
- Day: 14th day of every month in the Zoroastrian calendar
- Texts: Gosh Yasht, Bundahishn
- Gender: Female and male
- Associated deities: Mithra, Mah, Bahman, Haoma

Equivalents
- Hindu: Kamadhenu
- Egyptian: Apis (deity)

Goshurvan (Avestan: Gə̄uš Uruuan, “Soul of the Cow”, Middle Persian: Goshurun) also known as Gosh is a yazata personifying the soul of the primordial cow, and god of all four-legged creatures in Zoroastrianism. Her suffering is the subject of Yasna 29, the Gathic poem commonly known as the “Cow's Lament”. In that dialogue the Cow calls for a saviour and encounters divine beings including Goshtashan, the Fashioner of the Cow. In sacrificial tradition Goshurvan receives the spirits of consecrated animals at death. This role has been connected with the proposed origin of the divinity as a collective animal soul. Later Pahlavi accounts associate Goshurvan with Gav-e Ewdad, the primordial bovine slain by Ahriman, from whose body Goshurvan emerges as its soul. The primordial bovine's seed gives rise to beneficent animals. Goshurvan is invoked with Goshtashan in Zoroastrian liturgy and serves as a fellow-worker of Bahman, the guardian of cattle.

== Names and origins ==
Goshurvan names the archetypal bovine whose suffering is the subject of a Gathic poem, Yasna 29, commonly called “the Cow's Lament”. The poem draws on an older Indo-Iranian motif of a semi-divine cow. Avestan gau- is grammatically feminine but can denote cattle or bovines generally, rather than necessarily a female animal, as also recognized in scholarly interpretation. A distinct name, Gav-e Ewdad, also written ēwagdād, belongs to the primordial Bovine of Zoroastrian mythology. Its Avestan form, gav- aēvō.dātā-, occurs in Nīāyišn 3.2 and Sīh rōzag 2.12. There it appears with måŋha- gaociθra-, “the Moon containing the seed of cattle”, and gaw- pouru.sarəδā, “the Bovine of many species”. Beyond these litanies, information about the primordial Bovine comes from the Pahlavi books, particularly the Bundahishn and the Wizīdagīhā ī Zādspram.

In the remote pastoral period of the Indo-Iranian peoples, when communities depended upon their cattle herds, the customary sacrificial animal was probably the cow or bull. The bovine remained the most highly regarded offering, both because it was costly and because of the religious symbolism attached to the Bull's first creative sacrifice.

Goshurvan and Haoma have been understood as cult divinities of pre-Zoroastrian Iran, distinct from gods of abstract qualities or natural phenomena, whose emergence was connected with repeated acts of ritual worship. Goshurvan, “the Soul of the Bull”, was thus conceived as the sum of the souls of sacrificed animals, formed through the repeated release of individual spirits. In this proposed explanation of the divinity's origin, the spirit of each consecrated animal was believed to be absorbed into Goshurvan. Another reconstruction holds that consecrated animal souls, like human souls, originally travelled downward into the hereafter to graze in the shadowy pastures of “Yima of the good herds”. On this interpretation, urvan originally denoted a disembodied spirit dwelling beneath the earth. In a later theological identification Goshurvan was treated as the soul of the Uniquely-created Bull (Gav-e Ewdad), from whose seed all animal bodies originated and to whose soul their own returned at death, establishing a cycle and unity between the primordial being and subsequent animal life.

The Pahlavi books distinguish consecrated sacrifice from unlawful killing, describing the taking of life outside sacrifice devoted to divine beings as the sin of “destroying existence” (būdyõzadih). Religious rites were therefore prescribed even when wild animals were killed.

== Goshurvan ==
Goshurvan was the divinity with whom the spirit of an animal sacrificed according to the proper rites became united at death. In a later arrangement of divine helpers, Goshurvan served alongside Mah, the Moon divinity, as a hamkār or fellow-worker of Bahman, guardian of cattle. Mah held the seed of the Uniquely-created Bull.

The Yasna Haptanghāiti, a part of the Zoroastrian liturgy once accompanying the central act of blood sacrifice, attests the attention given to the victim's soul in Iranian and Indian sacrificial traditions. Its worshippers revere “Goshurvan and Goshtashan, then our souls and (those) of the domestic animals which nourish us ... and the souls of useful wild animals”. Goshtashan and Goshurvan continued to be invoked together, particularly during animal offerings. Another sacrificial divinity mentioned by Zoroaster is Ižā, a term denoting both sacrifice and the yazata of sacrifice and corresponding to Vedic Idā.

Druvāspā was another divinity regularly associated with Goshurvan and Goshtashan. Her name appears originally to have been an epithet meaning “possessing sound horses”. Haoma, although himself the divine sacrificer, was described as compassionate toward the animals he nourished through plants. He was also concerned that the required rituals should be performed so that their souls could reach their appointed place in the hereafter. For this reason he was regarded, together with Goshurvan and Goshtashan, as a divinity with a particular charge over animals. In later Avestan literature Gə̄uš Uruuan was the divinity of the fourteenth day of the month, known in Middle Persian as Gōš.

Animals slaughtered in droves without the prescribed rites were thought not to ascend to Goshurvan, whose strength and gladness, and thereby the good of the whole physical creation, depended on properly consecrated animal souls. Some practices rejected as daēvic were understood as propitiatory rites directed at appeasing evil powers, a form of conciliation that Zoroaster's religion was praised for rejecting. One such reported Old Persian practice involved pounding a herb called omomi in a mortar while invoking Hades and darkness. The mixture was then combined with the blood of a slaughtered wolf, carried to a place without sunlight, and cast away. Comparable propitiatory rites were performed daily among Brahmans. Of the five obligatory “great offerings” (mahāyajñāḥ) made twice a day by householders, one was an offering to demons placed by the household rubbish-heap. In high rituals, blood from an animal sacrifice could be offered to the powers of darkness by pouring it into a hole in the ground west of the vedi, or sacrificial altar.

Bovine sacrifice continued in Iranian Zoroastrian practice long after the period of the ancient texts. Even in conditions of poverty, the Zoroastrians of Yazd made a yearly cow or bull offering at what appears to have been an ancient shrine to the waters, a practice lasting until the late nineteenth century. Horse sacrifice also came to be highly valued after the domestication of the horse among the Indians and Iranians, probably after 2000 BCE. In the Yašts, horses are regularly included among the animals offered by kings and heroes. Historical accounts associate horse offerings especially with the Sun. The rationale was described as giving “to the swiftest of the gods, the swiftest of all mortal creatures”. Horses also seem to have been sacrificed for the souls of illustrious dead people, with the intention of ensuring them a place in a paradise illuminated by the Sun. The Avesta sometimes specifies the kind of animal appropriate as an offering to a particular deity.

At Mehregan, Zoroastrians in some Iranian villages brought offerings from their crops to a fire temple, after which each household sacrificed an animal to the god Mithra. Besides thanksgiving, this blood sacrifice may have symbolically re-enacted the death of the mythical Uniquely-created Bull (Gav-e Ewdad), from whose body came the seeds of animals and useful plants, in the hope that corn and grasses would sprout again under the quickening Sun and new offspring would be born to the herds.

One proposed parallel is the bull sacrifice to Apollo at the Athenian Bouphonia, where renewal of natural life has likewise been suggested as a purpose. Similar explanations have been advanced for seasonal sacrifices performed by other peoples at harvest celebrations. In this interpretation, “the periodical return of the sacrifice at times when the earth became bare assured the continuity of natural life”. Such a meaning for the blood sacrifice at the Mithrakāna has been proposed to explain its central place in the festival and its persistence into the twentieth century. It has also been suggested as a possible explanation for the essential role of bull sacrifice in western Mithraism. In Iran, the Mihr Yašt permits the offering of any domestic animal to Mithra, since every useful creature represents the Uniquely-created Bull. The sacrifice of cows or bulls itself became more closely associated in ritual with Anahita, possibly because the cow and her milk were connected with fertility and libations to the waters. Animal sacrifice was a general feature of worship of the Iranian deities, but it had a particularly significant place in Mithra's cult, giving Mithra a special association with the divine sacrificer Haoma.

== Gav-e Ewdad ==
The Uniquely-created Bull, Avestan Gav aevō.dāta and Middle Persian Gāv ī ēw-dād, was the first animal to live on earth and the source of later animal life, counted as the fifth creation in one Zoroastrian sequence. “White, bright like the moon, and three measured poles in height”, it lived beside the river Veh Dāitī, opposite Gayō.marətan (Middle Persian: Gayōmard), the mythical First Man, before being slain.

The precise meaning of the bovine's name remains uncertain, although its second element has been interpreted as “sole-created” or “created as one”. Unlike the Avestan term, Middle Persian gāw has no grammatical gender, leaving the creature's sex to be determined from context. The Bundahishn portrays Gav-e Ewdad as hermaphroditic, like the primordial man Gayōmard, because it has semen (manuscript TD2 94.4) and milk (TD2 43.15). In another enumeration it was the fourth of Ohrmazd's primal creations, made to be the progenitor of all beneficent animals, just as the primordial Plant (urwar) and Gayōmard contained the potential for subsequent plants and human beings.

In the Zoroastrian version of the myth, the Evil Spirit Ahriman attacked the good creation and killed the primordial bovine, just as he caused the original Plant to wither. This is the only form of the account known from Iran. At the onslaught, Ohrmazd gave Gav-e Ewdad bang to eat in order to lessen its suffering at Ahriman's hands. When the creature succumbed, it fell to the right, and Goshurvan emerged from its body as its soul. In later Pahlavi literature, Goshurvan is described as the female counterpart of the primordial Bull.

Part of the bovine's seed was carried to the Moon-station, corresponding to the lunar epithet gao.čithra, “having the seed of the Bull”. Purified there, it gave rise to male and female pairs of all the many species of beneficent animals, called gōspandān ī purr-sardag in Pahlavi and gav- pouru.sarəδā- in Avestan. Another portion fell to the earth and produced many kinds of useful plants.

The Bundahishn also describes fifty-five kinds of grain and twelve kinds of medicinal plants growing from the dead bovine's marrow because of its “plant-nature”, urwar-cihrīh. Drawing on another tradition, it names sesame, lentils, leeks, grapes, mustard seed, and marjoram as issuing from various parts of Gav-e Ewdad's body.

The myth has been regarded as containing anomalies, particularly when compared with a proposed earlier pre-Zoroastrian version in which the Bull died through a creative and beneficial sacrifice, generating other good creatures and plants. It has also been suggested that this original sacrifice was the model for Mithra's annual autumn festival offering, intended to renew the pastures and herds in spring. In the Zoroastrian account of the six creations, by contrast, the Bull's death yields good results but is itself an evil act committed by Ahriman. Both the Zoroastrian myth and the proposed older version contain a further inconsistency. Plants grow from the dead Bull although the fourth creation has already accounted for their origin. This has been explained as an old anomaly arising from the combination of diverse myths into one creation scheme.

== Goshtashan ==
Goshtashan, “Creator of the Cow” or “Creator of the Bull” (both meanings being possible in Avestan), was a divine figure mentioned by Zoroaster and invoked with Goshurvan in the Yasna Haptanghāiti, a pairing that continued in Zoroastrian ritual. He was also invoked in association with the Gathic Amehraspands. In the Gathas he appears alone in Yasna 29.2, with Aša in 46.9, and with Ārmaiti in 31.9. Although prominent in the Gathas, he receives little independent description of his character or functions and falls into relative obscurity in the Younger Avesta. The deity was associated with the fourteenth day of the month, called Gosh in Middle Persian.

The Fashioner is generally identified with the older Indo-Iranian creative figure Θβōrəštar or Thworəštar, etymologically the same name as Vedic Tvaṣṭṛ and apparently also used by Zoroaster. In the Vedas this Fashioner was the smith of the gods and the maker of living beings. It has been proposed that pre-Zoroastrian Iran, like Vedic India, knew several creator gods. Within that reconstruction, Zoroaster's apparent recognition of Thworəštar as Goshtashan would give the older figure a particular creative function, perhaps as a servant of Ohrmazd to whom that specialized power had been delegated. Outside the Gathas, however, thworaštar occurs only twice, apparently referring both times to Ohrmazd himself, perhaps in emphasis on the Zoroastrian doctrine of one supreme Creator.

Another interpretation identifies Goshtashan with Ohrmazd himself and with his creative aspect, Sepanta Minu, “the Most Beneficent Spirit”. In Yasna 29.1 Goshurvavn asks, “Who fashioned me?” (kə̄ mā tašaṱ). Yasna 44.6 answers in an address to Ohrmazd, “thou ... hast fashioned the Cow” (gąm tašō). The same attribution appears in Yasna 51.7 through the agency of Spə̄ništa Mainyu. In Yasna 47.3, the Spirit alone is the one “who hath fashioned the Cow” (yə̄..gąm..hə̄m.tašaṱ). The Cow also asks in Yasna 29.1, “For whom have you crafted me?” (kahmāi mā θβarōždūm). In 29.6 Ohrmazd replies, “Craftsman fashioned you for the husbandman and the herdsman” (aṱ zī θβā fšuiiantaēcā vāstrāicā θβōrəštā tataša). This association with the Indo-Iranian demiurge Θβōrəštar, Vedic Tvaṣṭar, has been interpreted as a sign of the Fashioner's inherited origin.

In the Gathic poems Zoroaster developed a new religious vision, daēnā, through the reinterpretation of inherited concepts.

== The Cow's Lament ==
In the Avesta, the suffering bovine of Yasna 29 appears to be a cow rather than an unspecified animal, an understanding supported by comparison with Vedic and Indian epic traditions. The Gathic poem is cast as a dialogue between Goshurvan and several divine beings, including Goshtashan, the Fashioner of the Cow. In this “Cow's Lament”, Goshurvan is understood as the “Soul of Creation”, crying out in anguish for a saviour.

In an ethical interpretation of the Gathic appeal, Zoroaster comes to earth to secure justice and righteousness for all creation through Asha, the divine law or Cosmic Truth, which demands just treatment of every aspect of existence and harmony without exploitation or degradation. This reading sets Zoroaster's supposed Bronze Age concern for the rights of plants, animals, minerals, and water, and the reverent care of the Spenta or Bounteous Creation, against the continuing struggle for human rights in the twenty-first century.

== Religious meaning and interpretations ==
The “passion and cruelty” suffered by cattle in Yasna 29.1 has been interpreted as referring not to properly performed sacrifice, in which both flesh and spirit were consecrated for the common good, but to the destruction of pastures described in Yasna 32.9, disorderly slaughter in 32.12, and the driving away of herds. These were realities of Zoroaster's time and place that also symbolized the suffering of goodness more generally. The Cow's words have been interpreted on at least two levels, the more immediate being the inherited image of a suffering cow mistreated by enemies and representing the troubles of Zoroaster's community and its cult.

The wish to possess a “luck-bringing cow” in Yasna 47.3 or a “cow in calf” in 46.19 symbolizes wholesome increase and the state of being spənta, or bounteous, and has been interpreted as a longing for goodness, to become ashavan, or righteous, and enter the kingdom of heaven. Through this imagery a righteous person could also be called a “herdsman” (vāstrya).

A further, more abstract and particularly significant interpretation treats Goshurvan as a metaphor for the poetic or religious vision, daēnā, received by Zoroaster from Ohrmazd. This raises the question of why the divine craftsman is specifically the Fashioner of the Cow. In Vedic poetic usage a cow could itself serve as a metaphor for poetry. The Vedic root takṣ- and Avestan taš- describe the making of material objects, including chariots and things associated with horses, but are also used of speech when poets describe composing their works. The connection between Avestan vacastašti-, a stanza of the Gathas, and Greek epeōntektōn has been used to recognize the Indo-European expression wekwos- tekó-, “to fashion speech”. In the resulting interpretation, Zoroaster substitutes the metaphorical gav- for the traditional vacah- to create the “Fashioner of the Cow”, understood as an older *vacahah tašan-, “Fashioner of Speech”. Ohrmazd is therefore portrayed as the master poet who inspires the religious vision of the human poet.

In a modern ecological interpretation, Zoroaster's vision of a world ordered by Asha answers Goshurvan's appeal as the “Soul of Creation”, understood as Mother Earth's plea. This reading criticizes human-centred utilitarianism and a measure of progress based solely on material accumulation, which are presented as having destroyed species and made even the air of cities unfit to breathe.

== See also ==
- Gou Mata
- Auðumbla, a primeval cow in Norse mythology
- Sacred bull
- Tauroctony
- Dema Deity

== Bibliography ==
- Boyce, Mary (1975), A History of Zoroastrianism, vol. 1, Leiden: Brill, pp. 138–139.
- Malandra, William (2001a), "Gāwī ēwdād", Encyclopaedia Iranica, vol. 10, Costa Mesa, CA: Mazda, p. 340.
- Malandra, William (2001b), "Gə̄uš Uruuan", Encyclopaedia Iranica, vol. 10, Costa Mesa, CA: Mazda, p. 577.
