= Gaokerena =

Mythical Zoroastrian plant

In Persian and Zoroastrian legends, the mighty Gaokerena was a mythic Haoma plant that had healing properties and gave immortality to the resurrected bodies of the dead when eaten. It is also said to have the seeds of all trees on Earth and that the juice from its fruit gave the elixir of immortality. The name Gaokerena means "ox horn" or "cow ear".

== Simurgh roosting on the tree ==
According to Iranian mythology the Simurgh roosted on the Gaokerena.

== Failed attempts to destroy the tree and protection of the tree by a donkey ==
Evil naturally tried to destroy this life-giving tree and formed a lizard or frog to attack it and prevent all trees from growing on Earth. But it was protected by the ten Kara fish and a donkey with nine mouths and six eyes.

== Deathless status of those resurrected by the tree ==
At the resurrection, those who drink of the life-giving juice of this plant will obtain perfect welfare, including deathlessness.

== Similarity to other Trees of Life ==
It bears similarity to the Biblical and Islamic Tree of Life.
