= Zoroastrian festivals =

Zoroastrian religious commemorations

Zoroastrianism has numerous festivals and holy days, all of which are bound to the Zoroastrian calendar. The Shahenshahi and Kadmi variants of the calendar do not intercalate leap years and hence the day of the Gregorian calendar year on which these days are celebrated shifts ahead with time. The third variant of the Zoroastrian calendar, known as either Fasli (in India) or Bastani (in Iran), intercalates according to Gregorian calendar rules and thus remains synchronous with the seasons. For details on the differences, see Zoroastrian calendar.

== Seasonal festivals ==
Six irregularly-spaced seasonal festivals, called gahanbars (meaning "proper season"), are celebrated during the religious year. The six festivals are additionally associated with the six "primordial creations" of Ahura Mazda, otherwise known as the Amesha Spentas, and through them with aspects of creation (the sky, the waters, the earth, plant life, animal life, humankind). Due to the peculiarities of the Shahenshahi and Kadmi variants of the Zoroastrian calendar, which do not intercalate and are therefore no longer synchronized with the seasons, the seasonal festivals are actually celebrated many months in advance. The six festivals are:

- Maidyozarem Gahanbar (literally: 'midgreening'), originally celebrated as a mid-spring festival.
- Maidyoshahem Gahanbar ('midsummer'), originally celebrated on the summer solstice.
- Paitishahem Gahanbar ('bringing in the corn'), originally celebrated as a harvest festival.
- Ayathrem Gahanbar ('bringing home (the herds)'), originally celebrated at the end of autumn.
- Maidyarem Gahanbar ('mid-year'), originally celebrated on the winter solstice.
- Hamaspathmaidyem Gahanbar (for which there is no generally accepted literal meaning), celebrating mankind.
  This gagambar is not a seasonal festival in the technical sense, but rather commemorates the souls of the dead at the end of the religious year. It is better known as frawardigan.

In the present day, each of these festivals is celebrated over five days, except Hamaspathmaidyem Gahambar, which is held over ten days (two five-day periods, see "other holy days" below).

Originally, these seasonal festivals were celebrated on one day each, and were synchronous with the seasons. The Zoroastrian calendar was originally a 360-day luni-solar calendar, and also without intercalation, with the result that the seasons and the seasonal festivals gradually drifted apart. A first calendar reform (of uncertain date) introduced five epagomenal days at the end of the year, with the result that each festival then had two dates: one in the old 360-day calendar, and one in the new 365-day calendar. These apparently caused some confusion, and at some point the old and new festival days were joined as six-day-long observations (later reduced to five). Additionally, Hamaspathmaidyem Gahanbar, originally held on the last day of the year, came to be held on the last days of the last month of the year and on the new five epagomena days at the end of the new 360-day year, for a total of ten days. A second reform, in the 4th or 5th century, introduced a one-month intercalation every 120 years, abruptly realigned the calendar such that the year began again on the spring equinox, and the Gahanbars were again in accord with the seasons. However, following the collapse of the Sassanian state, after which Zoroastrianism had no central authority to govern intercalation, the practice was not maintained. As a result, in living Zoroastrianism, the Gahanbar are again no longer synchronous with the seasons.

== Name-day feasts ==
There are fifteen name-day feasts in a Zoroastrian religious year. Each of these feasts is held on the day(s) on which the day-of-the-month/month-of-the-year dedications to a yazata intersect. Eleven of these intersections are dedicated to individual yazatas, and four intersections are dedicated to Ahura Mazda. A special Yasna or Jashan (meaning "worship", "oblation") service is then held in honor of the respective yazata on those day/month intersections.

Four of the name-day feasts are dedicated to Dae "Creator" (Ahura Mazda), who has the tenth month of the year plus four days per month dedicated to Him (1st, 8th, 15th, 23rd day of the month). Accordingly, the 1st, 8th, 15th, 23rd day of the tenth month are each feast-days of Ahura Mazda, and each of those four days is called Jashan of Dadvah ("Creator").

Six of the Jashan days are dedicated to the six Ameshaspands (Amesha Spentas). These six days are respectively:

- Jashan of Bahman, celebrating animal creation. 2nd day of the 11th month (January 16)
- Jashan of Ardavisht, celebrating fire and all other luminaries. 3rd day of the 2nd month (April 22)
- Jashan of Shahrevar, celebrating metals and minerals. 4th day of the 6th month (August 21)
- Jashan of Spendarmad, celebrating the earth. 5th day of the 12th month (February 18)
- Jashan of (K)Hordad, celebrating the waters. 6th day of the 3rd month (May 25)
- Jashan of Amurdad, celebrating plant creation. 7th day of the 5th month (July 25)

Dates in parentheses are the Fasli/Bastani calendar dates.

Another five name-day feasts are dedicated to other yazatas with a single name/month dedication:

- Jashan of Farvardin (not to be confused with Farwardigan), celebrates the Fravashis on the 19th day of the 1st month (April 8)
- Jashan of Tir, also known as Tiregan, celebrates Tishtrya and the rains, on the 13th day of the 4th month (July 1).
- Jashan of Aban, also known as Abanegan, celebrates Apas, the waters, in particular of Aredvi Sura Anahita. It falls on the 9th day of the 8th month (October 26).
- Jashan of Adar, also known as Adaregan, celebration of Atar, fire. Adargan falls on the 10th day of 9th month (November 24).
- Jashan of Mihr, also known as Mehregan, celebrating Mithra on the 16th day of the 7th month (October 2).

== Other holy days ==
Other holy days include:

- Nouruz, New Year's Day. In the Fasli/Bastani variant of the Zoroastrian calendar, this day is always the day of the spring equinox (nominally falling on March 21).
  In the Shahenshahi and Kadmi yuppa, which do not account for leap years, the New Year's Day has drifted ahead by over 200 days. These latter two variants of the calendar, which are only followed by the Zoroastrians of India, celebrate the spring equinox as Jamshed-i Nouroz, with New Year's Day then being celebrated in July/August as Pateti (see below).
- Frawardigan (also known as Hamaspathmaidyem Gahambar, mukhtad or panji) is a 10-day period during which the souls of the dead (i.e. the fravashi) are commemorated. The ten days of Frawardigan span the last five days of the last month of the year, plus the five intercalary days ("Gatha" days) between the last month of the year and first month of the next year. Among Indian Zoroastrians, an extended mukhtad of eighteen days is also observed.
- Pateti, "(day) of penitence" (from patet "confession," hence also repentance and penitence). This is actually a day of introspection, and originally occurred on the last day (or on the last 5 days) of the calendar year. For reasons related to single day occasions being observed over six days, (the last day of) Pateti came to fall on (the first day of) the New Year's Day celebrations, and in India (Shahenshahi/Kadmi calendars) came to be "celebrated" on New Year's Day itself. Although the name has been retained, Pateti is no longer a day of introspection.
- Sadeh, a mid-winter festival traditionally celebrated 100 days (hence sadeh) after the first day of winter, or alternatively, 50 days (100 days and nights) before New Year's Day. Because this festival involves building a bonfire, it is also called Adar-Jashan.
- Zartosht No-Diso, the death anniversary of Zarathushtra, which is celebrated on the 11th day (Khorshed) of the 10th month (Dae). In the seasonal calendar, Zoroaster's death anniversary falls on December 26.
- Khordad Sal, which celebrates the birth anniversary of Zoroaster. It falls on the 6th day ([K]hordad) of the 1st month (Farvardin). In the seasonal calendar, Zoroaster's birth anniversary falls on March 26.

== Sources ==
- Boyce, Mary (1999). "Festivals: Zoroastrian". Encyclopedia Iranica. Vol. 9. Costa Mesa: Mazda.
