= Frawardigan =

Zoroastrian calendar period

Frawardigan is a ten-day period at the end of the Zoroastrian religious year during which the souls of the dead are commemorated.

The name frawardigan is a Zoroastrian Middle Persian (𐭯𐭫𐭥𐭫𐭲𐭩𐭪𐭭) allusion to the fravashis, which—among other aspects (including the souls of the living and the not-yet born)—also include the souls of the dead. The practice is however much older than this name, and it is already attested in the Avesta, specifically Yasht 13.49, where it is called Hamaspathmaidyem in Avestan, of uncertain meaning. In modern times the festival is also called mukhtad or panji, and in English "all souls" festival.

Like all other Zoroastrian festivals, Frawardigan was originally a one-day festival, in this case observed on the last day of the religious year. That day, the last day of the religious year, is now known as Pateti, from patet, "confession", a day of self-reflection prior to the celebration of Zoroastrian New Year's Day. As is also the case for other Zoroastrian festivals, the calendar reforms initiated during the 3rd or 4th century resulted in the one-day observance being extended to a five-day observance, in this case during the last five days of the twelfth month. The calendar reforms also introduced five intercalary days ("Gatha" days) following the twelfth month, and so, because the "all souls" festival was conventionally observed on the last day of the year, the festival was then also observed during the newly introduced last days of the year, i.e. the five intercalary days.

Taken together, Frawardigan thus came to span the last five days of the last month of the religious year (called the "lesser five" days of Frawardigan), plus the "greater five" intercalary days at the end of the religious year. Among Indian Zoroastrians, an extended mukhtad of eighteen days is also observed. Frawardigan should not be confused with Fraward Jashan, which is a name-day feast celebrated on the 19th day (named frawarden) of the 6th month (also frawarden) of the Zoroastrian calendar.

In medieval times, as known from Al-Biruni's 10th-century Chronology, for the ten days before Zoroastrian New Year's Day consecrated food was set out to feed the spirits of one's ancestors, and the spirits of the pious were believed to return for a while—invisible to the living—to be among their families. Still today, in both Indian Zoroastrian communities (Parsi and Irani), houses are meticulously cleaned and made ready for the annual coming of spirits, and a lamp is lit to welcome them, and kept alight for the duration of the festival. Frawardigan is colored by a sense of happiness and family piety, and is hardly touched by any dread of the other world. Frawardigan is also seen as a period of reflection: an opportunity to examine one's conscience and repent for past wrongs. In the present day, Zoroastrians congregate in the fire temples to offer prayers on behalf of their ancestors. After the worship, families will offer fruit, flowers, incense, wood, and money in individual rituals conducted by a priest around a small temple fire.

== See also ==
- All Saints' Day
- Pitri Paksha
