= Farvardinegan =

Monthly Zoroastrian ceremony

Farvardinegan (or Farvardog) is a yearly Zoroastrian ceremony. This ceremony takes place on Farvardin 19th (Farvardin is the first month of the Solar Hijri calendar). Farvardinegan is a ceremony to remember the deceased; it is celebrated as a feast, and the spirits of the deceased are called to unite in their joy.

Farvardinegan should not be confused with the other 10 Zoroastrian days of remembrance known as Frawardigan.

== History ==
In ancient Iran, ceremonies were part of religion. Some of these ceremonies were obligatory, such as Gahambars, the anniversary of creation, producing sky, water, earth, plants, useful beasts, and humans. Others are recommended, such as the ceremonies of equality of the name of the day and month that are held monthly. In the Zoroastrian calendar, every day of the month is named after one of the Amesha Spentas and Yazatas. Each month, the day whose name is the same as the month, is a ceremonial occasion. The most important are Farvardinegan (Farvardin, 19th), Tirgan (Tir, 13th), Mehrgan (Mehr, 16th) and Esfandgan (Esfand, 5th).

== Faravahar ==
Faravahar (Frawahar in Pahlavi, Fravashi in Avestan language, and Fravrti in Ancient Persian) is one of the internal forces that according to Mazdayasnan beliefs (Zoroastrianism), existed before the creation of the creatures, and will go to the upper world and persist there after their extinction. This spiritual force, which may also be called the essence of life, is imperishable.

== Farvardegan/Hamsapathmidee-e ==
Abū Rayḥān al-Bīrūnī refers to the Farvardinegan ceremony and ten-day Hamsapathmidee-e ceremony as “Farvardegan”. It takes place from the 26th of Esfand (called “Eshtad rooz”) to the 30th of Esfand (called “Aniran rooz”) and the five days of Gata or the stolen five (the first five days of Farvardin). The Farvardegan or Hamsapathmidee-e, related to Faravashis, was begun by the last Gahanbar.

In ancient times, Farvardegan was the ceremony of the Faravahars and lasted 10 days and 10 nights. Later, the ceremony of Hamaspathmidee-e was held to honor creation.

Nowroozi ceremonies and the Farvardin month are closely related to the Faravahars because of the belief that during these days of the year the Faravahars descend to the earth and go to their previous homes. People clean their homes and light fires to guide them. They put scents in the fire, pray for the spirits and read Avesta to put relax them. The only permitted acts are to perform religious duties and good deeds to attract the Faravashis to their residences. At the end of the ceremony, they bid then farewell.

== Farvardinegan ==
In the 19th day of Farvardin month, the ceremony of Farvardinegan is held to respect these eternal beings and the souls of the deceased. It is held with formalities among some of the Iranian Zoroastrians, especially in Yazd. In this ceremony that is called Farvardog nowadays, celebrants visit the graves of their deceased (in Tehran, and Firouzeh castle, the Zoroastrian graveyard. They burn agarwood and olibanum for the peace of the souls and put plants, fruits, candles and laraks on the graves. Larak is a combination of seven dried fruits.

In Farvardog ceremony, seven Mobads enter and sit. People cover the laraks in a wrapper and place them in front of mobads. “Mobadyars” (mobad assistants) are also there. Mobads begin reading Avesta and sing a song from Farvardin Yesht (a part of Avesta) to bless the laraks. Then mobadyars pass the laraks to people. This ceremony is a collective prayer for the peace of the souls. In Yazd, this ceremony begins at 4 p.m. on the 19th of Farvardin. In Tehran, the ceremony is not observed at a set time; instead, they visit the graves at whatever time is convenient.

== See also ==
- All Saints' Day
