= Karkuh =

Karkuh (Persian: كاركوه or كركوه) or Karku, commonly refers to:

- Karkuh, Mazandaran (كاركوه - Kārkūh) - village in Iran
- Karkuh, Sistan and Baluchestan (كركوه - Karkūh) - another village, in a different province of Iran

Karkuh may also refer to:

- Karkuh or Karku (tribe), one of the Scheduled Tribes of India, within the state of Madhya Pradesh

== See also ==
- Karkú, Chilean television series
