= Fire in ancient Iranian culture =

Fire is one of the elements that was praised and venerated by the ancient Iranians. Fire is in the Avesta as Atash or Atar, in Pahlavi literature atour or atakhsh; or in Persian literature, fire is known as azar or athash. The guardian angel of fire is known as Atouryast in Pahlavi literature, and in Persian literature Azarizad (Azar + Izad, which means Fire + Goddess). Due to the importance of the position, the Angel has been called the son of Ahura Mazda refer the Khordeh Avesta- Atash Niyash, litany to fire where Atash is called the son of Ahura Mazda. In ancient Iranian ritual, in order to appease the fire angel, fragrant woods or sandalwood were constantly applied in fire temples and fires in homes, this is done to this day, in over 300 consecrated Fire Temples like Udvada Atash Behram by Parsis and Iranian Zoroastrians. In the religion of Zoroastrianism, fire is a sign of purity and truth, and Ardibehesht (in New Persian the second month of the Zoroastrian calendar) is its guardian. Ancient Iranian legends attribute the discovery of lighting a fire with two stones to King Hushang of Pishdadian dynasty. The tradition also survives in Sadeh celebration, which still makes it popular.

== Early history ==
Fire commemoration and worship has a long history among the Indo-Iranians, perhaps going back to the Proto-Indo-European religion. The Indo-Iranians believed that fire was the essence of life and existence. The tradition remains among Muslim Iranians in later periods to ignite candles or turn on the light on the graves of the dead, and yet this is a common event. However, amongst Parsis and Iranian Zoroastrians as explained above, consecrated Fire Temples where fire by complex consecration rituals see Atash Behram is installed and kept ever burning to this day.

== Report of Greek historians ==
Ancient Greek historians refer to the Persians' attention to the gods of the sun, moon, earth, water and fire. Strabo's Geographica, Book XV, Chapter 3:

But it is especially to fire and water that they offer sacrifice. To fire they offer sacrifice by adding dry wood without the bark and by placing fat on top of it; and then they pour oil upon it and light it below, not blowing with their breath, but fanning it; and those who blow the fire with their breath or put anything dead or filthy upon it are put to death.

Another historian, Vesta Sarkhosh Curtis, writes that Iranians are sworn in front of the sacred fire, and such oaths are very important.

== See also ==
- Agni: Indo-Aryan god of fire
- Ancient Persia
- Fire Celebrations
- Homa (ritual)
