= Rapithwin =

Zoroastrian god of summer

Rapithwin Avestan: 𐬭𐬀𐬞𐬌𐬚𐬡𐬌𐬥𐬀
- God of summer, protector against winter
- The midday sun
- Other names: Rapihwin
- Affiliation: The Thirty-Three Deities, Guardians of the Days of the Month
- Symbol: The midday sun
- Gender: Male
- Festivals: Nowruz, Jashn-e Rapithwin
- Associated deities: Mithra, Ardawahisht

Rapithwin (Avestan: rapiθwina-, Middle Persian: rapihwin) is a yazata and god of noonday heat and the summer months in Zoroastrianism. He personifies the blazing heat of summer noon and is a helper and associate of Ardawahisht, lord of fire. During winter, he retreats beneath the earth and keeps springs, underground waters and the roots of plants and trees warm, protecting them from frost and ice. In Zoroastrian belief, the sun stood still at Rapithwin's station before the entry of evil, and Ohrmazd performed the sacrifice that produced creation during his hour. The resurrection of the dead will likewise be completed at noon at the end of world history. Rapithwin's return each spring foreshadows the final triumph of good and the restoration of the ideal world. At the appearance of the first Saoshyant, the sun will again stand still for ten days at Rapithwin's position.

== Name and etymology ==
The word for noon had an ordinary meaning in origin, although its literal sense had probably been forgotten by Zoroaster's time. Younger Avestan rapiθwā- means “noon”, and arə̄mpiθwā- is interpreted etymologically as the time for meat or food. The related Younger Avestan adjective rapiθwina- means “of noon”.

== Nature, origins and development ==
Rapithwin is the Zoroastrian yazata who personifies the blazing heat of summer noon and governs the summer months, standing in necessary, beneficial contrast to Tishtar. He is counted among the major yazatas, alongside Vayu, Anahita, Haoma, Azar, Bahram and Mithra, but despite his status, and unlike other major yazatas, no unique Yasht is dedicated to Rapithwin.

The origin of the deity may be tied to the three moments of the day that were of possible religious significance to the Indo-Iranian peoples. In Yasna 44.5, Zoroaster asks, “Who (is he) by whom (were made) dawn, noon and night, which (are) reminders to the discerning of duty?” Pre-Zoroastrian Iranians likely treated these moments as marking two periods of the day, called asnya-ratu- in Avestan and gāh in Middle Persian. The periods were Hāvani, the time of haoma pressing in the forenoon, and Uzayara, the time of the day's outgoing in the afternoon. Each was placed under one of the two lesser Ahuras, Mithra and Burz Yazad, respectively.

Zoroaster as a priest concerned with ritual observance introduced a third period, making noon a three-hour ratu rather than only the dividing point between morning and afternoon. In summer, the auspicious season when the holy powers are ascendant, this period was dedicated to Rapithwin, as the spirit of noon. Rapithwin is also lord of ideal time, since time stood still at noon when the world was created. This midday period was linked with hope for the end of finite time and the restoration of the ideal state of the world. And so Rapithwin was lord of the ideal time of the perfect primordial state, the completed resurrection and Frashokereti, the apocalypse in Zoroastrianism, with the Nowruz festival immediately dedicated to him.

Two groups of texts composed after the Sasanian calendar reform of the early sixth century CE gave Rapithwin increased prominence. This reform led to Nowruz being celebrated officially twice, as a religious and as a secular observance, with Rapithwin's rites belonging exclusively to the religious observance, and priests in certain contexts used those rites as another designation for Nowruz, apparently to distinguish the two celebrations.

== Mythology ==
Before evil entered the world, the sun stood still above it at Rapithwin's noonday station. Rapithwin was consequently lord of the ideal world. Ohrmazd performed the sacrifice that produced creation during Rapithwin's hour. At the end of world history, the resurrection of the dead will likewise be completed at noon.

The Zoroastrian summer lasts seven months, from Nowruz until the autumn festival of Ayathrima, when cattle were driven to their winter quarters. The remaining five months form the winter season, during which the Daevas predominate. Each year, amid the struggle between good and evil, the Daeva of winter attacks the world. Rapithwin then withdraws beneath the earth and warms subterranean waters, springs and the roots of plants and trees. By keeping those roots and waters warm, he prevents the demons of frost and ice from destroying the plants and trees entirely. The Spirit of winter therefore never wins a complete victory. During Rapithwin's absence, Mithra takes care of his part of the day, consequently named Second Hāvani rather than Rapithwā. The seasonal feast that coincides with Nowruz includes prayers for Rapithwin to return from his underground hiding place, where he has kept plant roots alive through the winter's attacks.

Rapithwin returns to earth each spring. His return is celebrated with joy and eschatological hope as a sign of the final, lasting triumph of the Good Creation, when evil will be defeated and God's rule on earth made manifest. It also foreshadows the triumph of good over which he will preside. In the Zadspram, the final resurrection of thee dead is visually compared with the blossoming of trees in the spring, likening resurrection itself to new leaves growing from dry plants and trees.

== Prayers and festivals ==
Relief of a lion attacking a bull in Persepolis, symbolizing the struggle between seasons

There are three daylight gāhs throughout the Zoroastrian year. During each, believers are required to say the kusti prayers and invoke the protective divinity of that watch. Ardawahisht is the protector invoked for Rapithwina's gāh. Throughout the long summer, the noon observance directs worshippers' thoughts to asha and the work of Frashokereti. Thus Rapithwin's withdrawal during winter serves as a yearly reminder of the menacing power of evil.

Rapithwin is not invoked in the noon prayers during winter in acknowledgment of his retreat. At noon on Nowruz he returns and is welcomed with a service of blessing and thanksgiving. The recorded rites include a yasna, the principal Zoroastrian liturgy, dedicated to him. They also include an Āfrīnagān-i Rapiθwin. Rapithwin's feast is part of Nowruz, the new day of both the actual year and the future ideal time. In the Nowruz thanksgiving ceremony, the zaotar (zot) faces west, whereas in other communal jašn ceremonies the priest faces east. M. Boyce suggests that the eastward orientation honors the rising sun, representing light beginning to fight darkness and evil. Rapithwin's west-facing ceremony instead celebrates the time of triumphant light, when goodness is fulfilled and at rest.

In Middle Persian and Zoroastrian Persian lists of observances required of every believer, Rapithwin always appears among the holy days under various late spellings. In all the patēt, or confessional formularies, failure to observe Rapithwin is acknowledged as a sin. Nowruz itself appears, incongruously, to be absent from both kinds of text, interpreted as a substitution of Rapithwin's name for Nowruz, possible because Rapithwin's symbolism was powerful in itself and closely linked to the festival. The struggle between seasons may also be represented in reliefs at Persepolis showing a lion attacking a bull. In this proposed interpretation, the lion represents the sun and the bull the rains, while the reliefs suggest an annual Persian festival concerned with the struggle of the seasons and the forces of life.
