= Sadeh =

Ancient Iranian tradition

Sadeh جشن سده
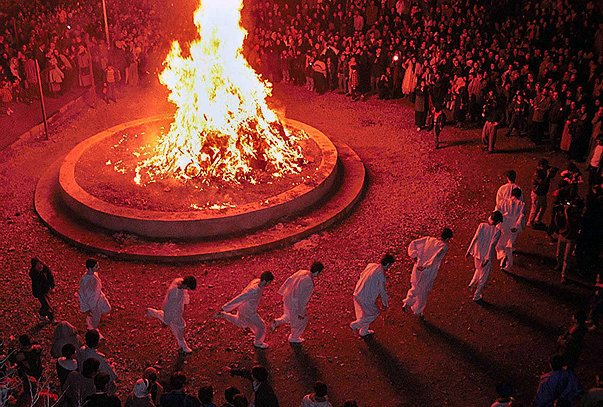
- Sadeh in Iran
- Also called: Jashn-e Sadeh (Persian: جشن سده)
- Observed by: Iran; Tajikistan; Canada (by Iranian Canadians); United States (by Iranian Americans)
- Date: 10 Bahman (January 29, 30, or 31)
- Frequency: annual
- Related to: Nowruz, Tirgan, Mehregan, Yalda

Sadeh/Sada celebration
- UNESCO Intangible Cultural Heritage
- Country: Iran and Tajikistan
- Reference: 01713
- Region: Asia and the Pacific

Inscription history
- Inscription: 2023 (18th session)
- List: Representative

Sadeh (Persian: سده also transliterated as Sade), is an Iranian festival that dates back to the Achaemenid Empire. Sadeh is celebrated 50 days before Nowruz. Sadeh in Persian means "hundred" and refers to the one hundred days and nights remaining to the beginning of spring. Sadeh is a mid-winter festival that was celebrated with grandeur and magnificence in ancient Persia. It was a festivity to honor fire and to defeat the forces of darkness, frost, and cold.

== History ==
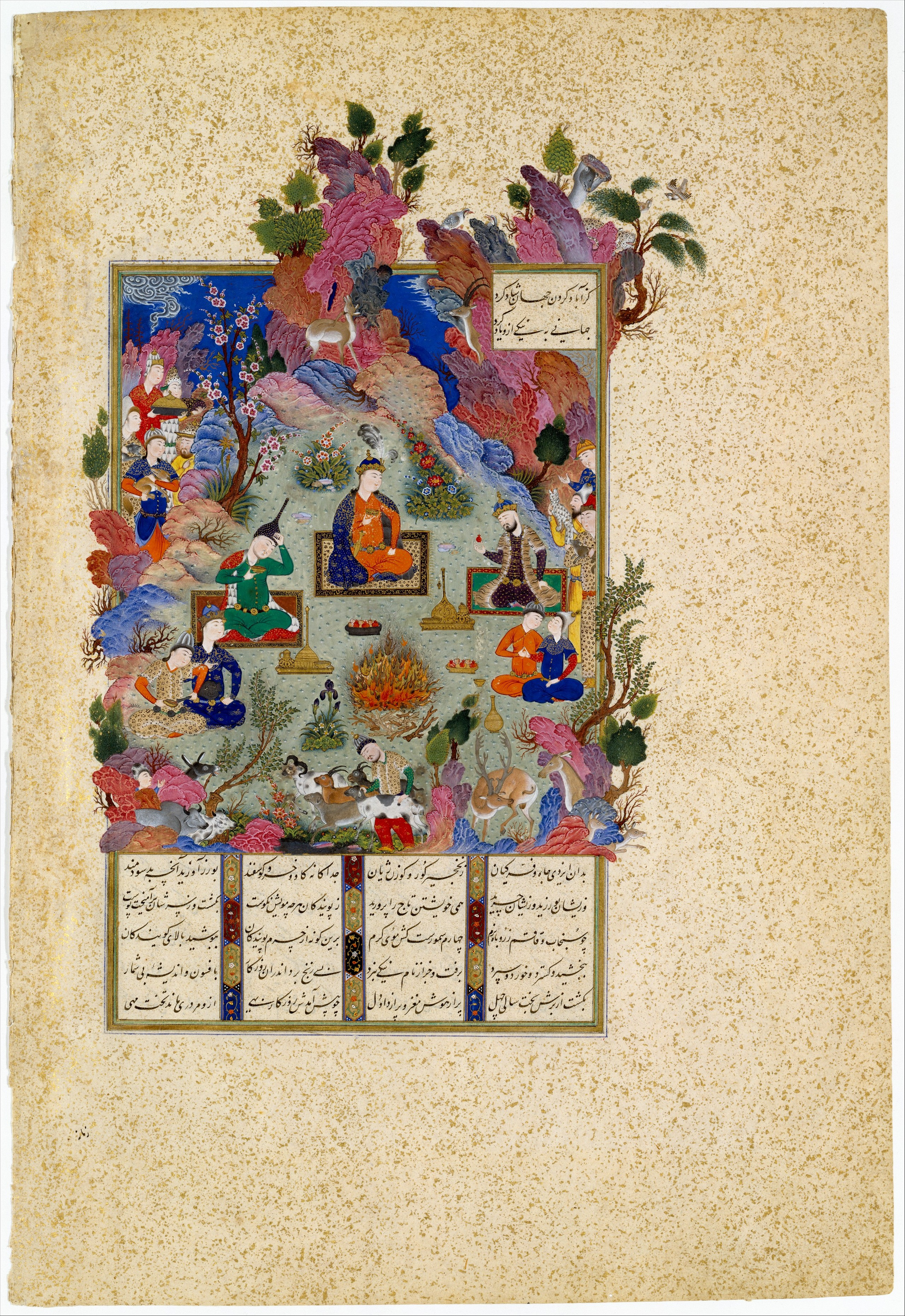
Persian miniature of "The Feast of Sada" from Shahname of Shah Tahmasp

Legends have it that King Hushang, the 2nd king of the mythological Pishdadian dynasty (Pishdad means to give the Law), established the Sadeh tradition. It is said that Hushang was once climbing a mountain when he saw a snake. When he threw a stone to hit the snake, it hit another stone and since they were both flint stones, fire broke out and the snake escaped. This way he discovered how to light a fire. Hushang cheered up and praised God who revealed to him the secret of lighting a fire. Then he announced: "This is a light from God. So we must admire it."

According to religious beliefs, Jashn-e Sadeh recalls the importance of light, fire and energy; light which comes from God is found in the hearts of his creatures.

During ancient times, Jashn-e Sadeh was celebrated by lighting fire. For Zoroastrians the chief preparation for Sadeh was and still in some parts is the gathering of wood the day before the festival. Teenage boys accompanied by a few adult males would go to local mountains to gather camel thorns, a common desert shrub in Iran. For most, this is the first time they are away from their families. The occasion resembles a ritual of passage to adulthood, a notable step for the boys enroute to manhood. The boys would take the camel thorns to the temples in their cities. If it was their first time doing this, on their return, a celebration was held at home with the presence of friends and families.

During ancient times, the fires were always set near water and the temples (see also: Fire temple). The fire originally meant to assist the revival of sun and bring back the warmth and light of summer. It was also meant to drive off the demons of frost and cold, which turned water to ice, and thus could kill the roots of plants.

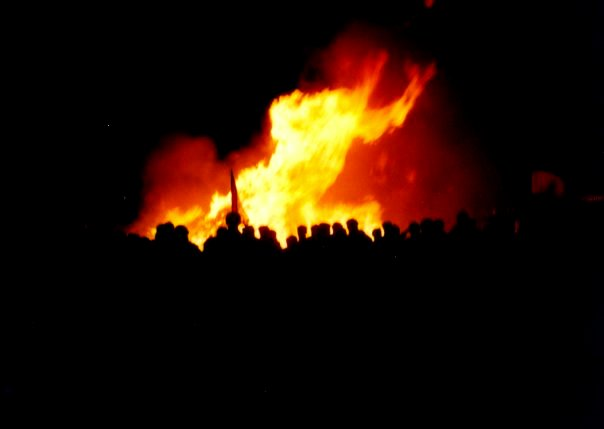
Sadeh in Varjavand Kushk, 2003

The fire was kept burning all night. The day after, women would go to the fire in the morning, each taking a small portion of the fire back to their homes to make new glowing fire from the "blessed fire" of the temple. This is to spread the blessing of the Sadeh fire to every household in the neighborhood. Whatever is left from the fire would be taken back to the shrine to be placed in one container and kept at the temple until the next year. This way the fire is kept burning all year round. The "eternal fire" also symbolizes the love of homeland which is always alive like a fervent fire in the people's hearts.

The festivities would normally continue for three days. The evenings are spent eating and giving out foods as donations, food that is prepared from slaughtered lambs and is distributed among the poor.

The most elaborate report of the celebration of Sadeh after the Muslim conquest of Persia in 7th century AD comes from the 10th century AD during the reign of Mardavij of Ziyarid dynasty, the ruler of Isfahan. The Ziyarid dynasty did their best to maintain Persian traditions. Bonfires were set up on both sides of the Zayandeh River to remember the Sadeh custom. The fires were kept in specially built metal holders. Hundreds of birds were released while the fireworks were lighting the sky. There were fireworks, dancing and music with lavish feasts of roasted lamb, beef, chicken and other delicacies.

Today the ceremony is celebrated somewhat like the ancient times in some Iranian cities such as Kerman and Yazd. Jashn e Sadeh is also celebrated every year in the Kushke Varjavand gardens in Karaj with the presence of Iranian Zoroastrians and others interested in traditional Persian ceremonies. Sometimes the fires are not lit outside and all activities take place inside the Zoroastrian temples. The activities of camel thorn gathering have almost been stopped though there are efforts to preserve the tradition. However, the bulk of Iranians are becoming more familiar with the occasion and there are gatherings and celebrations even outside the country on 30 January each year. People will gather and pray, and then they will hold each other's hands, form a circle, and dance around the fire.

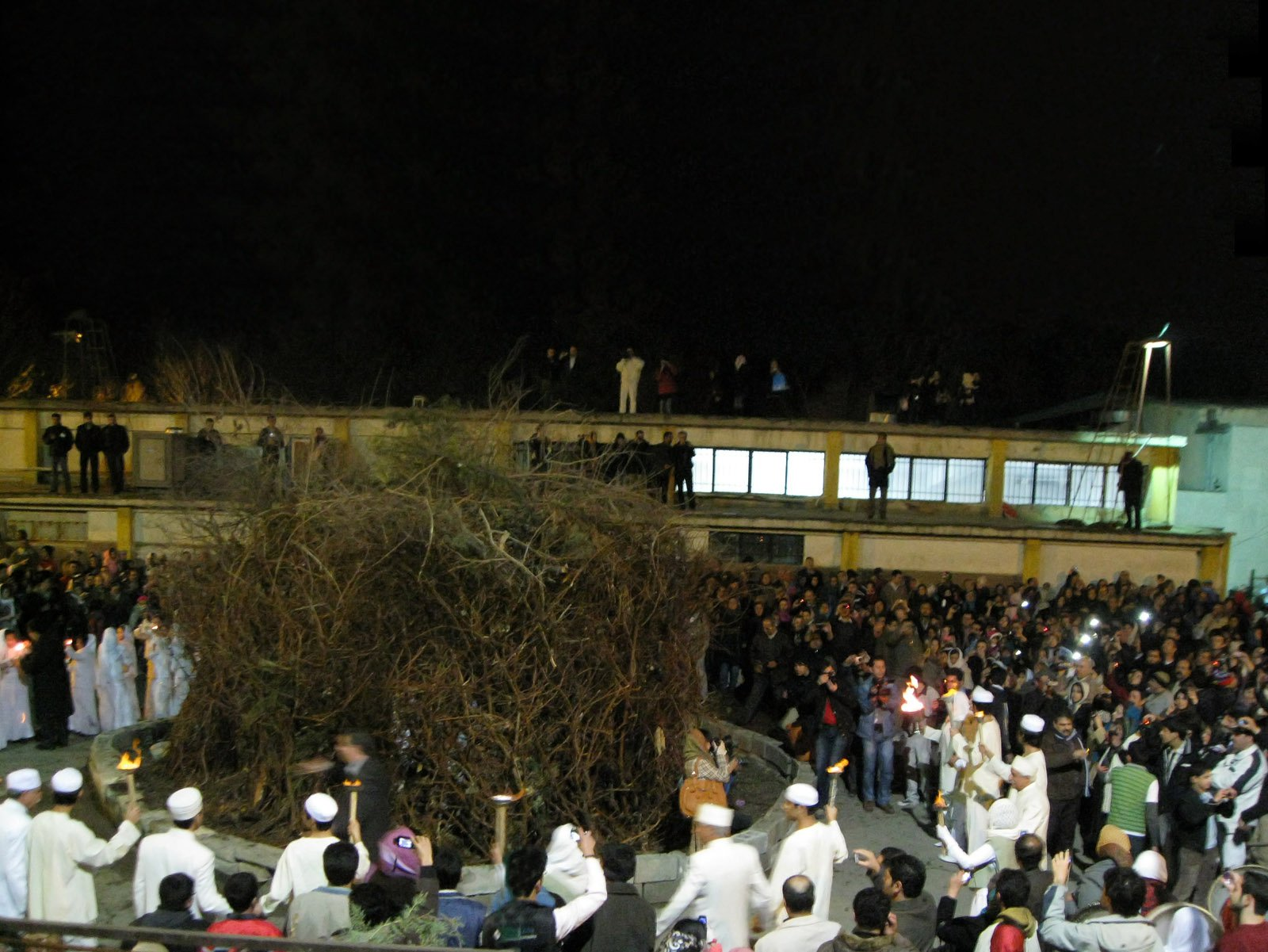
Sadeh in Tehranpars Markar, 2011

Every year, on 30 January, thousands of Zoroastrians in Iran and other countries celebrate the religious feast of Jashn-e Sadeh by burning firewood in an open space to signify the coming of spring and as a symbolic token of the eternal fight with mischief.

There is a cave in a mountain near Yazd, called Chak-Chak Fire Temple. Every year special ceremonies are held there during the Sadeh Feast. It is believed that the last Zoroastrian princess took shelter there in 640 AD when the Muslims expanded their power to the east.

Although for the majority of Iranians Sadeh has no religious significance and no specific rituals are involved other than lighting fires at sunset and having a cheerful time, Iranians of all faiths make a collective effort at this day to keep up with their ancient traditions and to celebrate the preciousness of creation.

Sadeh has a complex history and two different days were observed for the festival's veneration. In addition to 50 days (100 days and nights) before the beginning of the new year (or hundredth day after the gahambar of Ayathrima), already noted, the other celebration marked the hundred day before the religious new year (religious new year is not necessarily the same as spring new year). It is not clear why there are two Sadeh Festivals and why different regions have had different dates. Many of Zoroastrian holy days were and are celebrated twice; this is most likely caused by the calendar reform in the 3rd century AD.

Since 2017 Sadeh is officially recognized and celebrated by the Government of Tajikistan.

On January 30, 2023, people in multiple different cities of Iran, celebrated Sadeh. In the wake of the Mahsa Amini protests, Sadeh was celebrated by a great number of people, and they prepared fire as a symbol of Sadeh feast all across the Iran. Among the cities that celebrated Sadeh, were Tehran, Tabriz, Izeh, Ahvaz, Shiraz, Kerman, Sanandaj, Isfahan, Zanjan, Kermanshah, Yazd, Malayer, Mashhad, and some cities of Hormozgan. In Tehran, the districts of Amanieh, Shahr-Ara, Andisheh, Shahriyar, Haft-howz, Ekbatan, Beheshti, and Sohrevardi were some of the neighborhoods in which Sadeh was celebrated by preparing fire. Some people also gathered in mountains of northern Tehran, and made fire to celebrate Sadeh.

== See also ==
- Culture of Iran
- Fire in ancient Iranian culture
- Iranian festivals
- Iranian culture
- Zoroastrian calendar
