= Khordad Sal =

Zoroastrian observance of Zoroaster's birthday

- Official name: خرداد سال (Khordad Sal)
- Observed by: Zoroastrians worldwide
- Type: Zoroastrian
- Significance: Birth anniversary of Zarathushtra, prophet of Zoroastrianism
- Date: 6th day of Farvardin in the Zoroastrian calendar
- Frequency: Annual
- Related to: Nowruz, Gahambar

Khordad Sal (Persian: خرداد روز; /ˈkɔːrdɑːdsɑːl/) is the birth anniversary (or birthdate) of Zarathushtra that is celebrated by Zoroastrians all over the world. It is celebrated annually on 26 March (5th day after Nowruz), in which scholars reference "Khordad day of Farvardin" in Zoroastrian calendars as this period. Parties and ghambars are held on this period of celebration. Special prayers and jashan are also held throughout the entire day. On Khordad Sal, Parsi households are thoroughly cleaned and adorned with festive decorations, and elaborate traditional meals are prepared to mark the joyous occasion. A grand feast is prepared to mark the occasion.

The Zoroastrian narrative holds that Zarathushtra (Zoroaster), as the divinely inspired prophet of Ahura Mazda, brought the revelation of asha (truth, order) to humanity, inaugurating an ethical and spiritual renewal. The birth of Zarathushtra, commemorated here as Khordad Sal, is honored accordingly not merely as a marker of a crucial historical event in the foundation of Zoroastrianism, but as the manifestation of divine wisdom in human form, fulfilling cosmic purpose and advancing the ongoing struggle of good against evil. Zoroastrians believe that Zarathushtra’s teachings continue to guide adherents toward righteousness (asha vahishta), and celebrating his birth reaffirms devotion to these ideals through prayer, reflection, and communal acts of piety. The celebrations of Khordad Sal is, by principle, not only a festive occasion but a sacred opportunity to renew moral commitments and align personal life with the divine order.

== Etymology ==
The term Khordad Sal is derived from the Persian calendar, where Khordad refers to the sixth day of the month of Farvardin, and Sal means "year" or "birthday" in this context. The word Khordad itself is rooted in the Avestan term Haurvatat (𐬵𐬀𐬎𐬭𐬬𐬀𐬙𐬀𐬙), one of the Amesha Spentas (divine entities) symbolizing wholeness, perfection, and well-being. Thus, Khordad Sal literally signifies "the auspicious day of perfection" that marks the birth of the prophet Zarathushtra. The phrase in itself embodies both a calendrical designation and a spiritual aspiration for renewal and completeness within the Zoroastrian faith.

== Birth Narratives of Zoroaster ==
According to early Zoroastrian and Middle Persian traditions, Zarathushtra’s birth was marked by extraordinary omens that signified his divine mission. It is said that his mother, Dughdova, dreamed of a great light entering her, heralding the prophet’s destiny as a bringer of truth. Upon birth, Zarathushtra is recorded to have laughed instead of cried, a sign of his divine nature and fearless disposition against evil. These narratives were later enriched by Armenian and Persian Rivayat traditions, which wove symbolic imagery of cosmic struggle into the prophet’s birth story, aligning his arrival with the moral regeneration of the world.

In particular, the Revāyat of Bahman Parsi describes the miraculous birth of Zarathushtra as fulfilling divine prophecy, with heavenly beings rejoicing at his arrival. These legends frequently emphasize the fear his birth inspired in daevas (evil spirits), who foresaw the destruction of their dominion. In some Armenian versions, local rulers interpreted the prophet’s birth as an ominous sign threatening the existing cosmic order.

== History ==
The celebration of Khordad Sal appears to have ancient roots, with the original Zoroastrian liturgical calendar preserving the prophet’s birthday on the sixth day of Farvardin. While early Iranian Zoroastrians observed the day primarily with ritual prayers, fire offerings, and communal meals, the festival evolved among Parsis in India into a vibrant social and religious event. By the 19th and 20th centuries, Khordad Sal was celebrated with large public gatherings, durbars, and social feasts, helping to consolidate Parsi identity in the colonial and postcolonial periods. In contemporary times, the celebration remains an important marker of communal cohesion among global Zoroastrian diasporas, blending devotional acts with social functions.

== See also ==
- Twin Holy Birthdays
