= Karkuyeh Fire Temple =

Iranian national heritage site

Karkuyeh Fire Temple آتشکده کرکویه
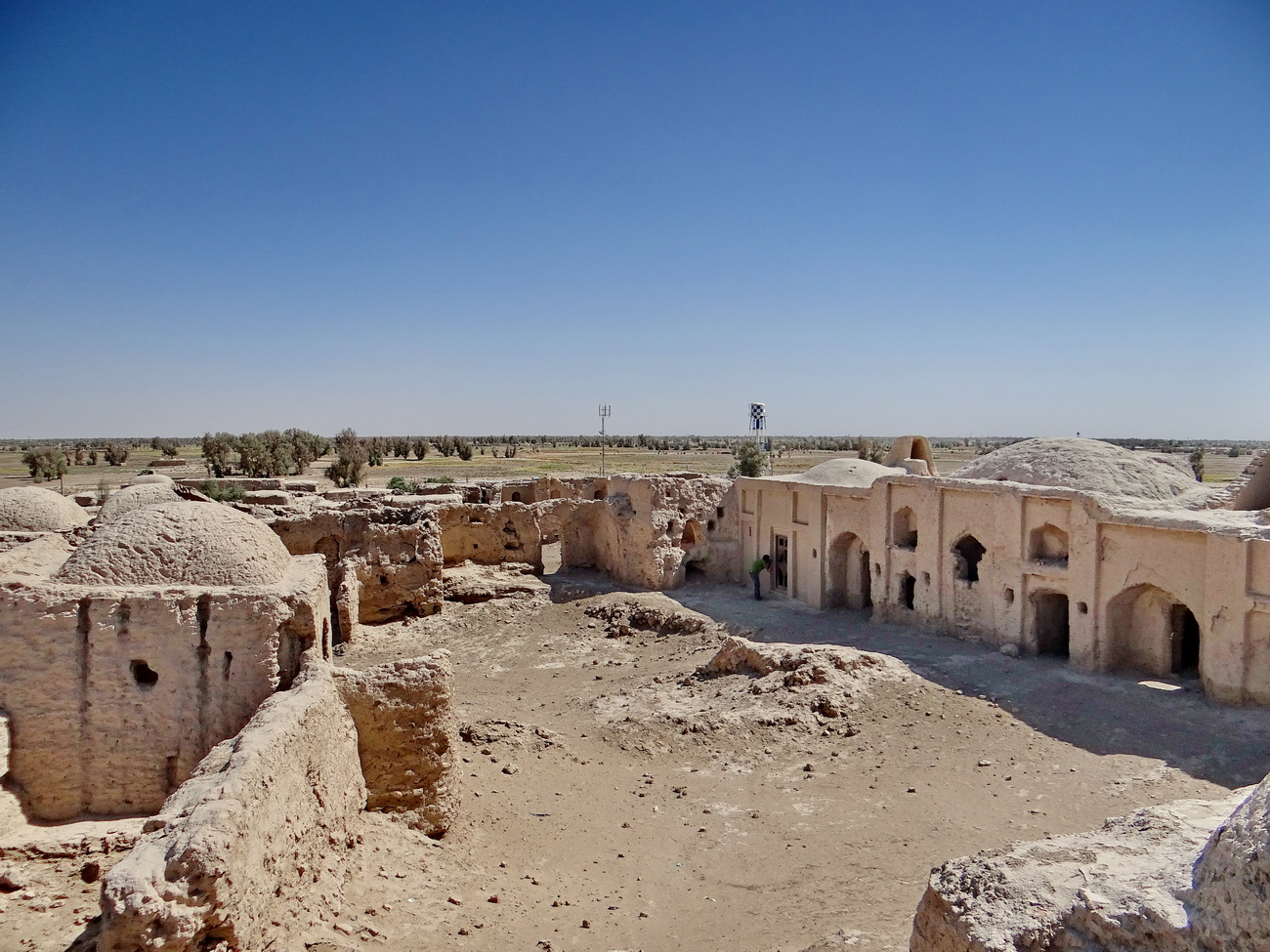

- Location within Iran
- 31°09′34.1″N 61°45′09″E
- Location: Karkuh, Sistan and Baluchestan Province, Iran

Iran National Heritage List
- Official name: Karkuyeh Fire Temple
- Type: Fire Temple
- Designated: 1932
- Reference no.: 119
- Conservation organization: Cultural Heritage, Handicrafts and Tourism Organization of Iran

The Karkuyeh Fire Temple or Karkouy Fire Temple (Persian: آتشکده کرکویه) is a historic Fire Temple constructed during the Sasanian era located in historic region of Seistan, currently in Hirmand County, Sistan and Baluchestan province. This fire temple which was among Iran's major fire temples until the AH 7th/AD 13th century. According to History of Seistan, there is a poem related to this place, called Soroud-e Karkouy (fa) which is one of the oldest extant pieces of poetry in modern Persian language. It was finally destroyed and abandoned during Mongol invasions.
