= Atar =

Zoroastrian god and personification of holy fire

Azar Avestan: 𐬁𐬙𐬀𐬭
- God of holy fire, Son of Ohrmazd
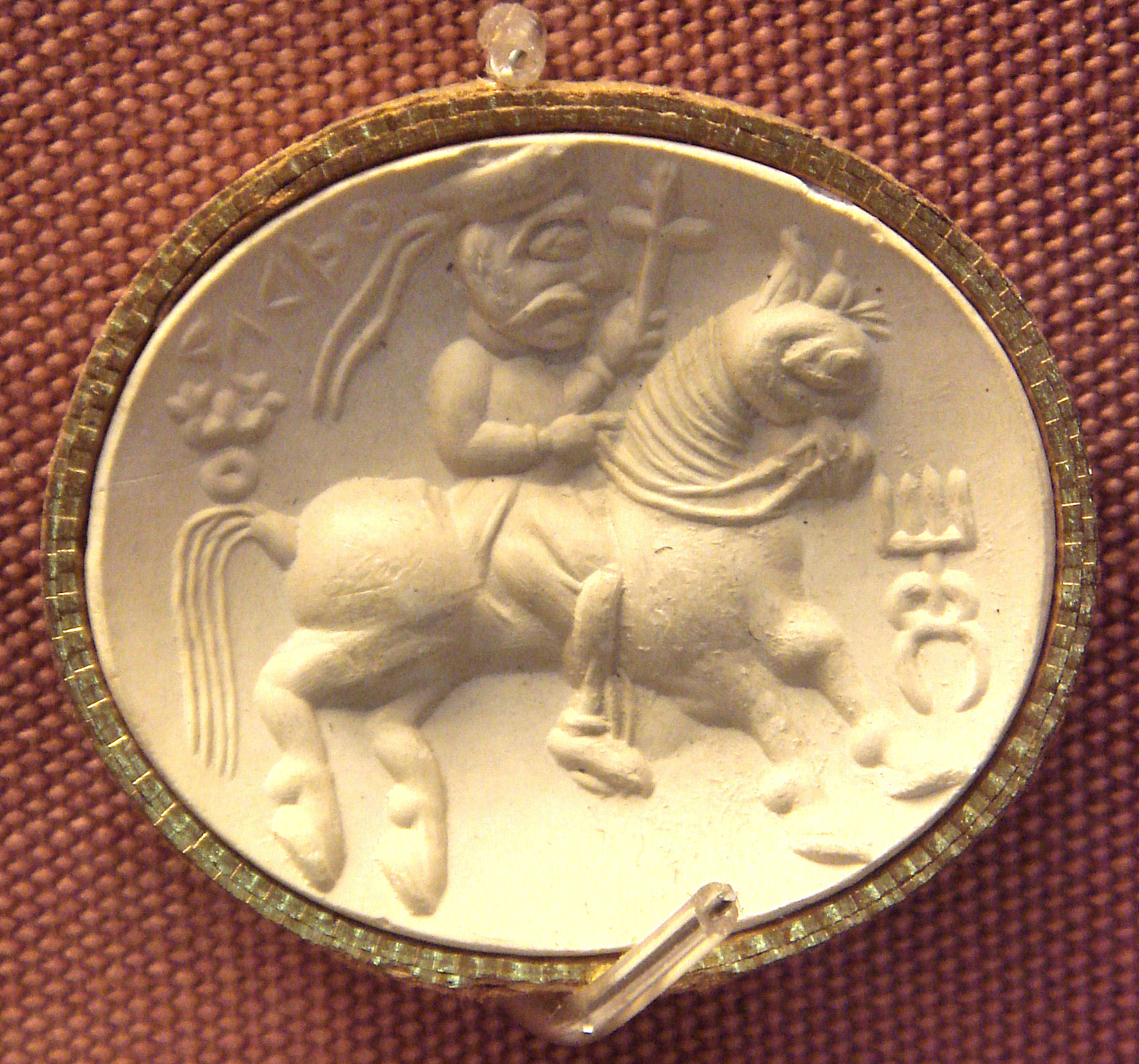
- Azar on a Sassanid carnelian seal
- Other names: Atash, Ataxsh, Adhur, Adar, Athsho, Adsho
- Affiliation: The Thirty-Three Deities, Guardians of the Days of the Month
- Symbol: Fire, fire altar
- Sacred flower: Marigold
- Attributes: Purification, protection, divine judgment, righteousness, illumination, vitality
- Day: 9th day of every month in the Zoroastrian calendar
- Texts: Yasna, Zamyad Yasht, Atash Niyayesh, Bundahishn
- Gender: Male
- Festivals: Azargan
- Associated deities: Ohrmazd, Khwarrah, Ardawahisht, Mithra

Equivalents
- Greek: Hephaestus
- Hindu: Agni
- Roman: Vulcan

Atar (Avestan: 𐬁𐬙𐬀𐬭, ātar), also known as Azar (Persian: آذر), is a yazata in ancient Iranian religion and the Zoroastrian god of fire. The holy fire may be conceived as visible or invisible, burning or unburning, and the god is addressed in Zoroastrian prayer as the son of Ohrmazd. Azar protects the creation of asha, the principle of truth and right order, and appears as a divine actor in the Zamyad Yašt, where he confronts the dragon Azhi Dahaka over an elusive divine Glory.

Reverence for fire developed from an ancient Indo-Iranian hearth tradition. In Zoroastrian accounts, fire also carries divine illumination, tests people's truthfulness, and becomes the agent of the final ordeal in molten metal. Fire permeates the creations and is classified into five types in later priestly teaching.

Household flames were traditionally maintained throughout their owners' lives, while permanent sacred fires developed into a temple cult, apparently in the later Achaemenid period. Great fires came to be associated with particular Iranian regions and royal houses. In Bactria, the anthropomorphic god Aθšo appeared on Kushan coins with flames around his body, while representations of a human figure emerging from a fire altar in Sasanian art remain open to interpretation.

== Etymology ==
The Avestan word ātar refers to sources of heat and light. Its nominative singular form, ātarš, gave rise to ātaš, meaning fire, in both Book Pahlavi and New Persian. Book Pahlavi also has ātaxš, while Middle Persian and Parthian use ādur, from which New Persian āḏar (azar) developed. The name of the masculine divinity Azar has been traced, tentatively, to an older neuter noun, ătar-, meaning fire.

The origin of ātar- has long been uncertain. Its proposed connection with Avestan āθrauuan or aθaurun, terms for a priest corresponding to Vedic atharvan, is now considered unlikely. The Iranian word also poses a problem because it differs from the familiar Indo-European fire word represented by Sanskrit agni- and Latin igni-. One explanation held that Zoroaster deliberately replaced the older expression to free the concept from its inherited associations. That proposal has been questioned because he otherwise retained familiar words and ideas while expressing new teachings, and because it does not account for the origin of ātar- itself. A proposed Indo-European origin is *hxehxtr-, meaning fire. Under this derivation, ātar would be related to Latin ater, meaning black, and Albanian vatër (definite vatra), meaning hearth or fireplace. The Albanian word was borrowed into Romanian as vatră, with later forms including Serbo-Croatian vatra, meaning fire, and Ukrainian vatra, meaning bonfire. This proposed derivation stands alongside the older assessment that the origin of the word was unknown.

== Origins and development ==
Zoroastrian reverence for fire grew out of an Indo-Iranian hearth-fire cult that probably reaches back to Indo-European times. Fire brought warmth, light, and comfort into the household. Ancient Iranians treated the hearth flame as the visible form of Azar, who lived among people as both servant and master. They repaid his continual help with regular offerings, known as ātaš-zōhr. Fire also appeared in religious ceremonies. The Yasna Haptaŋhāiti may preserve a pre-Zoroastrian liturgy in which priests offered to fire and water. Azar and the Vedic Agni appear to have begun as personifications of the perpetually burning hearth flame. Their place was among human dwellings (nmãnāhu mašyākanąm), rather than in a heavenly residence. Oldenberg described Agni as fire initially endowed with a divine soul and only later conceived as a divine being distinguishable from the element itself. The same account of development has been applied to Azar due to their association within as the continuation of an Indo-Iranian fire-god.

Azar is both a personified divine being and the Zoroastrian conception of holy fire. In the Avesta, fire is honored as a “most holy spirit” and liturgically addressed as the son of Ohrmazd. In the Younger Avesta, Azar draws strength from asha, the principle of truth and right order, and protects its creation. Nevertheless, apart from the repeated title of Ohrmazd's son, his personification is relatively restrained. He has none of the extensive collection of epithets applied to Agni. One proposed explanation contrasts the restraint of myth-making under Zoroaster's ethical teachings with the rich elaboration of Agni in the Indian sacrificial tradition, where fire held a central ritual place.

In the oldest texts, fire is generally presented in relation to Ohrmazd. In Yasna 34.4, the fire belonging to Ohrmazd is described as a powerful aid to his supporters and as bringing visible harm, by means of its hands, to opponents. By the late Achaemenid period, Azar, understood as the essence of the yazata of that name, had entered the Zoroastrian order of divine beings. He assists Ardwahisht, the Amehraspands responsible for the heavenly lights. The marigold (Calendula) is his assigned flower in Bundahishn 27.24. In Bactria, the fire deity appears as αθþο, Aθšo, a religious continuation of the Zoroastrian god whose name continues the form ātarš. Later Zoroastrian usage also brings the divine Azar into close iconographic identification with the element itself. The Middle Persian spelling of the divinity's name is 𐭠𐭲𐭥𐭥𐭩, ādar or ādur, while fire itself is written 𐭠𐭲𐭧𐭱, ātaxsh. Fire became one of the principal symbols of the religion.

== Cosmology ==
The fire on earth was understood as the sun's representative. The sun's rising and setting followed ṛta or asha, the order governing the world, and fire shared this connection. Fire also appeared in the ancient Iranian and Indian practice of swearing covenants in Mithra's presence. Mithra embodied the binding power of the covenant, while the hearth flame, which sustained human life, or the sun, which marked time and the seasons, represented the established order. In the system of divine helpers, the fire yazata and Rapithwin serve Ardwahisht as hamkars.

Ancient Iranian accounts of the creation could give fire a place as a seventh creation and the life force within the other six. Fire was also said to be “distributed in all” of them while remaining a visible and perceptible element in its own right. The Bundahishn calls it the last creation, but other sources do not consistently count it separately. In particular, the ancient Farvardin Yašt repeatedly invokes the other creations without including fire. Its status as a distinct creation has therefore been interpreted as a later matter of classification. One reconstruction holds that fire entered the other six creations when they first came to life. In the preceding still and empty world, the sun remained fixed at noon above a flat, bare earth and unmoving waters, with the first plant, the primeval bull, and Kayumars existing quietly at the center.

Fire was thought to permeate the other creations while also remaining perceptible in its own right. The seed of animals and people came from it. Fire ran through the earth, warming the roots of plants and the sources of water during winter. It appeared in lightning and in the sun, which shared its heat and brightness. Its brilliance ultimately came from the Endless Light, the dwelling of Ohrmazd above the edge of the sky.

Perhaps in the Parthian period, the Magi developed a fivefold classification of fire. Yasna 17.11, a late part of the liturgy, names these forms in ascending rank. The first is bərəzi.savah, “of high benefit,” which the Pahlavi commentary places in the Atash Bahrams. The second, vohu fryāna, probably “loving the good,” is the fire or life force in people. The third, urvāzišta, “the most joyful,” resides in plants. The fourth, vazišta, “the swiftest” with some uncertainty in the translation, is lightning. The highest, spə̄ništa, “the holiest,” burns before Ohrmazd himself. The system is a scholarly classification. The final three names are ordinary Avestan adjectives, two already used as titles of fire in the Yasna Haptaŋhāiti. The association of urvāzišta with plants (urvara) was probably suggested by the similarity of the words' opening sounds, whereas bərəzi.savah and vohu.fryāna appear only in Yasna 17. The Zātspram gives the same identifications in chapter 3.77–82. The Bundahishn reverses the positions of two kinds of fire. It puts bərəzi.savah before Ohrmazd and identifies spə̄ništa with the Atash Bahrams and other fires on earth.

== Mythology ==
In the Zamyad Yašt (19.46–51), Azar joins the struggle for a khwarrah (divine glory) that cannot be taken by force. The Good Spirit, Bahman, Ardawahisht, and Azar, the son of Ohrmazd, throw their swift darts against the Evil Spirit and his allies. Opposing them are Aka Mana, Aeshma with his wounding spear, the dragon Azhi Dahaka, and Spityura, who had sawed Jamshid in two. Azar advances to claim the Glory, but the three-mouthed Azhi Dahaka, who follows the evil law, comes up behind him and threatens to extinguish him. The dragon warns that, if Azar takes the Glory, he will prevent him from ever blazing on Ohrmazd's earth or defending the world of the good principle. Frightened for his life, Azar withdraws his hands. Azhi Dahaka then moves to claim the Glory himself. Azar approaches from behind and threatens to enter the dragon's hindquarters and flare up inside his jaws, leaving him unable to roam the earth destroying the good creation. The dragon, now afraid for his own life, also pulls back. The Glory swells up and moves into the sea Vouru-Kasha, where the swift-horsed "Son of the Waters", Burz Yazad, immediately takes it. Burz Yazad seeks to secure the unattainable Glory at the bottom of the sea and the deepest rivers.

Fire also had a judicial role in ancient Iran. People accused of lying or breaking a covenant (miθra-) could be subjected to a solemn ordeal to establish their innocence. One ordeal required them to pass through flames, and another involved molten metal poured upon the bare chest. Tradition spoke of roughly thirty kinds of trial by fire. Death during the ordeal established the accused person's guilt. Survival proved innocence because Mithra and the other divine beings had protected the person. The mildest test was an oath accompanied by a drink containing sulfur, called Avestan saokant, Middle Persian sōgand, and New Persian sowgand. The sulfur was believed to burn the offender from within if the oath was false. Through such practices, fire became linked with truth and asha. Zoroaster developed this inherited role further by treating fire as the creation of Ardawahisht and the instrument of God's judgment at the Last Day. The final ordeal would cover the earth in a flood of molten metal, through which humanity would have to pass. This event belongs to the final renovation, Frashokereti. Fire's judicial meaning thus acquired a profound moral and spiritual role in Zoroaster's teaching. Its importance in ancient Iran also extended to ritual, everyday life, and theories of the world.

In the early religious texts, Azar is also the light through which Ohrmazd reveals his choice of Zoroaster. This light, called Zarathushtra Mainyu Athra, is mentioned in Yasna 31.3. Ohrmazd radiates it in 43.9. It conveys the assurance of Bahman in 43.4 and illuminates the inner self in 46.7. Azar gives forth the “other lights” in 31.7 as an essence of Ohrmazd from which understanding and wisdom spread through the universe. Zoroaster therefore directs worshippers to pray in the presence of fire, whether facing the sun or their own hearth, to fix their devotion upon asha and the righteousness they should seek, as in Yasna 43.9.

== Worship ==
For Zoroaster, reverence for fire carried moral and spiritual weight. In Yasna 43.9 he connects the offering made before fire with the utmost effort to think of asha. His followers were instructed always to pray in the presence of fire, whether before a flame on earth or facing the sun or moon in the heavens. The fire present on earth might be an ordinary household flame or a ritual fire. Traditionally, a man set up his own hearth when he established an independent household, and its flame was meant to remain alive throughout his lifetime. This domestic tradition amounted to the keeping of an ever-burning fire.

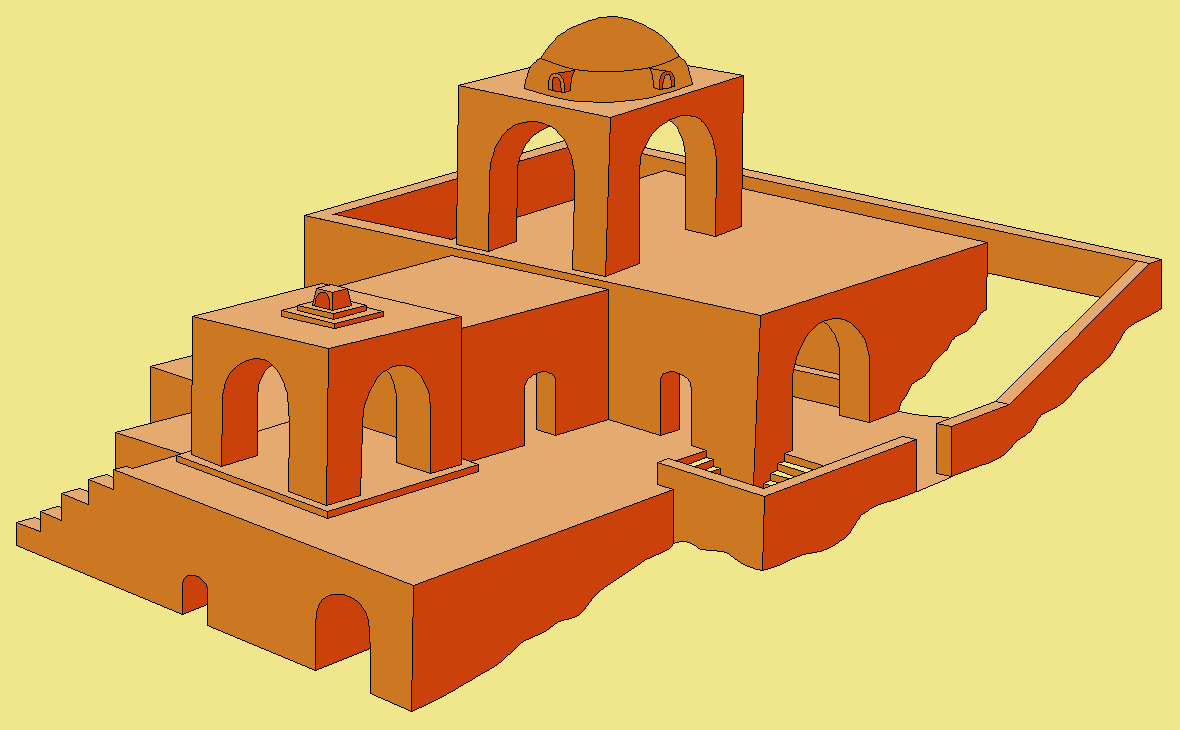
Structure of Harpak fire temple in Abyaneh

A separate temple cult seems to have emerged in the later Achaemenid period, later than Zoroastrianism itself and perhaps in response to the recently established shrine and image cult of Anahita. The cult of a permanent temple fire appears in the evidence around the fourth century BCE, approximately when Azar was introduced as a divinity in the hierarchy. The Avesta contains no reference to fire temples, and no Old Persian term for one is known. No actual fire-temple ruin has been identified securely from before the Parthian period. Boyce proposed that the new fire cult was instituted in opposition to the shrine and image cult.

The temple fire extended the household practice. It remained a wood fire, set upon an altar-like fire holder, the ātašdān, and formally “enthroned,” nišāst, a process also called taḵt-nešīnī. Priests made the traditional offerings five times daily and guarded its purity with particular care. No Achaemenid record describes the categories of temple fire or how they were first assembled. It has nevertheless been proposed that the cult was established with considerable splendor to compete with the image cult of Anahita and that the highest-ranked sacred fire was also the oldest form.

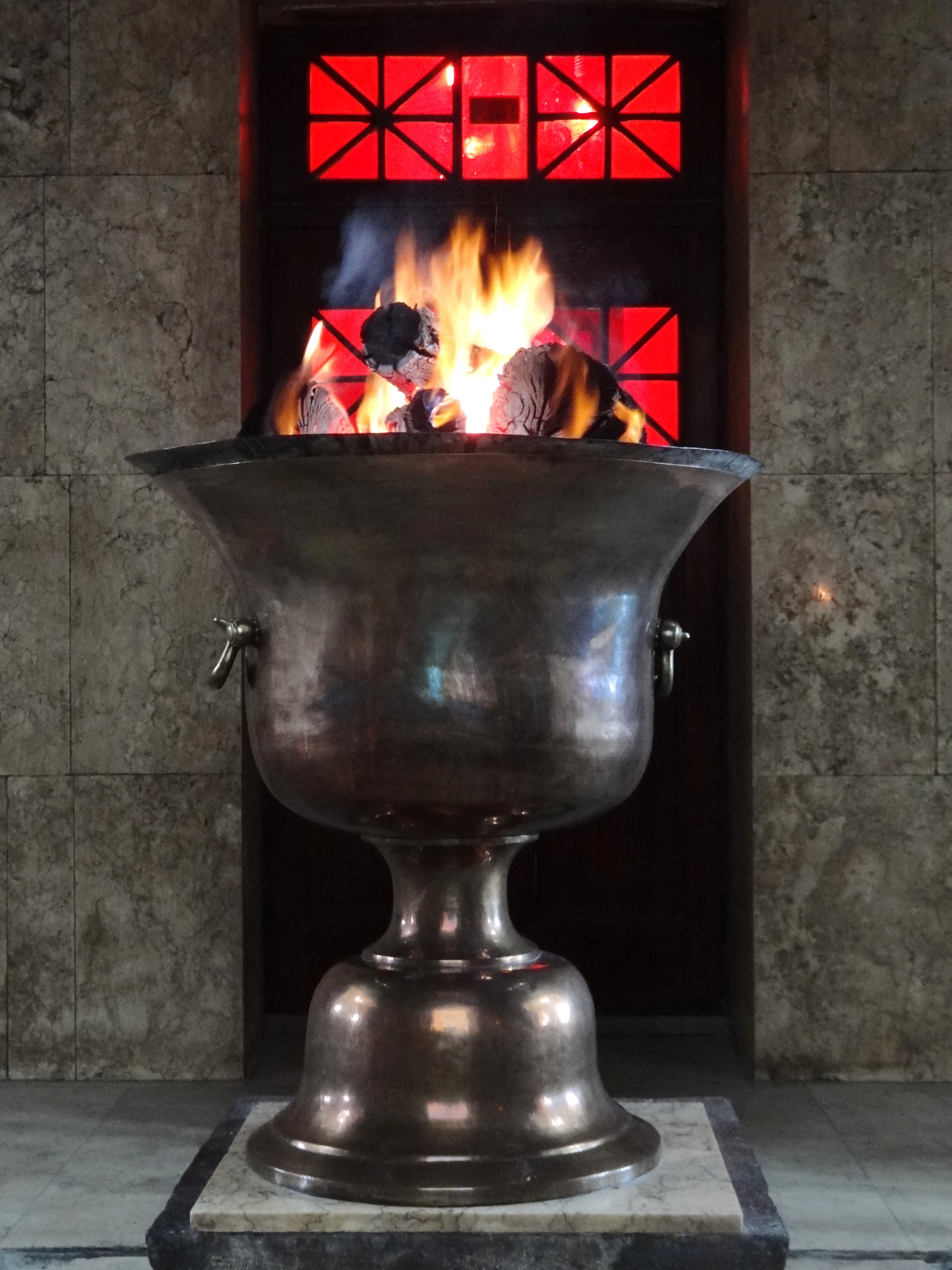
Zoroastrian fire altar (Atashdan), Yazd

A tradition recorded only after the Sasanian period explains the preparation of a great sacred fire. Embers from numerous fires, even lightning fire, were purified repeatedly, combined, and consecrated. The new fire was carried in procession to its sanctuary, where it was installed pad wahrāmīh, “victoriously.” The accompanying priests bore swords and maces. Some weapons were then hung on the sanctuary walls to mark the fire's warrior character and its never-ending struggle against everything hostile to asha. The earliest name of a great temple fire was probably ātar-vərəθraγan, “victorious fire.” By the late Achaemenid age, Persian armies carried embers from a sacred fire before them as a protective emblem. In Middle Persian, the adjective vərəθraγan- merged in form with the noun meaning victory, and the designation came to be understood as the fire of Wahram or Bahram, the popular yazata of victory.

Literary and linguistic evidence indicates that fire temples were spread across Iranian lands from Asia Minor to the Indian satrapies by the end of the Achaemenid period. Many seem to have survived Alexander's conquest and the foreign rule that followed. Diodorus Siculus reports in 17.114 that Alexander, while honoring his dead friend Hephaistion, ordered the people of Asia to extinguish their sacred fires, as the Persians did when a king died. This report has often been taken to concern temple flames, although an alternative reading favors household fires, since all ritually pure fire was sacred to Zoroastrians. The Letter of Tansar, a third-century CE source, indicates that Parthian vassal rulers could establish fires belonging to their dynasties. The Arsacid dynastic fire may have stood at Asaak in northeastern Iran, where Isidore of Charax says Arsaces was first proclaimed king.

Persian communities continued maintaining temple fires under foreign rule in Asia Minor. Around the turn of the Common Era, Strabo distinguished two kinds of Magian sanctuary in Cappadocia. One housed Persian gods and perhaps their images. The others, called pyratheia, were fire enclosures. They contained an altar piled with ash and a fire kept alight by the magi. The priests entered each day, carried their bundles of rods or barsom, and chanted before the fire for about an hour. Lesser sacred fires, unlike the great “victorious fires” that burned brightly without interruption, could be left to “sleep” (xuft) under hot ash between prayers and offerings. Fresh dry wood placed on the embers eventually rekindled the flames. Although temple fires burned wood, worshippers also paid reverence to natural naphtha fires in different parts of Iran.

The three oldest great sacred fires known by name are Azar Burzen-Mihr, Azar Farnbag, and Azar Gushnasp. All three are thought to receive indirect mention in verses 5–6 of a late portion of the Ātaš Niyāyišn. They had probably been founded no later than the Parthian period, since in Sasanian times people already viewed them as immensely ancient. Their temples stood on hills, continuing the older custom of worship in high places recorded by Herodotus. In Sasanian times, they were located respectively in Parthia, Persia, and Media. The much-revered fire at Karkuy in Sistan made a fourth major center, giving each quarter of Iran its own great fire.

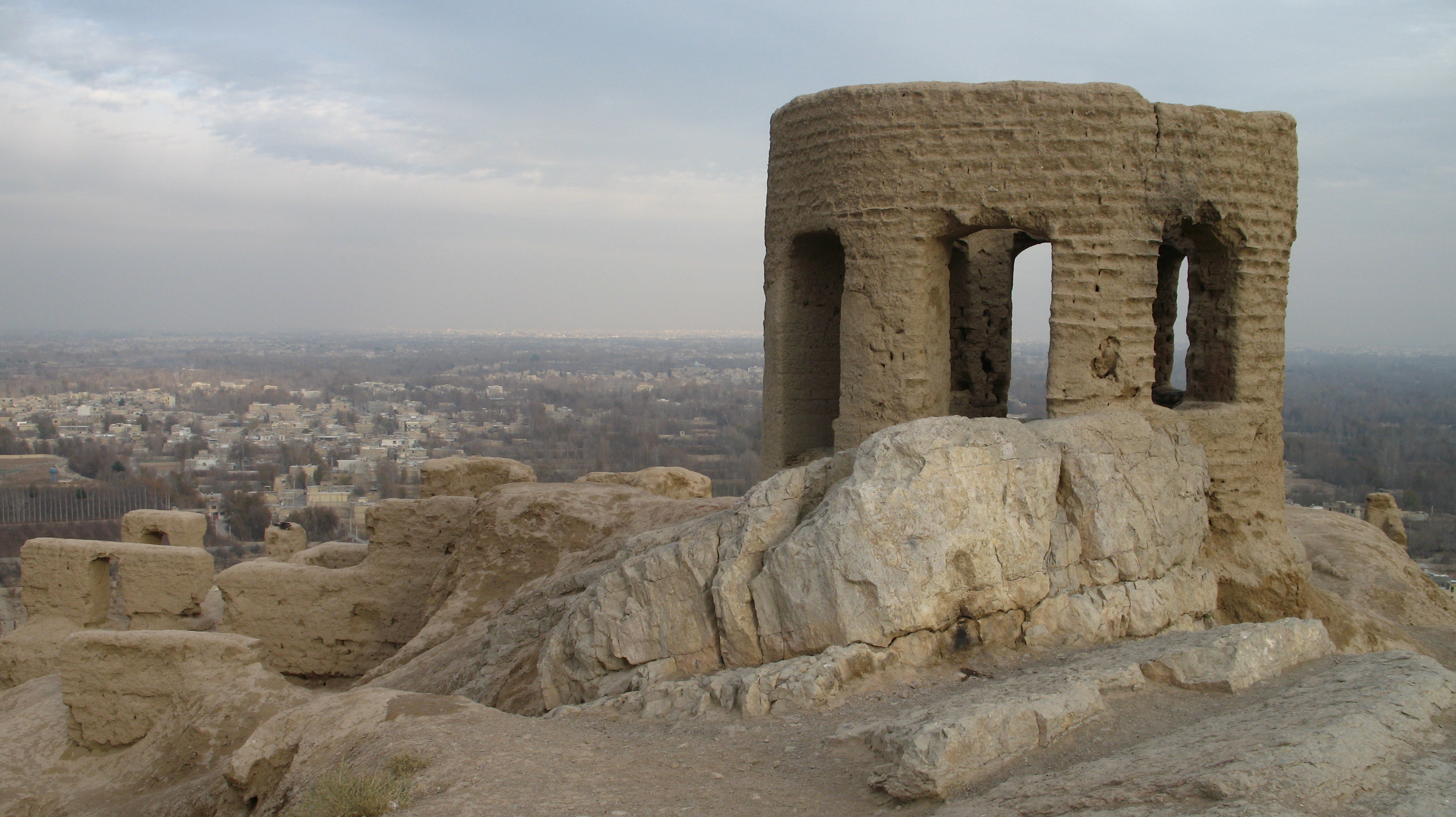
Remains of a fire temple

The Ātaš Niyāyišn invokes the spiritual benefits of fire. The ninth day of every month and the ninth month of the year are dedicated to it. Yasna 62 offers sacrifice, homage, praise, and blessings to Fire as Ohrmazd's son, calling it worthy of worship in human homes. The prayer wishes salvation upon a truthful worshipper approaching with wood, baresman twigs, flesh, and a mortar. Fire is to receive prescribed wood, fragrance, sacred butter, and properly placed andirons, with both its maturity and the quantity of its nourishment measured according to ritual rules. The prayer asks it to shine, grow, and remain continuously alight in the house, furthering the heroic renewal and all progress until the millennial renovation has been fulfilled.

The same prayer seeks swift and plentiful glory, nourishment, and booty. It asks for a broad and ever-growing understanding, a nimble tongue capable of speech and comprehension, an undistracted mind, and lasting virile strength. The desired descendants are steady on their feet, alert on watch without sleeping for even a third of the day or night, and quick to rise from bed. They are to be legitimate, wakeful, and able to nurture or reclaim others, maintain order in assemblies, and draw people together through speech and influence. They are to gain power, skill, and many followers, free others from oppression, increase the standing of the petitioner's line, vis, zantu, and province, and give firm, righteous orders within the province. Further requests seek instructors now and forever, the brilliant and glorious heavenly life of the righteous, a good reward and reputation, and long preparation of the soul for what lies ahead.

Fire, in turn, admonishes those for whom it cooks the morning and evening meals to give it good and healthful care as true worshippers. It examines the hands of everyone who approaches, asking what one mate brings to another, what a person abroad brings to someone at home. The prayer also hails fire as a generous, swift-driving charioteer. When someone brings properly measured and purified dry wood, sanctified baresman, or the Hadhanaepata plant, fire is satisfied rather than offended and responds with a blessing. It wishes the giver numerous cattle and people, an active mind and soul, a blessed life, and a long succession of nights lived in happiness. The wood is chosen to burn and prepared with the blessing of ritual truth. The final verse turns toward the waters, honoring their flow, their ebb, the sound of their waves, and the wish to win their favor through praise.

== Iconography ==
Azar on a Kushan coin

Sassanian coin with fire altar

At Pasargadae, raised fire holders of the type commonly called Zoroastrian “fire altars” survive from the time of Cyrus the Great. One may have carried the royal household flame, raised to the standing of a dynastic fire and maintained for the length of the king's reign. Identifications of a personified fire god in later Iranian art are less secure. Sasanian engravings include a bust emerging from the flames of a fire altar on the reverse of silver drahms, while Sogdian representations permit more than one interpretation. By contrast, the Bactrian Aθšo is the one continuation of the fire god that can be identified confidently by human form.

Coins of the Kushan kings Kanishka and Huvishka show Aθšo bearded and wearing a diadem, traits that he shares with other deities. Flames frequently rise from his shoulders, although that feature also occurs on the Bactrian khwarrah, or Farr. Flames enveloping his body distinguish him more strongly. He is shown with fire tongs, and some coins depict him mounted and presenting a diadem. Outside Kushan coinage, he is probably attested only in the Bactrian personal name αþφαρδαρο, Ašfardaro, interpreted as “Best of/through fire.” His appearances on later coin issues decline as those of khwarrh increase, possibly reflecting a broader shift in Bactrian Zoroastrianism. The evidence from personal names also differs. Khwarrah is common in theophoric names in post-Kushan documents, while Aθšo is not.

== In technology ==
Atar is the name of a French jet engine, developed and produced by the SNECMA company.

== See also ==
- Aban, "the waters", which is of similar importance to Zoroastrianism.
- The Gathas, the most sacred texts of the Avesta
- Yazatas and Amesha Spentas as Zoroastrian divinities
- Dedication to Adar in the Zoroastrian calendar
- Agni
- Luminiferous aether
- Eitr, original substance of the original being, Ymir, in the old Norse cosmology
- Eternal flame
