= Faravahar =

Guardian spirits in Zoroastrianism

Fravahr
- Spirits of the righteous dead, Army of heaven, Yazata
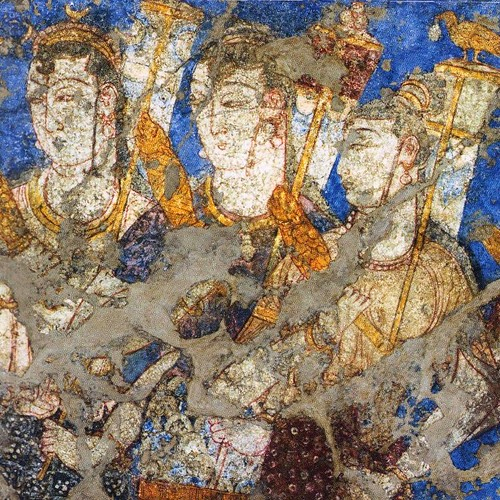
- Fravahrs in Panjikent murals depicted as female or androgenous warriors
- Other names: Fravaši, Fravahr, Fraward, Frōhar, Foruhar, Faravahar, Farvardīn
- Affiliation: The Thirty-Three Deities, Guardians of the Days of the Month
- Abode: Spiritual realm (Mēnōg), upper air
- Attributes: The souls of the dead, ancestors, protective warrior-spirits, maintainers of the natural world, army of heaven, spirits of rain and bearing of sons
- Day: 19th day of each Zoroastrian month
- Number: Innumerable
- Gender: Male and female, depicted as all-female or androgynous
- Region: Iran, Central Asia
- Festivals: Frawardigan/Hamaspaθmaēdaya

Equivalents
- Christian: Guardian angel
- Hindu: Pitri

Faravahar (Persian: فَرَوَهَر), also known as Fravashi (Avestan: 𐬟𐬭𐬀𐬎𐬎𐬀𐬴𐬌, romanized: frauuaṣ̌i, /frəˈvɑːʃi/), Fravahr (Middle Persian: frawahr, Book Pahlavi: plwʾhl), Foruhar (Persian: فروهر]), or Fraward (Middle Persian: fraward, Book Pahlavi: plwltʾ), refers in Zoroastrianism to a class of yazata characterized as wandering spirits of the air, protective spirits of the righteous, and the personal spiritual essence of individuals, whether living, deceased, or yet to be born. The Fravahr is considered one of the essential spiritual components of a person, described as the “everlasting and heavenly tutelary of material beings,” alongside other faculties such as axw (“vital strength”), baodah (“perception”), and urvan (“soul”).

The Fravahr originated as spirits of heroic warriors who protected their living descendants, distinct from ordinary souls (urvans) of the dead. Their cult conflicted with Zoroaster's teachings on the afterlife but was gradually incorporated into Zoroastrianism through association with the older and popular cult of the urvan. This integration included adopting ancestral rituals and festivals, eventually securing the fravahr recognition alongside the Yazatas, despite lingering theological contradictions.

The Fravahrs were powerful warriors clad in iron armour, invoked during combat and bloodshed to grant victory to their worshippers. In their Yašt, they are celebrated with martial epithets such as “mighty” and “wholly victorious,” the latter otherwise reserved for Mithra, the yazata of war. Elsewhere in Yašt 13, the Fravahrs are described as swift, valiant, combative, and bloodstained, striking down their opponents and destroying enemy forces. They are also credited with strengthening the Xštāvis and Karšazids, enabling them to defeat the Turanian Dānus in battle.

The last days of a year, called frawardigan (compare New Persian farvardin, first month within the Persian calendar), are dedicated to the fravahr. The first month of the year as well as the 19th day of each month are considered under the protection of, and named after, the fravahr.

== Etymology ==
The New Persian word فروهر is read as foruhar or faravahar (pronounced as furōhar or furūhar in Classical Persian). The Middle Persian forms were frawahr (Book Pahlavi: plwʾhl, Manichaean: prwhr), frōhar (recorded in Pazend as 𐬟𐬭𐬋𐬵𐬀𐬭; it is a later form of the previous form), and fraward (Book Pahlavi: plwlt', Manichaean: frwrd), which was directly from Old Persian *fravarti-. The Avestan language form was frauuaṣ̌i (𐬟𐬭𐬀𐬎𐬎𐬀𐬴𐬌).

While It seems unlikely that there will ever be unanimity about the etymology of the term, the word is commonly perceived to have var- "to choose," as its root. From reconstructed *fravarti (/rt/ clusters in Avestan usually appear as /š/), fravashi could then mean "one who has been selected (for exaltation)." The same root, in the sense of "to choose/profess a faith," is found in the word fravarane, the name of the Zoroastrian credo.

Other interpretations take other meanings of var- into consideration: Either as var- "to cover" that in a bahuvrihi with fra- "to ward" provides "protective valor," or a derivation from var- "to make/be pregnant" which gives "promoter of birth, birth-spirit." One interpretation considers a derivation from vart- "turn" hence "turning away, departing, death." The Epistles of Zadspram, a 10th century exegetical work, derives fravashi from fra-vaxsh "to grow forth."

In the 9/10th-century works of Zoroastrian tradition, the Pahlavi books, Avestan fravashi continues as Middle Persian fravard (and -w- forms, fraward etc), fravahr, fravash or fravaksh.

== History and evolution ==
There is considerable scholarly agreement that, in the Younger Avesta, the Fravahr was understood as the spirit of a mighty and valiant warrior who, through his heroic deeds, had attained a more fortunate fate after death than the souls (urvans) of ordinary people. The veneration of these heroic warrior-spirits is thought to have developed during the Iranian heroic age of the second millennium BC, following the separation of the Iranian and Indo-Aryan peoples.

Unlike the urvan, which travelled along dark paths to the underworld realm of the dead, the Fravahr inhabited the upper air and, when properly venerated, could descend like a bird to aid living relatives, fighting invisibly alongside them in battle. Fravahrs were also believed to compete with one another to secure life-giving rainwater for their descendants' cattle and crops. The cult of the Fravahrs is thought to have adopted elements from the much older cult of departed souls, which had parallels in the Vedic worship of the ancestral “fathers” (pitaras) and roots extending through Proto-Indo-Iranian to Proto-Indo-European times. By contrast, the cult of the Fravahrs was distinctively Iranian. In the Bundahišn, the Fravahrs are identified with the urvans: Ohrmazd consults the “fravahrs of men” and offers them a choice between remaining in his presence or descending into the material world to inhabit human bodies and combat Druj. This account, however, creates difficulties in reconciling their incarnation as human souls with their other roles as a heavenly army and sustainers of the cosmos.

In some Zoroastrian texts, however, the urvan and Fravahr are treated as two distinct components of a person's immaterial being. According to the Dēnkard, the ruvan (urvan) possesses free will and acts according to its own choices, whereas the Fravahr belongs to nature and acts in accordance with it, being inherently good and incorruptible. The Bundahišn, meanwhile, states that a person's ruvan resides within the body while the Fravahr remains with Ohrmazd, the two becoming united at death. The Dēnkard further maintains that only the ruvan can descend into hell, while the Fravahrs remain in heaven. This distinction also raises questions about the compatibility of Fravahr veneration with Zoroaster's teachings. His doctrine of judgment after death, which assigned the souls of the righteous to paradise, those of the “mixed ones” to an intermediate realm, and those of the wicked to a place of torment, appears to have left little room for a cult of the departed.

The adherents of the Fravahr cult appear to have struggled to secure its recognition as compatible with Zoroastrian doctrine, using their considerable influence to associate it with the cult of the urvan, though not always consistently. Its eventual acceptance was probably aided by members of the Zoroastrian clergy, including teachers and leaders of priestly colleges. As part of this process, the great annual feast of Hamaspaθmaēdaya, traditionally an Iranian festival commemorating departed souls, was associated with the Fravahrs, who came to be invoked in place of the urvans. In its later, extended form, the festival became known as Rōzān Fravardīgān, subsequently shortened to Fravardīgān. A passage in Yašt 13 describes the Fravahrs returning to their former dwellings at Hamaspaθmaēdaya, seeking to be praised by name and to receive offerings of meat and clothing, while granting blessings to their worshippers in return. These verses may originally have referred to the urvans.

The conception of the heroic protector-spirit thus became intertwined with that of the guardian ancestor-spirit, concerned with the welfare of its living descendants. Given the importance of ancestor worship in the Iranian cult of departed souls, it is possible that rites dedicated to the Fravahrs and urvans had already overlapped or been performed alongside one another in pre-Zoroastrian times. Over time, Fravahr also came to be used as a general term of respect for the dead. The Fravahrs acquired a place in the Zoroastrian calendar, with a month dedicated to them and a name-day celebration on the day of Fravardīn in the month of Fravardīn. Their inclusion in the monthly calendar placed them on an equal footing with the yazatas. The successful incorporation of their cult appears to have depended largely on its fusion with the more widespread cult of the urvan. Despite the theological inconsistencies arising from the Fravahrs' place within Zoroaster's teachings, particularly the central doctrine of judgment after death, their acceptance did not fundamentally undermine the moral or doctrinal foundations of Zoroastrianism.

== In myth and scripture ==
The Fravahrs are described as powerful beings who remain silent, possess keen hearing, and have large, watchful eyes. Unlike the other yazatas, who emanated from Ohrmazd, the Fravahrs are believed to have existed before creation, although their own origins are never explained.

At the beginning of Yašt 13, Ohrmazd declares that he created the surrounding sky and the vast earth, which sustains waters, plants, livestock, and humanity, through the splendour and glory of the mighty and victorious Fravahrs. Throughout the hymn, they are credited with various cosmic functions essential to sustaining the material world and human life. Through their splendour and glory, waters flow, plants flourish, heavenly bodies follow their appointed paths, and women bear sons. These functions may originally have belonged to the urvans, with broader cosmic responsibilities subsequently attributed to the Fravahrs to enhance their status.

The Fravahrs, numbering 99,999, are said to guard the shining waters of Vourukaša and the seed of Zoroaster, although the Bundahišn also assigns this protective role to Ardvisur Anahid. In accounts of Zoroaster's birth, his Fravahr is brought down by Bahman and Ordibehesht to unite with his bodily substance.

The Fravahrs also assist Tir, the deity associated with Sirius and rainfall, who initiates the circulation of water between the earth and heavens. Their intervention comes at the end of an elaborate sequence of celestial events. First, Tir travels toward the firmament, escapes the shooting stars, and gains control of the heavenly reservoir of waters, supplied by the Vourukaša Sea. The star Satavaēsa then drives the mists arising from this reservoir toward the earth, while the wind sets the clouds in motion. Next, Apam Napat and the Khvarenah, powers associated with the waters, distribute them among the different regions. Only after these stages do the Fravahrs bring about rainfall, seeking to secure life-giving water for their families and descendants.

The Fravahrs were also regarded as warriors (artēštārān) who fought continuously against the Druj. According to the Bundahišn, when Ahriman pierced the sky and entered the world, the Fravahrs assembled in tightly packed ranks along the rim of the heavens, mounted and armed with spears, to confine him within the world. Two surviving depictions at Pendjikent, dating to the early eighth century AD, portray figures identified as female Fravahrs. In the painting from Pendjikent 6/III, they are shown protecting warriors in battle.

References to Garshasp's role in the final events of the world also appear in the Avesta. In Yašt 13.61, his body (kərp) is said to be guarded by 99,999 Fravahrs of the righteous (aṣ̌auuan), or “sustainers of the cosmic order.” Manuchehr cites this passage in the Dādestān ī dēnīg (16.5). Garshasp is described as lying beneath the snow in a wormwood bush (dlm(n)k, possibly Persian dermana), protected by the Fravahrs while awaiting his awakening and final task. According to the Mēnōy ī xrad (61.20–21), Ohrmazd and the Amahraspands appointed 99,999 Fravahrs to guard his body (tan) near Mount Damavand, on the plain of Pēšānsēy. The plain is described as having no trees, but supporting barley, other edible plants, and apparently wormwood.

== Cult and worship ==
Hamaspaθmaēdaya was an important festival held around the spring equinox, during which the Fravahrs were believed to leave the villages and towns for ten days. During this period, Persians placed food in temples as offerings to the spirits of the dead, the Fravahrs. In Khwarazm, ossuary buildings were known as Frawartīk, meaning “house of the Fravahrs.”

The Fravahrs were also invoked in rituals preceding battle. Frantz Grenet has tentatively interpreted a series of painted scenes as depicting ritual homages to the Fravahrs of ancient kings, resembling those addressed to the Pishdadian and Kayanian rulers in Yašt 13.130–132, from Yima to Kavi Haosravah, as well as to Kavi Vištāspa in Yašt 13.99–100.

== See also ==
- Shahbaz (bird)

== General and cited sources ==
- Boyce, M. (2000). "Fravaši". Encyclopaedia Iranica. Vol. X, Fasc. 2. pp. 195–199.
- Curtis, Vesta Sarkhosh (2007). "Religious iconography on ancient Iranian coins". Journal of Late Antiquity. London: 413–434.
- Olbrycht, Marek Jan (2016). "The Sacral Kingship of the early Arsacids. I. Fire Cult and Kingly Glory". Anabasis. Studia Classica et Orientalia: 91–106.

Works cited

- Bailey, Harold Walter (1943), Zoroastrian Problems in the Ninth-Century Books, Ratanbai Katrak Lectures, Oxford: Clarendon.
- Boyce, Mary (2001a), "Fravaši", Encyclopedia Iranica, vol. 10, Costa Mesa: Mazda, pp. 195–199
- Boyce, Mary (2001b), "Frawardīn Yašt", Encyclopedia Iranica, vol. 10, Costa Mesa: Mazda, pp. 199–201.
- Malandra, William (1971), The Fravaši Yašt, Ann Arbor: University Microfilms, archived from the original on 14 August 2009
- Narten, Joanna (1985), "Avestisch frauuaši", Indo-Iranian Journal, 28: 35–48, doi:10.1163/000000085790081930
