= Gahambars =

Seasonal festival in Zoroastrian calendar

The seasonal festivals, called gahambars (meaning "proper season"), occur six times a year. Due to the peculiarities of the Shahenshahi and Kadmi variants of the Zoroastrian calendar, in those variants the seasonal festivals are actually celebrated many months in advance and are therefore said to reflect the six "primordial creations" of Ahura Mazda, otherwise known as the Amesha Spentas. Each of these festivals is celebrated over five days. The six festivals are:

- Maidyozarem Gahambar ('mid-spring' feast), April 30 – May 4
- Maidyoshahem Gahambar ('mid-summer' feast), June 29 – July 3
- Paitishahem Gahambar (feast of 'bringing in the harvest'), September 12 – September 16
- Ayathrem Gahambar ('bringing home the herds'), October 12 – October 16
- Maidyarem Gahambar ('mid-year'/winter feast), December 31 – January 4
- Hamaspathmaidyem Gahambar (feast of 'all souls', literally 'coming of the whole group'), March 16 – March 20

== See also ==
- Zoroastrian festivals
- Nowruz
- Sadeh
