= Karkuh, Sistan and Baluchestan =

Karkuh كركوه
- Village
- Location within Iran
- Coordinates: 31°09′31″N 61°45′10″E
- Country: Iran
- Province: Sistan and Baluchestan
- County: Hirmand
- Bakhsh: Central
- Rural District: Dust Mohammad

Population (2006)
  - Total: 288
- Time zone: UTC+3:30 (IRST)
  - Summer (DST): UTC+4:30 (IRDT)

Karkuh (Persian: كركوه, also Romanized as Karkūh; also known as Karkū) is a village in Dust Mohammad Rural District, in the Central District of Hirmand County, Sistan and Baluchestan Province, Iran. At the 2006 census, its population was 288, in 67 families.
