= Zoroastrian calendar =

Religious date system

Adherents of Zoroastrianism use three distinct versions of traditional calendars for liturgical purposes. Those all derive from medieval Iranian calendars and ultimately are based on the Babylonian calendar as used in the Achaemenid Empire. Qadimi or Kadmi ("ancient") is a traditional reckoning introduced in 1006. Shahanshahi ("imperial") is a calendar reconstructed from the 10th century text Denkard. Fasli is a term for a 1906 adaptation of the 11th century Jalali calendar following a proposal by Kharshedji Rustomji Cama made in the 1860s.

A number of Calendar eras are in use:

- A tradition of counting years from the birth of Zoroaster was reported from India in the 19th century. There was a dispute between factions variously preferring an era of 389 BCE, 538 BCE, or 637 BCE.
- The "Yazdegerdi era" (also Yazdegirdi or Yazdgerdi) counts from the accession of the last Sassanid ruler, Yazdegerd III (16 June 632 CE). This convention was proposed by Cama in the 1860s but has since also been used in conjunctions with Qadimi or Shahanshahi reckoning. An alternative "Magian era" (era Magorum or Tarikh al-majus) was set at the date of Yazdegerd's death in 652.
- "Z.E.R." or "Zarathushtrian Religious Era" is a convention introduced in 1990 by the Zarathushtrian Assembly of California set at the vernal equinox (Nowruz) of 1738 BCE (−1737 in the astronomical year numbering).

== History ==
=== Achaemenid period ===
Calendrical traditions in ancient Iran can be traced back to the 2nd millennium B.C. Yet the earliest fully preserved calendar actually dates only from the Achaemenid Empire period, starting in the sixth century BC.

The Old Persian calendar, similar to the Babylonian calendar, was lunisolar, with twelve months of thirty days each. The Old Persian inscriptions mention only eight month names, so the other four names have been reconstructed from the Elamite transcriptions.

The Achaemenids used the lunisolar calendar at least until 459 B.C., because this is the date of the last preserved document using such a calendar.

The Babylonian calendar, being lunisolar, used an intercalary month roughly once every third year.

It is not clear exactly when the Zoroastrian calendar was first introduced. Nevertheless, because of its similarities with the Egyptian calendrical system, it can be hypothesized that its introduction was in the 5th century BCE, in the period during which Egypt was ruled by the Achaemenids. According to S. Stern, this happened during the first century of Achaemenid rule over Egypt, or from 525 to 430 BCE.

Scholars distinguish between the Old Avestan and a Later Avestan calendars. However, given that both have been reconstructed on the basis of similar sources, there are some disputes in this area.

The earliest Zoroastrian calendar follows the Babylonian in relating the seventh and other days of the month to Ahura Mazda.

In the civil calendar, intercalations did not always follow a regular pattern, but during the reign of Artaxerxes II (circa 380 BCE) astronomers utilised a 19-year cycle which required the addition of a month called Addaru II in years 3, 6, 8, 11, 14 and 19, and the month Ululu II in year 17 of the cycle.

A 365-day calendar, with months largely identical to the Egyptian calendar, was introduced shortly after the conquest of Egypt by the Achaemenid ruler Cambyses (c. 525 BCE).

Scholars are divided on whether this 365 day calendar was in fact preceded by a 360-day calendar of Zoroastrian observances.

In 2012, new information from Central Asia was published in regard to Zoroastrian Calendar. It came from the Khalili Collection of Aramaic Documents. Archival documents in Aramaic were found, as issued by the Achaemenid satrap of Bactria. These are 48 official documents from the court archive in Bactra (modern Balkh); they date to shortly before and after the time of Alexander’s conquest of the area. Thirty of these documents are written on leather. In these Bactrian Aramaic documents, Zoroastrian day‐names have been discovered, which is believed to be the earliest archaeologically attested usage of these day-names. Mainly these documents consist of the correspondence of the official Akhvamazda of Bactria dating from 354 to 324 BCE.

=== Hellenistic period ===
Following Alexander's invasion of Persia in 330 BCE, the Seleucid (312–248 BCE) instituted the Hellenic practice of counting years from the start of a fixed era, as opposed to using regnal years.

The regnal era of Alexander is now referred to as the Seleucid era.

The Parthians (150–224 CE), who succeeded the Seleucids, continued the Seleucid/Hellenic tradition.

=== Parthian to Sassanid period ===
In 224 CE, when the Babylonian calendar was replaced by the Zoroastrian, 1 Frawardin and the New Year celebration of Nawruz had drifted to 1 October. The older custom of counting regnal years from the monarch's coronation was reinstated. At this point the calendar was realigned with the seasons by delaying the epagomenal days by eight months (so that they now preceded the start of the ninth month) and adjusting the dates of the gahanbars (farming festivals) accordingly.

This caused confusion, since the new year now fell five days earlier than before, and some people continued to observe the old date. After 46 years (226–272 CE), with 1 Frawardin now on 19 September, another calendar reform was implemented by Ardashir's grandson Hormazd I (272–273 CE). During the first years after implementation of the new Gatha days, the population had not universally adopted the new dates for religious festivals, resulting in "official" celebrations takings place five days earlier than popular celebrations. In later years the population had observed the Gatha days, but the original five day discrepancy persisted. Hormazd's reform was to link the popular and official observance dates to form continual six-day feasts. Nawruz was an exception: the first and the sixth days of the month were celebrated as different occasions. Lesser Nawruz was observed on 1 Frawardin. 6 Frawardin became Greater Nawruz, a day of special festivity. Around the 10th century CE, the Greater Nawruz was associated with the return of the legendary king, Jamsed; in contemporary practice it is kept as the symbolic observance of Zoroaster's birthday, or Khordad Sal.

Mary Boyce has argued that sometime between 399 CE and 518 CE the six-day festivals were compressed to five days. The major feasts, or gahambars, of contemporary Zoroastrian practice, are still kept as five-day observances today.

=== Medieval period ===
The Bundahishn, a treatise written in the early Islamic period (8th or 9th century) replaces the "Age of Alexander" with an "Age of Zoroaster", placed "258 years before Alexander" (consistent with the date given by Ammianus Marcellinus).

By the reign of Yazdegird III (632–651 CE), the religious celebrations were again somewhat adrift with respect to their proper seasons. The calendar had continued to slip against the Julian calendar since the previous reform at the rate of one day every four years. Therefore, in 632, the new year was celebrated on 16 June. By the 9th century, the Zoroastrian theologian Zadspram had noted that the state of affairs was less than optimal, and estimated that at the time of Final Judgement the two systems would be out of sync by four years.

== Calendar eras ==
Zoroastrian Yazdegerd Era (Yazdegardi Era) starts on 16 June 632 CE. Yazdegird III was the last monarch of the Sasanian dynasty, and since the custom at that time was to count regnal years since the monarch ascended the throne, the reckoning of years was continued, in the absence of a Zoroastrian monarch, among some Zoroastrians.

Zoroastrian dates are distinguished by the suffix Y.Z. for "Yazdegirdi Era". The usage "AY" is also found.

Yet another form of reckoning is the Zarathushtrian (Zoroastrian) Religious Era (Z.E.R./ZRE), adopted in 1990 CE by the Zarathushtrian Assembly of California. This is based on the putative association of the mission of Zoroaster with the dawn of the astrological Age of Aries, calculated for this purpose to have been the northern vernal equinox of 1738 BCE. Hence the year 3738 ZRE began in 2000 CE. The Zoroastrian community, both in Iran and in diaspora, have also been said to have accepted it, the former doing so in 1993 CE. A briefing paper from the Zoroastrian Trust Funds of Europe indicates that they recognise this usage to have been pragmatically adopted by Zoroastrians in Iran, while the diaspora continues to use the YZ system.

== Qadimi calendar ==
The Qadimi (also Qadmi, Kadimi, Kudmi) or "ancient" calendar is the traditional calendar in use since 1006 CE.

In 1006 CE, the month Frawardin had returned to the correct position so that 1 Frawardin coincided with the northern vernal equinox. The religious festivals were therefore returned to their traditional months, with Nawruz once again being celebrated on 1 Frawardin.

The Julian Day Number corresponding to 16 June 632 CE is 1952063.

The Julian Day Number of Nowruz, the first day, of Year Y of the Yazdegirdi Era is therefore 1952063 + (Y − 1) × 365.

22 July AD 2000 was Nowruz and the first day of 1370 Y.Z. (or 3738 ZRE) according to the Qadimi reckoning.

In the Julian year 1300 CE, 669 Y.Z. began on 1 January, and 670 Y.Z. on 31 December of the same year.

== Shahanshahi calendar ==
The Shahanshahi calendar (also Shahenshahi, Shahenshai, Shenshai) or "imperial" calendar is the system described in Denkard, a 9th-century Zoroastrian text. It explicitly acknowledged several methods of intercalation:

- a leap-day every 4 years;
- adding ten days every 40 years;
- a leap-month of 30 days once every 120 years;
- 5 months once every 600 years;

1,461 Zoroastrian years equal 1,460 Julian years.

The Denkard then states:

The time of six hours should be kept apart from (i.e. not to be added to) the last days of the year for many years, till (the hours) amount to (a definite period of time) ... And it is the admonition of the good faith that the rectification (of the calendar) should not be made till a month is completed (i.e. till the additional six hours every year amount to a month at the end of a hundred and twenty. years). And more than a period of five months should not be allowed (to accumulate.) [Parentheses appear as in original.]

The Denkard – which was not Zoroastrian scripture but a religious manual – therefore favoured the solution of a leap-month once every 120 years, with a fall-back of adding 5 months after 600 years if this were missed. This practice was not, however, adopted by Zoroastrians living in Islamic Persia.

The Parsis had knowledge of The Denkard's proposal: at some point between 1125 and 1129, the Parsi-Zoroastrians of the Indian subcontinent inserted such an embolismic month, named Aspandarmad vahizak (the month of Aspandarmad but with the suffix vahizak). That month would also be the last month intercalated: subsequent generations of Parsis neglected to insert a thirteenth month.

Around 1720 CE, an Iranian Zoroastrian priest named Jamasp Peshotan Velati travelled from Iran to India. Upon his arrival, he discovered that there was a difference of a month between the Parsi calendar and his own calendar. Velati brought this discrepancy to the attention of the priests of Surat, but no consensus as to which calendar was correct was reached. Around 1740 CE, some influential priests argued that since their visitor had been from the ancient 'homeland', his version of the calendar must be correct, and their own must be wrong. On 6 June 1745 CE (Julian), a number of Parsis in and around Surat adopted the calendar which had continued in use in Iran, now to be identified as the Qadimi reckoning. Other Parsis continued to use the reckoning which had become traditional in India, and call their calendar Shahanshahi.

Arzan Lali the author of Zoroastrian Calendar Services (ZCS) website (zcserv.com) comments that "... adherents of other variants of the Zoroastrian calendar denigrate the Shenshai or Shahenshahi as 'royalist'."

21 August 2000 CE was Nawruz, and the first day of 1370 Y.Z. (or 3738 ZRE) according to the Shahanshahi reckoning.

Because the one-off intercalation of 30 days happened sometime before the Nawruz of 1129 CE, we can be confident that in that Julian year, 498 YZ began on 12 February by the Qadimi reckoning, but 14 March by the recently introduced Shahanshahi.

The Julian Day Number of Nawruz, the first day, of all subsequent Shahanshahi years Y of the Yazdegirdi Era is therefore 1952093 + (Y − 1) × 365.

== Fasli calendar ==
At the start of the 20th century, Khurshedji Cama, a Bombay Parsi, founded the "Zarthosti Fasili Sal Mandal", or Zoroastrian Seasonal-Year Society. In 1906, the society published its proposal for a Zoroastrian calendar which was synchronised with the seasons. This Fasli calendar, as it became known, was based on the Jalali calendar introduced in 1079 during the reign of the Seljuk Malik Shah and which had been well received in agrarian communities.

The Fasli proposal had two useful features: a leap-day once every four years, and harmony with the tropical year. The leap-day, called Avardad-sal-Gah (or in Pahlavi: Ruzevahizak), would be inserted, when required, after the five existing Gatha days at the end of the year. New Year's Day would be kept on the northward vernal equinox, and if the leap-day was applied correctly, would not drift away from the spring. The Fasli society also claimed that their calendar was an accurate religious calendar, as opposed to the other two calendars, which they asserted were only political.

The new calendar received little support from the Indian Zoroastrian community, since it was considered to contradict the injunctions expressed in the Denkard. In Iran, however, the Fasli calendar gained momentum following a campaign in 1930 to persuade the Iranian Zoroastrians to adopt it, under the title of the Bastani (traditional) calendar. In AD 1925, the Iranian Parliament had introduced a new Iranian calendar, which (independent of the Fasli movement) incorporated both points proposed by the Fasili Society, and since the Iranian national calendar had also retained the Zoroastrian names of the months, it was not a big step to integrate the two. The Bastani calendar was duly accepted by many of the Zoroastrians. Many orthodox Iranian Zoroastrians, especially the Sharifabadis of Yazd, continued to use the Qadimi, however.

In 1906 CE, Nawruz of 1276 Y.Z. fell on 15 August for followers of the Qadimi calendar, and 14 September for those observing Shahanshahi. There was therefore a six-month gap between the Fasli and Qadimi New Year observances, and a seven-month gap to the Shahanshahi.

Since there is exactly one Fasli year for every Gregorian year, then day one of the proleptic Fasli calendar would be 21 March (Gregorian) 631 CE, with Year 2 beginning on 21 March 632 CE. But Yazdegird III did not ascend the throne until 19 June 632 CE (Gregorian), leading to the curious quirk that the base date for the reckoning of years ends up in Year 2 of the Fasli calendar.

=== Festivals in leap years ===
The Zoroastrian year, in Qadimi and Shahanshahi observance, concludes with ten days in memory of departed souls: five Mukhtad days on the last 5 days of the 12th month, and five more Mukhtad days, which are also the five-day festival of Hamaspathmaidyem, on the five Gatha days. The penultimate day of the twelfth month is Mareshpand Jashan.

In a common year (non-leap year) of the Fasli observance, Mukhtad is observed 11–20 March, with Hamaspathmaidyem and the Gatha days 16–20 March. Mareshpand Jashan is on 14 March.

In a leap year of the Fasli observance, Mukhtad is observed 10–19 March, with Hamaspathmaidyem and the Gatha days 15–19 March. Mareshpand Jashan is on 13 March. The leap day, 20 March, called Avardad-sal-Gah, is considered a duplication of Wahishtoisht, the fifth Gatha day, but is not reckoned as Mukhtad or Hamaspathmaidyem.

=== Relationship with the Gregorian calendar ===
21 March 2000 CE was Nowruz and the first day of 1370 Y.Z. (or 3738 ZRE) according to the Fasli reckoning.

Ali Jafarey describes the Fasli calendar as

... an almost tropical calendar. It is corrected by observing the leap year.

Webster's online dictionary and various unreferenced sources state that the Fasli calendar follows the Gregorian, and it is shown strictly following the Gregorian calendar in the period AD 2009–2031 in the tables published by R. E. Kadva. The Gregorian calendar itself, however, will not keep 21 March as the date of the northern vernal equinox forever – it has a deviation of one day every 5025 years.

=== Relationship with the Iranian calendar ===
The civil calendar in Iran since 31 March 1925 CE has been the Solar Hejri calendar. This is strictly tied to the actual northward equinox, rather than a mathematical approximation to it. An Iranian day is reckoned to begin at midnight. Iranian time is 3.5 hours ahead of GMT. New Year's Day is defined to be the day, as reckoned by Iranian time, when the northward equinox (the precise moment in time when northern and southern hemispheres of the Earth pass through the point of the Earth's orbit when they are equally illuminated by the Sun) occurs on or before noon of that day, or during the 12 hours following the noon of the preceding day. This means that the pattern of leap years in the Iranian calendar is complex – usually following a 33-year cycle where the leap day is inserted every fourth year, but in year 33 instead of year 32, but with occasional 29 year cycles.

From 1960 to 1995, the northward equinox always fell at such a time that New Year's Day in Iran occurred on the day called 21 March in the Western calendar. But this equivalence was not always true before March 1960, and the exact correspondence broke down again in 1996. In 1959, and at four-year intervals back to 1927, Iranian New Year's Day fell on 22 March in the Gregorian calendar. In 1996, and subsequent Gregorian leap years, Iranian New Year's Day falls on 20 March. The pattern will shift back to a matching set of leap years in 2096 CE.

The sources cited above state that the Fasli calendar both follows the Gregorian and was such that New Year's Day coincided with vernal equinox. These two statements are incompatible. The Fasli calendar cannot track both the Gregorian leap years and strictly start on the vernal equinox; further, any calendar strictly tied to the 'day of the equinox' must define when the day starts and ends, which depends on longitude-

A briefing paper from the Zoroastrian Trust Funds of Europe indicates:

the Irani Zoroastrian calendar does not shift and commences on 21 March. But it is important to note that all Iranians including Zoroastrians celebrate NoRuz (Nawruz) on the actual day of the northward equinox, therefore some years it can be 20 / 22 March.

== Astronomical and mystical aspects ==
The three different Zoroastrian calendar-traditions are similar with regard to the principle of the beginning of the months. They are structurally similar to the Armenian calendar and the Mayan Haab calendar, but different from the Iranian (Jalaali) calendar, the Julian calendar, and the French Revolutionary Calendar, whose epochs of the months are fixed to equinoxes/solstices, as are the signs of western astrology. The Qadimi and the Shahanshahi Zoroastrian calendar use merely five epagomenal days, similar to the French Revolutionary and the Coptic calendar, (although these last two have a sixth epagemonal day every leap year), so their year count slowly travels through the tropical year.

The naming of the months recalls the time of the origination of the Zoroastrian calendar. According to Mary Boyce,

It seems a reasonable surmise that Nawruz, the holiest of them all, with deep doctrinal significance, was founded by Zoroaster himself.

== Future developments ==
The Fasli calendar has become very popular outside India, especially in the West, but many Parsis believe that adding a leap day is against the rules, and they mostly continue to use the Shahanshahi calendar. There is a proposal to correct matters by restoring the leap month, but unless this happens, the Shahanshahi and Qadimi years will continue to start earlier and earlier ... the unrevised Qadimi calendar would eventually coincide with the Fasli calendar in Gregorian year 2508, the Shahanshahi New Year will next fall on 21 March in 2632.

In 1992, all three calendars happened to have the first day of a month on the same day. Many Zoroastrians suggested a consolidation of the calendars: no consensus could be reached, though some took this opportunity to switch to the Fasli observance. Some priests objected on the grounds that if they were to switch, the religious implements they utilised would require re-consecration, at not insignificant expense.

It has also been proposed that the Shahanshahi calendar could be brought back into harmony through the intercalation of whole months.

In the UK, most Zoroastrians are Indians who follow the Shahanshahi calendar. Nevertheless, noting that Iranian Zoroastrians mostly follow the Fasli calendar, the Zoroastrian Trust Funds of Europe marks observances of both calendars.

== Naming of months and days ==
Zoroastrian practice divides time into years (sal or sol), months (mah), weeks, days (ruz, roz, or roj) and hours (lit. "Watches" in Persian) (gah or geh). A day is reckoned to begin at dawn, as attested by Chapter 25 of the 9th century work, the Bundahishn; morning hours before dawn are assigned to the previous calendar day. Each day is divided into five watches:

- Hawan (sunrise to noon)
- Rapithwin or Second Hawan (noon to 3 p.m.)
- Uzerin (3 p.m. to sunset)
- Aiwisruthrem (sunset to midnight)
- Ushahin (midnight to sunrise)

In medieval times, according to the Bundahishn, in winter there were only four periods, with Hawan extending from daybreak until Uziran, with the omission of Rapithwan.

The months and the days of the month in the Zoroastrian calendar are dedicated to, and named after, a divinity or divine concept. The religious importance of the calendar dedications is very significant. Not only does the calendar establish the hierarchy of the major divinities, it ensures the frequent invocation of their names since the divinities of both day and month are mentioned at every Zoroastrian act of worship.

=== Day names ===
The tradition of naming the days and months after divinities was based on a similar Egyptian custom, and dates from when the calendar was set up. "The last evidence for the use ... with Old Persian month-names ... comes from 458 BCE, ... after which the Elamite tablets cease." No dated West-Iranian documents from this period survive, but the fact that the Zoroastrian calendar was created at this time can be inferred from its use in a number of far-flung lands which had formerly been parts of the Achaemenid Empire.

The oldest (though not dateable) testimony for the existence of the day dedications comes from Yasna 16, a section of the Yasna liturgy that is – for the most part – a veneration to the 30 divinities with day-name dedications. The Siroza – a two-part Avesta text with individual dedications to the 30 calendar divinities – has the same sequence.

1.	Dadvah Ahura Mazdā, 2. Vohu Manah, 3. Aša Vahišta, 4. Khšathra Vairya, 5. Spenta Ārmaiti, 6. Haurvatāt, 7. Ameretāt
8.	Dadvah Ahura Mazdā, 9. Ātar, 10. Āpō, 11. Hvar, 12. Māh, 13. Tištrya, 14. Geuš Urvan
15.	Dadvah Ahura Mazdā, 16. Mithra, 17. Sraoša, 18. Rašnu, 19. Fravašayō, 20. Verethragna, 21. Rāman, 22. Vāta
23.	Dadvah Ahura Mazdā, 24. Daēna, 25. Aši, 26. Arštāt, 27. Asmān, 28. Zam, 29. Manthra Spenta, 30. Anaghra Raočā.

The quaternary dedication to Ahura Mazda was perhaps a compromise between orthodox and heterodox factions, with the 8th, 15th and 23rd day of the calendar perhaps originally having been dedicated to Apam Napat, Haoma, and Dahmān Afrīn. The dedication to the Ahuric Apam Napat would almost certainly have been an issue for devotees of Aredvi Sura Anahita, whose shrine cult was enormously popular between the 4th century BCE and the 3rd century CE and who is (accretions included) a functional equal of Apam Napat. To this day these three divinities are considered 'extra-calendary' divinities inasfar as they are invoked together with the other 27, so making a list of 30 discrete entities.

Faravahar, believed to be a depiction of a Fravashi (guardian spirit), to which the month and day of Farvardin is dedicated

The 2nd through 7th days are dedicated to the Amesha Spentas, the six 'divine sparks' through whom all subsequent creation was accomplished, and who – in present-day Zoroastrianism - are the archangels.

Days 9 through 13 are dedications to five yazatas of the litanies (Niyayeshes): Fire (Atar), Water (Apo), Sun (Hvar), Moon (Mah), the star Sirius (Tištrya) that here perhaps represents the firmament in its entirety. Day 14 is dedicated to the soul of the Ox (Geush Urvan), linked with and representing all animal creation.

Day 16, leading the second half of the days of the month, is dedicated to the divinity of oath, Mithra (like Apam Napat of the Ahuric triad). He is followed by those closest to him, Sraoša and Rašnu, likewise judges of the soul; the representatives of which, the Fravashi(s), come next. Verethragna, Rāman, Vāta are respectively the hypostases of victory, the breath of life, and the (other) divinity of the wind and 'space'.

The last group represent the more 'abstract' emanations: Religion (Daena), Recompense (Ashi), and Justice (Arshtat); Sky (Asman) and Earth (Zam); Sacred Invocation (Manthra Spenta) and Endless Light (Anaghra Raocha).

In present-day use, the day and month names are the Middle Persian equivalents of the divine names or the concepts, but in some cases reflect Semitic influences (for instance Tištrya appears as Tir, which Boyce (1982:31–33) asserts is derived from Nabu-*Tiri). The names of the 8th, 15th, and 23rd day of the month – reflecting Babylonian practice of dividing the month into four periods – can today be distinguished from one another: These three days are named Dae-pa Adar, Dae-pa Mehr, and Dae-pa Din, Middle Persian expressions meaning 'Creator of' (respectively) Atar, Mithra, and Daena.

What might loosely be called weeks are the divisions of days 1–7, 8–14, 15–22, and 23–30 of each month – two weeks of seven days followed by two weeks of eight. The Gatha days at the end of the year do not belong to any such week.

=== Month names ===
Twelve divinities to whom days of the month are dedicated also have months dedicated to them. The month dedicated to Ahura Mazda is a special case – that month is named after Mazda's stock epithet, "Creator" (Avestan Dadvah, whence Zoroastrian Middle Persian Dae), rather than after His proper name.

Seven of the twelve month-names occur at various points in the surviving Avesta texts, but an enumeration similar to the ones for day names does not exist in scripture. Lists of month names are however known from commentaries on the Avesta texts, from various regional Zoroastrian calendars of the 3rd to 7th centuries, and from living usage. That these names have an Old Iranian origin and are not merely Middle Iranian innovations may be inferred from the fact that several regional variants reflect Old Iranian genitive singular forms, that is, they preserve an implicit "(month) of".

The month-names (with Avestan language names in parentheses), in the ordinal sequence used today, are:

1. Farvardin (Frauuašinąm); 2. Ardibehesht (Ašahe Vahištahe); 3. Khordad (Haurvatātō); 4. Tir (Tištryehe); 5. Amardad (Amərətātō); 6. Shehrevar (Xšaθrahe Vairyehe)	7. Mehr (Miθrahe); 8. Aban (Apąm); 9. Azar (Āθrō); 10. Dae (Daθušō [Ahurahe Mazdå]); 11. Bahman (Vaŋhə̄uš Manaŋhō); 12. Asfand or Asfandiar (̊Ārmatōiš)

The days on which day-name and month-name dedications intersect are festival days (name-day feast days) of special worship. Because Ahura Mazda has four day-name dedications, the month dedicated to Him has four intersections (the first, eighth, fifteenth and twenty-third day of the tenth month). The others have one intersection each, for example, the nineteenth day of the first month is the day of special worship of the Fravashis.

There is some evidence that suggests that in ancient practice Dae was the first month of the year, and Frawardin the last. In a 9th century text, Zoroaster's age at the time of his death is stated to have been 77 years and 40 days (Zadspram 23.9), but the "40 days" do not correspond to the difference between the traditional "death day" (11th of Dae) and "birthday" (6th of Frawardin) unless Dae had once been the first month of the year and Frawardin the last. The festival of Frawardigan is held on the last days of the year, instead of following the name-day feast of the Fravashis (nineteenth day of the month of Frawardin, and also called Frawardigan)..

== See also ==
- Armenian calendar
- Iranian calendar
- Zoroastrian festivals in India
- Zoroastrianism
- Nauruz
- Bahá'í calendar
