= House of Goudarz =

Mythical family of ancient Persia

Shahnameh Family
- Lastname: Goudarzian
- Position: Iranians in the Shahnameh
- Member: Tribes Union
- Leadername: Goudarz
- Territory Scope: Isfahan in the Shahnameh

Other Information
- Well known: Most fatalities of the family of 70 people in the war on Pashang

Family members
- Lineage: Kashvad
- Nationality: Iranians

House of Goudarz (Persian: خاندان گودرز) or Goudarzian (گودرزیان) is an important Iranian family in Shahnameh and Persian mythology. They are descendants of Kave the Blacksmith. Gooderzian is also sometimes known as free man, meaning he does not want to be defeated or captured.

== The Role of the Goudarz Family ==
The House of Goudarz plays an important role in many parts of Shahnameh. They have a lot of power before Kay Kavus. Their power and influence decrease when Kay Kavus ascent to throne, in favor of House of Nowzar. Before Kay Kavus, they were spahbeds of Iranian army and also, they were standard-bearer of Iran in wars, but after him, these responsibilities were passed to the House of Nowzar. At the time of Kay Khosrow, their power increased once again. According to Toqyan-e Sakayi, Afghanestanian writer, there is a power struggle between the House of Goudarz and the House of Nowzar in Shahnameh. Rostam and Siavash favored the House of Goudarz and Kay Kavus and Fariburz favored the House of Nowzar. Goudarz, the leading member of the family played a vital role in the story of Davazdah Rokh war. His son, Giv and his grandson, Bizhan also have important roles in the story of Kay Khosrow and the story of Bizhan and Manizhe respectively.

They are relatives of the House of Rostam. Rostam, the most important Iranian hero in Shahnameh, has married with the daughter of Goudarz. Giv, an important member of the House of Goudarz, also has married Rostam's daughter, Banu Goshasp.

== Family tree ==
Kave the Blacksmith
Kashvad
Goudarz
Giv	Roham	Bahram	Hojir
Bizhan	Farhad

== Sources ==
- Ferdowsi Shahnameh. From the Moscow version. Mohammed Publishing. ISBN 964-5566-35-5
- Toqyan-e Sakayi, Mohammad Younes (2010). Khānvādahʹhā-yi Gūdarz va Pīrān dar Shāhnāmah. Tehran: Intishārāt-i Bayn al-Milalī al-Hudá. ISBN 9789644394287.
