= House of Nowzar =

Iranian clan in Shahnameh and Persian mythology

Shahnameh Family
- Lastname: Nowzaran
- Position: Iranians in the Shahnameh
- Member: Tribes Union
- Leadername: Nowzar
- Territory Scope: Unspecified, perhaps Elam after extinction

Other Information
- Well known: The first dynasty in Iran, after dividing the country into three parts, by Fereydun.
- Historical similarity: Cimmerians
- Religion: Zoroastrianism

Family members
- Lineage: Nowzar
- Nationality: Iran

House of Nowzar (Persian: خاندان نوذر) also known as Nowzarian (نوذریان) is an important Iranian clan in Shahnameh and Persian mythology. Nowzar ruled Iran for seven years. After his death, the grandees of Iran didn't recognize his sons Tous and Gostaham as the shahanshah of Iran and instead they gave the throne to Kayanian dynasty.

== The Nowzaran family ==
The House of Nowzar and the House of Goudarz were in power struggle with each other. Before Kay Kavus, House of Goudarz had many power and influence. But at his time, House of Nowzar achieved more power. Before Kay Kavus, members of House of Goudarz were spahbeds of Iranian army and also, they were standard-bearer of Iran in wars, but after him, these responsibilities were passed to the House of Nowzar. At the time of Kay Khosrow, House of Goudarz regained their power. According to Toqyan-e Sakayi, Afghanestanian writer, Rostam and Siavash favored the House of Goudarz and Kay Kavus and Fariburz favored the House of Nowzar.

== Sources ==
- Ferdowsi Shahnameh. From the Moscow version. Mohammed Publishing. ISBN 964-5566-35-5
- Toqyan-e Sakayi, Mohammad Younes (2010). Khānvādahʹhā-yi Gūdarz va Pīrān dar Shāhnāmah. Tehran: Intishārāt-i Bayn al-Milalī al-Hudá. ISBN 9789644394287.
