= Tageuo (Shahnameh) =

Character in the Shahnameh

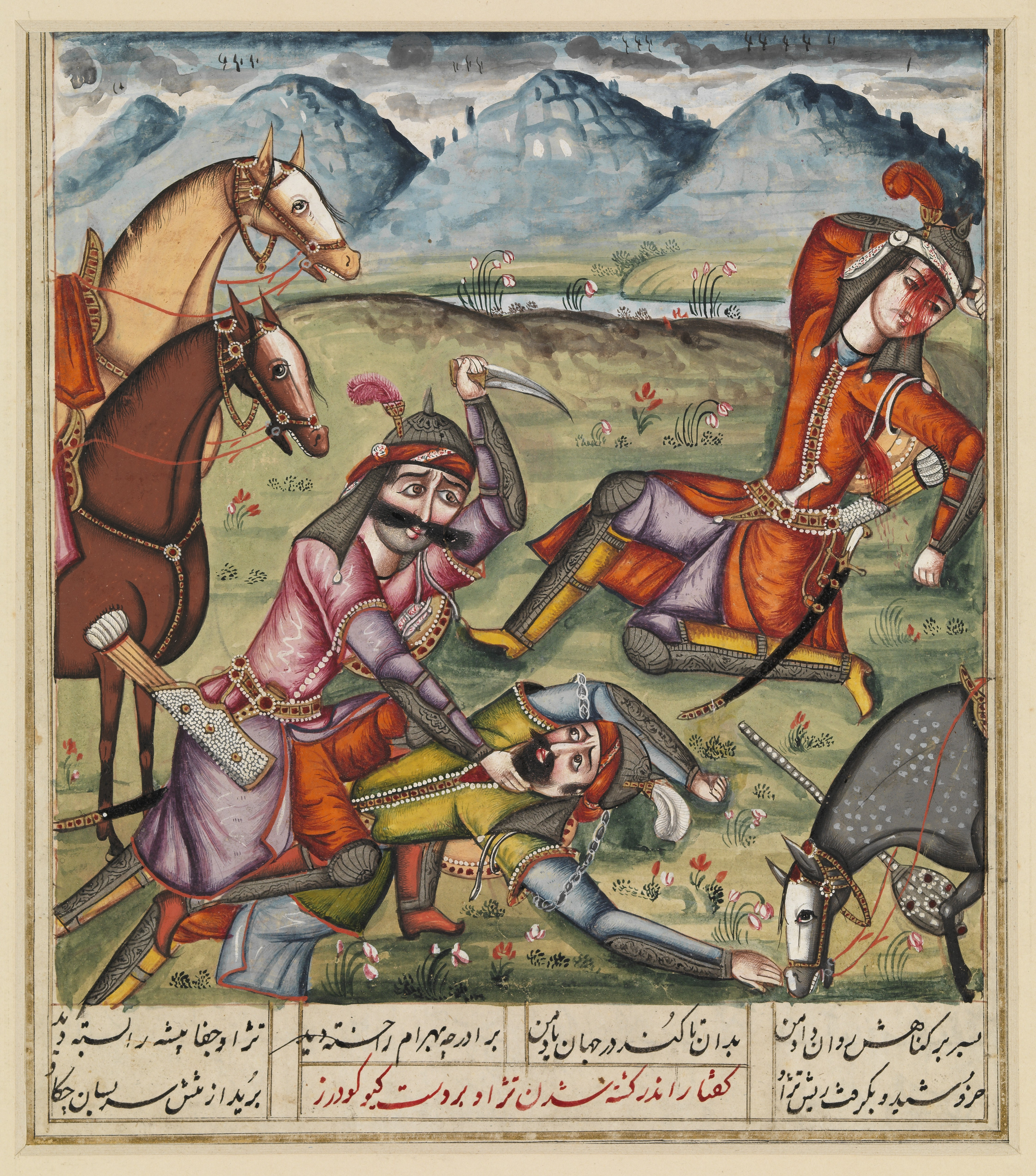
- Giv kills Tageuo in revenge for the death of Bahram.

Shahnameh Men
- Name: Tageuo
- Nickname: Turanian gladiator
- Post: Border guard
- Responsibility: Castle and herd protector
- Family: House of Viseh

Other Information
- Border guard: Garugard Castel
- Nationality: Turkan

Family members
- Spouse: Espanoi
- Father-in-law: Afrasiab

In the epic poem Shahnameh, Tageuo (Persian: تژاو) is one of the Turan heroes in charge of a border state between Iran and Turan. His state was the third province attacked by Iranians under the command of Tous after Chaeam and Kasa-Roud.

== Iranian war ==
Tous led the Iranians in overcoming two major obstacles. They passed through the snow and cold of the mountains and then burned firewood to enter Turan. This was the start of the Iranian invasion of Turan. Due to their own negligence, the Iranians faced difficulties in campaigning and suffered a severe defeat. However, after getting rid of the snow and cold, the re-organized Tous Army continued to advance. First, they arrived at Garugard, where Tageuo ruled. Tageuo sent the shepherd Kaboodeh to estimate the number of invaders, but he was captured by the Iranians and killed. The next day, Tageuo gathered his men and confronted the Iranians. However, his forces were too few in number to defeat the Iranians, so they ultimately failed. Tageuo fled to the fort alone.

Bizhan chased Tageuo, but when Tageuo entered the castle, he saw his wife Espanoi, who was aware of the severe defeat. Both fled on horseback, but the horse soon ran out of breath. Tageuo was forced to leave his wife alone and went to Turan near Afrasiab. Bizhan found Espanoi on the chase and brought him to the Iranian camp, but Tageuo arrived in Turan and reported what had happened. The easy victory made the Iranian army happy and overconfident. Afrasiab ordered Piran to launch a surprise attack. According to Shahnameh texts and images, the Iranians were severely defeated in the attack. More than two-thirds of the fighters were killed and many were injured.

== Name ==
Tageuo is not from Iran or Turan kings, but he is the son-in-law of King Turan. The root of his name means "crown," that is, one who deserves the Crown Holder. Before the war, Tageuo tells Giv, "This crown was laid on me by Afrasiab."

== Gallery ==
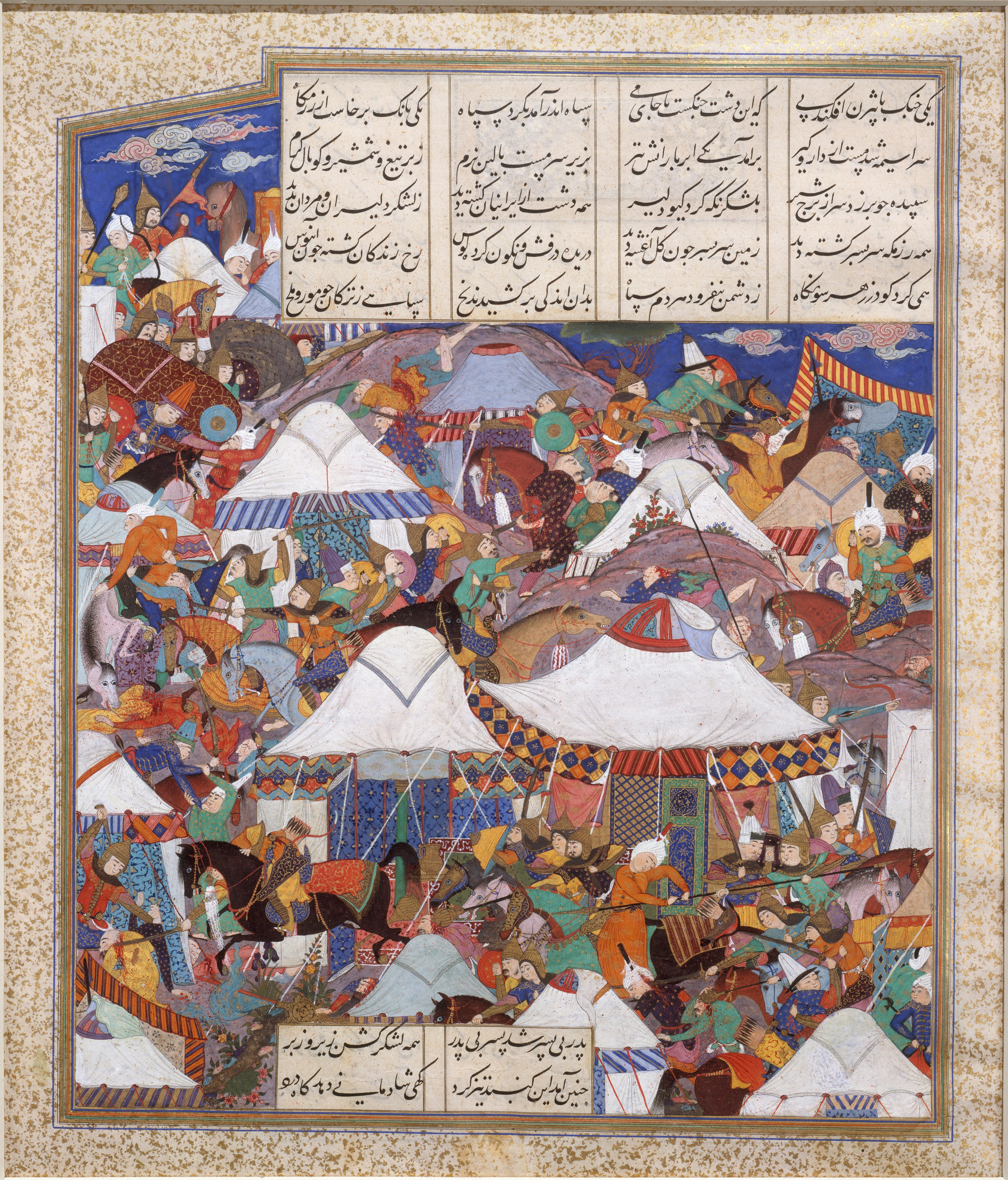
The besotted Iranian camp attacked by night

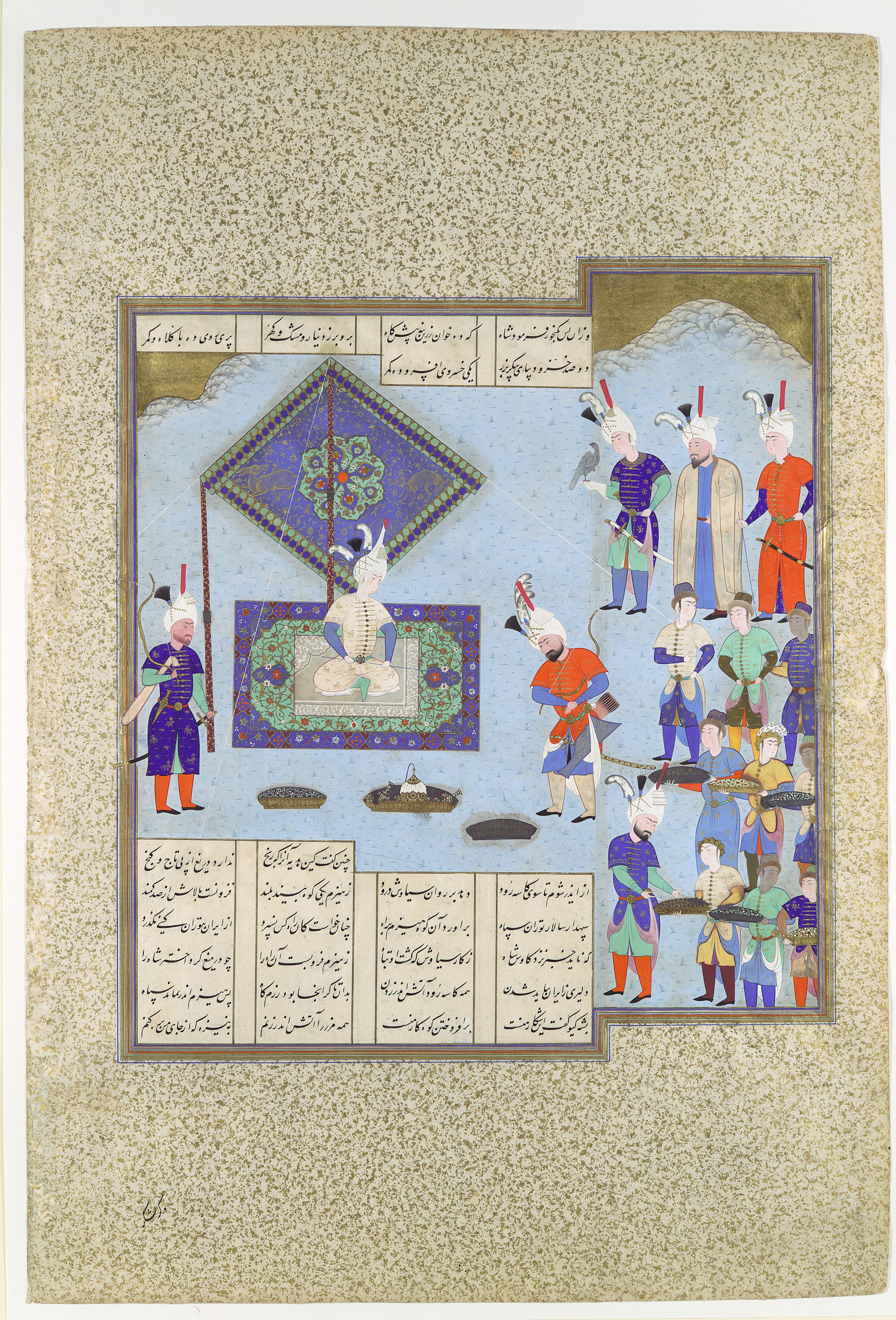
The rewards set for this sequence of attacks, by Kay Khosrow

== Sources ==
- Ferdowsi Shahnameh. From the Moscow version. Mohammed Publishing. ISBN 964-5566-35-5
