= Gorgin (Shahnameh) =

Persian mythological hero of the epic poem Shahnameh

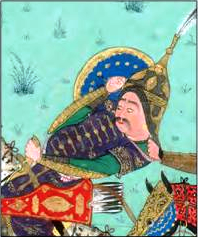
- Gorgin in the Shahnameh of Shah Tahmasp

Shahnameh Men
- Name: Gorgin
- Nickname: Gorgin Milad; Iranian gladiator

Other Information
- Well known: Caught in Sohrab hand
- Attendance at: Bijan and Manijeh
- Wars: Davazdah Rokh War; Great Kay Khosrow War
- killer: Andariman
- Book About Him: Faramarz Nama; Bahman Nameh

Family members
- Father: Milad
- Nationality: Iran

Gorgin (Persian: گُرگین) is an Iranian hero in Shahnameh, during the reigns of Kay Kavus and Kay Khosrow. He is son of Milad. According to Tabari, the name of Milad's father is also Gorgin, which is possible because in ancient Iran, it was a usual practice to name the first grandson after the grandfather. Beside Shahnameh, Gorgin also appears in other Iranian epics such as Faramarz Nama and Bahman Nama.

== In the Shahnameh ==
Gorgin is one of the most famous Iranian heroes of the Kay Kāvus era in . His most important role is in the story of Bizhan and Manizhe. He and Bijan travel to the Turan border in order to kill the boars that were in the land of Armenia Roaming. Gorgin becomes envious of Bizhan's bravery and seduces him to go to Turan. There, Bizhan finds Manizhe and they fell in love. But Afrasiyab arrests Bizhan and throw him into a dungeon. Gorgin returns to Iran and tells Kay Khosrow that Bizhan was lost while hunting an onager. But Kay Khosrow does not believe him. Gorgin is first arrested, but later he was released after Rostam's intervention. He and Rostam then go to Turan in order to free Bizhan and bring him back to Iran.

== Gallery ==
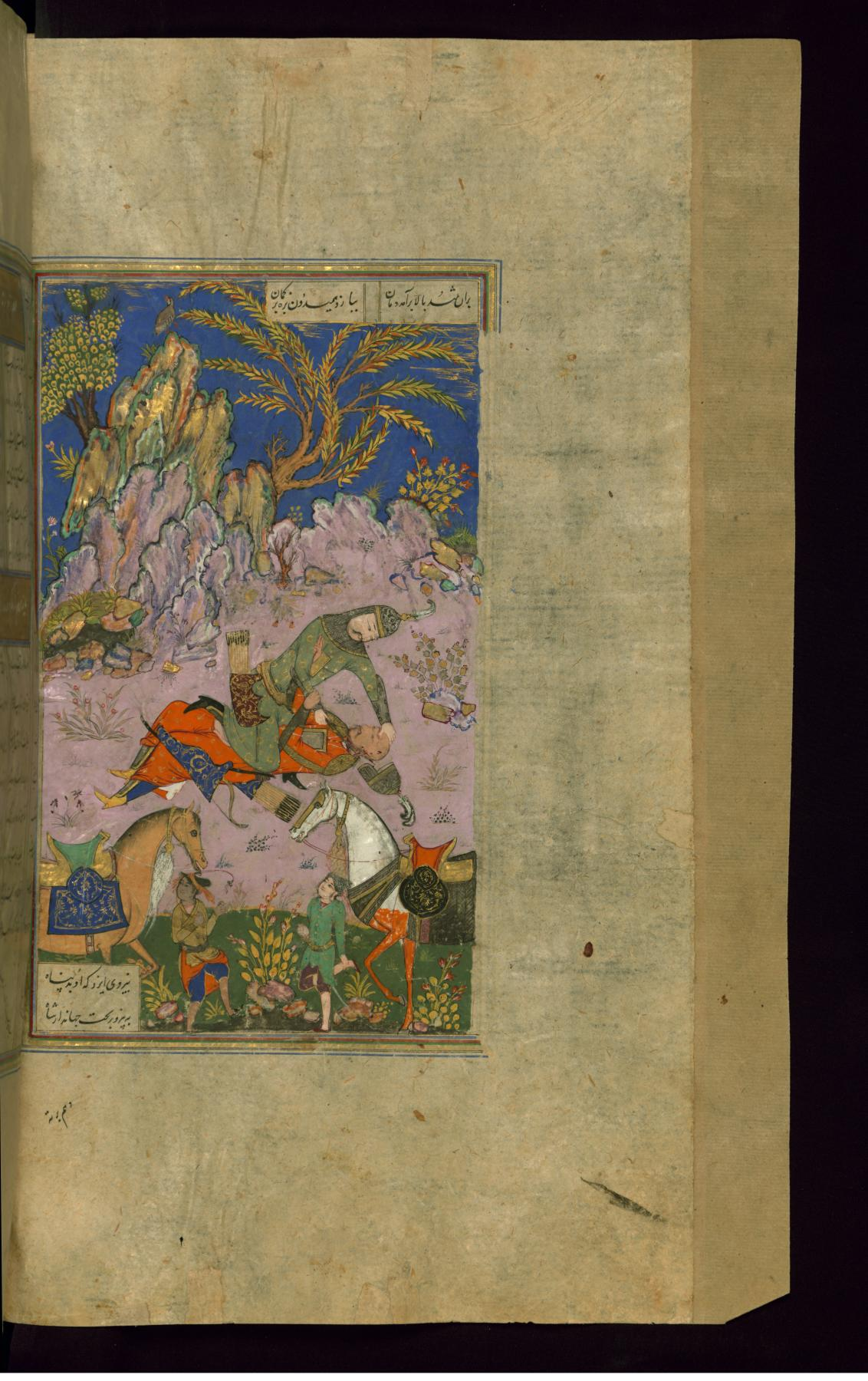
Gurgin Cuts Off the Head of Andariman

== Sources ==
- Ferdowsi Shahnameh. From the Moscow version. Mohammed Publishing. ISBN 964-5566-35-5
