= Hojir =

Iranian hero in Shahnameh

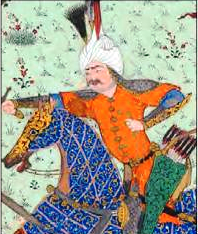
- Hojir in the Shahnameh of Shah Tahmasp

Shahnameh Men
- Name: Hojir
- Nickname: Iranian gladiator

Other Information
- Well known: Caught in Sohrab hand
- Wars: Davazdah Rokh War
- killer: Sepahram

Family members
- Father: Goudarz
- Brothers: Giv, Rohham, Bahram
- Ancestor: Kashvad
- Lineage: House of Goudarz

Hojir (Persian: هُژیر) is an Iranian hero in Shahnameh, the national epic of Iran. Hojir is son of Goudarz and brother of Giv and Rohham. Hojir first appears in the story of Rostam and Sohrab.

== Hojir in the Shahnameh ==
He is castellan of Dez-e Sepid (White fortress) in the border of Iran and Turan. When Sohrab arrives at Dez-e Sepid, Hojir came out to fight him, but he was defeated by Sohrab, however Sohrab does not kill Hojir and instead takes him as a prisoner. Sohrab, wishing to recognize Rostam, his father, asks Hojir to introduce leaders of Iranian army to him, but when he asks about Rostam, Hojir does not reveal Rustam's identity, fearing that Sohrab may kill Rostam.

The castellan of Dez-e Sepid is not to be confused with Hojir the messenger. This later Hojir participated in a series of battles between Iran and Turan, with his most important role in the story of Davazdah Rokh (Twelve combats), where he kills Sepahram, a Turanian hero in a pitched battle.

== Other resources ==
Beside Shahnameh, Hojir was also mentioned in other sources such as Momjalal-tawāriḵ, where he is the chief companion of Kay Khosrow.

His name is derived from Old Iranian *Hu-čiθra and it means "of good nature" or literally of good appearance. In Middle Persian texts, his name was mentioned as hu-čihr and then it developed into New Persian Hožir/Hojir, meaning "beautiful, fair". َIts cognate in Modern Persian is Hu-čehr (هوچهر) or beh-čehr (بهچهر). It sometimes incorrectly pronounced as "Hajir".

== Family tree ==
Kashvad
Goudarz
Giv	Roham	Bahram	Hojir
Bizhan	Farhad

== Sources ==
- Ferdowsi Shahnameh. From the Moscow version. Mohammed Publishing. ISBN 964-5566-35-5
