= Gostaham =

Hero name in Shahnameh epic poem

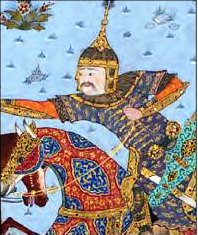
In the Shahnameh of Shah Tahmasp.

Gostaham (Persian: گُسْتَهَم) is the name of a number of Iranian heroes in Shahnameh.

== Son of Nowzar ==
The first Gostaham is the son of Nowzar and the younger brother of Tous. His name was first mentioned in the reign of his father. He was installed as a local ruler in Turan by Kay Khosrow. He is among the heroes who disappeared (or died) in snow during Kay Khosrow's ascent to heaven. Beside Gostaham, four other Iranian heroes also disappeared in this accident. There's a mountain pass named Molla-ye Bižan in the Kohgiluya district where as believed by locals, is where the heroes disappeared. He was also mentioned in other sources. The unknown author of Mojmal al-tawārikò wrote what he was called "rāst-andāz" (sharpshooter) and "saḵt-kamān varāz" (sharp-shooting paladin). According to Iranica, he may be that Vistarav son of Naotara (Nowzar) mentioned in Avesta.

=== Family Tree ===
Manuchehr
Nowzar
Tous	Gostaham

== Son of Gazhdaham ==
The second Gostaham is son of Gazhdaham and brother of Gordafarid during the reign of Kay Khosrow. In Shahnameh, he is a friend of Bizhan. Kay Khosrow does not let him to fight with Turanian heroes in the story of Davazdah Rokh (Twelve combats). Gostaham is angry of this decision and chase Lahhāk and Faršēd, brothers of Piran Viseh and kills them. However he himself was severely injured and Bizhan takes him to Kay Khosrow and the latter saves his life by tying a panacean bead around his arm.

When Afrasiab kills Siyâvash in Turan, Goudarz sends Giv there to bring Kay Khosrow, Siavash's son, back to Iran. Giv finds Kay Khosrow and his mother, Farangis, after several years. When they arrive at Dez-e Sepid in the border of Iran and Turan, according to one tradition, Gostaham son of Gazhdaham is the castellan of the fortress.
