= Davazdah Rokh =

Story in the Shahnameh

Davāzdah Rokh (Persian: دوازده رخ, lit. 'Twelve Combats') is a story in the Shahnameh. This relatively long story (almost 2,500 verses) is described as one of the finest stories of the Shahnameh in terms of "plot, dramatic description, and insight into human nature".

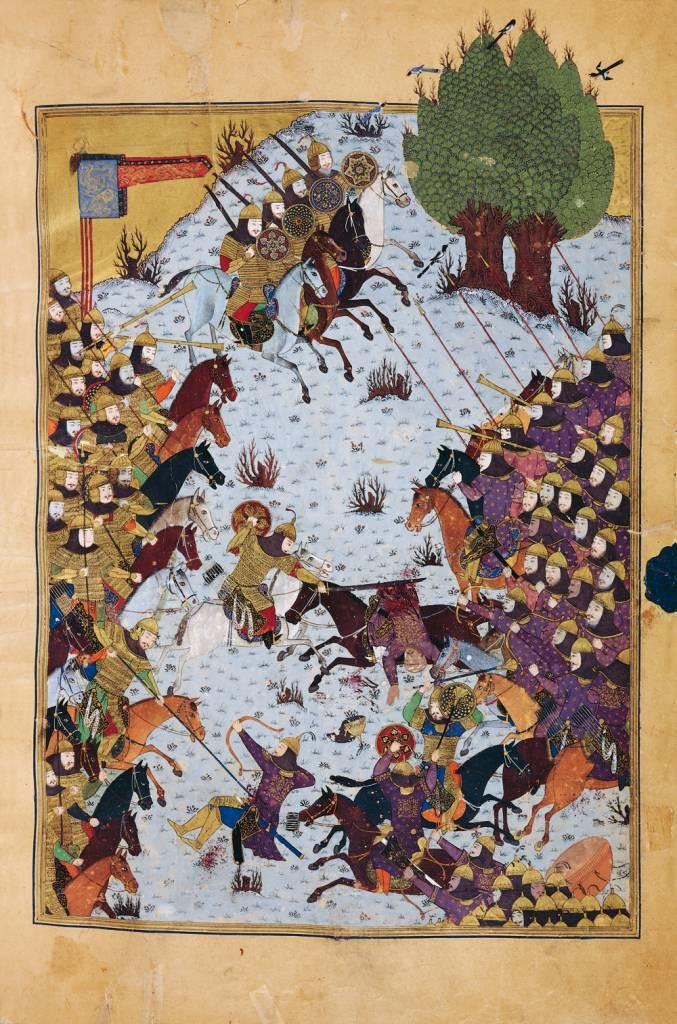
The opposing armies of Iran led by Kay Khosrow, and Turan, under the command of Afrasiab. The Bayasanghori Shâhnâmeh, made in 1430 for Prince Bayasanghor (1399–1433), a registered Heritage of UNESCO.

According to shahnameh It takes place in Zibad or black mountain of Gonabad in Iran state of Greater Khorasan The War of the Twelve Faces, described in the Shahnameh with 2518 verses or 5036 Hemistich and is one of the few mythological stories in the world whose geographical locations are almost certain. Ferdowsi used the name Zibad at least 11 times and the name Gonabad 12 times as the location of this war in geographical area Iran and Turan, In the Hemistich and verses No: 295,310,538,545,1504,1839,2733,3222,4152,4185,503 Zibad had been mentioned : 295 :

- چو گودرز نزدیک زیبَد رسید
- سران را ز لشکر همی برگزید

When Goudarz arrived and settled in zibad he chose the best of the army.

- 545 ز زیبَد همی تاگنابد سپاه
- در و دشت ازیشان کبود و سیاه

from Zibad to the Gonabad was full of army and warriors the land was covered by combatants. ' ... where a number of Iranian heroes fight with a number of Turanian heroes. In all cases, Iranian heroes defeat their Turanian competitors. Goudarz is the chief of Iranian heroes and Piran Viseh is the chief of Turanian heroes. The battle begins when Piran's brother, Houman, challenges the Iranians and is killed by Bizhan in a single combat. The two armies then join battle, without either side prevailing. Finally they agree to abide by the outcomes of a series of single combats (mard o mard) between the greatest heroes of the two armies:

== Heroes of the two armies ==
1. Fariburz vs Golbad Viseh
2. Giv vs Goruye Zereh
3. Gorazeh vs Siamak the Turanian
4. Foruhal vs Zangolah
5. Rohham vs Barman
6. Bizhan vs Rooyin
7. Hojir vs Sepahram
8. Zange-ye Shavaran vs Akhvast
9. Gorgin vs Andariman
10. Bartah vs Kohram
11. Goudarz vs Piran
12. Gostaham vs Lahhak and Farshad

In all battles, the winner is the Iranian hero. At the end, Goudarz kills Piran and the war ends. However, Gostaham, who has not been chosen by Kay Khosrow to fight with Turanians, chases Lahhāk and Faršēd, brothers of Piran, and kills them, although he himself is severely injured in the process, whereupon Bizhan takes him to Kay Khosrow, who saves his life by the expedient of binding a healing amulet to his arm. The war ends with the death of Afrasiab, Turan's king. In some manuscripts of Shahnameh the story is entitled az Yazdah Rokh (Eleven combats), not counting the last fight between Gostaham and Piran's brothers.

The campaign ends with the victory of Iran and the implementation of a festival in honour of the empire's noble ruler Kai Khosrow and Goudarz the valiant commander of his sovereign's army.

== Location of Davazdah Rokh ==
According to shahnameh the place of war was in the area near Zibad Castle or black mountain of Gonabad in Iran state of Greater Khorasan ..

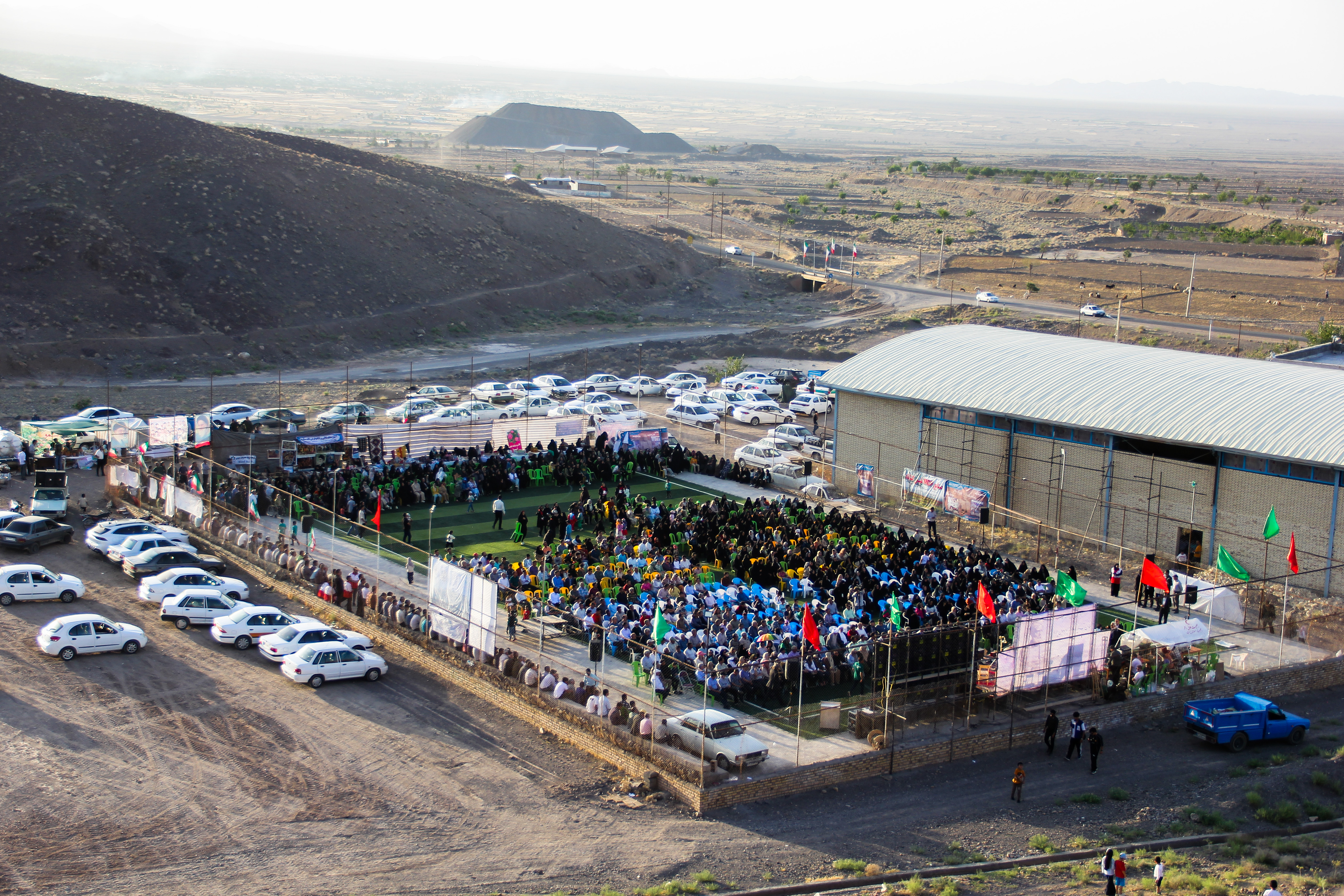
Davazdah Rokh

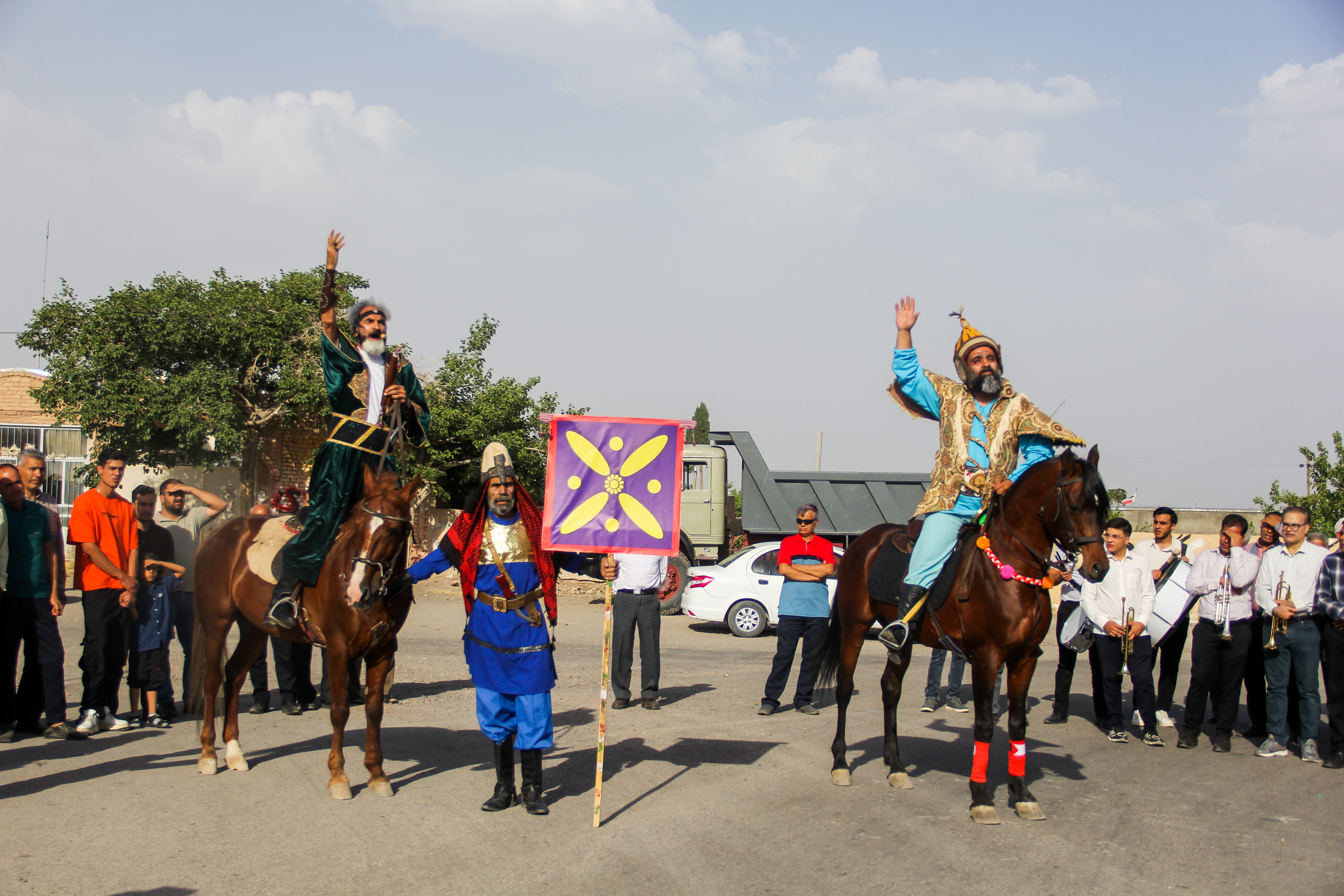
Davazdah Rokh

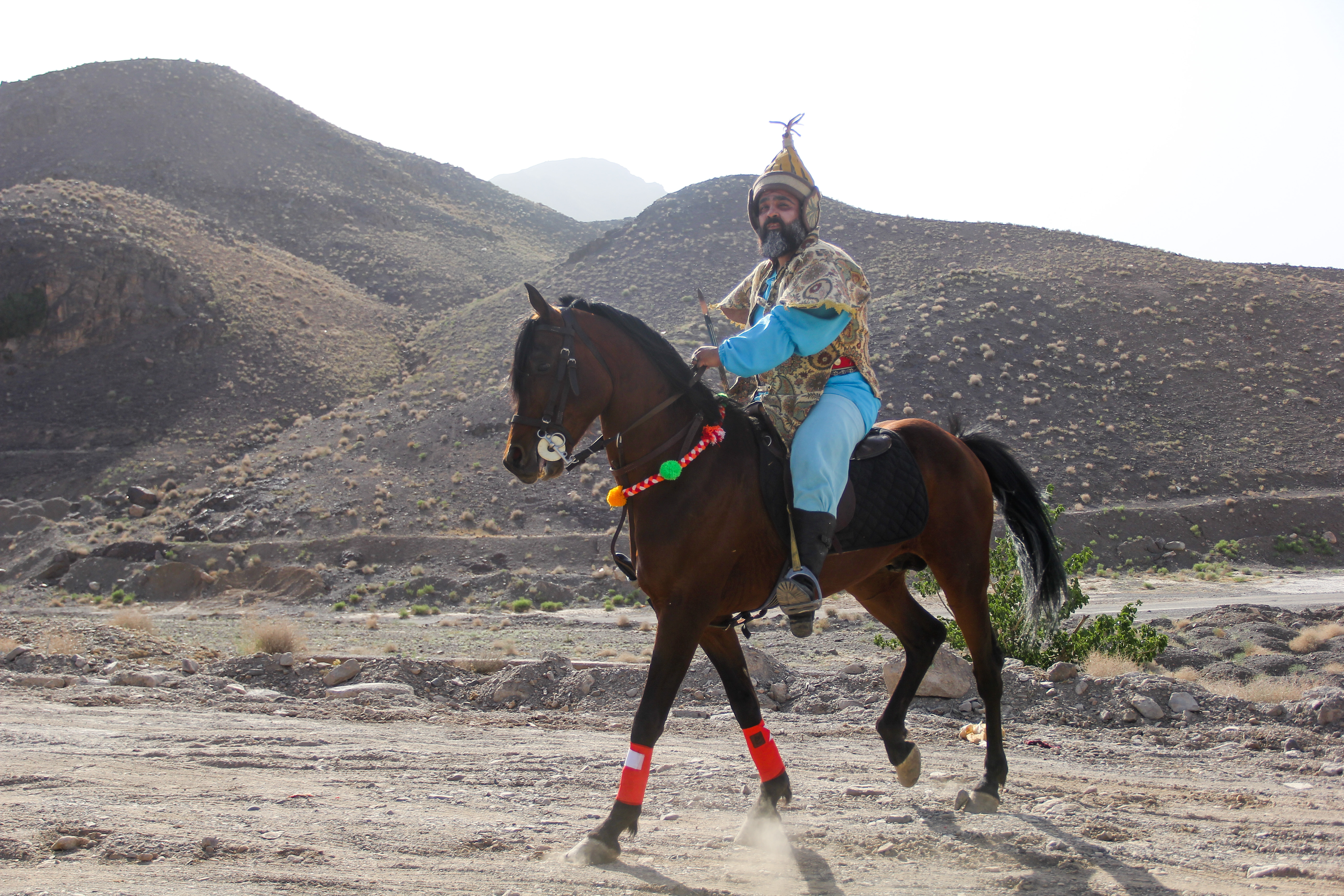
Davazdah Rokh

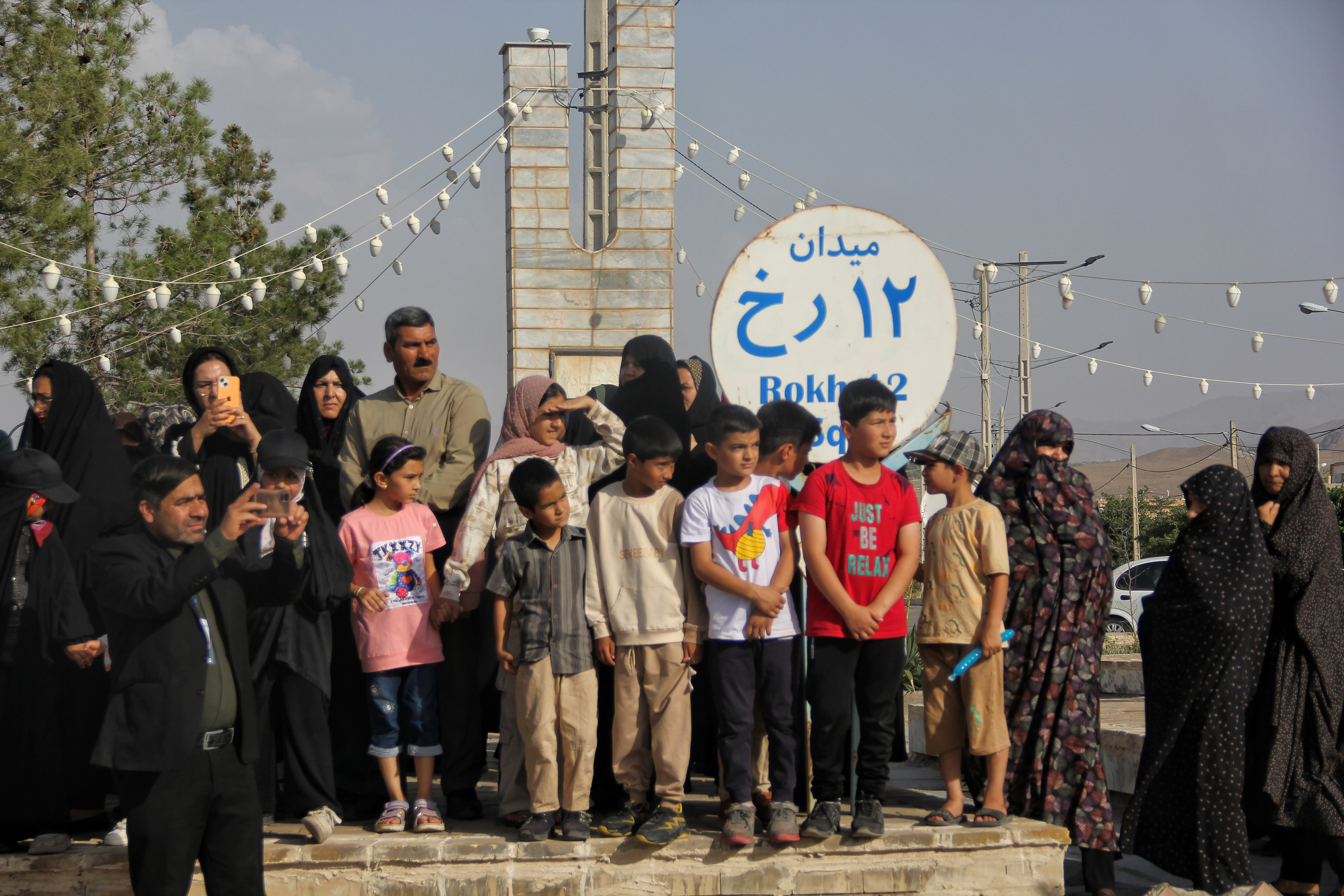
Davazdah Rokh

== Gallery ==
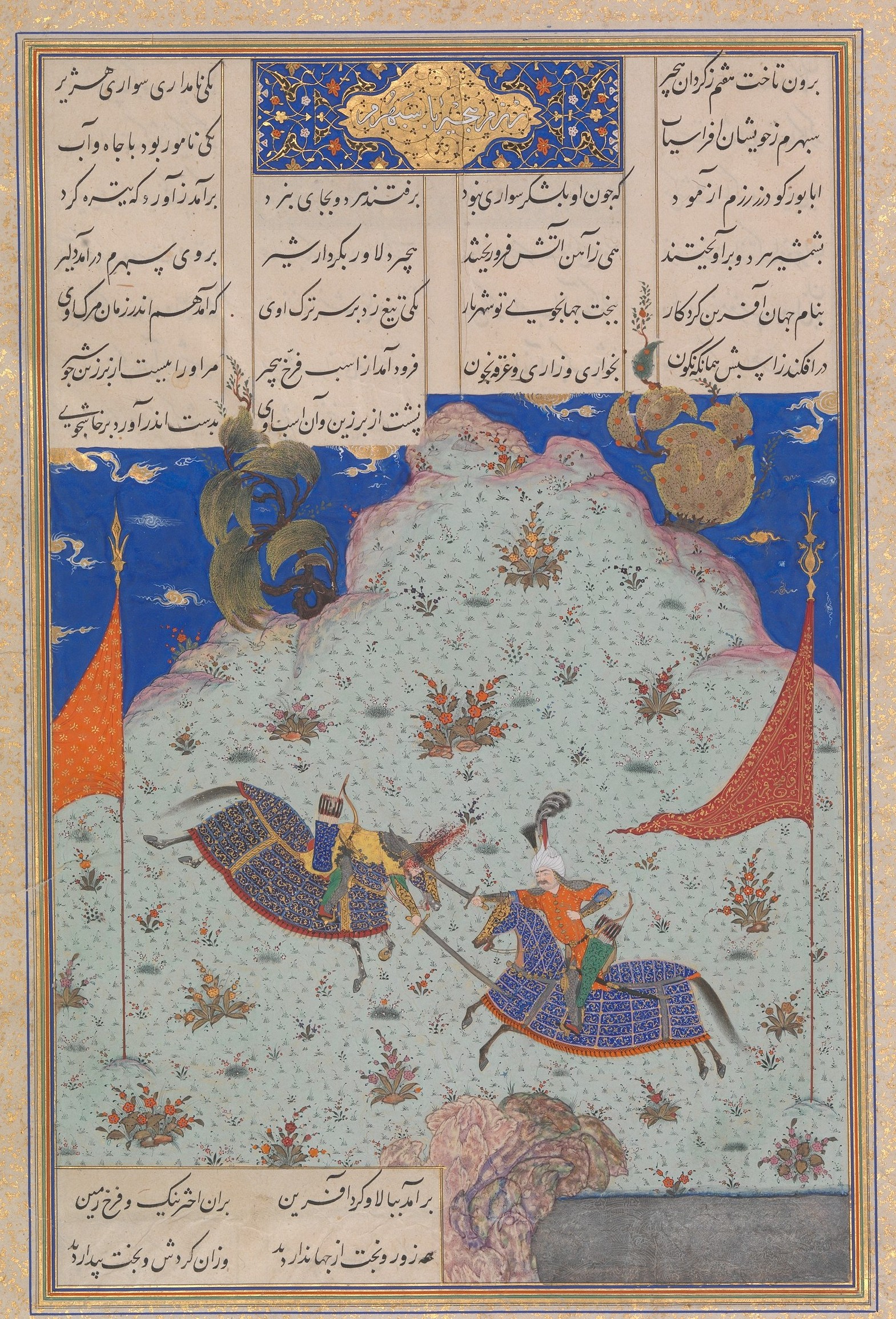
Bizhan Versus Ruyyin

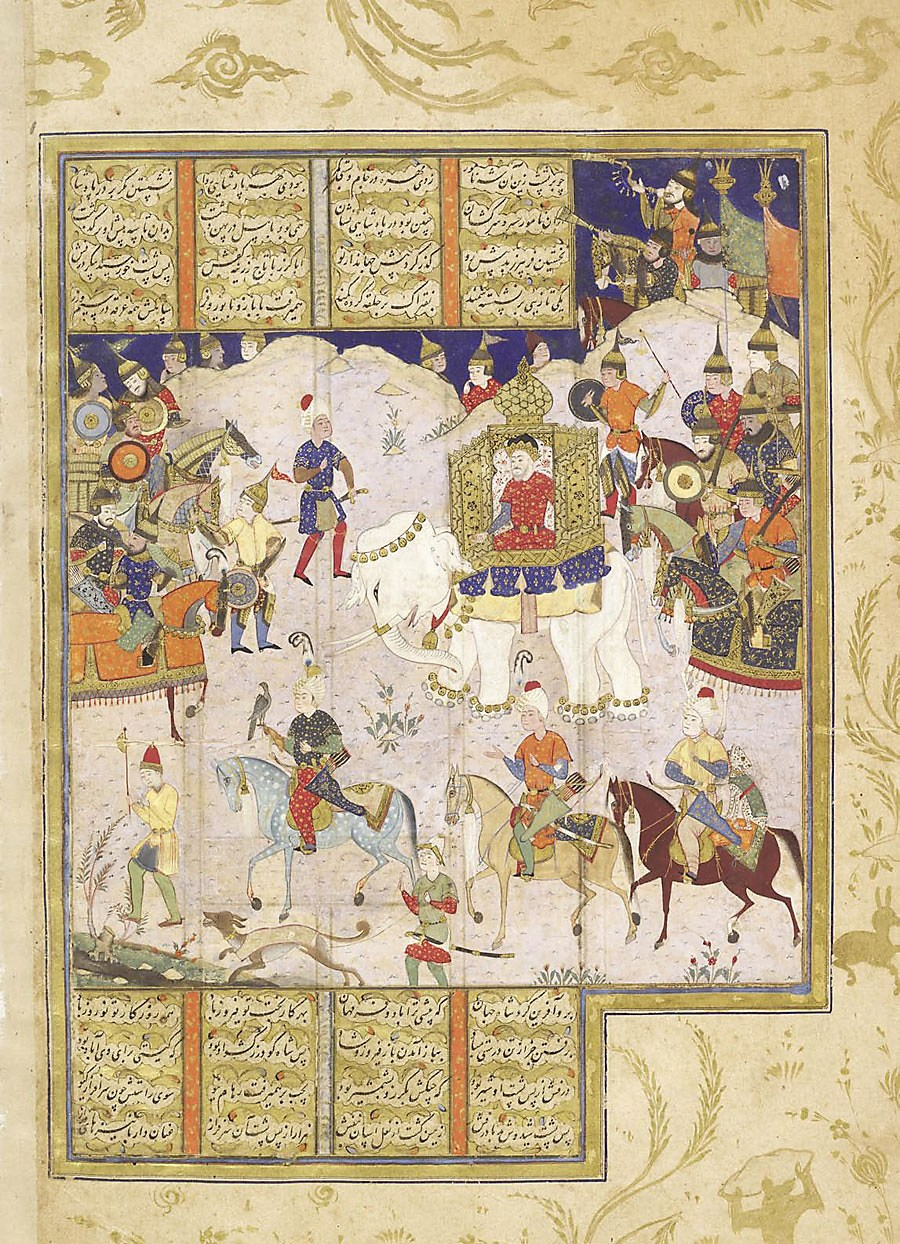
Kay Khosrow Reviews His Army

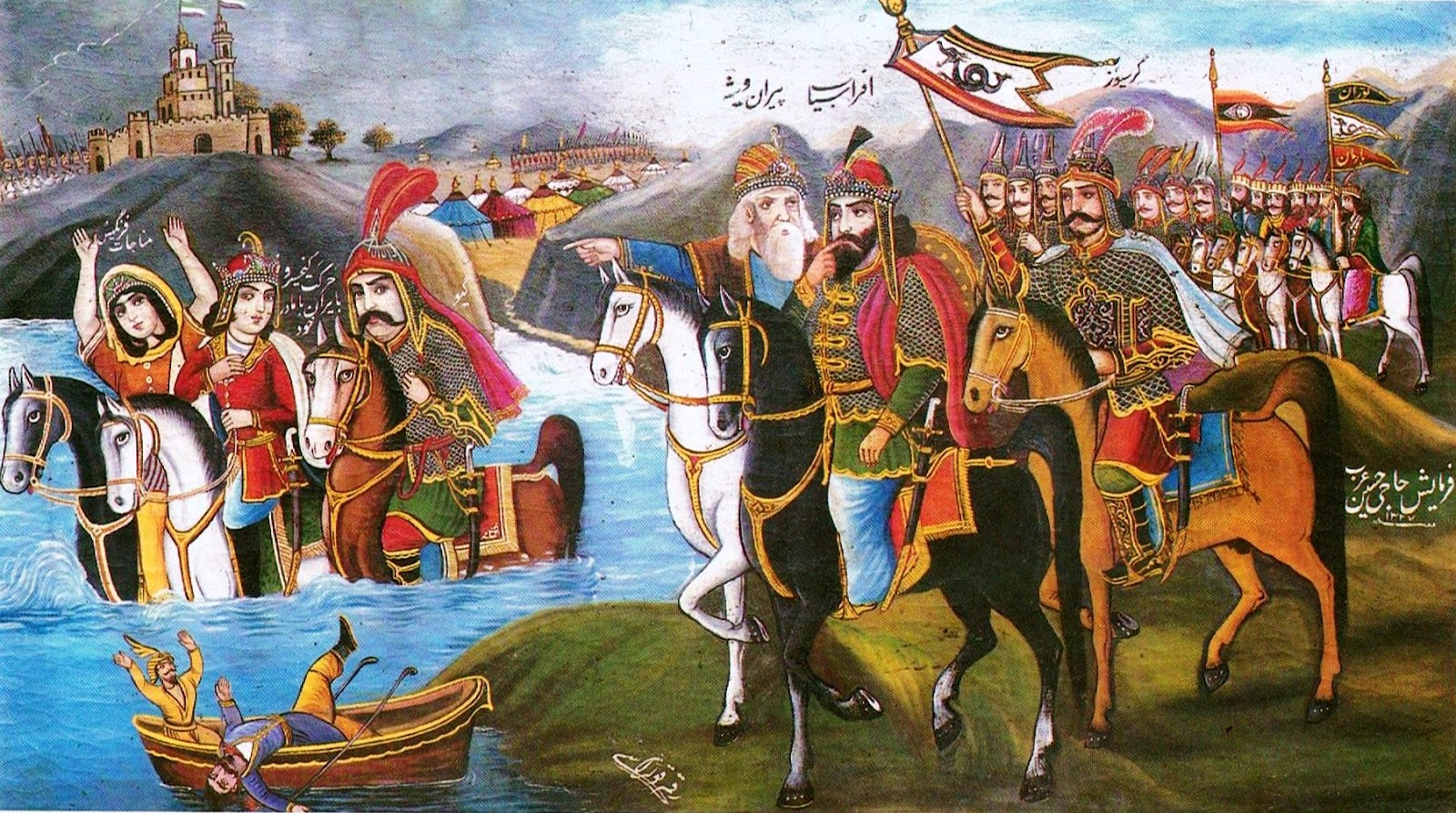
Kay Khosrow arrival in Iran

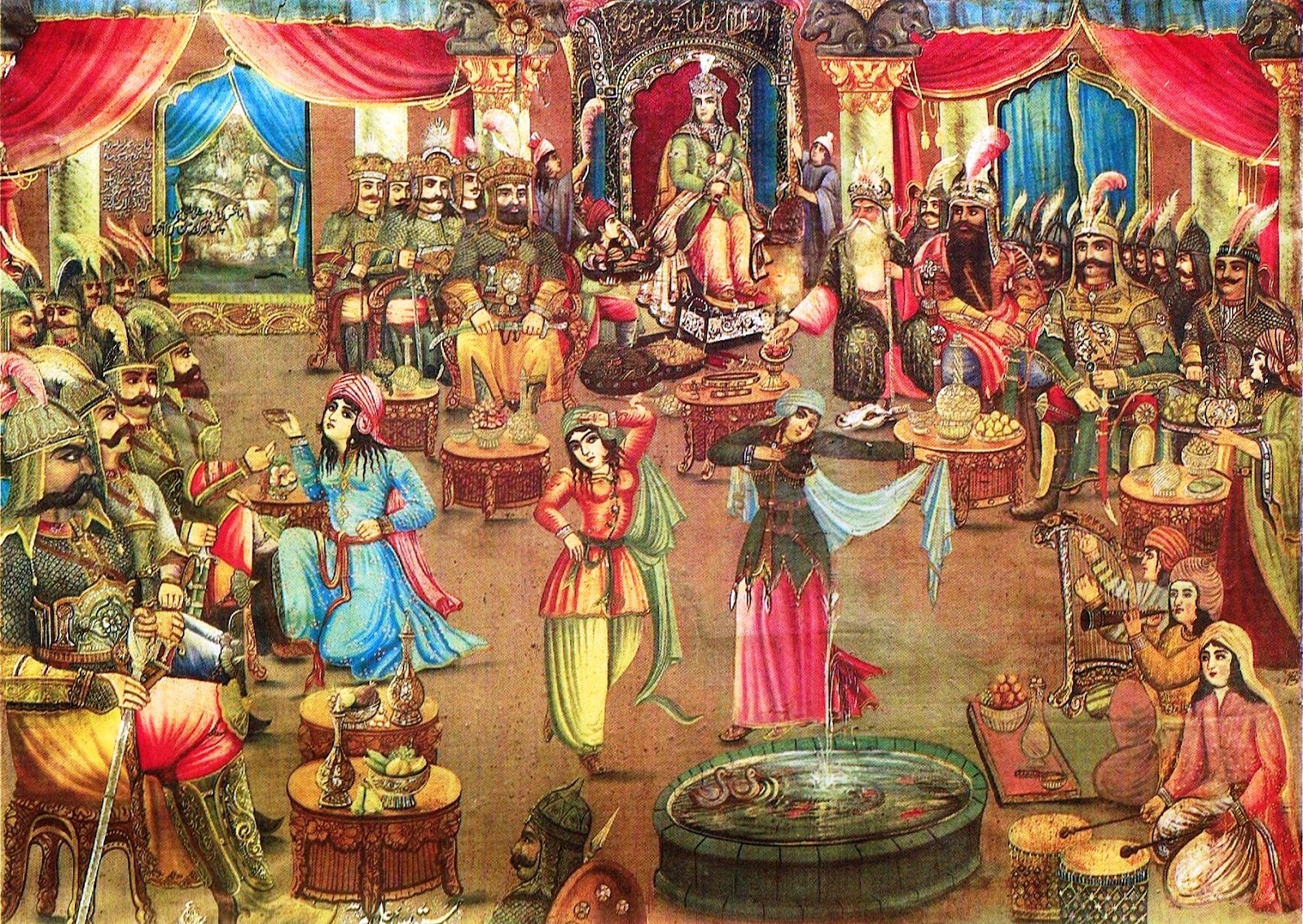
Davazdah Rokh victory

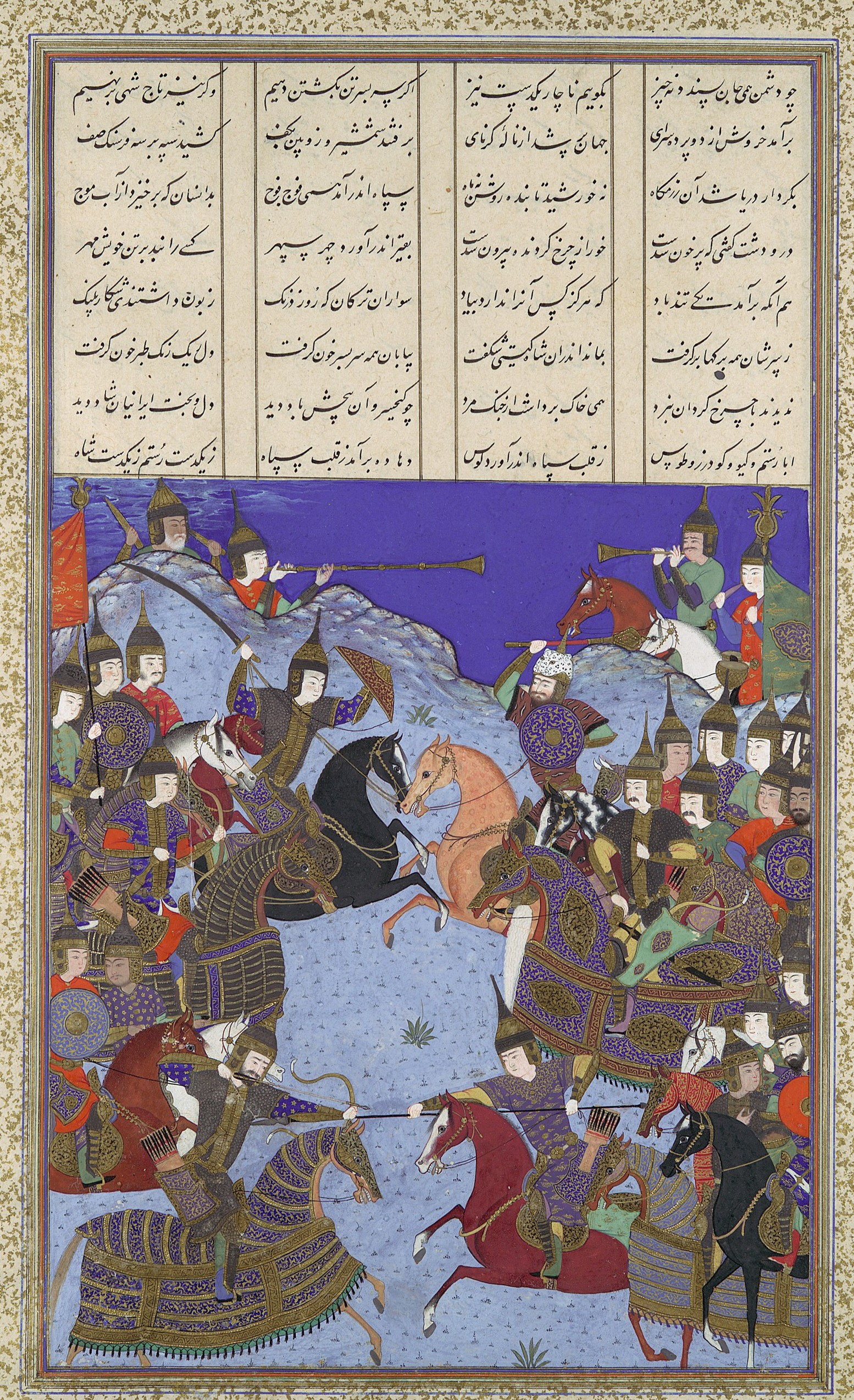
Kay Khosrow and Afrasiyab

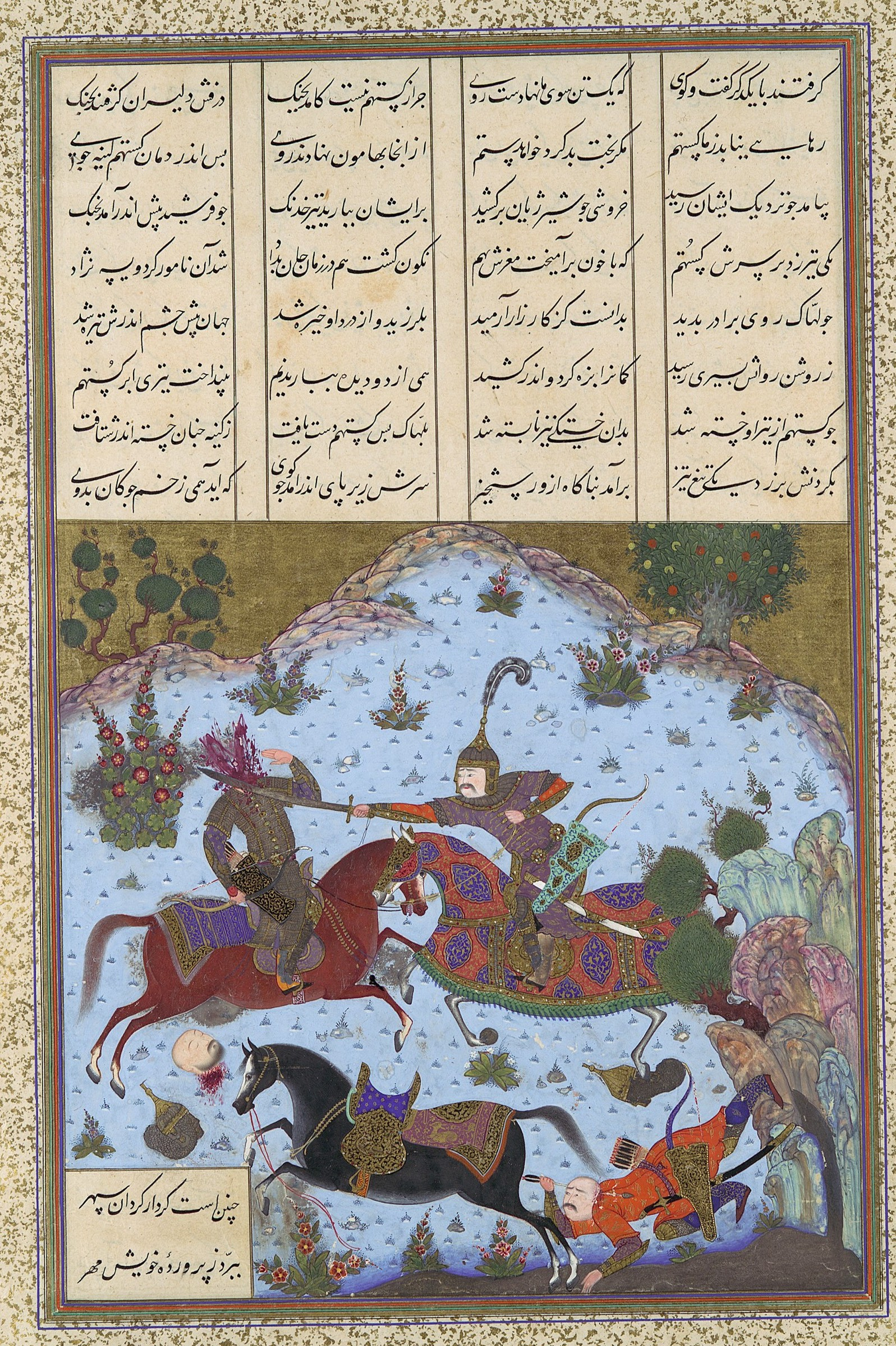
Lahhak and Farshidvard

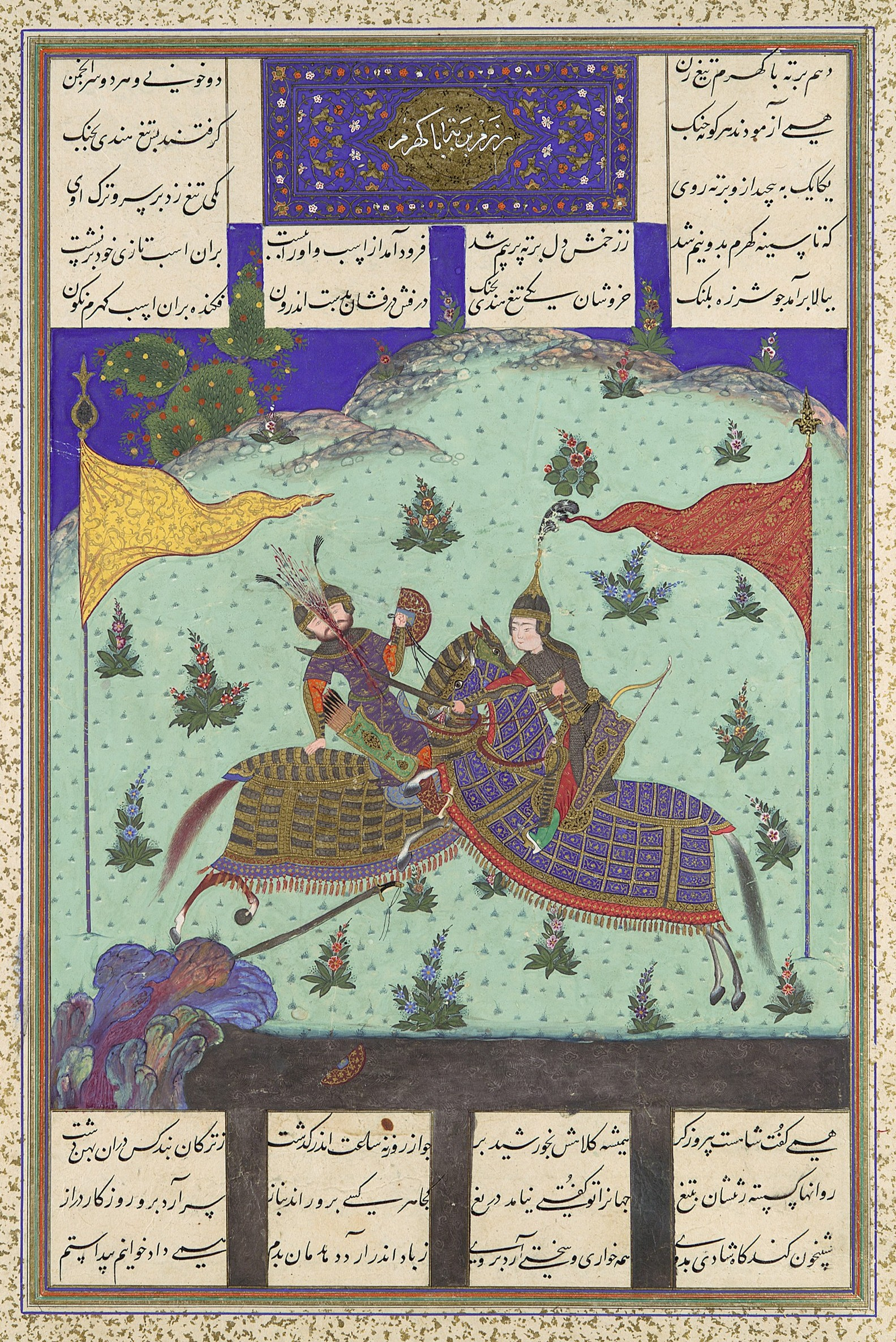
Barta versus Kuhram

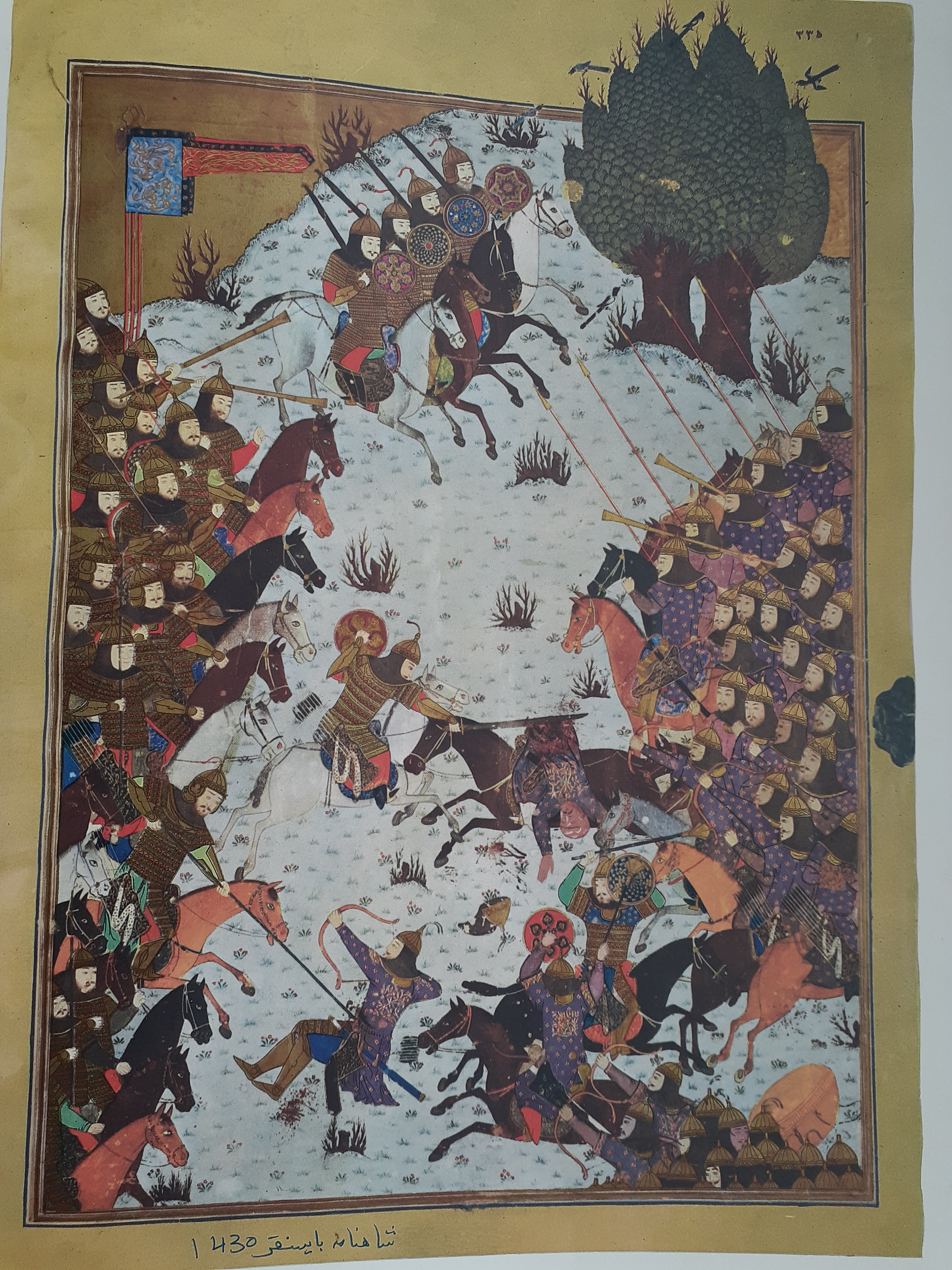
BATTLE OF 12 Rokh)

== See also ==
- Shahnameh of Shah Tahmasp

== Sources ==
Book, geografía of Shahnameh by Dr Sayedi Farkhod, 2021, Iran.

- Ferdowsi university Simorgh Magazine, No 9 August 28, 2018 page 81-89 Location of Davazdah Rokh combats by Dr.Ajam

1. IRNA news agancy
2. IRIB.TV. on the festival of 12 Rokh

1. Second Festival of Davazdah Rokh in zibad
2. Davazdah Rokh
- on line Davazdah Rokh
