= Zangay-i Shavaran =

Zangay
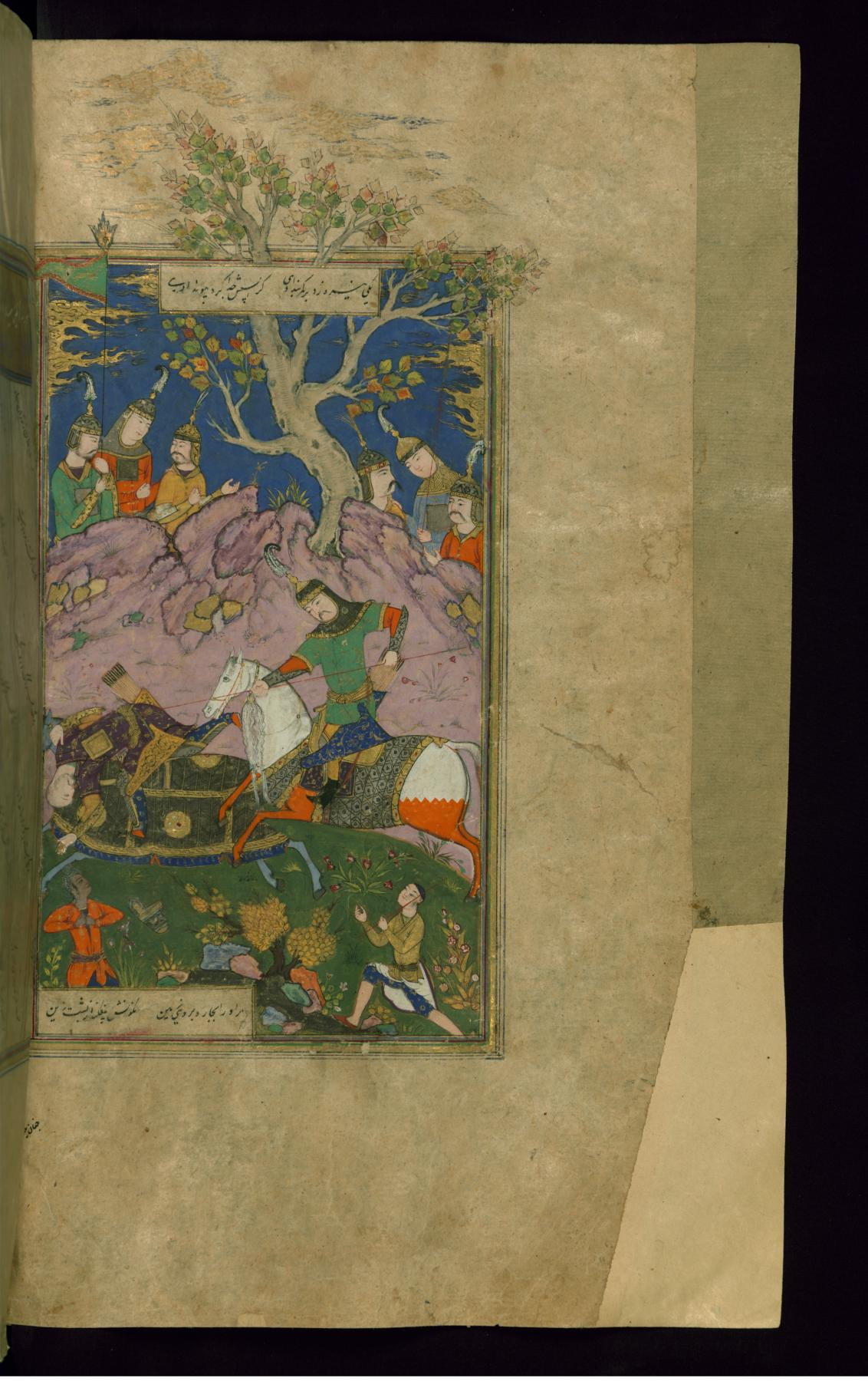
- Zangay is victorious over the enemy

Shahnameh Men
- Name: Zangay
- Nickname: Zangay-i Shavaran
- Post: Gladiator Shahnameh
- Jobs: Border guard

Other Information
- Presences: Iran-Turan war Mazandaran War; Davazdah Rokh

Zangay-i Shavaran (Persian: زنگه‌شاوران) is an Iranian hero at the time of Kay Khosrow. His fame is in relation to Siyavash's wife, Jawira. After Siyâvash death, Iranians did not know about Siyavash family in Turan. Only two Iranians knew of Siavash and Jawira marriage, and Zangay-i Shavaran and Bahram were both.

== The story of Zangeh ==
In Kay Khosrow first attack on Turan, was commander of the Tous Corps, and he moved the Corps out of Farud territory. And Farud was the Keikhosro vector but the governor of Afrasiab. When Charam was surrounded by Iranians at the center of the Farud government, Farud came to his mother Javiera. And he told his mother how to identify myself with the Iranians. His mother said: Search two people inside the Iranian army, one is Zangay-i Shavaran and the other is Bahram. And so Zangay-i Shavaran enters the literature of Iran-Turan war.

== Sources ==
- Ferdowsi Shahnameh. From the Moscow version. Mohammed Publishing. ISBN 964-5566-35-5
