= Bahram (Shahnameh) =

Iranian mythological hero of the epic poem Shahnameh

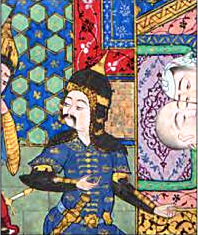
Bahram in the Shahnameh

Bahram is an Iranian hero in Shahnameh, the national epic of Greater Iran. He is the son of Goudarz and brother of Rohham, Giv and Hojir. In the story of Siavash, he and Zange-ye Shavaran are Siavash's counselors. They unsuccessfully try to convince Siavash not to go to Turan. When Siavash goes to Turan and abandons the Iranian army, Bahram is put in command of the Iranian army until the arrival of Tous. His most important adventure is in the story of Farud, where he fights against the Turanian army along with other Iranian heroes. When the Iranian army is marching towards Turan, they encounter Farud, who along with Tokhar (تُخوار) is standing on a mountain. Tous, the spahbed of the Iranian army does not know Farud and thinks that he is a Turanian foe. He sends Bahram to go there and kill both of them. When Bahram arrives, Farud introduces himself and says that he is the son of Siavash and wants to avenge Afrasiab. Bahram comes back to Tous and tells him that they are not enemies and instead they want to join the Iranian army to fight against Afrasiab. Tous, however, does not believe this and orders to kill Farud. Bahram unsuccessfully tries to restrain Tous and the Iranians from killing Farud and his companion. However, Farud was eventually slain by Rohham and Bizhan.

Bahram, seeing himself as somehow to blame for Farud's death, no longer cares for his own life. In a subsequent war between Iran and Turan shortly after Farud's death, he loses his whip on the battlefield. Although Goudarz, his father, and Giv, his brother advice him to not go for the whip, he sees this incident as a bad omen and puts his life in danger and returns to the battlefield solely in search of his whip. He finds an injured Iranian soldier and binds his wounds. He finally finds his whip, but at the last minute, he is surrounded by Turanian men. He bravely fights them but at last, he is severely injured by Tazhāv (تَژاو) and shortly after he dies from the wound. The unknown author of Mojmal al-tavarikh mentions him as the master of ceremonies (amīr-e majles) in Kay Khosrow's reign.

== Family tree ==
Kashvad
Goudarz
Giv	Roham	Bahram	Hojir
Bizhan	Farhad
