= Bijan and Manijeh =

Love story in the Shahnameh

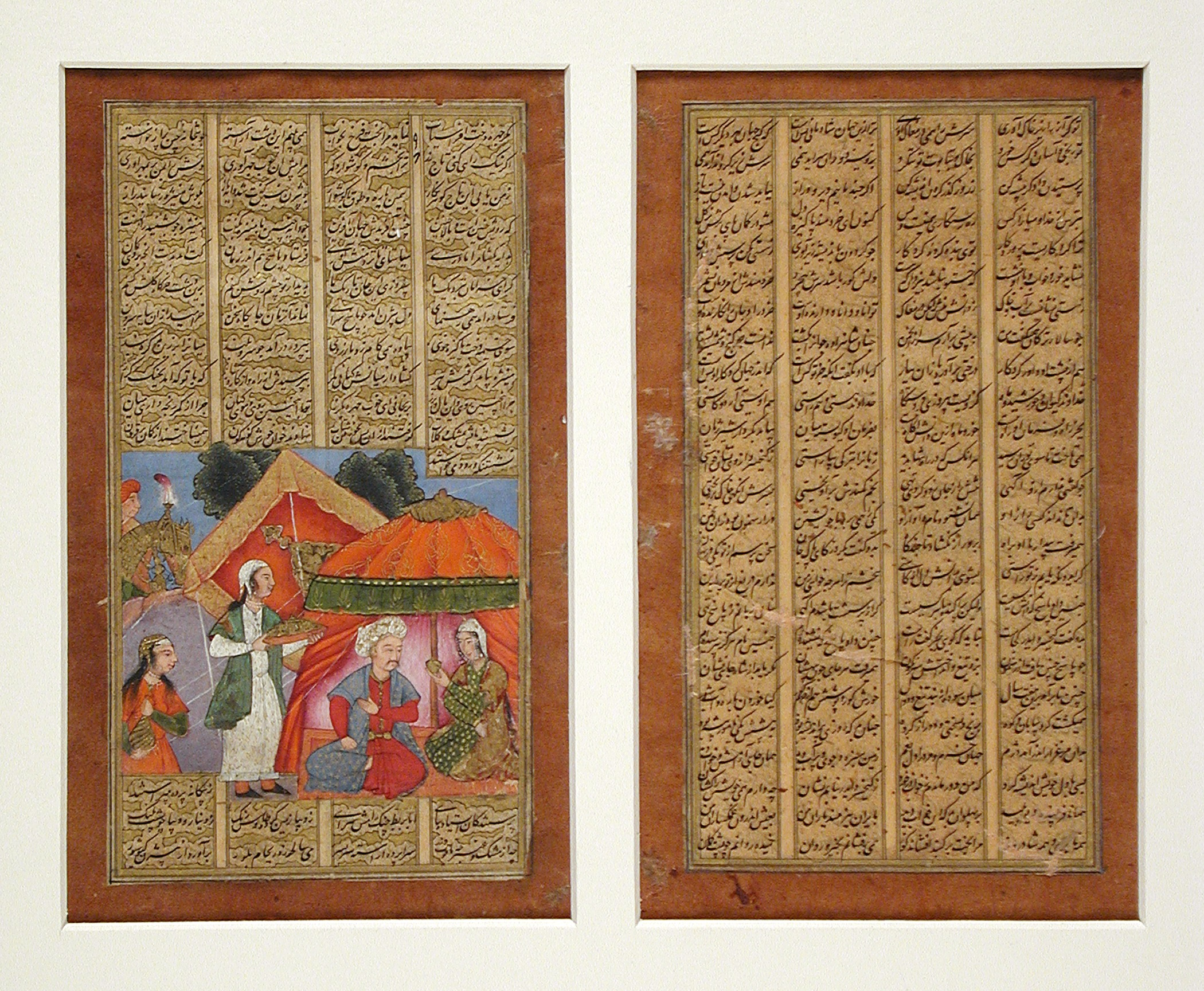
Bijan tent near Manijeh Palace. He is talking to Nadeem Manijeh

Bijan and Manijeh (also Bizhan and Manizheh, Persian: بيژن و منيژه, romanized: Bēžan-ō Manīža) is a love story in Ferdowsi's Shahnameh (Book of Kings). Bijan was the son of Giv, a famous Iranian knight during the reign of Kay Khosrow, the Shah of Iran, and Banu Goshasp, the heroine daughter of Rostam. Bijan falls in love with Manijeh, the daughter of Afrasiab, the king of Turan and the greatest enemy of Iran. The tale of his suffering and Manijeh's constancy has been quoted by several others.

== The tragedy of Bijan and Manijeh ==
People from Armenia complain to Kay Khosrow, the Shah of Iran, that wild boars are invading their fields. Bijan fights the boars, forcing them back to their lairs. The day after, Gorgin, an Iranian knight who had accompanied Bijan on the quest, describes the beautiful gardens of Afrasiab to Bijan, tempting him to cross the border from Iran into the mythical land of Turan on the northern shores of the Caspian Sea. Turan is ruled over by the evil and egotistical King Afrasiab. In the garden, he meets Manijeh, Afrasiab's beautiful daughter. They fall madly in love; however, knowing her father's reaction to accepting an Iranian prince in her private chambers, Manijeh gives Bijan a sleeping potion and smuggles him into her house. He wakes, and Manijeh and her maids keep him hidden for many days. Eventually Afrasiab learns of Bijan and captures him.

Afrasiab sentences Manijeh into exile, so that both Bijan and Manijeh are forced to live out their days in the wilderness. Bijan also sends secret messages to Rostam, the Iranian hero charged with keeping the country safe from Afrasiab. Kai Khosrow, the Shah of Iran, looks into his Crystal Cup (of Jamshid), and sees Bijan in the forest. Instead of launching a frontal invasion to find Bijan, the hero Rostam disguises himself as a merchant and, along with a few knights, enters Turan. When Manijeh hears that a wealthy merchant from Iran has arrived in Turan, she hopes that he was sent to find Bijan. They find Bijan and escape into Iran where there is much rejoicing at Bijan return to his homeland. Furious with his own daughter's treason, Afrasiab declares war on Iran. The Iranian and Turanian armies meet and a mighty battle ensues. The skies turn dark from the dust of the battlefield while trumpets and clashing cymbals signify the attack of the Iranian cavalry. Turan is defeated, and Afrasiab is forced to return home without his daughter and in shame.

== Family tree ==
Kashvad
Rostam | Goudarz
Banu Goshasp | Giv | Afrasiab
Bijan | Manijeh

== Sources ==
- Ferdowsi, Shahnameh. From the Moscow version. Mohammed Publishing. ISBN 964-5566-35-5
- Bijan and Manijeh, by Hakim Abol-Qasem Ferdowsi Tousi, translated into English by Helen Zimmern (Iran Chamber Society).
- A king's book of kings: the Shah-nameh of Shah Tahmasp, an exhibition catalog from The Metropolitan Museum of Art (fully available online as PDF), which contains material on Bijan and Manijeh
