= Bizhan Nama =

BĪŽAN-NAMA (Persian: بیژن نامه) is a Persian epic poem of ca. 1,900 couplets relating the adventures of the legendary hero Bīžan son of Giv. Zabiollah Safa, an Iranian literary scholars notes that a large number verses of thies epic were taken from the Bīžan and Manīža in Ferdowsī’s Šāh-nāma. Jalal Matini after closely postulated that the epic is mainly a copy of Ferdowsī’s story with some verses added by the author and some of Ferdowsi’s omitted.
