= Mard o mard =

Single combat in Ancient Persia

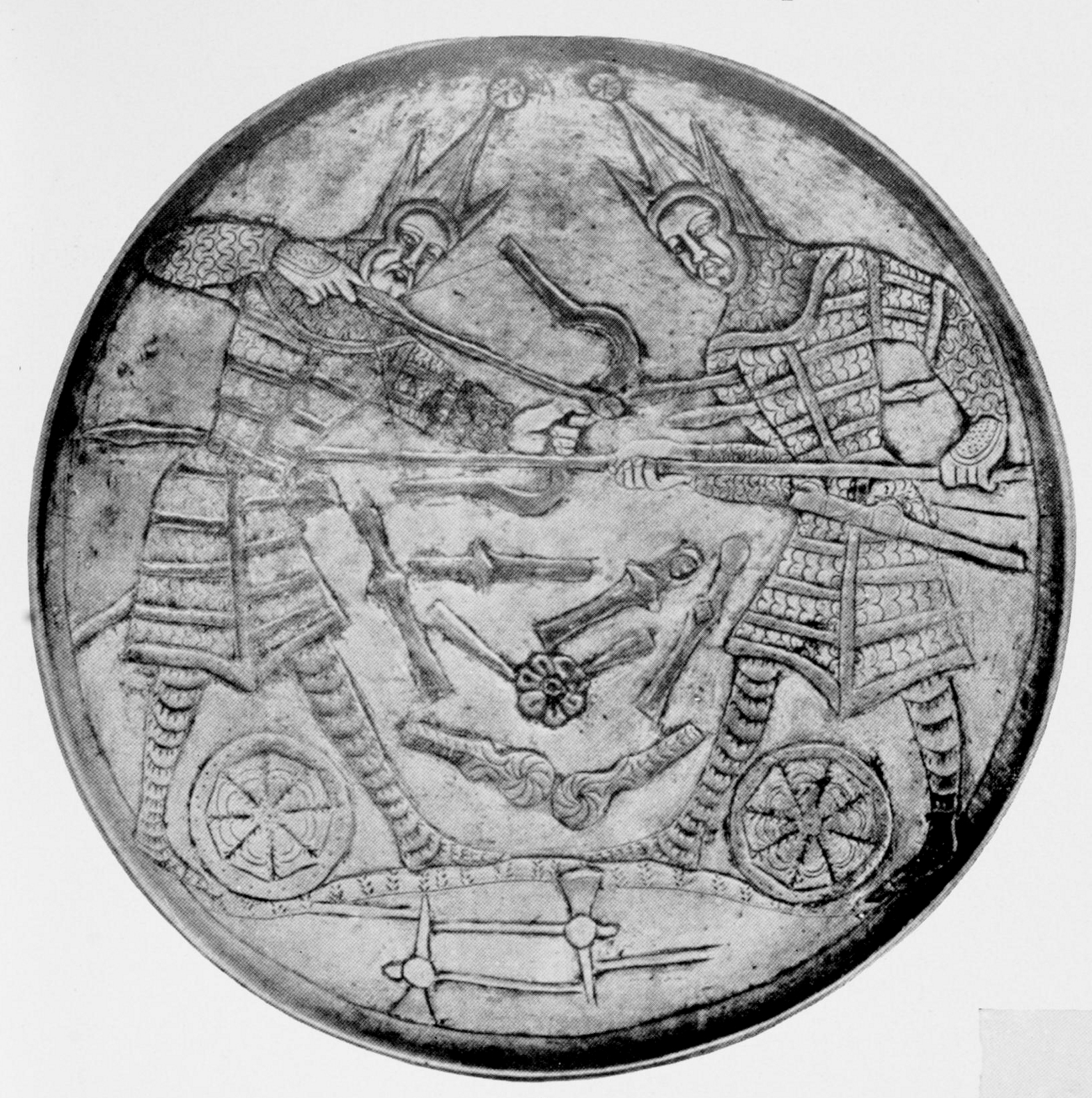
The Sogdian "Kulagysh plate", depicting a heroic single combat scene leading to the death of both sides

Mard ō mard (Middle Persian; literally "man to man") was an ancient Iranian tradition of single combat, the Sasanian Empire being most known for using it. During a battle, the Sasanian troops would use taunts and war cries to provoke the enemy into a single duel with a Sasanian champion. The tradition meant much to the Sasanians—in 421, during Bahram V's war against the Romans in 421–422, Ardazanes, a member of the "Immortals", was in a single duel killed by the Roman comes Areobindus.

In Sasanian art several mard o mard depictions are preserved in rock-reliefs in Naqsh-e Rostam and in a cameo of Shapur I and Valerian.

Single combats have been narrated in Shahnameh ("The Book of Kings") of Ferdowsi, a notable example being those of the story of Davazdah Rokh ("Twelve Combats").

== Sources ==
- Nicolle, David (1996), Sassanian Armies: the Iranian Empire Early 3rd to Mid-7th Centuries AD, Stockport: Montvert, ISBN 978-1-874101-08-6
- Shapur Shahbazi, A. (1986). "Army i. Pre-Islamic Iran". Encyclopaedia Iranica, Vol. II, Fasc. 5. London et al. pp. 489–499.
