= Fariburz (Shahnameh) =

Character in the Shahnameh

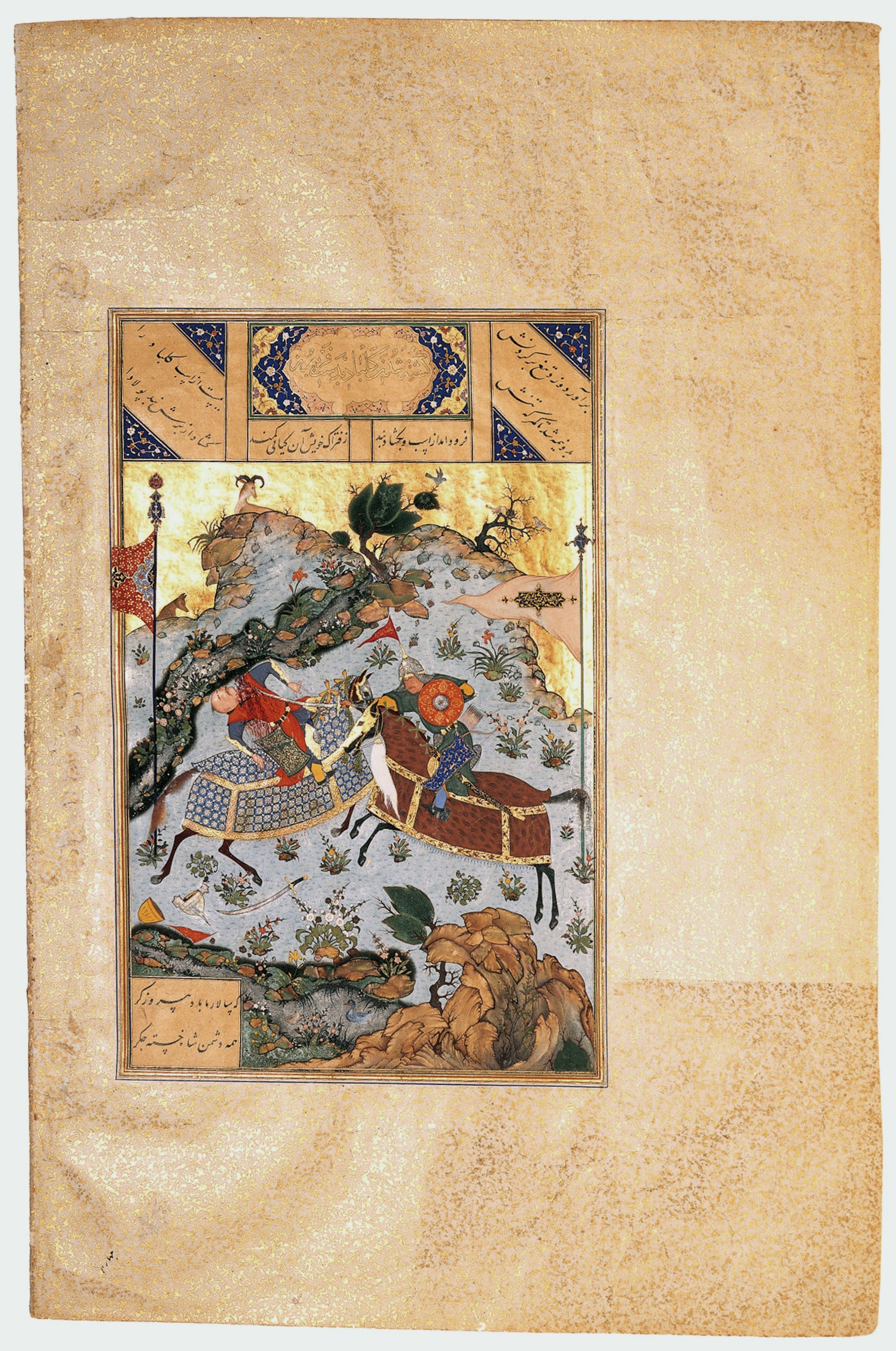
The First Joust of the Rooks: Fariburz versus Kalbad, Miniature from the Shahnameh of Shah Tahmasp by Shaykh Mohammad Sabzevari. Tabriz, c. 1540. Aga Khan Museum

Fariburz (Persian: فَریبُرز) is an Iranian hero in Shahnameh, the national epic, of Greater Iran.

== Mythical biography ==
=== Family ===
He is son of Kay Kavus and brother of Siyâvash. He appears in the story of Mazandaran, the story of Sohrab and the story of Siavash.

=== Role in mythological history ===
His most important role is when Giv brings Kay Khosrow back to Iran. Tous, another Iranian hero is opposed to the rulership of Kay Khosrow in favor of Fariburz, because Kay Khosrow is grandson of Afrasiab. Kay Kavus, unable to choose between Kay Khosrow and Fariburz, decides to give the rulership to the one who can successfully capture a fortress in Ardabil. Tous and Fariburz are unable to take the fortress, while Giv and Kay Khosrow are able to take it easily. Kay Khosrow thus becomes the king of Iran. Fariburz thereafter obeys Kay Khosrow and participates in the wars between Iran and Turan. Fariburz married Farangis, Kay Khosrow's mother. Fariburz is among those heroes that disappear in the snow after Kay Khosrow's ascend.

Bal'ami and the unknown author of Mojmal al-tawārikh, have recorded his name as Borzāfarah and Borzfari respectively, and according to the latter, Ferdowsi has changed his name in order to fit the meter of Shahnameh. His name may be related to Barzapharnes, the name of a Parthian general under Pacorus.
