= Goudarz =

Iranian mythological hero of the epic poem Shahnameh

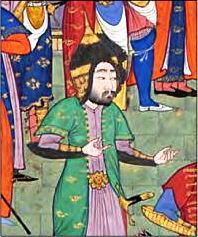
Goudarz in the Shahnameh of Shah Tahmasp

Goudarz (Persian: گودرز) is a hero from Iranian national history and one of the main figures in the Shahnameh, the national epic of Greater Iran, and progenitor of one of its most prominent families. He is son of Kashvad, father of Giv and Roham and the grandfather of Bizhan. His first appearance is in the time of Kay Kavus and thereafter he appears almost in every story of the heroic age, sometimes he is the spahbed of Iranian Army. His personality is described very positively with traits such as loyalty, patience and altruism.

== In Shahnameh ==
Goudarz plays a vital role in the story of Kay Khosrow. Kay Khosrow is one of the greatest kings of Shahnameh and he is the son of Siavash and Farangis and the grandson of Kay Kavus. Kay Khosrow was born and grown up in Turan. One day the Soroush (angel) comes to Goudarz in his dream and tells him that the son of Siavash is in Turan and Iranians should go there and bring him back to Iran. He tells Goudarz that only his son, Giv, could do this job. Goudarz then sends Giv to Turan in search of Kay Khosrow and after seven years, Giv finally finds Kay Khosrow and brings him back to Iran. At this time, Goudarz is an old man.

Goudarz is the one who kills Piran Veyse in the story of Davazdah Rokh.

Unlike many other Iranian heroes who disappear in snow after Kay Khosrow's ascent, Goudarz survives this accident along with Rostam and Zāl.

== Historical Goudarz ==
It has been suggested that Goudarz in Shahnameh is actually Gotarzes II of Parthia. The only difference is that in Shahnameh, Goudarz is the father of Giv, but in history it is the opposite, the historical Gotarzes is son of a certain Giv (this is known from his coins).

According to Sharaf al-Din Bitlisi in the late 16th century, chiefs of the Kalhori people claimed to be descended from Goudarz.

== Family tree ==
Kashvad
Goudarz
Giv	Roham	Bahram	Hojir
Bizhan	Farhad
