= Kashvad =

Character in the Shahnameh

Keshvād (Persian: کشواد, also spelled Kashvād), is a prominent Iranian mythical hero and a member of the Goudarzian clan, in a story narrated in the poetic opus of Shahnameh, the national epic of Iran by the 10th-century poet Ferdowsi Tousi. Known for his valor, he is often referred to as the "vanquisher of armies" (lashkarshekan لشکرشکن) and wears a "golden helmet" (zarrin-kolah زرین‌کلاه). He is described as one of the most courageous warriors of his time, and is portrayed as a noble and experienced commander who serves under Iranian kings such as Kay Qobad and Nouzar during the prolonged wars against the Turanians. Keshvad is particularly known for his role in several key battles, often fighting alongside legendary heroes like Rostam and Fariburz. His most significant feat in the Shahnameh is the liberation of Iranian captives from Turan. His loyalty, bravery and leadership are highlighted in conflicts where Iran defends itself against the forces of Afrasiab, the king of Turan. Some sources also mention his son, Goudarz, who continues his legacy as a hero. In some accounts, Keshvad's ancestry can be traced back to Jamshid through the Kiyanian kings, Fereydun, Iraj, and Manuchehr.

== Family tree ==
Kashvad
Goudarz
Giv | Roham | Bahram | Hojir
Bizhan | Farhad
