= Iran (Shahnameh) =

Iran in the Shahnameh

Shahnameh Countries
- Type: Ancient Country of BC
- First period kings: Fereydun, Manuchehr; Nowzar
- Second kings of BC: Kay Kāvus; Kay Khosrow

Iran (Persian: ایران) is mentioned in the Shahnameh in the middle of Fereydoun Kingdom as a country or nation. Before the reign of Fereydoun, during the reigns of Zahhak, Jamshid, Tahmuras, and Keyumars the first Iran king, There is no word about Iran. The first of the term Iran is during the marriage of three sons of Fereydoun. In this sense, the name of Iran is from the period of Fereydoun reign.

== The first period of the kings of Iran BC ==
At the height of his power, Fereydoun divided the land under his command into six Country or nations because of its vast territory. Six countries were divided into three sons, Iran and Dashd Gardan were gifted to Iraj. The land of Iran had many folks and tribes that were divided into small independent states. But in the face of external danger, especially the Turanian attack, they came together to resolve the danger. What was mentioned in the Shahnameh Iran was initially a small tribe among the other Iranian tribes that all spoke Persian, but the nomadic and Turkic Iranians were also included.

The first large Iranian government was the Medes government, which was formed around the 7th century BC and the Medes were able to overcome the enemy. The Median Tribal Union saw its power in the face of the enemy in the unity and solidarity of the tribes. Before the union of the Medes of Iranian countries tribe, such as Manna or Parsua, could not stand up to the enemy for lack of unity.

The reform of Iran as a country has been mentioned again during the period of Manuchehr attack on Salm and Tur. After the death of Fereydoun, Manuchehr sat on the throne of Iran and during this period Iran was a powerful country. During the coronation of Manuchehr, all Iranian states and countries were present, especially Sām Pishva of Zabol and Qaren King Ray.

== Second period of the kings of Iran BC ==
Due to the severe defeat of the Iranians in the Iran-Turan war, their independence was lost for a long time, and the Turanians became dominant over much of Iran territory with new faiths and ideas. Other lands that the Turanians could not control were occupied by Zabolians. Zaav, Gershasp, and Kay Kawād are the three Persian kings or Zabols who were ruled by Zāl and were actually puppets. But Kay Kāvus, the son of Kay Kawād, wanted to rescue Iran from the captivity of both Turan and Zabul, but it was hard work. In fact, after Manuchehr death, Iran had lost its independence, and now Kay kavus wanted to win that golden age. According to the texts of the Shahnameh of Iranians at the time of Kay kavus and his son Kay Khosrow, not only did he gain his independence but he was able to erase his greatest historical enemy, the Turan government, and be independent forever.

== Sources ==
- Ferdowsi Shahnameh. From the Moscow version. Mohammed Publishing. ISBN 964-5566-35-5
- History of media. Writing by Igor M. Diakonoff. ISBN 964-445-106-6
