= Tous son of Nowzar =

Mythological Iranian prince

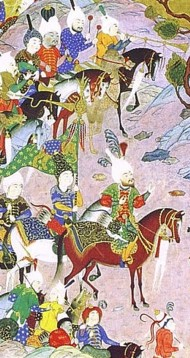
Tous in the Shahnameh

Tous son of Nowzar (Persian: توس نوذر) is a mythological Iranian prince and hero from the Pishdadian dynasty, whose deeds and adventures were told in Ferdowsi's Shahnameh.

Tous was a wise and brave man but also proud and pugnacious. And because of these characteristics he did not possess the king's divine glory (Middle Persian: khvarrah; Persian: farr) and was not elected by the other nobles of Iran as heir to his father King Nowzar. Instead, his cousin Zaav became the new king of Iran and founder of the famous Kayanian dynasty. Nevertheless, Tous was a loyal vassal to the following kings Kai Kobad and Kai Kavoos and a great warrior. He defended Iran against her old arch-rival Turan, the land of the Turanians. Among the first and noblest knights of Iran, Tous accompanied the king on several campaigns, and his coat of arms shows the device of a golden elephant as well as he and his kin wore golden shoes.

But finally when Kai Kavoos chose his grandson Kai Khosrow as heir to the throne of Iran, Tous rebelled, and again declared his claims as oldest son of Nowzar. In Tous' opinion the House of Kai Kobad had lost its right to rule because Kai Khosrow has had a Turanian mother and thus Tous feared that with his coronation at least Turan, Iran's arch-enemy, would come to power. A civil war about succession broke out between the House of Tous and the House of Godarz. Godarz was another heroic warrior of Iran, a loyal vassal to the king’s wishes and Kai Khosrows supporter. During this war on both sides many famous warriors were killed, like Rivniz (Tous' son-in-law), Zarasp (Tous' son) and Farud (Khosrow's half-brother). Thus, to end this bloody civil war the old Kai Kavoos decided to make an assessment between the claimant to the throne Tous and his own heir Kai Khosrow. Tous failed in the challenge for the throne but Kai Khosrow won the test. And finally Tous accepted the result. He paid obedience to the new designed king and for his loyalty Tous was granted the greatest honours as a royal prince. After Tous protected Iran and the new king against several demons and dragons in many adventures, Kai Khosrow marched with a huge army against Turan. Tous was commander-in-chief and at least the Iranians could defeat the Turanians in a final battle. Then one day in wintertime the whole royal court arranged a shoot in the woods, and also Tous was among Kai Khosrow’s companions who rode into wilderness and suddenly disappeared completely behind the fallen snow. And it is said that "at the end of times, at Judgement Day he will occur again as one of the thirty Immortals, to fight at the side of the Holy Saviour for Good, and in the final apocalyptical battle he will destroy all creatures of Evil."

Tous founded the city of Tous in the province of Khorassan next to today’s city of Mashhad. It is said that the city of Tous was the capital of Parthia and the residence of King Vishtaspa, who was the first converted to Zoroastianism. The descendants following their mythological progenitor Tous were mentioned as the House of Tous, the House Nowzari or at least as Shahzadegi Tous ben Naudharan and some Iranian families claim to be offspring of the hero Tous, like the tribe of Zarrin Kafsh.

== Family Tree ==
Manuchehr
Nowzar
Tous	Gostahm

== Literature ==
Ayazi, Burhan: A’ineh’-ye Sanandaj, Amir Kabir, Tehran 1360 (1981).

Ferdowsi, Abul-Qasem: Shahnameh ("The Book of the Kings"), edit. by Djalal Khaleghi-Motlagh, Reclam Verlag, Stuttgart 2010.

Justi, Ferdinand: Iranisches Namensbuch, Marburg 1895, reprint: Georg Olms Verlag, Hildesheim 1963.

Yarshater, Ehsan: "Iranian National History", in: Cambridge History of Iran, edit. by Ehsan Yarshater, Vol. 3 (1), Cambridge University Press, London 2003, pp. 359–480.
