= Rohham =

Mythical hero of Iranian mythology

Rohham (Persian: رُهام) is a notable Iranian paladin and hero in the Persian epic Shahnameh. He is a prominent member of the House of Goudarz, characterized by his loyalty and military prowess during the reigns of Kay Kavus and Kay Khosrow.

== Lineage ==
Rohham is the son of Goudarz, grandson of Kashvad, and brother to other legendary heroes including Giv, Bahram, and Hojir. In the genealogical structure of the epic, he is the father of the hero Farhad and the uncle of Bizhan.

== Military exploits ==
Rohham is best known for his participation in the following events:

- Battle of the Twelve Rooks (Davazdah Rokh): In this pivotal battle, Rohham was one of the eleven champions chosen to represent Iran. He fought against the Turanian champion Barman and emerged victorious, killing him on the battlefield.
- Wars of Vengeance: He was a key commander in the campaigns led by Kay Khosrow to avenge the death of Siyavash.

== Etymology ==
The name Rohham (or Rohām) is analyzed in Avestan contexts. According to some interpretations, it is derived from Raohāma- or related to the concept of "Majestic Wine" or "Wine of Excellence." In modern Persian folklore, it is also associated with a legendary bird.
