= Farangis =

Female character in the Persian epic Shahnameh

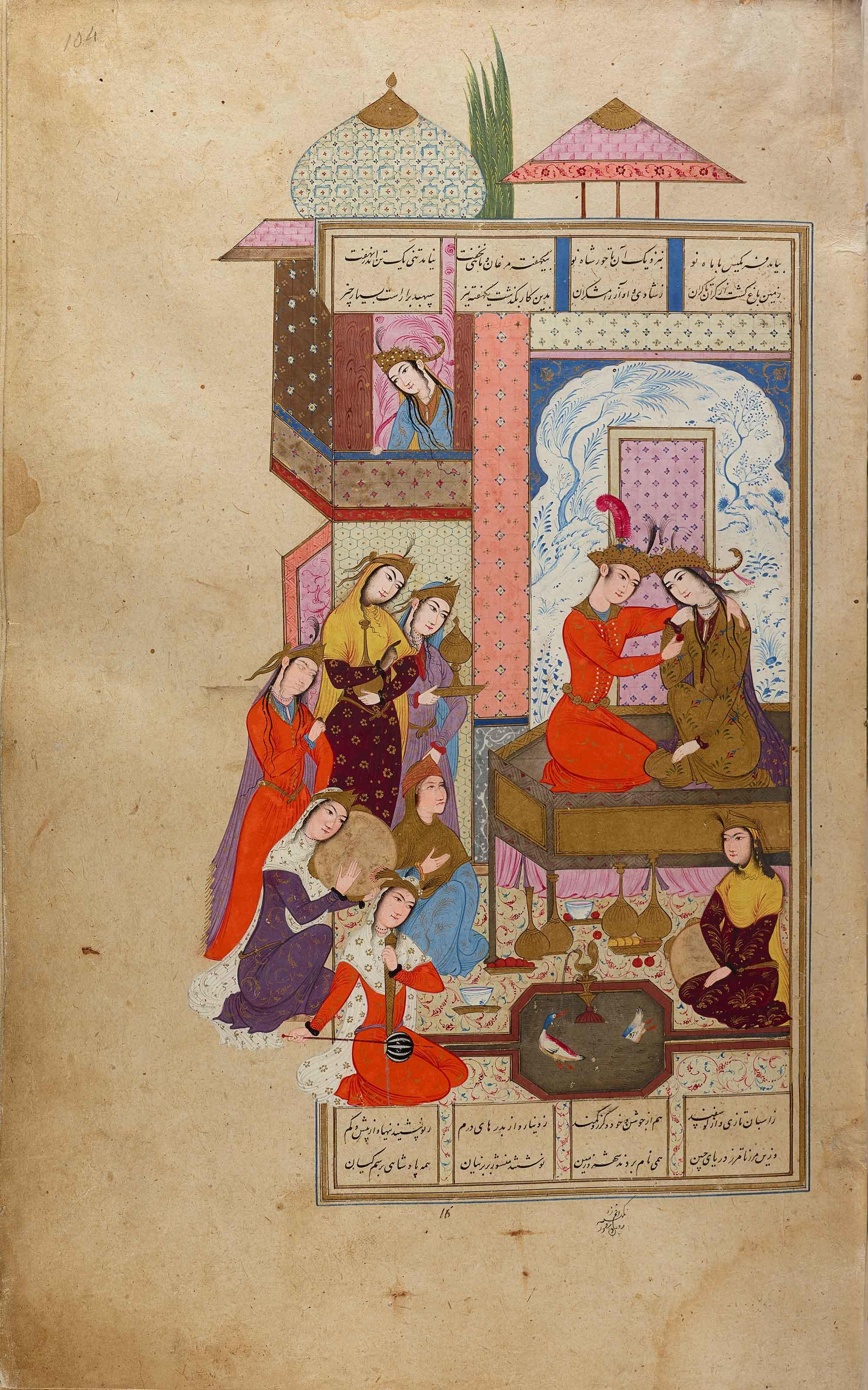
"Siavush Marries Farangis". Folio from a Shahnameh, painted by Mo'en Mosavver in Isfahan, Iran, dated 1654

Farangis (Persian: فَرَنگیس) or Frigis (Persian: فریگیس) is a female character in the Persian epic Shahnameh.

== Fictional biography ==
=== Family ===
She is the eldest daughter of Afrasiab, king of Turan. She is also the second and favourite wife of Siyâvash, the saintlike prince of Iran (Siyâvash's first wife was Juraira daughter of Piran Viseh) and mother of a legendary hero and later Shah of Iran, Kai Khosrow.

=== Life ===
Although a Turanian by birth, Farangis shows loyalty to her husband's kingdom and dynasty. She accompanies her son when he leaves Turan in the hopes of gathering an Iranian army to avenge Siyâvash.

After the murder of her husband Siyâvash and being left with her son Kai Khosrow, Farangis mourns him for a year. The dignitaries at the court of King Kavus try to console her. They promise that her brother-in-law Fariborz will avenge the murder of his brother. Further, they present Fariborz as a suitable husband for her. Aided by Rostam, Fariborz takes Farangis to his seraglio.
