= Giv (Shahnameh) =

Iranian mythological hero of the epic poem Shahnameh

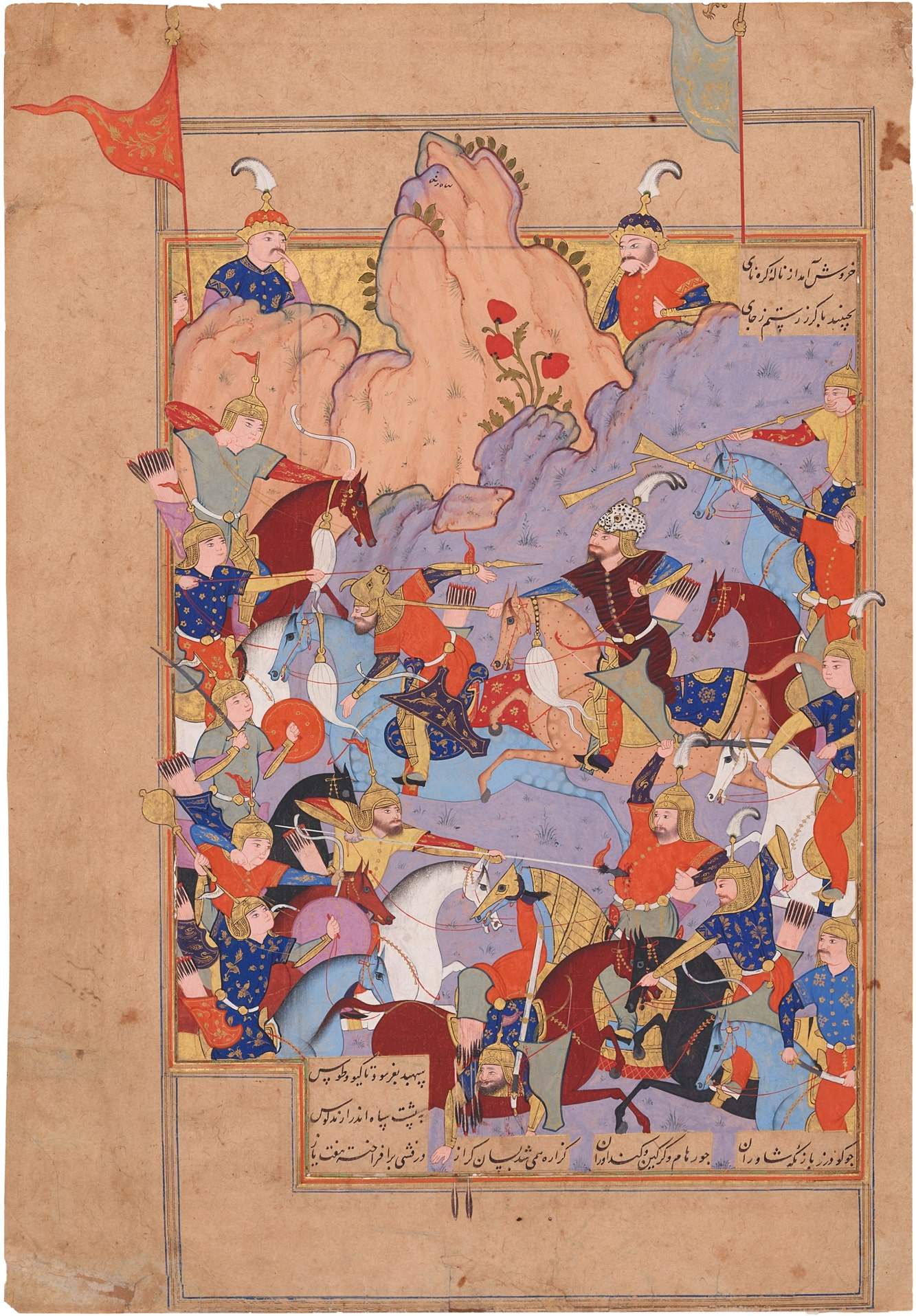
Giv battling Tur. Miniature by Siyavush Beg from the Shahnameh of Shah Ismail II. Qazvin, 1576-77. Rietberg Museum

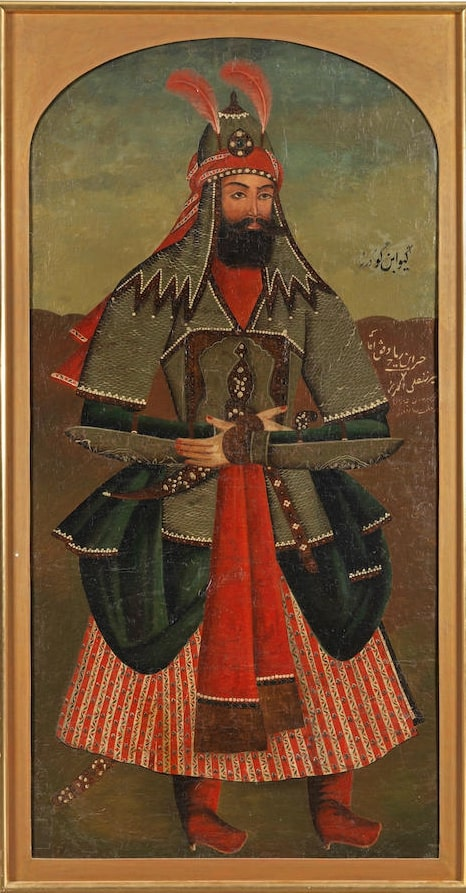
Illustration of Giv, made in the first quarter of the 19th-century in Qajar Iran

Giv or Gev (Persian: گیو) is a legendary Iranian knight and one of the main heroes in the New Persian epic poem of Shahnameh (Book of Kings), the national epic of Iran. A member of the House of Karen, he is the son of Godarz, brother of Roham and father of Bizhan, as well as a descendant of Kaveh the Blacksmith.

Giv also appears in another New Persian text, the Banu Goshasp-nama, where he marries Banu Goshasp, the daughter of the mythological warrior Rostam. The character of Giv is most likely based on a historical figure—the father of the Parthian monarch Gotarzes II (r. 40–51).

Giv is mentioned in the Middle Persian Zoroastrian document of Bundahishn as "Beirazd the wrestler," where he is referred to as one of the immortals that will aid the eschatological Zoroastrian saviour Saoshyant.

The medieval historian al-Tabari (died 923) records Giv's name as Bīy, while Hasan ibn Muhammad Qumi refers to him as Bīb, and credits him with the foundation of a rural district in the city of Qom. The German orientalist Theodor Nöldeke states that the names Bīy and Bīb are derived from the older form Wēw, which was still in use by Hamza al-Isfahani (died after 961) in his Mujmal al-tawarikh.

Giv brought Kay Khosrow back from Turan to Iran after a seven-year search. As a reward, he received the invincible mailcoat of Siyavash. Despite Giv's leading role as a commander-in-chief of the army during the reign of Kay Kavus and Kay Khosrow, his personality is to some extent eclipsed by that of Godarz and Bizhan.

== The story of Kay Khosrow ==
Kay Khosrow is one of the greatest kings of Shahnameh and he is the son of Siavash and Farangis and the grandson of Kay Kavus. Kay Khosrow was born and grown up in Turan. One day the Soroush (angel) comes to Goudarz in his dream and tells him that the son of Siavash is in Turan and Iranians should go there and bring him back to Iran. He tells Goudarz that only his son, Giv, could do this job. Goudarz then sends Giv to Turan in search of Kay Khosrow and after seven years, Giv finally finds Kay Khosrow and brings him back to Iran.

== Disappearance ==
Giv along with most of other Iranian heroes, disappears in snow during Kay Khosrow's ascent, because they don't have Farr-e Izadi (a divine force).

== Family tree ==
Kashvad
Goudarz
Giv	Roham	Bahram	Hojir
Bizhan	Farhad

== Sources ==
- Gazerani, Saghi (2015). The Sistani Cycle of Epics and Iran's National History: On the Margins of Historiography. Brill. ISBN 9789004282964.
- Khaleghi-Motlagh, Djalal (2001). "Gēv". In Yarshater, Ehsan (ed.). Encyclopædia Iranica. Vol. X/6: Germany VI–Gindaros. London and New York: Routledge & Kegan Paul. pp. 577–578. ISBN 978-0-933273-55-9.
