= Bizhan (Shahnameh) =

Iranian mythological hero of the epic poem Shahnameh

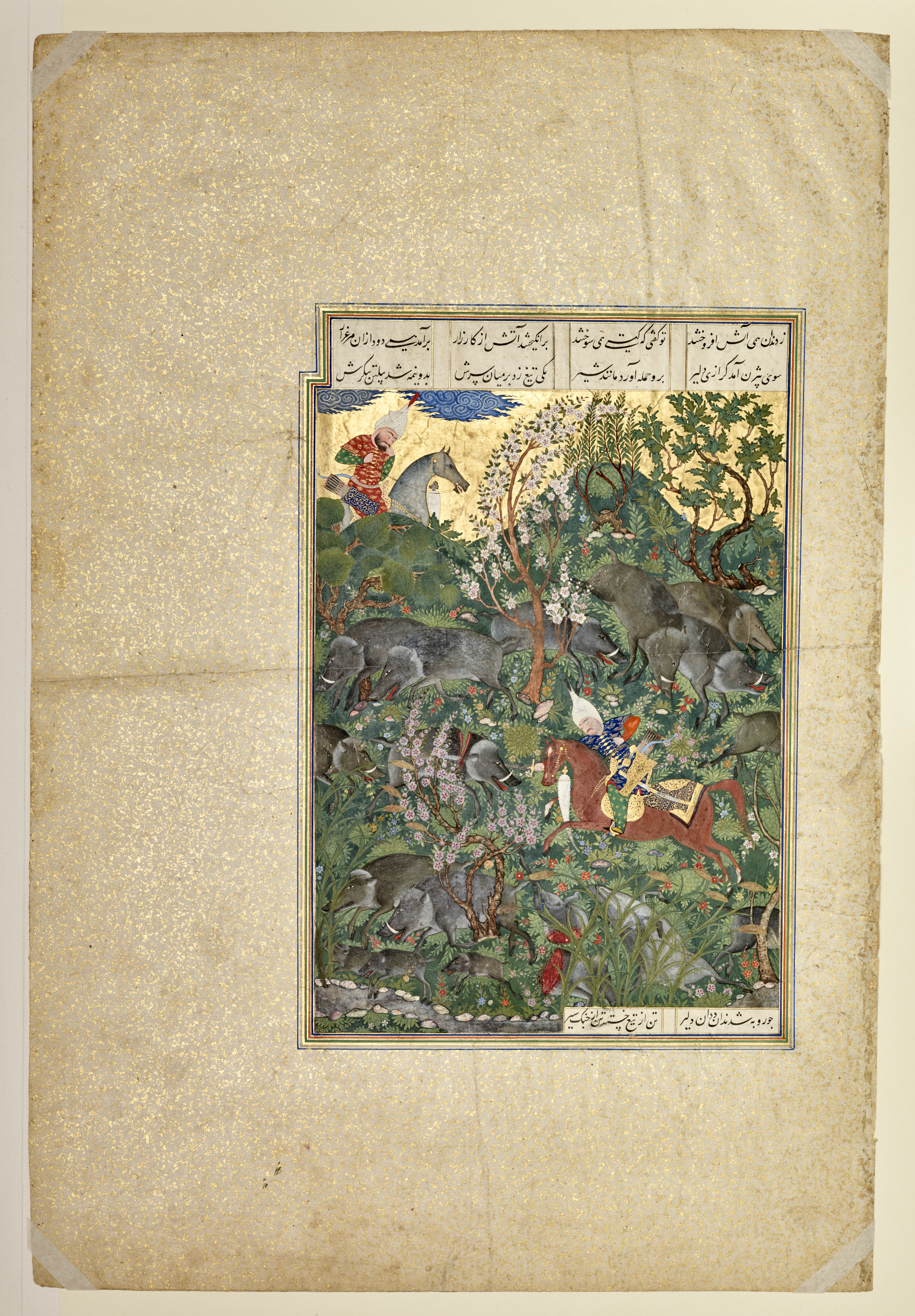
Bizhan slaughters the wild boars of Irman, miniature from the Shahnameh of Shah Tahmasp. The Keir Collection of Islamic Art

Bizhan, Bezhan, Bijan or Bejan (Persian: بیژن, romanized: Bēžan) is one of the main Iranian heroes in the Shahnameh, the national epic of Greater Iran. Bizhan is son of Giv and Banu Goshasp and grandson of Goudarz and Rostam. Although he appears in almost all stories in the heroic age of the Shahnameh, he has a significant role in the story of Bizhan and Manizhe, where he falls in love with Manizha, the daughter of Afrasiab, the king of Turan and longtime enemy of Iran.

Outside of the Shahnameh, he has been celebrated in other epics such as Faramarznameh. Another epic poem named Bizhannameh is dedicated to his adventures. It consists of almost 1,900 verses.

It has been suggested that Bizhan is a Parthian figure. Vizhan is the name of the grandson of Gotarzes I and the grandfather of Gotarzes II. According to Theodor Nöldeke, noble Parthian families who were guardians of Iranian national epics, later attributed some of the exploits of the ancient heroes to their own ancestors.

== Family tree ==
Kashvad
Rostam | Goudarz
Banu Goshasp | Giv | Afrasiab
Bijan | Manijeh
