= Kay Kāvus =

Legendary king in Persian mythology

Kay Kāvus کی‌کاووس
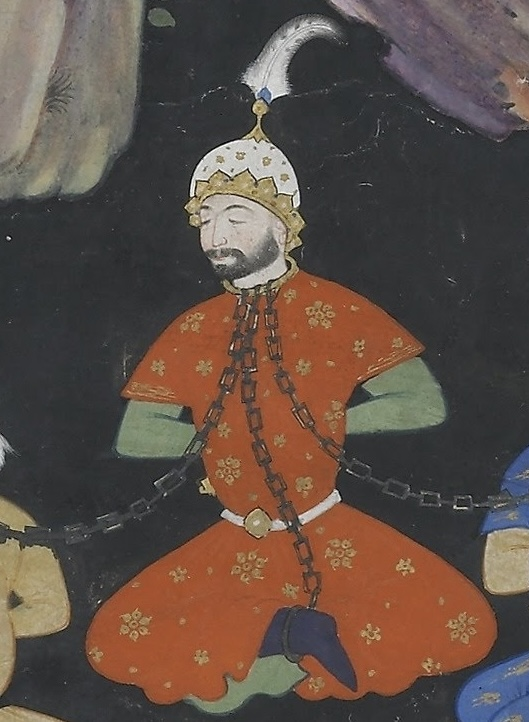
- Kay-Ka'us chained in a grotto by the white demon. Siyavush Beg Gorji. Isma'il II Shahnama. Qazvin, 1576-77 (FGA F2006.7)

Shah of Greater Iran
- Reign: 150 years
- Issue: Siyâvash
- Dynasty: Kayanian
- Father: Kay Qobād
Kay Kāvus
Creature information
- Folklore: Persian mythology
Origin
- Country: Greater Iran

Kay Kāvus (Persian: کی‌کاووس; Avestan: 𐬐𐬀𐬎𐬎𐬌 𐬎𐬯𐬀𐬥 Kauui Usan); sometimes Kai-Káús or Kai-Kaus, is a shah in the mythical history of Greater Iran and a character in the Shāhnāmeh. He is the son of Kay Qobād and the father of prince Seyāvash. Kāvus rules Iran for 150 years during which he is frequently though increasingly grudgingly aided by the famous hero Rostam. He is succeeded by his grandson Kay Khosrow. According to Al-Masudi, he built "a tower to challenge God", and invaded Yemen.

== The flying throne ==
The Flying Throne of Kay Kāvus was a legendary eagle-propelled craft built by Kay Kāvus, used for flying the king all the way to China.

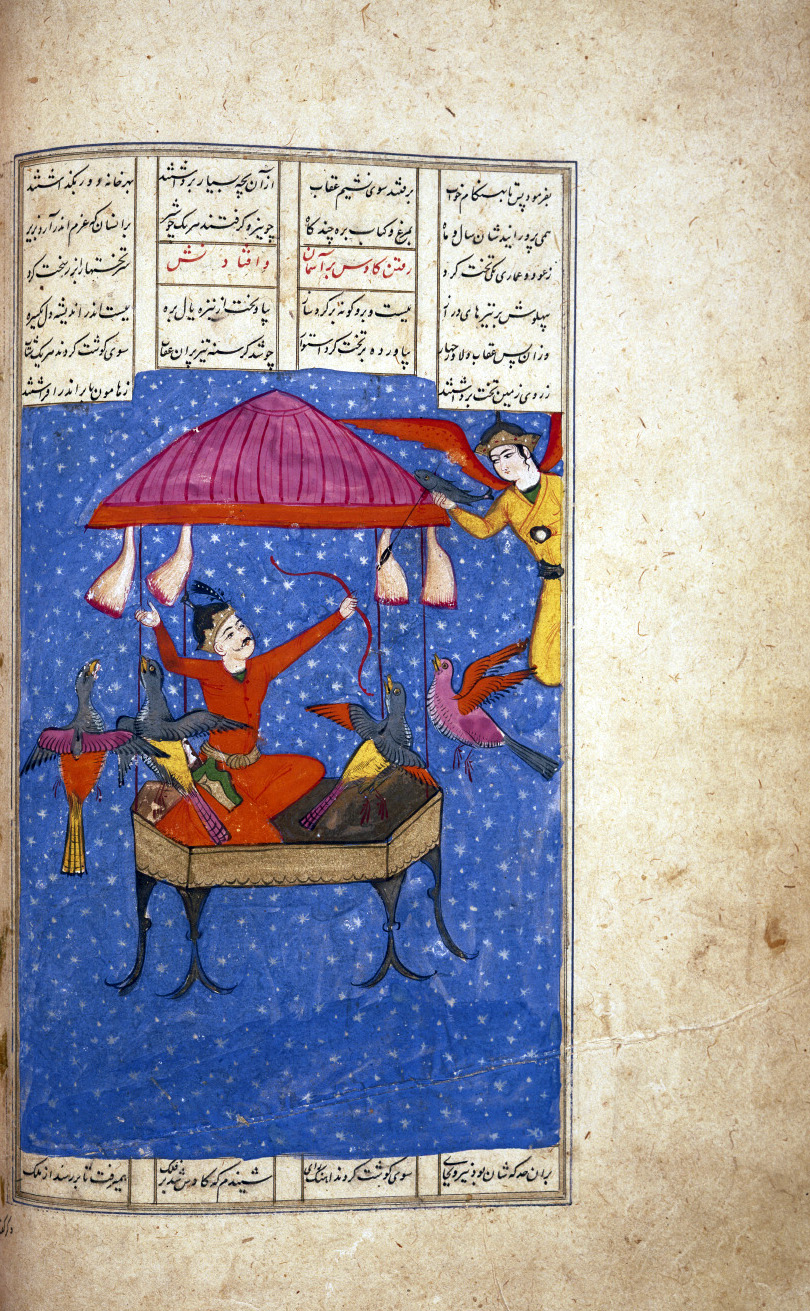
Kay Kāvus on his flying throne. Illustration from a Persian manuscript.

According to the Shāhnāmeh, Kāvus had a flying craft made consisting of a throne to the corners of which were attached four long poles pointing upward. It was made of wood and gold and he attached specially trained eagles. Pieces of meat were attached at the top of each pole and the ravenous eagles were chained to the feet. As the eagles tried to reach the meat they caused the throne to fly. The craft flew the king all the way to China, where the eagles grew tired and the craft came down. Rostam eventually had to rescue the king who, miraculously, survived the crash.

== Mansions ==
According to the Bundahishn legend, Kay Kāvus built five mansions: "One was of gold wherein he settled, two were of glass in which were his stables, and two were of steel in which was his flock. Therefrom issued all tastes, and waters of the springs giving immortality, which smite old age, that is, when a decrepit man enters by this gate, he comes out as a youth of fifteen years from the other gate, and also dispel death.”

== Invasion of Yemen ==
Al-Masudi recounts a story of how Kay Kavus, after building the Tower of Babel, invaded Yemen, The king of Yemen at that time was Chammar, son of Yerâch; he marched against Keykaous and condemned him to a rigorous captivity; but his daughter, Sodâ, having fallen in love with the defeated king, softened his fate and that of his companions in misfortune, without her father's knowledge. After four years of slavery, Kay Kavus was delivered by Rostam, who arrived with 4,000 soldiers and killed Chammar. Kay Kavus then returned to Persia with Sodâ, who had charmed him.

== Analysis ==
Historian Dariush Zolfaghari has argued that the Shahnameh presents warfare not merely as a struggle over territory, but also as a struggle over the survival of Iranian cultural identity and heritage. He emphasizes both Kay Kāvus as being a key character who is depicted as a military champion and as a protector of Iranian cultural continuity. His character is partially responsible for symbolically safeguarding Persian identity, customs, and political legitimacy. The epic is seen as both a literary work and a cultural model for preserving national heritage during and after a war, with both Kay Kāvus playing a key part in this analysis.

== See also ==
- Perses (son of Andromeda and Perseus)

Preceded by Kay Qobād	Legendary Kings of the Shāhnāma; 150 years (2541–2691 after Keyumars)	Succeeded by Kay Khosrow
