= Kay Khosrow =

Legendary king of Iran and a character in Shahnameh

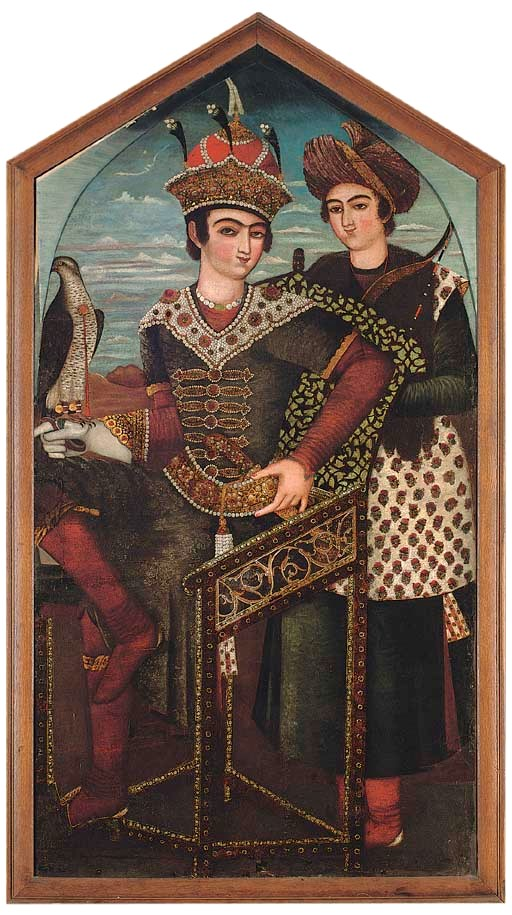
Portrait of Kay Khosrow with a falcon perched on his gloved right hand, and an attendant holding a bow standing behind him. Qajar-era oil on canvas, created by Mihr 'Ali in Isfahan, dated 1803-4

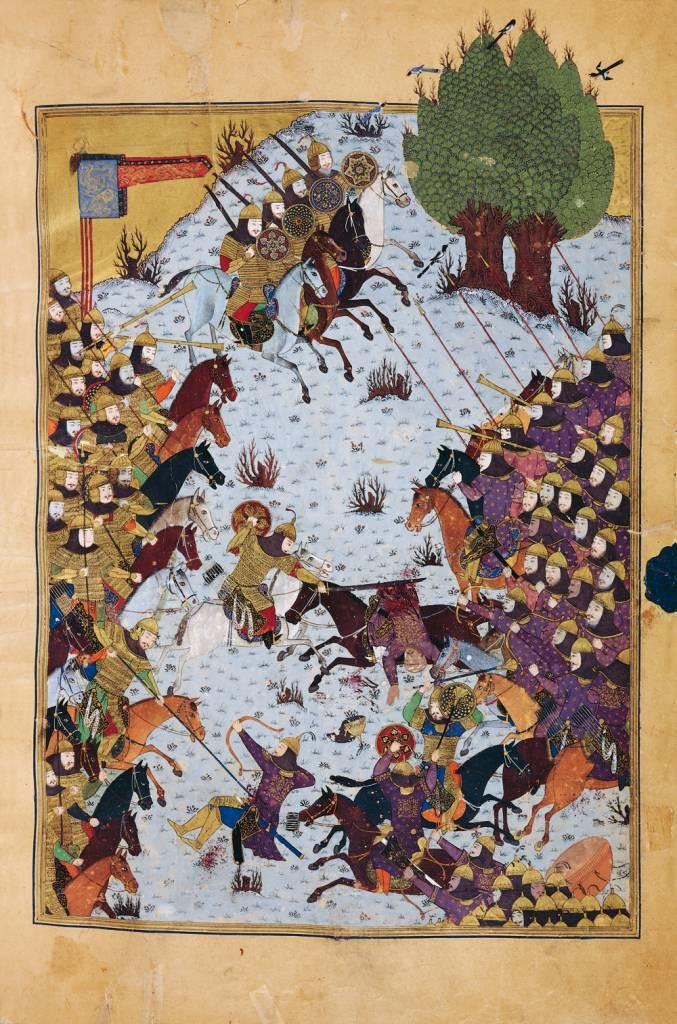
The opposing armies of Iran led by Kay Khosrow, and Turan, under the command of Afrasiab. The Bayasanghori Shâhnâmeh, made in 1430 for Prince Bayasanghor (1399–1433), a registered Heritage of UNESCO.

Kay Khosrow (Persian: کیخسرو) is a legendary king of Iran of Kayanian dynasty in Persian mythology and a character in the Persian epic book Shahnameh. He was the son of the Iranian prince Siavash who married princess Farangis of Turan while in exile. Before Kay Khosrow was born, his father was murdered in Turan by his maternal grandfather Afrasiab. Kay Khosrow was trained as a child in the desert by Piran, the wise vizier of Afrasiab. His paternal grandfather was Kay Kāvus, the legendary Shah of Iran who chose him as his heir when he returned to Iran with his mother. The name Kay Khosrow derives from Avestan Kauui Haosrauuaŋha, meaning "seer/poet who has good fame".

== In Avesta ==
In Avesta, Kay Khosrow has the epithet of arša airiianąm dax́ iiunąm, meaning "stallion of the Aryan lands". According to Avesta, Kay Khosrow had a son called Āxrūra. Kay Khosrow sacrificed for Anahita in Lake Chichast for winning a chariot race. He killed Afrasiyab in Lake Chichast as revenge for Siavash who had been killed by Aγraēraθa, son of Naru.

== In Pahlavi texts ==
In Pahlavi texts, his name is mentioned as Kay Husrōy. According to Šahrestānīhā ī Ērānšahr, he was born in the city of Samarkand, a city founded by his paternal grandfather, Kay Kavus. Kay Khosrow founded the fire of Warahrān (Persian: Bahram) in the city of Samarkand, and reinstalled another fire by the name of Karkōy in the city of Zarang, which was extinguished. According to Menog-i Khrad, Kay Khosrow ruled over Iran for 60 years, and then handed the power to the Kay Luhrasp. Kay Khosrow destroyed an idol temple by the Lake Chichast, and at the resurrection, he will collaborate with Saoshyants.

== In post-Islamic texts ==
Some Islamic era authors such as Hamza al-Isfahani and Ibn Balkhi considered him a prophet. He is the son of Siyavash and Farangis, and when his father was killed by Garsivaz, Kay Khosrow was entrusted by Piran Viseh to some shepherds. Afrasiyab constantly sees dreams and is worried about his kingship. He asks Piran to bring the child before him to test his cleverness in order to see if he can be a threat. Piran advises Kay Khosrow to answer all of the questions backward. Convinced that Khosrow is just an idiot, Afrasiyab orders Piran to send him to his mother who lives in the city of Siyavashgerd, which was founded by his father. Meanwhile, in Iran, Gudarz sees a dream, in which a Sorush tells about Kay Khosrow to him. Only Giv can bring the child back to Iran. After seven years of searching for Kay Khosrow, he finally finds him and brings him back together with his mother, Farangis. According to Al-Masʿudi, Kay Ḵhosrow conquered lands as far as China and built a city there named Kank-dez (i.e., Kang-dež), later inhabited by several Chinese kings. According to Al-Tabari, Kay Khosrow resigned as king after he had secured power, and became an ascetic, when the people asked who should replace him, Khosrow pointed at Lohrasp.

== Cup of Kay Khosrow ==
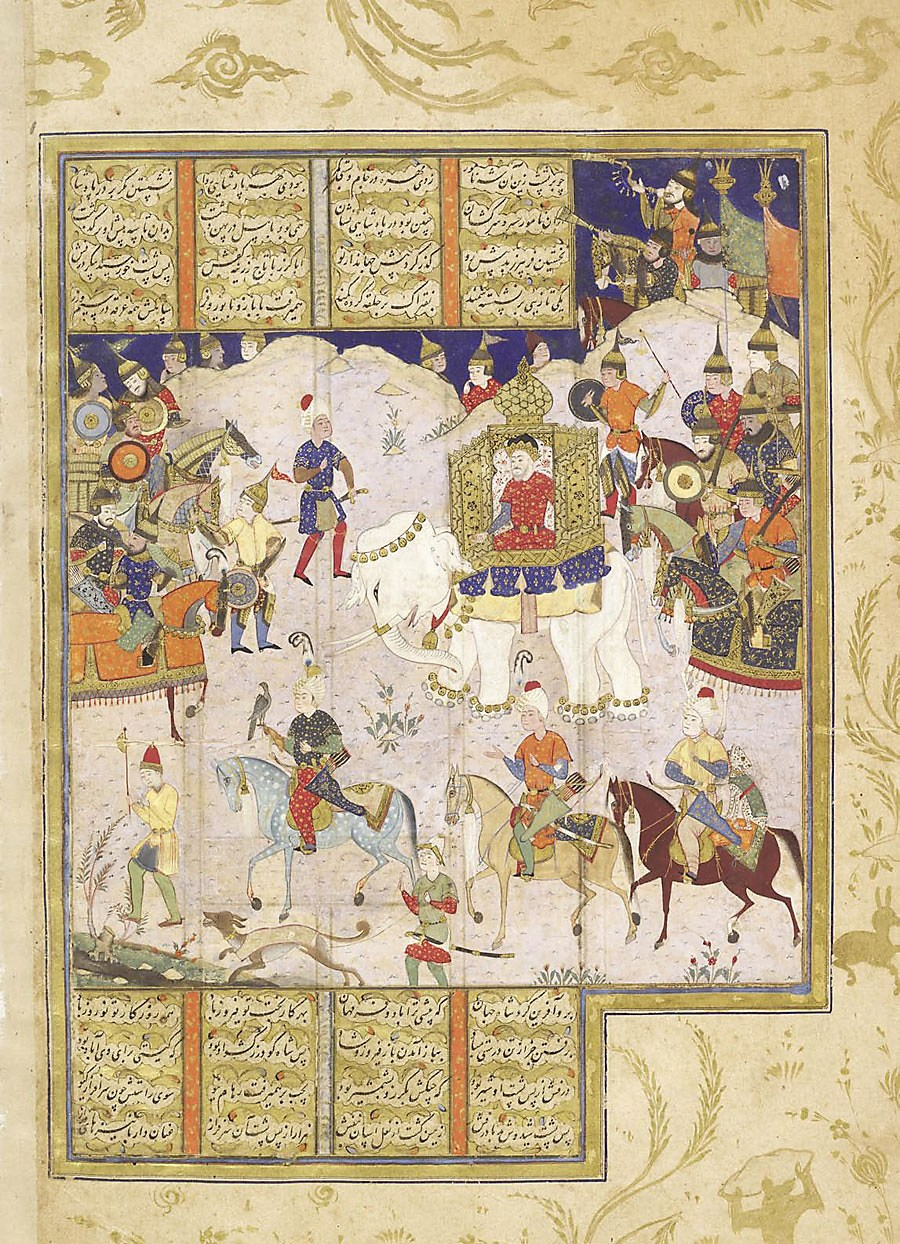
Kay Khusraw Reviews His Army

The Cup of Jamshid or, in reality, the Cup of Kay Khosrow (Cup of Djemscheed or Jaam-e Jam, or cup of Kay Khosrow in Persian: جام جم) is a cup of divination which, in Persian mythology, was long possessed by the rulers of ancient Persia. The cup has also been called Jam-e Jahan nama, Jam-e Jahan Ara, Jam-e Giti nama, and Jam-e Kay Khosrow. The latter refers to Kaei Husravah in the Avesta, and Sushravas in the Vedas. This Cup was used just once and by Kay Khosrow in his reign to find where Bizhan was, who had gone to the Turan border for hunting. Bizhan had become romantically involved with Manizheh, the daughter of Turanian king Afrasiab, after a brief encounter with her in the border of Iran and Turan. Manizheh clandestinely brought him to the palace of her father, and when Afrasiab found out he threw Bizhan into a pit and expelled Manizheh from the castle. Everyone in Iran thought that Bizhan was dead except for Kay Khosrow who saw him alive in the Cup. Kay Khosrow then sent Rostam to rescue Bizhan.

The cup ("Jām") was said to be filled with an elixir of immortality and was used in scrying. As mentioned by Ali-Akbar Dehkhoda, it was believed that one could observe all the seven heavens of the universe by looking into it (از هفت فلک در او مشاهده و معاینه کردی). It was believed to have been discovered in Persepolis in ancient times. The whole world was said to be reflected in it, and divinations within the Cup were said to reveal deep truths. Sometimes, especially in popular depictions such as The Heroic Legend of Arslan, the cup is visualized as a crystal ball. Helen Zimmern's English translation of the Shahnameh uses the term "crystal globe".

== Analysis ==
Historian Dariush Zolfaghari has argued that the Shahnameh presents warfare not merely as a struggle over territory, but also as a struggle over the survival of Iranian cultural identity and heritage. He emphasizes Kay Khosrow as being a key character who is depicted as a military champion and as a protector of Iranian cultural continuity. His character is partially responsible for symbolically safeguarding Persian identity, customs, and political legitimacy. The epic is seen as both a literary work and a cultural model for preserving national heritage during and after a war, with Kay Khosrow playing a key part in this analysis.

== See also ==
- Davazdah Rokh
- Kay Bahman
- Cyrus the Great

Preceded by Kay Kāvus	Legendary King of Iran; 60 years (2691–2751 after Keyumars)	Succeeded by Kay Lohrasp
