= Pishdadian dynasty =

Mythical Persian dynasty

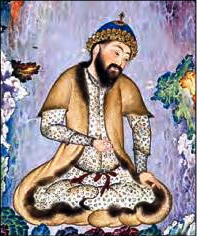
Keyumars, progenitor of the Pishdadian dynasty according to the Shahnameh.

The Pishdadian dynasty (Persian: دودمان پیشدادیان, romanized: Dudmân-e Pishdâdiyân) is a mythical line of primordial kings featured in Zoroastrian belief, Persian mythology and Iranian national history. They are presented in legend as originally rulers of the world but whose realm was eventually limited to Ērānshahr or Greater Iran. Although there are scattered references to them in the Zoroastrian scriptures—the Avesta—and later Pahlavi literature, it is through the 11th-century Iranian national epic, the Shahnameh, that the canonical form of their legends is known. From the 9th century, Muslim writers, notably Tabari, re-told many of the Pishdadian legends in prose histories and other works. The Pishdadian kings and the stories relating to them have no basis in historical fact, however.

According to the Shahnameh, the Pishdadians were the first Iranian dynasty, pre-dating the historical Achaemenids, and ruling for a period of over two thousand years. Their progenitor was Keyumars, the first human and the "Zoroastrian Adam". He was followed by his descendants who, as kings of the world, fought demons and improved the lives of humankind by introducing them to new knowledge and skills. His most renowned successor, Jamshid, established the main elements of civilization, but, as a result of his pride and hubris, was overthrown by the evil tyrant Zahhak. Following a popular insurrection against Zahhak, the throne was eventually restored to the Pishdadians. However, the next king, Fereydun, divided the world between his three sons with his youngest, Iraj, receiving Iran, the choicest portion, after whom it is named. Iraj and his successors aroused the envy of the other descendants of Fereydun, leading to a lengthy feud and series of wars which eventually caused the downfall of the dynasty. The Shahnameh tells how the Iranians, having no confidence in the last of the Pishdadians, replaced them with another mythical dynasty, the Kayanians.

Tabari repeated many of the same stories in his History, with some variations. As with many of the medieval Muslim writers, he intermixed these stories with narratives relating to Quranic figures, and stories of the prophets, to give them a distinctively Islamic perspective.

The stories of the Pishdadian kings have been politically and culturally influential in Iranian society. Both in antiquity and the Middle Ages, ruling dynasties claimed descent from them in order to be imbued with their prestige and political legitimacy. Into the modern era, the tales of the Shahnameh continue to pervade all aspects of Iranian culture and, as part of that, the Pishdadians remain central to Iranians' sense of the roots of their own history and national identity.

== Origins, etymology and sources ==
The Pishdadian kings are figures in Persian mythology, about whom a number of legends are recorded in Zoroastrian texts, including the Avesta, and in the Shahnameh, a medieval Persian poem recognised as Iran's national epic. From the 9th century, the Pishdadians also appear in Arabic prose works of Muslim writers. The overwhelming evidence is that the existence of the Pishdadian dynasty has no historical basis. The various tellings of their story nevertheless portray them as the first Iranian dynasty ruling a mythical kingdom that existed at a time before the Achaemenids, the first historical Persian dynasty. The etymology of Pishdadian (from Persian: پيشداد, pišdād) is usually thought to mean "those who first promulgated laws". However, an alternative view is that it comes from paradhata, a word from the Avesta, meaning "created before [others]" or "first created".

Timeline of the main extant sources
Source	Date	Language
Avesta	c. 1000 – 550 BCE	Avestan
Denkard	9th cent CE	Middle; Persian
Bundahishn	9th cent CE	Middle; Persian
Ayādgār ī Jāmāspīg	9th/10th cent CE	Middle; Persian
Tabari's History	Early 10th cent. CE	Arabic
Tarikhnama	962 CE	New Persian
Shahnameh	1010 CE	New Persian
Garshasp-nama	1066 CE	New Persian

The most canonical account of the mythical early kings of Iran is provided by the Shahnameh, an epic poem of the early 11th century composed by Abolqasem Ferdowsi, a Persian poet from Tus in Khorasan. Considered to be a globally significant literary masterpiece, the poem is a history of Iran from its mythic beginnings to the Muslim conquest at the end of the Sasanian period, and opens with the story of the Pishdadian kings. Ferdowsi's work was the culmination of a long tradition of oral and written prose and poetry, and the stories he drew on may reach back to Indo-European traditions pre-dating Iranian culture. He is thought to have used both oral and written sources, including, apparently, a now lost prose epic compiled in Tus in the mid-10th century, and which itself was based on a late Sasanian chronicle, also now lost, called the Xwadāy-nāmag. Additionally, Ferdowsi may well have used his own poetic imagination to add to or change the stories, although it is difficult to judge the extent to which he did this. Although Ferdowsi was a Muslim writing for a Muslim audience, the Shahnameh is seen as "non-Islamic" (albeit monotheistic) and partly reflecting a Zoroastrian perspective. (Note: However, A. C. S. Peacock has challenged the view that Ferdowsi does not draw on Islamic traditions: "…the image of Firdawsi as a passionate traditionalist seeking to preserve his country's dying culture and keeping rigorously to the traditions inherited from the Iranian forefathers is not entirely borne out.") Ferdowsi excludes Islamic cosmology and chronology from the Shahnameh and makes the pre-Islamic Persian myths the core message of the epic.

Following the Shahnameh, an Iranian tradition of writing epics about mythological heroes lasted for about 300 years. The only significant one to contain material on the Pishdadians was the Garshasp-nama, which opens with a retelling of some of the stories of the Shahnameh.

The mythical kings of the Shahnameh have parallels with characters in the much earlier Avesta, which likely reached its final form by the middle of the first millennium BCE. However, the Avesta gives only brief references to the characters involved, using different or variant names, with little detail of the myths that later find their full expression in the Shahnameh. These are mainly in the yashts or Avestan hymns. Although these references are brief, it is clear from the context and the way they are presented that they allude to stories very similar to the later, more developed, Zoroastrian tradition. Sitting between the Avesta and the Shahnameh are Middle Persian or Pahlavi Zoroastrian texts, such as the Denkard, the Bundahishn and the Ayādgār ī Jāmāspīg. Although they are nearly contemporaneous with the Shahnameh, they may embed stories and traditions from much earlier sources and provide a link with the ancient Avestan texts. They give more detail than the Avestan references on some of the stories relating to the mythic kings, but still do not provide full narratives in the manner of the Shahnameh. In some instances, the descriptions are at variance with both the Shahnameh and the Avesta.

From the 9th century CE, most Muslim "universal histories", that is histories of the world purportedly from the creation, include an account of the Pishdadian kings. The most important of these, and the one that provides the most comprehensive coverage of traditional pre-Islamic Iranian narratives – what the Iranologist Ehsan Yarshater called Iranian "national history" – is Tabari's History of the Prophets and Kings, written in Arabic during the early 10th century. His narrative intertwines an account of the mythical Persian kings with biblical stories and the prophets of Islam, and integrates the Zoroastrian myths of the Pishdadians’ conflict with evil into the concept of mankind's struggle against satanic forces. Tabari, like Ferdowsi, is thought to have included the lost Xwadāy-nāmag among the sources he used. Tabari's History was an important influence on the Muslim historiography that followed him, and the most significant subsequent Persian development of this genre was the mid-10th century Tarikhnama of Bal'ami. Ostensibly a translation of Tabari's History into Persian, in fact Bal’ami drew on other sources to substantively develop the text; for example, the account of two of the Pishdadian kings, Keyumars (Gayomard) and Jamshid, differs significantly between Bal’ami and Tabari.

== The Shahnameh and Zoroastrian tradition ==
=== Overview ===
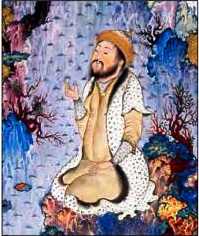
Siyamak, son of Gayomard and father of Hushang

Zoroastrian belief held that the dynasty originated with the first human, Gayomard (also known as Keyumars and called Gayomart in the Shahnameh and Gaya Maretan in the Avesta), who was brought to life by Ahura Mazda, the creator deity of Zoroastrianism.

In the Shahnameh, Gayomard is the first king of the world and, wearing animal skins and living in the mountains, he teaches humankind how to feed and dress itself and lays down the rules of kingship. During Gayomard's rule, Siyamak, his son, is killed in a battle with the evil deity, Ahriman. Ahriman is, in turn, defeated in a further battle with Gayomard and Siyamak's son, Hushang. Gayomard rules for thirty years and, on his death, is succeeded by Hushang who founds the Pishdadian dynasty.

The epic goes on to tell the story of how the Pishdadians ruled for over two millennia during which they fought demons, gave knowledge and skills to humanity, and created civilisation. However, hubris leads to them being overthrown by an evil tyrant. The throne is eventually restored to the Pishdadians, but they divide their world realm between three different branches of the royal line, creating three new kingdoms: one in the west, one in the east (Turan), and Greater Iran in the centre of the world, later equated with the Sasanian concept of Ērānshahr. This results in an ongoing feud and lengthy war between the Iranians and Turanians which ultimately causes the downfall of the Pishdadians and their replacement by a new dynasty, the Kayanians. In all, as narrated in the Shahmaneh, there are ten kings considered to be Pishdadian: Hushang, Tahmuras, Jamshid, Zahhak, Fereydun, Iraj, Manuchehr, Nowzar, Zav and Garshasp. However, Zahhak, Zav and Garshasp are unrelated to the other monarchs.

These stories are not found in the Avesta. Gaya Maretan is referenced as one of the two first living creatures, the other being a bull, without explaining how they were created. In the yashts, or hymns of the Avesta, there are scattered references to characters who subsequently figure in Shahnameh, including the Pishdadians. These are usually in the context of a brief reference to the character sacrificing to the gods in order to ask for their wishes to be granted with short descriptions of their attributes.

=== The kings ===
Further details of the Pishdadian kings, as told in the Shahnameh, are summarised below together with their equivalent antecedent characters in the Avesta and the later Pahlavi texts, principally the Denkard and the Bundahishn.

King in Shahnameh (Note: Depictions of each king are miniatures from the 16th-century illustrated manuscript, the Shahnameh of Shah Tahmasp, except that of Fereydun, which is from the Tarjumah-i Shâhnâmah, an early 17th-century Ottoman manuscript, and those of Zav and Garshasp, which are from the 14th-century Ilkhanate manuscript known as the Great Mongol Shahnameh.)	Pahlavi texts	Avestan antecedent
Hushang becomes king after defeating the demons. He goes on to discover how to make fire in a fortuitous accident and introduces to humankind metal-work, irrigation, agriculture, animal husbandry and hunting. He dies peacefully and is remembered for transforming the existence of humanity for the better.	In the Bundahishn, Hoshang, the founder of the Pishdadian dynasty, was the grandson of the first man Mashya, who in turn was the son of Gayomard. The three sacred fires, or Atar, of ancient Iran (Farnbag, Gushnasp and Burzin Mihr) were established by Hushang.	In the Avesta, Hushang is Haoshyangha, the paradhata, "the one who preceded all others". He ruled over all gods and men in the seven continents. He was given the gift of being able to "strike down" two-thirds of the "old" gods. In the yashts, it is Haoshyangha who is the first king rather than Gayomard/Gaya Maretan.
Tahmuras, the son of Hushang, defeated the evil deity Ahriman and expanded the range of humanity's arts and skills, including weaving and writing. These he learnt from both good spirits and demons. He was given the epithet of "demon-binder" because of his ability to dominate evil spirits, and he would spare the life of a demon if they gave him the secrets of an art or skill.	According to the Bundahishn, Tahmuraf was the brother of Jam (that is, Jamshid). He was swallowed by Ahriman. Jam distracted Ahriman with the two things that Ahriman most enjoyed: singing and offering to sodomize him. When distracted, Jamshid reached into his stomach and pulled Tamuraf out.	Tahmuras is called Takhma Urupa in the Avesta, and rules the world including all demons, wizards and witches. He had a similar position to Haoshyangha but in addition "rode the Evil Spirit changed into the form of a horse for three hundred years around both borders of the earth". The "Evil Spirit" is Ahriman himself (also called Angra Mainyu).
Jamshid, the son of Tahmuras, ruled for 700 years. Jamshid established the main elements of Iranian civilization and provided his people with their weapons, clothing and the structure of Iranian society. However, his resulting pride and arrogance brought him divine displeasure leading to his overthrow by the evil Zahhak. Jamshid went into exile, but was eventually captured and executed on Zahhak's orders.	In the Pahlavi literature, Jam was equivalent to the Avestan Yima but was the subject of additional myths, including how the festival of Nowruz, the Zoroastrian New Year's Day, was established in commemoration of Jam's accession to the throne; myths related to his sisters Shahrnāz and Arnavāz; and the introduction of Dahāg as a character. In the Bundahishn, Dahāg helped Spitiyura cut Jam into two.	The Avestan antecedent of Jamshid is Yima, who was chosen by Ahura Mazda to be the first king of the earth. After sacrificing to the gods, his wish to have the power to make mortals immortal and to ameliorate the climate was granted. His subsequent hubris resulted in the loss of his throne and he was condemned to wander the earth until he was cut in half by a character named Spitiyura.
Zahhak came from Arabia. He was the son of Merdas, a good king whom he killed, ruling in his place as an evil tyrant. As a mark of evil, he had serpents growing from his shoulders. After usurping Jamshid's throne as well, Zahhak ruled for 1,000 years until he was overthrown in a popular insurrection and killed by the rightful king, Fereydun.	In the Denkard, Dahāg the dragon is imprisoned by Thraetona in a cave on Mount Damavand until the end of the world when he will be killed by Garshasp.	Zahhak's origins are found in Azhi Dahaka of the Avesta, a dragon who sacrificed to the gods so that it could be granted the power to de-populate the earth. It is described as "three-jawed and triple-headed, six-eyed with a thousand powers and of mighty strength". It is ultimately killed by Thraetona.
Fereydun was the son of Abtin, a descendant of Jamshid. He is associated with magic, for example transforming himself into a dragon to test his sons’ bravery. Having ruled 500 years, Fereydun divided his kingdom between his three sons. Salm received the lands of the west, Rûm; the lands of the east, Turan, were given to Tur; and Iran, the lands in the middle of the world, became the realm of Iraj.	In the Bundahishn, the story of Ferētōn approximates that of Fereydun and his three sons. The Denkard contains the story of "Ferētōn, the lord of Xvaniras" who defeats Azhi Dahaka and divides his lands between his three sons Salm, Tōč, and Ērič. Later, Manuščihr "king of Iran and descendant of Ērič" succeeds Ferētōn. This is said to preserve a summary of a lost part of the Avesta.	Thraetona is the Avestan antecedent of Fereydun, and is referred to with the epithet Athbiiani ("of the house of Athbiia"). He was both a warrior and a physician, and was renowned for his defeat of the dragon Azhi Dahaka. He was attributed with magical powers.
Īraj was the youngest son of Fereydun. His father determined that Iraj was "alone worthy of praise" among his sons and gave him the choicest realm, which included Iran. Iran was named after him as a result. The three brothers ruled "for a long time" but Salm and Tur never stopped resenting the favour shown Iraj and, with Salm's encouragement, Tur eventually murdered him. Fereydun, who was still alive, prayed for vengeance and, as a result, Manuchehr, a grandson of Iraj, killed Salm and Tur. Fereydun then abdicated in Manuchehr's favour.	In the Ayādgār ī Jāmāspīg, Ferētōn's (Fereydun's) division of the world was based on the character of each of his sons: each was given a kingdom that reflected their values. Ērič (Iraj), who prized law and religion, was given Eranshahr as a result. He was also given Ferētōn's crown and his descendants were given sovereignty over those of his brothers. His envious brother's killed him, however.	Iraj appears as Airyu in the Avesta, but is only mentioned in the context of being the father of Manuschitra (Manuchehr). There is also an allusion to the story of the division of the world between the three brothers as there is a reference to the lands inherited by Salm in a related passage.
Manuchehr was the grandson of Iraj through his mother, and his father was a nephew of Fereydun. During his reign, Afrasiab became king of Turan, and invaded and occupied Iran. As part of the peace settlement, Afrasiab was tricked into agreeing to a boundary between the two realms which was unexpectedly favourable to Manuchehr.	In the Bundahishn, Manushchihr was a descendant of Ērič through his daughter. When he came of age he avenged Ērič's murder by killing Ērič's brothers. He then becomes king and rules for a 120 years. He discovers the source of the Euphrates and also constructs canals for irrigation.	Manuchehr is called Manushchitra in the Avesta. He is invoked in the Farvardin Yasht with the words "We worship the fravashi (Note: As presented in the Farvardin Yasht, the fravashis, including the fravashi of Manuschitra, are the souls of dead heroes who exist as powerful supernatural beings inhabiting the stratosphere protecting those who worship them.) of the holy Manushchithra, the son of Airyu". In another hymn, the Zamyad Yasht, reference is made to Manushchitra being born on the second mountain to rise up from the earth, called Manusha.
Nowzar succeeds his father, Manuchehr, on his death. However, Nowzar is weak and incompetent and alienates both his own government and the ordinary people. Taking advantage of the confusion in Nowzar's kingdom, Afrasiab invades, defeats the Iranians and captures and kills Nowzar.	In the Pahlavi texts (for example the Bundahishn), Manushchihr's son is named Nōḏar. However, he never becomes king and is killed during the reign of his father by Afrasiab.	In the Avesta, Nowzar's name only appears in the form of the patronymic Naotara, in reference, in two yashts, to Nowzar's descendants.
Zav, a member of the nobility unrelated to Nowzar, (Note: According to the Shahnameh, Zav is the son of Tahmasp and unrelated to the other Pishdadians.) is chosen to ascend the throne by the court nobles. In so doing they pass over Nowzar's sons, whom they consider unsuitable. Zaav, however, fails to restore the power of the Iranian kingdom.	He is referred to as Auzobo "the Tuhmaspian" in the Bundahishn, where he is described as a grandson of Nowzar. There is also a story that he saved from drowning Kay Qobad, who subsequently became a Kayanian king, when the latter was a child.	Zav is called Uzava in the Avesta. He is invoked in the Farvardin Yasht.
Garshasp is Zav's son, who succeeds him on Zav's death. (Note: Garshasp is omitted from the older and more authentic Shahnameh manuscripts. Therefore he may be a spurious later interpolation in the poem.) He, too, is unable to restore the realm's fortunes and, on his death, the throne is vacant and the Pishdadian era comes to an end. The Iranian leaders select as their king Kay Qobad, a descendant of Fereydun, who founds a new dynasty: the Kayanians. In fact, the Shahmaneh has two characters named Garshasp, the other being a warrior in the time of Fereydun who more closely matches the Avestan Karesespa. It is likely that both have their origins in Karesespa, but the development of two characters of that name was a result, partly, of confusion.	In the Bundahishn, Karshasp is not identified as a king. He is only mentioned after a reference to the Kayanian king Kay Khosrow. The Denkard does describe him as a king but lists him between the reigns of the Kayanian kings Kay Kawad and Kay Kāvus.	Keresespa is the Avestan form of the name Garshasp. In the yashts, Keresespa is a mighty warrior best known for dragon-slaying.

== Tabari and the Muslim narratives ==
Unlike Ferdowsi, the other Muslim authors who include the Persian mythic kings in their histories, sought to adapt the stories to fit Islamic chronology and thinking. Tabari presents several lines of descent of pre-Islamic Persians and claims a number of ways that they may be related or intertwined with the lines of Islamic prophets or other figures from the Quran. One of these lines is the Pishdadian dynasty. In the following summary of that narrative, the names of the characters used by Tabari have been adopted.

Variants of names (Note: Transliteration of the Arabic names used by Tabari follows the transliterations in the translations of Tabari by Rosenthal (1989) and Brinner (1987) respectively. See Bibliography below.)
Shahnameh	Tabari's equivalent
Gayomart	Jayumart
Hushang	Oshahanj
Tahmuras	Tahmurath
Jamshid	Jam al-Shidh
Zahhak	Al-Dahhak or Biswarasb
Fereydun	Afaridhun
Iraj	Iraj
Manuchehr	Manushihr
Zav	Zaw
Afrasiab	Farasiat or Frasiab (Note: Brinner in his translation of Tabari notes "text has Frasyat (Afrasyab, Frasyab)" and he uses Frasiyab in his translation.)

=== The first Pishdadian kings and the conflict with Iblis ===
In most Muslim narratives, the first two kings were Jayumart and his grandson Oshahanj, although some count Oshahanj as the first king, likely reflecting the position of late Sasanian sources. Tabari says that "most Persian scholars assume" that Jayumart is Adam, others that he is the son of Adam and Eve, others again "have many diverse statements", and non-Persians say he is one of a number of other biblical figures (Gomer, Japheth or Noah). He also says that he was a lord in Tabaristan and Fars and that "everyone agrees" that he was the "father" of the Persians. In later life he took the name "Adam" and became a tyrant. His son and daughter, Mari and Mariyanah were the ancestors of kings. According to Tabari, his successor, Oshahanj, was the first king to introduce laws and rule with justice and fairness. Until his rule, humans lived on fruit and clothed themselves with leaves. He built them homes, and taught them to eat meat, use animal skins for clothing, cut trees, mine and work metals and cultivate the land.

A theme of the Muslim writers is the Pishdadian kings' struggle with Iblis and the demons. For Bal'ami, the conflict begins with Jayumart and is positioned as a blood feud. Jayumart flees Mesopotamia, where he was in a dispute with the rest of his family, and settles on Mount Damavand. There he encounters demons living in the region. A conflict ensues and he defeats them, but the demons murder Jayumart's son Pashang and, in revenge, Jayumart kills some of those involved in killing his son. The other demons are forced to build the city of Balkh, "the oldest city of the world's cities".

For Tabari, the conflict begins in Oshahanj's reign and its origins are unclear:

The Persians say...that he [Oshahanj] meant (to inflict) punishment upon and revenge upon rebellious human beings and Satans. Again they mention that he subdued Iblis and his armies and forbade them to mix with human beings. Writing a document on a white sheet, he imposed covenants upon them enjoining them not to confront any human being...They further mention that Iblis and his armies rejoiced at the death of Oshahanj. This was because his death enabled them to enter the dwellings of the children of Adam...

Tabari reports that "the Persians say" that Oshahanj's successor was Tahmurath. He adds that there are differences of opinion on Tahmurath's exact pedigree, although both the pedigrees that he mentions claim that Tahmurath's ultimate ancestor was Oshahanj. Tabari makes brief mention of the continuing struggle with the demons in Tahmurath's reign, and notes that "God gave him so much power that Iblis and his Satans were submissive to him". Other Muslim historians gave Tahmurath the title Divband or Demon-binder, and added a number of mythological events to his story. For example, Biruni relates that Tahmarath was warned of the Flood 231 years before it happened.

=== From Jam al-Shidh to Zaw: al-Dahhak and war with the Turks ===
Tabari says that, according to the "Persian scholars", Tahmurath was succeeded by his brother's son, Jam al-Shidh. Muslim authors typically attribute meanings to al-shidh such as "shine" or "radiance" and, in one instance, that his full name, including Jam, meant "brightness of the moon". Tabari says that his soubriquet was given to him "because of his beauty". Tabari goes on to relate that "Persian scholars" claim that Jam al-Shidh initiated the manufacture of weaponry, iron tools, cloth and other materials, and created the four classes of society: soldiers, religious scholars, secretaries, artisans and cultivators. (Note: Tabari also mentions servants as a class, but it is unclear how this fits with the statement that there were four classes. A later writer, Ibn al-Athir, repeats Tabari's story but says that servants are drawn for each of the other four classes. Bal'ami, on the other hand, includes secretaries in the second class with religious scholars to keep the number to four.) He then subdued the demons and "forced them to cut stones and rocks from the mountains". However, Iblis persuades him that he is a god. As a consequence, Jam al-Shidh then requires his subjects to worship him, which prompts his overthrow and execution. Tabari is the only author that overtly claims that Jam al-Shidh's downfall was because he was tricked by Iblis.

Al-Dahhak, who Tabari says the Persians call Biswarasb, then seizes power. He was a descendant of Jayumart and a "wicked sorcerer" who ruled for a thousand years after Jam al-Shidh, "displaying tyranny and oppression". Eventually, Kabi initiates an uprising against al-Dahhak. The latter is defeated in battle by Afaridhoun, a descendant of Jam, who becomes king and imprisons Al-dahhak on Mount Damavand. According to Tabari, "some Magians claim that he took al-Dahhak captive and imprisoned him in the mountains, putting a group of jinn in charge of him; others assert that he killed him".

The Muslim historians – including Tabari, Bal’ami, Tha’alebi, and Dinavari – give the same story, in essence, as the Shahnameh of Fereydoun's (Afaridhoun's) division of his realm between his three sons and the subsequent murder of Iraj, his favourite son. In the case of Tabari, Afaridhoun gives the lands of the Turks, Khazars and China to Tuj; Rum, the lands of the Slavs and Georgia are allocated to Sarm; and Ērānshahr, the "centre of the World", becomes the domain of Iraj.

Tabari says that Sarm and Tuj ruled the earth for 300 years after they had killed their brother. Manushihr, a descendant of Iraj, becomes king and avenges Iraj's murder, by killing Sarm and Tuj. Manushihr's rule was "described as just and generous". Towards the end of his reign, he is attacked by Frasiyab, king of Turan (that is of the Turks) and a descendant of Tuj. An agreement is made whereby the boundary between their realms is set by having an Iranian archer shoot an arrow from a mountain and where it lands will form the frontier. The arrow landed near Balkh at the Oxus river, which becomes the boundary between the Iranians and the Turks.

Following Manushihr's death, Tabari says that Frasiyab conquered and ruled over Persia until Zaw, a descendant of Manushihr, is chosen as king. Zaw drives out Frasiyab and was "praised for his rule and behaved well towards his subjects". He was succeeded by Kayqubadh (Kay Qobod) the first of the Kayanian line of kings.

== Significance ==
In order to be imbued with political legitimacy, several ancient and medieval Iranian dynasties claimed descent from the Pishdadians. Prior to the Muslim conquest of Persia, this included the Sasanians, who claimed descent from both the Pishdadians and the Kayanians. Even Muslim dynasties after the conquest claimed Pishdadian descent, for example the Samanids. Late medieval kings and rulers of Iran were highly influenced by the stories of the mythic kings of the Shahnameh. The values and behaviours attributed to the Pishdadians and the other mythic kings and heroes were seen as a "mirror for princes". Rulers continued to commission lavishly illustrated prestigious manuscripts of the work, such as the Shahnameh of Shah Tahasp or the Great Mongol Shahnameh as even possession of fine copies of the stories enabled a ruler to accrue political legitimacy.

The Shahnameh and its legends have played a key role in the cultural identity of the peoples of Iran, Afghanistan and Tajikistan. The influence of its mythical stories on the culture and beliefs of Iranians has been immense, pervading Iranian education, literature and society. In particular, and despite the evidence of archaeology and modern historical scholarship, the Pishdadian dynasty and its equally mythical successor, the Kayanians, are at the core of Persian people's perspective of Iran's history and informs their sense of national identity. This is reflected in the fact that Iranians persist in calling Persepolis, the site of the Achaemenid capital, by its mythological name, Takht-e Jamshid (the Throne of Jamshid).

== Bibliography ==
=== Translations of original sources ===
- Bundahishn. The Sacred Books of the East. Vol. 5: Pahlavi Texts. Translated by West, Edward William. Clarendon Press. 1880 [original text: 9th century CE]. pp. 1–152.
- Farvardin Yasht. The Sacred Books of the East. Vol. 23: The Zend-Avesta Pt. 2, The Sirozas, Yasts and Nyayis. Translated by Darmesteter, James. Clarendon Press. 1883 [original text: prior to mid-1st millennium BCE]. pp. 178–230.
- Ferdowsi, Abolqasem (2007) [original text: c. 1010 CE]. The Shahnameh: The Persian Book of Kings. Translated by Davis, Dick. Penguin Books. ISBN 978-0-14-310832-0.
- Tabari, Muhammad ibn Jarir ibn Yazid (1989) [original text: early 10th century]. "From the Creation to the Flood". History. Vol. 1. Translated by Rosenthal, Franz. State University of New York Press. ISBN 978-0-88706-563-7.
- Tabari, Muhammad ibn Jarir ibn Yazid (1987) [original text: early 10th century]. "Prophets and Patriarchs". History. Vol. 2. Translated by Brinner, William M. State University of New York Press. ISBN 978-0-88706-313-8.
- Tabari, Muhammad ibn Jarir ibn Yazid (1991) [original text: early 10th century]. "The Children of Israel". History. Vol. 3. Translated by Brinner, William M. State University of New York Press. ISBN 978-0-79140-688-5.

=== Secondary works cited ===
- Abdullaev, Kamoludin (2018). Historical Dictionary of Tajikistan. Rowman & Littlefield. ISBN 978-1-5381-0252-7.
- Agostini, Domenico (2013). Ayādgār ī Jāmāspīg: Un texte eschatologique zoroastrien. Gregorian and Biblical Press. ISBN 978-88-7653-353-2.
- Ansari, Ali M. (2012). The Politics of Nationalism in Modern Iran. Cambridge University Press. ISBN 978-0-521-86762-7.
- Areshian, Gregory E. (2013). "Sasanian Imperialism and the Shaping of Armenian Identity: Interdisciplinary Verification and Ambivalence of Empire–Nation Relationship". In Areshian, Gregory E. (ed.). Empires and Diversity: On the Crossroads of Archaeology, Anthropology, and History. Cotsen Institute of Archaeology Press. ISBN 978-0-917956-09-6.
- BeDuhn, Jason (2014). "Iranian Epic in the Chester Beatty Kephalaia". In Gardner, Iain; BeDuhn, Jason; Dilley, Paul (eds.). Mani at the Court of the Persian Kings: Studies on the Chester Beatty Kephalaia Codex. Brill. ISBN 978-90-04-23470-3.
- Boyce, Mary (1987). "Ayādgār ī Jāmāspīg". In Yarshater, Ehsan (ed.). Encyclopædia Iranica. Vol. III/2: Awāʾel al-maqālāt–Azerbaijan IV. London and New York: Routledge & Kegan Paul. ISBN 978-0-71009-114-7.
- Boyce, Mary (2000). "Fravaši". In Yarshater, Ehsan (ed.). Encyclopædia Iranica. Vol. X/2: Forūḡī–Fruit. London and New York: Routledge & Kegan Paul. ISBN 978-0-933273-41-2.
- Bosworth, C. E. (1983). "The Persian impact on Arabic literature". In Beeston, A.F.L.; et al. (eds.). Arabic Literature to the End of the Umayyad Period. Cambridge University Press. ISBN 978-0-521-24015-4.
- Brinner, William M. (1987). "Translator's notes". Tabari's History. By Muhammad al-Tabari. Vol. 2 Prophets and Patriarchs. Translated by Brinner, William M. State University of New York Press. ISBN 978-0-88706-313-8.
- Brinner, William M. (1991). "Translator's notes". Tabari's History. By Muhammad al-Tabari. Vol. 3 The Children of Israel. Translated by Brinner, William M. State University of New York Press. ISBN 978-0-79140-688-5.
- Brookshaw, Dominic Parviz (2020). Hafiz and His Contemporaries: Poetry, Performance and Patronage in Fourteenth Century Iran. Bloomsbury. ISBN 978-0-7556-3834-5.
- Cosman, Madeleine Pelner; Jones, Linda Gale (2008). Handbook to Life in the Medieval World. Vol. 3. Infobase Publishing. ISBN 978-0-8160-4887-8.
- Darmesteter, James (1883). "Translator's notes". The Sacred Books of the East. By ancient Zoroastrian authors. Vol. 23: The Zend-Avesta Pt. 2, The Sirozas, Yasts and Nyayis. Translated by James, Damesteter. Clarendon Press.
- Daniel, Elton L. (2012). "The Rise and Development of Persian Historiography". In Melville, Charles (ed.). A History of Persian Literature. Vol. 10 Persian Historiography. Bloomsbury. ISBN 978-0-85772-359-8.
- Davaran, Fereshteh (2010). Continuity in Iranian Identity: Resilience of a Cultural Heritage. Routledge. ISBN 978-0-415-48104-5.
- Davidson, Olga M. (2009). "Persian/Iranian Epic". In Foley, John Miles Foley (ed.). A Companion to Ancient Epic. Wiley. ISBN 978-1-4051-8838-8.
- Davidson, Olga M. (2019). Poet and Hero in the Persian Book of Kings. Cornell University Press. ISBN 978-1-5017-3397-0.
- Davis, Richard (2006). "Epics, Persian". In Meri, Josef W. (ed.). Medieval Islamic Civilization: An Encyclopedia. Vol. 1. Routledge. ISBN 978-0-415-96691-7.
- Davis, Dick (2007). Introduction. The Shahnameh: The Persian Book of Kings. By Abolqasem Ferdowsi. Penguin Books. ISBN 978-0-14-310832-0.
- de Blois, François (2000). "Garšāsp-Nāma". In Yarshater, Ehsan (ed.). Encyclopædia Iranica. Vol. X/3: Fruit–Gāvbāzī. London and New York: Routledge & Kegan Paul. ISBN 978-0-933273-47-4.
- Essa, Ahmed (2010). Studies in Islamic Civilization: The Muslim Contribution to the Renaissance. International Institute of Islamic Thought. ISBN 978-1-56564-351-2.
- Fischer, Michael M. J. (2004). Mute Dreams, Blind Owls, and Dispersed Knowledges: Persian Poesis in the Transnational Circuitry. Duke University Press. ISBN 978-0-8223-8551-6.
- Frye, Richard N. (1996) [1st published 1965, University of Oklahoma Press]. Bukhara: The Medieval Achievement. Mazda Publishers. ISBN 978-1-56859-048-6.
- Garthwaite, Gene R. (2005). The Persians. Blackwell Publishing. ISBN 978-1-4051-5680-6.
- Grigor, Talinn (2021). The Persian Revival: The Imperialism of the Copy in Iranian and Parsi Architecture. Penn State University Press. ISBN 978-0-271-08968-3.
- Hogan, Patrick Colm (2003). The Mind and Its Stories: Narrative Universals and Human Emotion. Cambridge University Press. ISBN 978-1-139-44070-7.
- Kamola, Stefan (2019). Making Mongol History: Rashid Al-Din and the "Jami' Al-Tawarikh". Edinburgh University Press. ISBN 978-1-4744-2142-3.
- Khalegi-Motlagh, Djalal (1983). "Abu Mansur Mamari". In Yarshater, Ehsan (ed.). Encyclopædia Iranica. Vol. I/4: Abū Manṣūr Heravı̄–Adat. London and New York: Routledge & Kegan Paul. ISBN 978-0-71009-093-5.
- Khalegi-Motlagh, Djalal (1999). "Ferdowsi, Abu'l-Qasem i. Life". In Yarshater, Ehsan (ed.). Encyclopædia Iranica. Vol. IX/5: Fauna III–Festivals VIII. London and New York: Routledge & Kegan Paul. ISBN 978-0-933273-33-7.
- Khatchadourian, Lori (2016). Imperial Matter: Ancient Persia and the Archaeology of Empires. University of California Press. ISBN 978-0-520-96495-2.
- Kia, Mehrdad (2016). The Persian Empire: A Historical Encyclopedia. Vol. 2. ABC-CLIO. ISBN 978-1-61069-391-2.
- Lasman, Sam (2021). "Otherworld Literature:Parahuman Pasts in Classical Persian Historiography and Epic". In Vafa, Amirhossein; Abedinifard, Mostafa; Azadibougar, Omid (eds.). Persian Literature as World Literature. Bloomsbury Publishing. ISBN 978-1-5013-5422-9.
- Leoni, Francesca (2008). "The Shahnama of Shah Tahmasp". Heilbrunn Timeline of Art History. The Metropolitan Museum of Art, New York.
- Lewis, Franklin (2013). "Shahnama". In Böwering, Gerhard; Crone, Patricia; Mirza, Mahan (eds.). The Princeton Encyclopedia of Islamic Political Thought. Princeton University Press. ISBN 978-0-691-13484-0.
- Lorentz, John H. (2007). The A to Z of Iran. Scarecrow Press. ISBN 978-0-8108-7638-5.
- Marlow, Louise (2002). Hierarchy and Egalitarianism in Islamic Thought. Cambridge University Press. ISBN 978-0-521-89428-9.
- Nahvandi, Afsaneh (2009). "Cultural Mythology and Global Leadership in Iran". In Wong-MingJi, Diana J.; Kessler, Eric H. (eds.). Cultural Mythology and Global Leadership. Edward Elgar. ISBN 978-1-84844-738-7.
- Payne, Ricahard (2012). "Avoiding Ethnicity: Uses of the Ancient Past in Late Sasanian Northern Mesopotamia". In Pohl, Walter; Clemens, Gantner; Payne, Richard (eds.). Visions of Community in the Post-Roman World: The West, Byzantium and the Islamic World, 300–1100. Routledge. ISBN 978-1-4094-2709-4.
- Peacock, A.C.S. (2011). "Early Persian Historians and the Pre-Islamic Heritage of Iran". In Herzig, Edmund; Stewart, Sarah (eds.). Early Islamic Iran. Bloomsbury Publishing. ISBN 978-1-78673-446-4.
- Peacock, A.C.S (2018). "Firdawsi's Shahnama in its Ghaznavid context" (PDF). Iran. 56 (1): 2–12. doi:10.1080/05786967.2018.1426195. hdl:10023/18185. S2CID 194072788.
- Puhvel, Jaan (1990). "The Iranian Book of Kings: A Comparativistic View". In Honko, Lauri (ed.). Religion, Myth, and Folklore in the World's Epics: The Kalevala and Its Predecessors. Mouton de Gruyter. ISBN 978-3-11-012253-4.
- Quinn, Sholeh A. (2020). Persian Historiography Across Empires: The Ottomans, Safavids, and Mughals. Cambridge University Press. ISBN 978-1-108-84221-1.
- Rubanovich, Julia (2012). "Tracking the Shahnama Tradition in Medieval Persian Folk Prose". In Melville, Charles; Van Den Berg, Gabrielle (eds.). Shahnama Studies II: The Reception of Firdausi's "Shahnama". BRILL. ISBN 978-90-04-21127-8.
- Savant, Sarah Bowen (2013). The New Muslims of Post-Conquest Iran: Tradition, Memory, and Conversion. Cambridge University Press. ISBN 978-1-107-01408-4.
- Skjærvø, Prods Oktor (2008). "Jamšid i. Myth of Jamšid". In Yarshater, Ehsan (ed.). Encyclopædia Iranica. Vol. XIV/5: Jamalzadeh, Mohammad-Ali II. Work–Japan IV. Iranians in Japan. London and New York: Routledge & Kegan Paul. ISBN 978-1-934283-06-6.
- Skjærvø, Prods Oktor (2011). The Spirit of Zoroastrianism. Yale University Press. ISBN 978-0-300-17035-1.
- Shahbazi, A. Shapur (2004). "Iraj". In Yarshater, Ehsan (ed.). Encyclopædia Iranica. Vol. XIII/2: Industrialization II–Iran II. London and New York: Routledge & Kegan Paul. ISBN 978-0-933273-86-3.
- Shiran, Parisa (2017). "Literary History as National History: The Sufi Tradition in Iranian Culture and Identity". In Pascal, Ana-Maria (ed.). Multiculturalism and the Convergence of Faith and Practical Wisdom in Modern Society. IGI Global. ISBN 978-1-5225-1956-0.
- Subtelny, Maria (2013). "Between Persian Legend and Saminid orthodoxy: accounts about Gayumarth in Bal'ami's Tarikhnama". In Peacock, A.C.S; Abdullaeva, Firuza; Hillenbrand, Robert (eds.). Ferdowsi, the Mongols and the History of Iran: Art, Literature and Culture from Early Islam to Qajar Persia. Bloomsbury. ISBN 978-1-78672-465-6.
- Tafazzoli, Ahmad (1999). "Feredun". In Yarshater, Ehsan (ed.). Encyclopædia Iranica. Vol. IX/5: Fauna III–Festivals VIII. London and New York: Routledge & Kegan Paul. ISBN 978-0-933273-33-7.
- West, Edward William (1880). "Translator's notes". The Sacred Books of the East. By various medieval Zoroastrian authors. Vol. 5: Pahlavi Texts. Translated by West, Edward William. Clarendon Press.
- Williams, Alan (2001). "Demons in Zoroastrianism". In Leaman, Oliver (ed.). Encyclopedia of Asian Philosophy. Routledge. ISBN 978-0-415-17281-3.
- Yarshater, Ehsan (1983). "Chapter 10b Iranian National History". In Yarshater, Ehsan (ed.). The Cambridge History of Iran. Vol. 3(1) The Seleucid, Parthian and Sasanian Periods. Cambridge University Press. ISBN 978-0-521-20092-9.
- Yarshater, Ehsan (1984). "Afrasiab". In Yarshater, Ehsan (ed.). Encyclopædia Iranica. Vol. I/6: Afghanistan–Ahriman. London and New York: Routledge & Kegan Paul. ISBN 978-0-71009-095-9.
- Yarshater, Ehsan (2004). "Iran iii. Traditional History". In Yarshater, Ehsan (ed.). Encyclopædia Iranica. Vol. XIII/3: Iran II. Iranian history–Iran V. Peoples of Iran. London and New York: Routledge & Kegan Paul. ISBN 978-0-933273-89-4.
- Zutphen, Marjolijn van (2014). Farāmarz, the Sistāni Hero: Texts and Traditions of the Farāmarznāme and the Persian Epic Cycle. Brill. ISBN 978-90-04-26826-5.
