= Turya (Avesta) =

Ethnic group from the early history of the Iranian peoples

Turanians Turya
- People
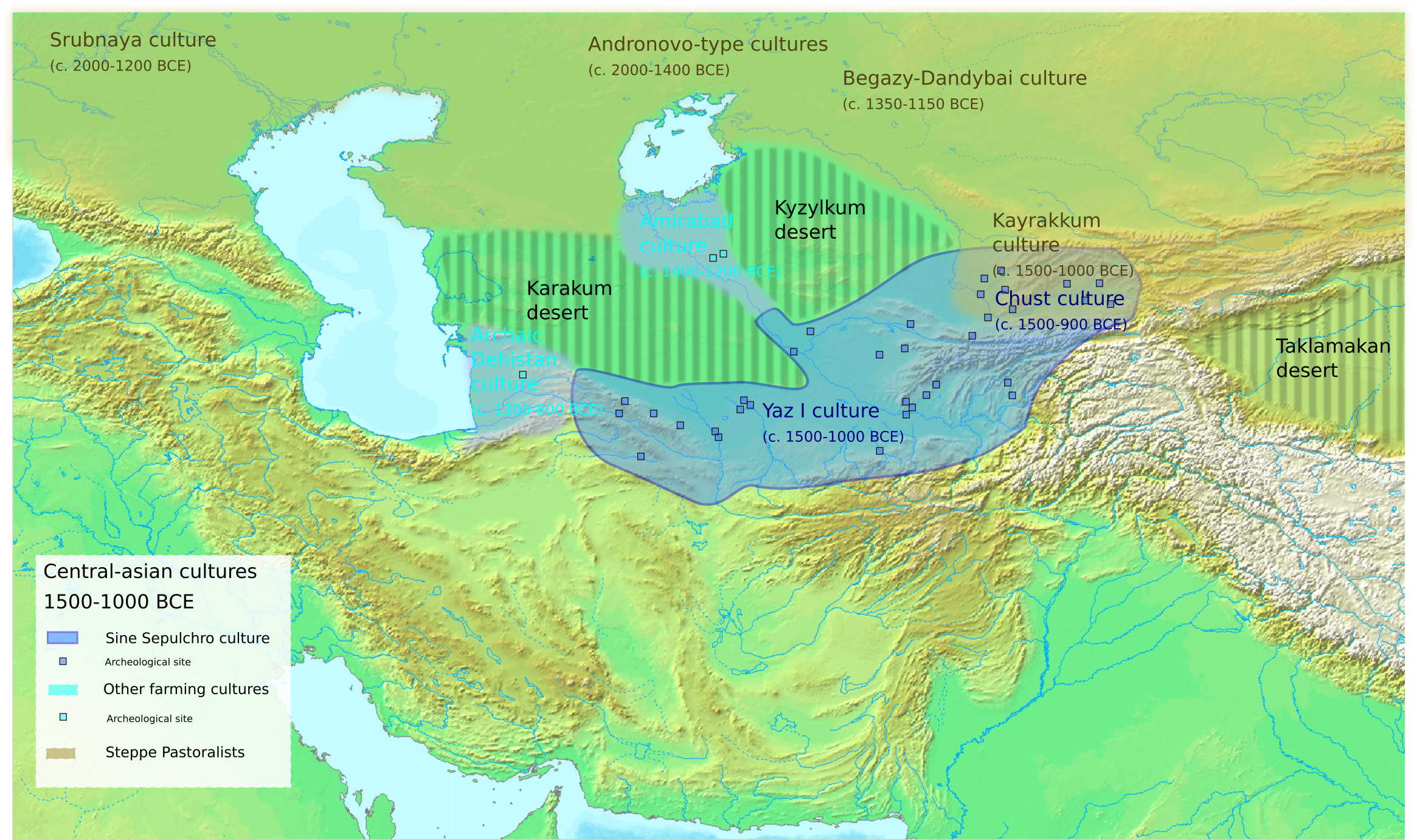
- Archeological cultures in Turan during 1500-1000 BCE
- Ethnicity: Iranic
- Location: Turan
- Language: Old Iranic
- Religion: Ancient Iranian religion; Mazdaism

Turya or Turanian (Avestan: 𐬙𐬏𐬌𐬭𐬌𐬌𐬀, romanized: tūriia) is the ethnonym of a group mentioned in the Avesta, i.e., the collection of sacred texts of Zoroastrianism. In those texts, the Turyas closely interact with the Aryas, i.e. the early Iranians. Their identity is unknown but they are assumed to have been Iranic horse nomads from the Eurasian steppe.

Like the ethnonym Iranian, which is derived from Iran, the modern term Turanian is a back formation from the toponym Turan. Both Turan and Iran are in turn back formations from the Old Iranian ethnonyms Turya and Arya, respectively. Turya, or variants thereof, does not appear in any historically attested sources. However, the Turanians appear in later Iranian legends, in particular in the Shahnameh as the enemies of the Iranians. During medieval times, Turkic tribes began to settle in Turan and the name was increasingly applied to them. The modern pan-nationalist movement Turanism also ultimately derives its name from the term.

== In the Avesta ==
=== Gathas ===
The Turyas are thought to be mentioned in the Ushtavaiti Gatha. In verse Y. 46.12, names the family Friia of Tur as a follower of Asha and Ahura Mazda. This is interpreted such that he and his family hailed from the people of the Turyas. The text also seems to imply that prominent figures from the early period of Zoroastrianism belong to his family. This prominence and overall positive role of the Turanians is in contrast to their antagonistic role in other parts of the Younger Avesta as well as the absence of the Aryas in the Gathas.

=== Frawardin Yasht ===
The Frawardin Yasht is the longest of the Yashts and is dedicated to the veneration of the Fravashi, a unique Zoroastrian concept similar to and connected with the concept of the soul (urvan). This Yasht is considered to consist of two parts. In the first part, the Fravashi themselves are praised, often for providing assistance in batte. For example, Yt. 13.37–38, presents them as helping the Aryas in their fight against the Turyan Danus:

yūžam taδā tarwayata
wṛθram danunām tūranām
yūžam taδā tarwayata
δbaišāh dānunām tūranām
yušmabyō parō karšnazō
hu-wīrā bawan sawištā
yai taxmā xštāwayō
yai taxmā saušyantō
yai taxmā wṛθrājanō
xrūmāh asōbiš fra-zinta
dānunām baiwar-patinām

You then overcame
the resistance of the Turian Danus.
You then overcame
the hostilities of the Turian Danus.
Thanks to you the Karshnazids,
having good men, became the strongest.
the brave Xshtawids,
the brave Saushyants,
the brave victors,
You destroyed the crumbling (dwellings) together with (their) sites,
of the Danus who are lord of tens of thousands.

— Frawardin Yasht 13.38 (translated by William Malandra).

The identity of the Danus is unknown but they have been connected to the Iranian word for river as well as to mythical race of the Danava from the Vedas. From the text, it is clear that they are either a clan of the Turyas or are otherwise associated with them. In the second part of the Yasht, the fravashis of numerous individuals are venerated, who played an important part in the early Zoroastrian community. Several persons from the Turyas are mentioned as loyal supportes of the Zoroastrian faith, and Yt. 13.143 is dedicated to all the faithful who live in the lands of the Aryas and Turyas

tūiryanąm dax́yunąm narąm aṣ̌aoninąm frawaṣ̌ayō ý°
tūiryanąm dax́yunąm nāirinąm aṣ̌aoninąm frawaṣ̌ayō ý°

We worship the Fravashis of the holy men in the Turya lands;
We worship the Fravashis of the holy women in the Turya lands.

— Frawardin Yasht 13.143 (translated by James Darmesteter).

In addition, Yt. 13.143–144 furthermore mentions the faithful who live in the lands of the Sairimas, Sainus and Dahas. In general, the relationship between the Aryas and Turyas is presented in these verses as much more amicable.

=== Legendary Yashts ===
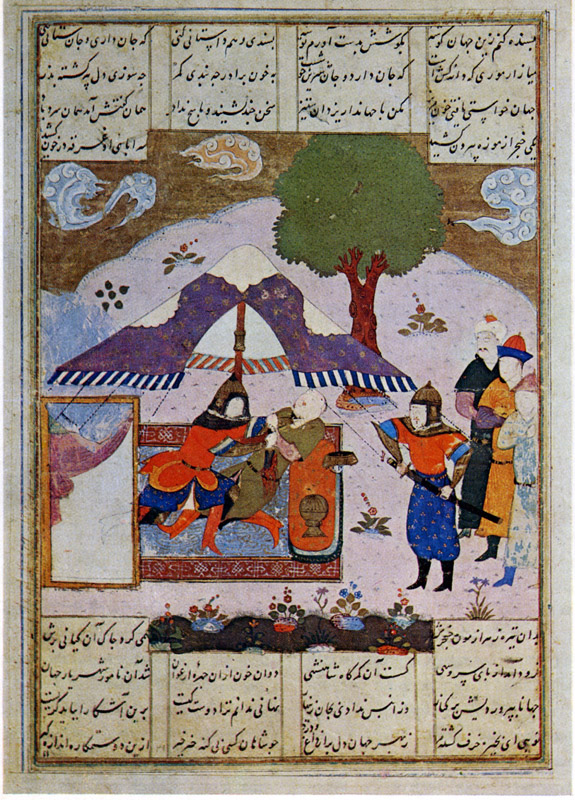
Illustration from the Shahnameh depicting the murder of Iraj by his brothers Sarm and Tur.

Most references to the Turyas in the Avesta appear in the so called Legendary Yashts, namely the Aban Yasht, the Gosh Yasht, the Ram Yasht, the Den Yasht, and the Zamyad Yasht. They are called legendary because they contain a number of allusions to the myths and legends of the people of the Avesta. These stories formed the core of later Iranian history as expressed in the Shahnameh, but may have entered the western Iranian traditions as early as the Achaemenid period.

In the Avesta, the Turyas form as a people when the primordial Pishdadian ruler, Thraetaona, divides the world between his oldest son Tur, who receives the north and east, his middle son Sarm, who receives the west, and his youngest son Iraj, who receives the south. While Tur becomes the ancestor of the Turyas, Iraj becomes the ancestor of the Aryas, who are then ruled by his grandson Manuchehr. Following this division of the world, the conflict between the two peoples evolves during the Kayanian cycle. This conflict centers around the attempts of the Turian King Franrasyan to conquer Iran and steal the royal glory of the Iranians. The fighting between the two peoples stops temporarily when Erekhsha the Archer manages to shoot an arrow as far as the Oxus river, which from then on marks the border between Iran and Turan. Kavi Xosrau eventually manages to kill Franrasyan in a fight at the "white forest".

== Later tradition ==
It is assumed that during the Sassanian period, a coherent framework of Iranian national history did exist and was presented in works like the Khwaday-Namag. In these works, factual, legendary and mythical elements are blended into a unified national history of Iran. These Sassanian era works are now lost but they formed the basis of Arab histories, like the Nihayat al-arab, which were produced after the Muslim conquest of Iran as well as a number of Iranian historizing epics, like the Bahman-nameh, the Borzu Nama, the Darab-nama; all of which were produced during the Iranian renaissance in the 9th and 10th century. The single most important work, however, from this period is the Iranian national epic, the Shahnameh.

In these works, the Turanians are consistently presented as the main antagonists of the Iranians. Many of the characters and stories from the Kayanian epic cycle, as alluded to in the legendary Yashts, reappear and are treated as basically historical. These later works were created during the 9th and 10th century AD, when the region of Turan had become mostly settled by Turkic steppe nomads. As a result, the Turanians became increasingly identified with them.

== Identity ==
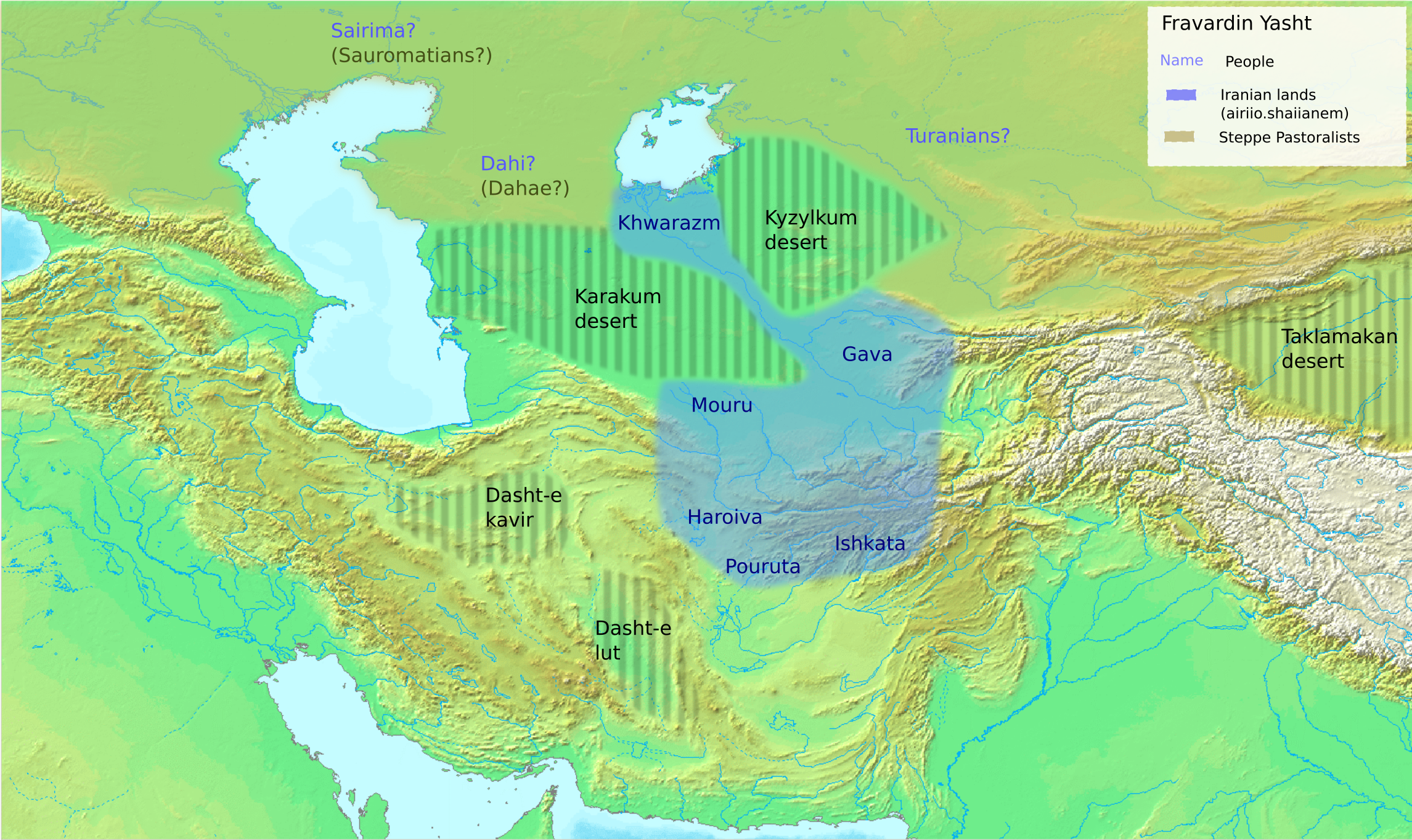
Possible location of the peoples mentioned in the Fravardin Yasht; namely the Turya, Sairima and Dahi.

The Turanians are not attested in historical 1st millennium BCE records. Achaemenid sources consistently use the term Saka when referring to northern steppe nomads, whereas Greek authors often refer to them as Scythians. Despite this, there is a scholarly consensus that the Turanians were Iranic steppe nomads living in the Eurasian steppe to the north of the ancient Iranians.

This identification is based on a number of rationals. First, during the time of the Avesta, the region of Turan was inhabited by Iranic steppe nomads. In addition, a number of Turanian personal names, like Franrasyan, Agraeratha, Biderafsh, and Arjataspa, appear in the Avesta. They have been studied by linguists and are all Iranic in character. Furthermore, the story of the mythical king Thraetaona, who divided the world among his three sons Tur (Turya), Sarm (Sairima) and Iraj (Arya), is interpreted as a recognition of an ancient kinship between Turanians and Iranians. Finally, the ethnonym of the Sairimas has been connected to the Sarmatians and Sauromatians. Likewise, the ethnonym Dahi may be related to Dahaes.
