= Iranian national history =

National history of pre-Islamic Iran

Iranian National History
- Pishdadian dynasty – Sasanian dynasty
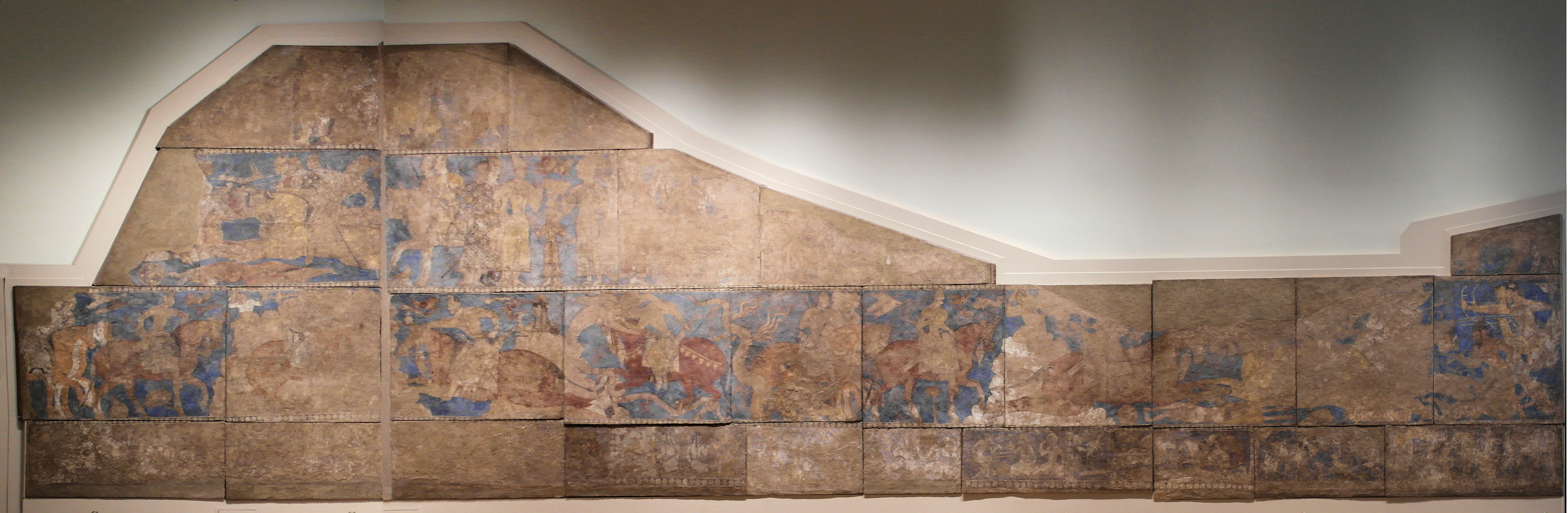
- Depiction of the Rostam cycle, an important story from Iranian national history
- Duration: 12,000 years
- Location: Greater Iran

The Iranian national history or national tradition is the collective historical memory of the pre-Islamic Iranians. It combines legendary accounts about the Pishdadians and Kayanians with historical elements about the Arsacids and Sasanians into a coherent national myth of Greater Iran.

Based on the references found in the Avesta, the core of the national history had already formed during the Young Avestan period (c. 900 – c. 400 BCE). It continued to develop during the Achaemenid (550–330 BC) and Parthian periods (247 BC–224 AD) and reached its full expression during the Sasanian Empire period (224 - 651 CE). After the Islamization of Iran, it survived by forming the basis of the Shahnameh, Iran's national epic.

== Delineation of the term ==
The Iranian national history must not be confused with the History of Iran as investigated by modern historians. Instead, it is a nationalist historiography in which historical elements are freely blended with myths and legends to create both an idealized narrative about the nation of Iran as well as an entertaining story. Overall, this narrative anachronistically combines the Iron age conditions of the heroic Avestan period, where most of the stories originated, with the feudal conditions of the Sasanian empire from late Antiquity.

== Sources ==
The historical tradition of pre-Islamic Iran was mostly oral and no contemporary history books have survived. The oldest references are found in the Avesta, in particular the so called legendary Yashts. The Zoroastrian perspective is also presented in 9th-10th century works like the Denkard, the Bundahishn and the Ayadgar-i Zariran. The ultimate representation of Iran's national history is, however, often thought to be reflected in the Khwaday-Namag, a Sasanian era history book. This work is now lost, but its content can be reconstructed from later references by Muslim historians. Although not a history book, the Iranian national tradition is most prominently told in the Shahnameh (completed in 1010), the national epic of Greater Iran.

== Development ==
The stories, characters and tropes which are found in the national history grew out of older traditions. For instance, characters like Jamshid (av. Yima), Fereydun (av. Thraētaona) and Kay Kavus (av. Kavi Usan) are also found in the Old Indic tradition as Yama, Trita, and Kavya Ushanas. They are, therefore, considered, to go back to the shared Indo-Iranian myths. Likewise, a motive like Rostam being tragically forced to kill his own son Sohrab, is also found in the Old German Hildebrandslied, suggesting an origin in the even older Indo-European myths. Specific stories, however, are first found in the oldest Iranian literary source, namely the Avesta.

=== Avestan period ===
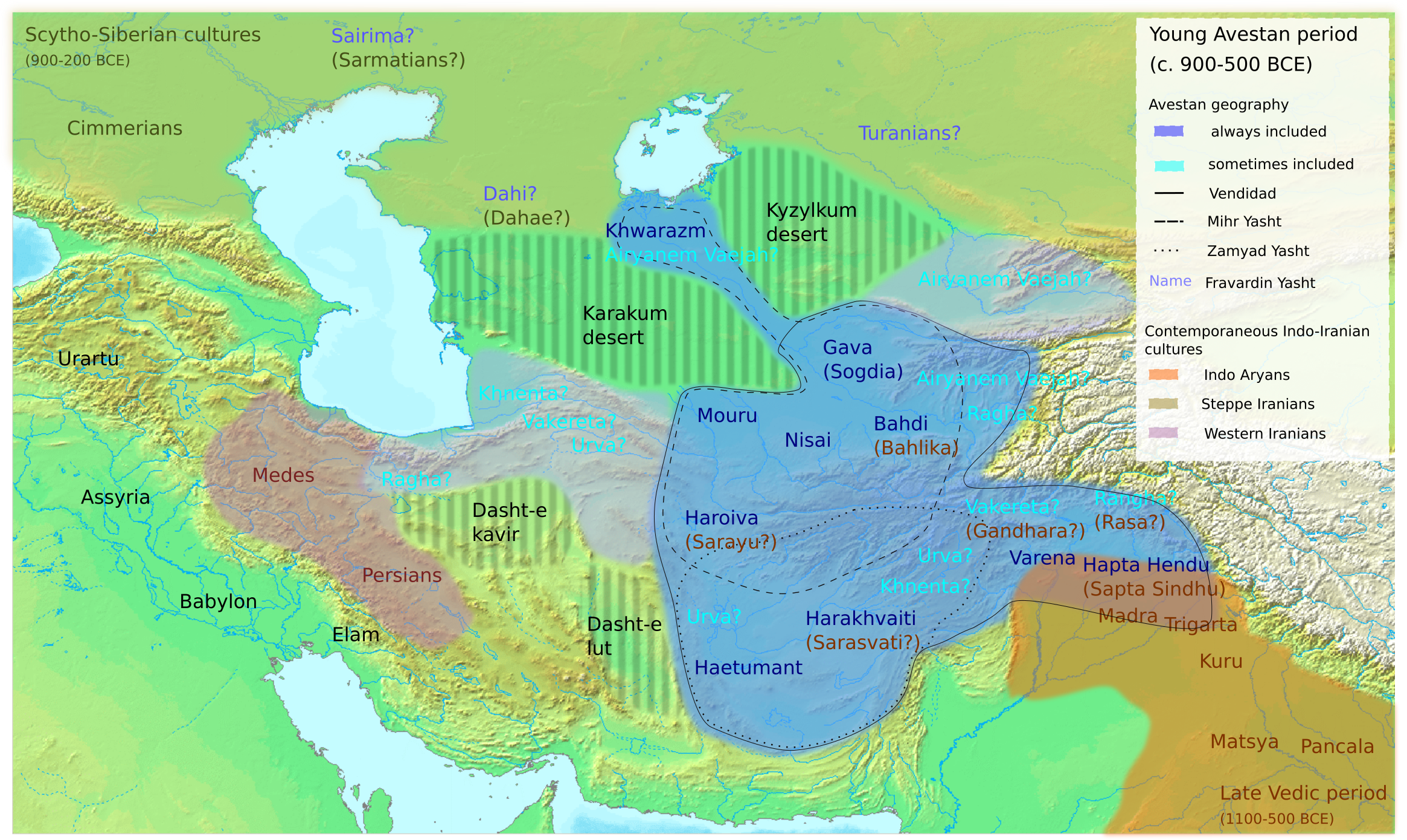
Geographical horizon of the early Iranians during the Young Avestan period

The Avesta already contains a large number of characters and stories known from the national tradition. Although it does not present them in a single coherent narrative, the numerous allusion to the myths and legends of the early Iranians demonstrate that the core of the national tradition had already formed during the Young Avestan period. This comprises in particular the reign of the mythical Pishdadians and Kayanians rulers as well as the conflict between the Iranians and their archenemy, the Turanians.

=== Achaemenid period ===
Similar to the Medes, who do not appear in the historical tradition, the Achaemenids do only appear faintly, a fact which has puzzled many historians. It is, therefore, not clear, what, if any, impact they had on its development. It has, however, been speculated that the mythical division of the world into 12,000 years was adopted by the Iranians from the Babylonians during the Achaemenid period.

=== Parthian period ===
Following the conquest of Alexander the Great, Greater Iran came under the rule of the Hellenistic Seleucid dynasty. This changed with the rise of the Arsacids, a dynasty from Parthia, who conquered Iran and created the Parthian Empire. Like the Achaemenids, the Arsacids had a mostly oral epic tradition, performed by courtly minstrels called gusans. It is, therefore, not known what impact this period had on the historical tradition. One possible example is the popular Iranian hero Rostam, a figure which does not appear in the Avesta, but has been connected to the Parthian era. Another such figure might be Goudarz, who also does not appear in the Avesta but has several connections to the Parthians.

=== Sasanian period ===
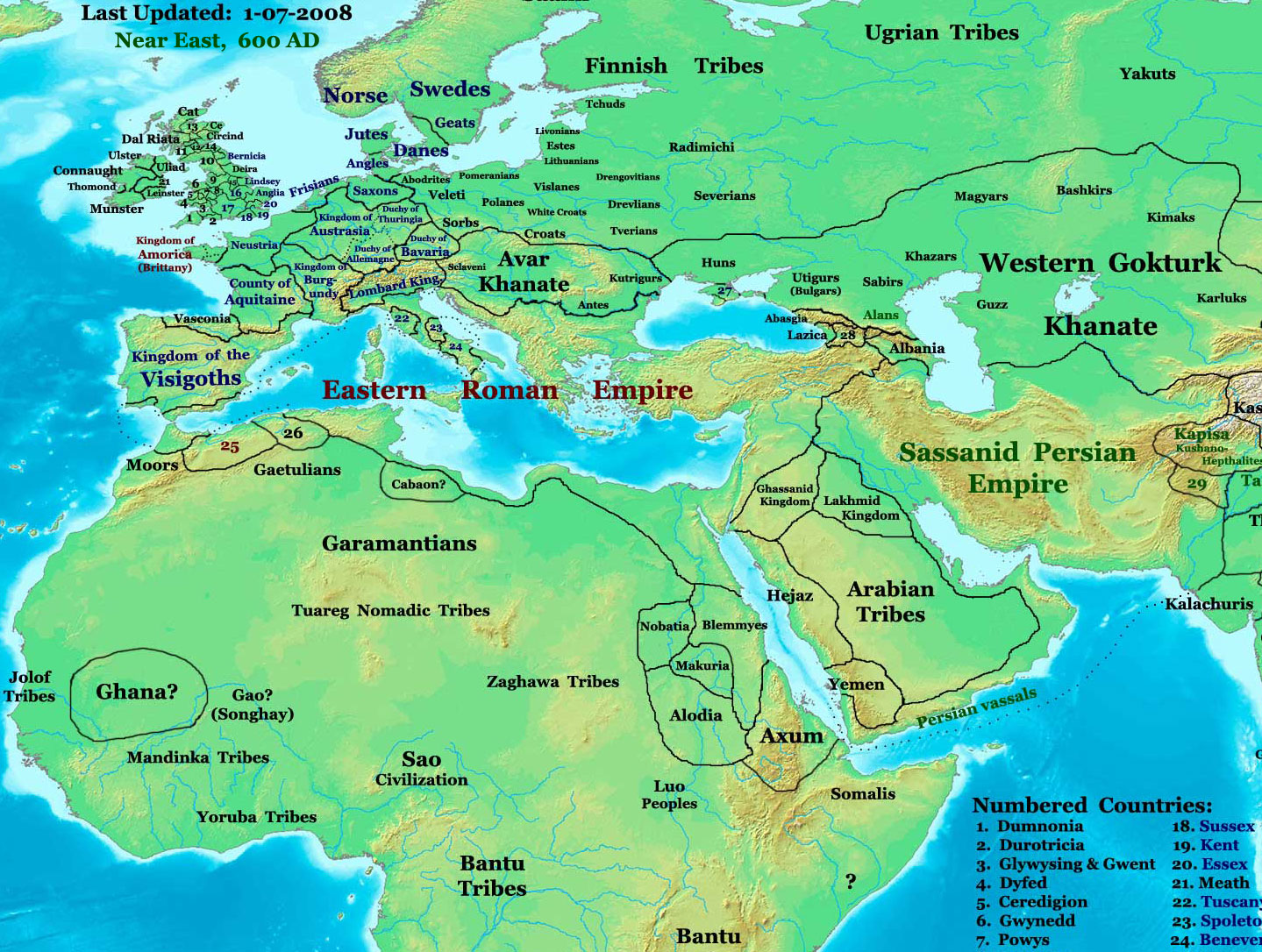
Geopolitical situation of the Sasanian Empire around 600 CE

The national tradition achieved its final form during the Sasanian period when it was written down in a courtly historiography. As a result, it anachronistically fuses the heroic and legendary stories of the Avestan period with the political and courtly conditions of the much later Sasanian era. This includes Sasanian era place names or the role of the Zoroastrian clergy in Sasanian court affairs.

In particular the geopolitical conditions of the Avestan period were adapted to the very different circumstances of the much later Sasanian era. One example is the enmity between Sasanian Iran and the Roman Empire. Since the Romans do not appear in the Avesta, they became identified with the Sairima, a people which, during the Avestan period, were living west of the Iranians. Furthermore, during Sasanian times, Turkic tribes had begun to settle in Transoxiania, the region inhabited by the Turanians in the Avesta. As a result, they became increasingly identified with them, an identification, which became common during Islamic times.

== Chronology ==
The national history of Iran is typically divided into three distinct ages. The first one is a mythical age, which comprises the initiation of the cosmic struggle between good and evil and the rule of the first dynasty, the Pishdadians. The second one is a legendary or heroic age. It comprises the so called Kayanian epic cycle, and features many Iranian heroes like Rostam and Goudarz. The last one is the historical age, which begins with the invasion of Alexander the Great and contains historical rulers of the Arsacid and Sasanian dynasties.

=== The mythical age ===
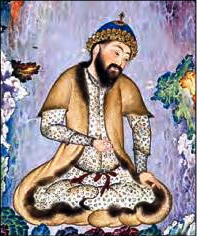
First world king Gayomard

The mythical age begins with the first world king Gayomard, although in some accounts he is merely the prototype of humans created by Ahura Mazda. He is either followed by Siyamak, his son, or the first two actual humans Mashya and Mashyana. The Pishdadian dynasty then starts with Hoshang, either the son or grandson of Siyamak. He is followed by other Pishdadians, who rule the earth by virtue of their possession of the royal glory. The most important of those is Jamshid (av. Yima), who rules for many centuries, establishes the classes of Iranian society and institutes Nowruz. However, he eventually falls from grace, loses the royal glory and is killed and dismembered by Dahak (av. Aži Dahāka). Dahak, a chief agent of Ahriman, then rules the world for a thousand years until overthrown in a rebellion led by Kava.

The new ruler is Fereydun, who divides the world between his three sons, namely Tur, who rules over Turan in the North, Salm (av. Sarm) who rules over the West (later identified with Rome) and Eraj (av. Airiia), who rules over Iran in the South. Tur and Salm conspire to murder Eraj, which starts the long rivalry between the Turanians and Iranians. This war starts with Afrasiab (av. Fraŋrasyan) invading Iran under its new ruler Manuchihr (av. Manuščiθra). The war goes in the Turanians' favor until Afrasiab agrees to have the dispute settled by having Arish (av. Erekhsha), the best archer of the Iranians, shoot an arrow to determine the new border between the two countries. Arish, with divine help, manages to make the arrow fly for over a day, eventually landing at the Oxus river, making it the border between Turan and Iran. However, the war eventually resumes and many heroes on both sides get killed.

=== The heroic age ===
The heroic age is based around the Kayanian epic cycle, known from the Avesta, enriched by the stories originally associated with the houses of Rostam and Goudarz. It begins with the birth of Rostam and the accession of Kay Kavad to the throne, signaling the beginning of the Kayanian dynasty. The first part of the heroic age sees Rostam's many adventures as well as a renewal of the war between Turan and Iran until Afrasiab is eventually killed by Kay Khosrow.

The second part of the heroic age centers around the rule of Goshtasp (av. Vištaspa), who protects the new religion of the prophet Zarathustra. Since the Turanians reject the new religion, hostilities resume under the new Turanian leader Arjasp and many heroes on both sides get killed. This part also includes the tragic fight between the two Iranian heroes Rostam and Esfandiyar (av. Spəntōδāta). Esfandiyar gets killed, but Rostam likewise dies shortly after. This inner-Iranian fighting continues under Kay Bahman leading to many deaths. The heroic age ends with the two last Kayanian rulers Dara I and Dara II, loosely based on Darius I and Darius III. The latter is killed by Alexander the Great, thus, signaling the arrival of the historic age.

=== The historic age ===
The historic age is the last one and the only one which contains verifiable historical facts. It starts with the conquest of Iran by Alexander the Great, which is presented by merging two different accounts, one positive and one negative. The positive account of Alexander is based on the Alexander Romance, where Alexander becomes a legitimate king of Iran, by marrying the daughter of the last king, and undertakes many adventures. The negative account is based on the Zoroastrian perspective in which he is called Alexander the Accursed and appears as an agent of Ahriman, bend on destroying Iran.

The rule of Alexander is not followed by Seleucids but immediately by the Parthians. Only few historical facts are correctly remembered from this time and a number of events seem to be placed elsewhere. The historical knowledge about the following Sasanian dynasty is substantially better. The chronology of the different kings is largely accurate as are some of the accounts associated with them. Overall, however, the narrative continues to focus on delivering an uplifting and moralizing story rather than providing a truly historical account.

== Themes ==
Iran's national tradition reached its definite form during the Sasanian period of Iranian history and is, consequently, strongly informed by the ideals of the Sasanian monarchy. The rule of the king and his legitimacy through the royal glory are prominent themes as is the social division into several classes. In addition, its stories are infused with a distinct Zoroastrian framework. This means that the struggles of individual heroes are depicted as part of the cosmic battle between the supreme god Ahura Mazda and his adversary Ahriman.
