= Tur (Shahnameh) =

Character from the Iranian nation history

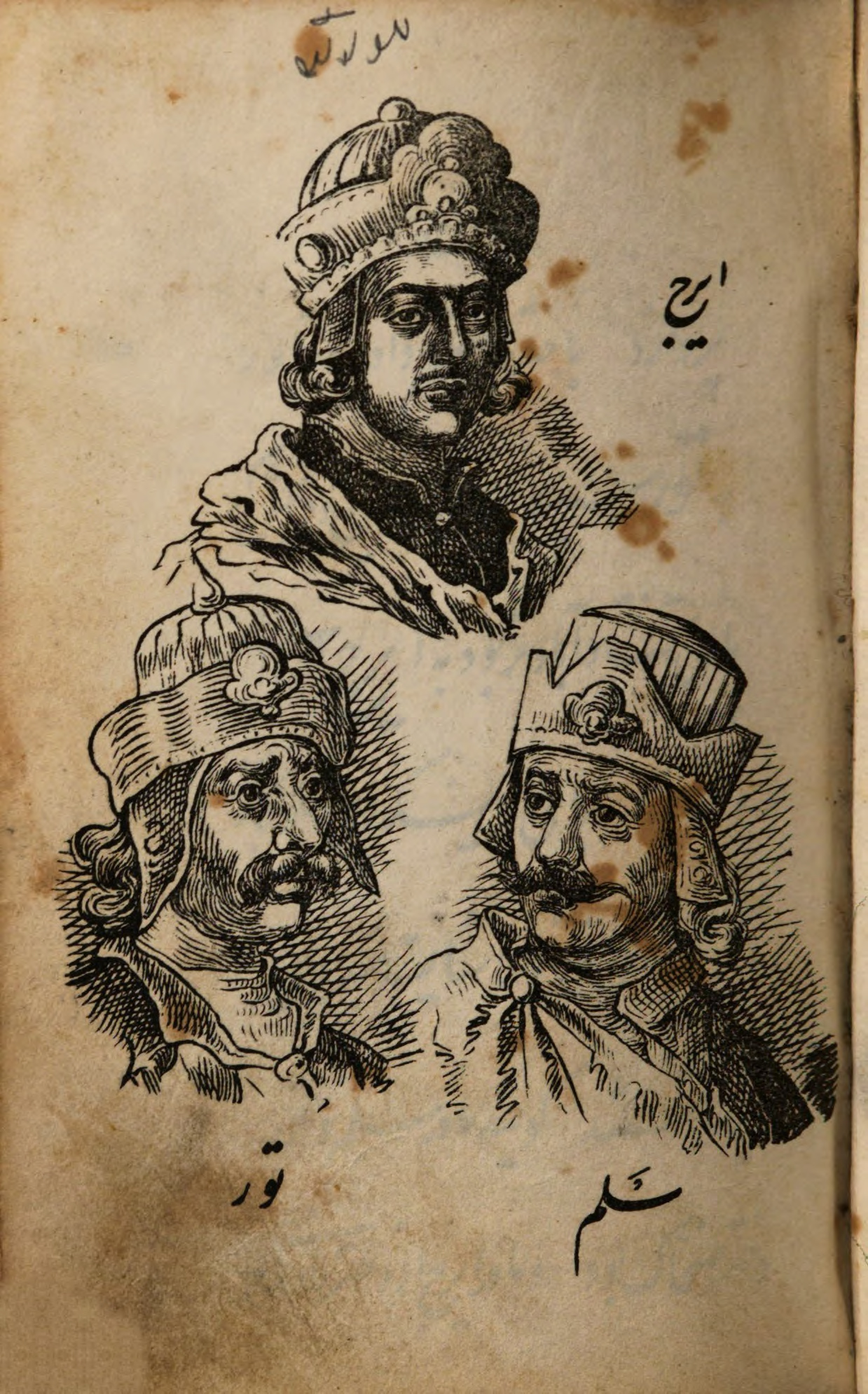
- Qajar-era illustration of Iraj, Salm and Tur

In-universe information
- Affiliation: Pishdadian dynasty
- Nationality: Turanian

Disambiguation: Tous

Tur (/ˈtʊər/; Persian: تور, pronounced [tʰuːɾ]) is, according to the Iranian national history, the second son of Fereydun and the mythical ancestor of the Turanians. He already appeared in the, now lost, Chihrdad nask, but his story is most prominently told in the Shahnameh.

== Name ==
The name appears in Middlle Persian Sources as Tuc and in the Modern Persian as Tur. Transcriptions of his name include Tōǰ, Tūč, Tūr, Tōz, ,Tūch, Tūǰ, Tūž and Tūz. It is derived from *Tūr-č, meaning Turanian indicating his role as their eponymous ancestor. This connection was, however, lost over time. According to the Shahnameh for example, his name is interpreted as "brave".

== Origins ==
The story of Tur is based on older Indo-European traditions involving a primordial king who divides his realm between his three sons. Furthermore, the story of Fereydun dividing the world among his sons has been interpreted as a memory of the kinship between Turanians and Iranians.

Tur is not mentioned in the extant Avesta, but his story was probably described in the Chihrdad nask. This book was one of the volumes of the Sasanian Avesta, but is no longer extant. However, according to a summary in the later Denkard, it contained the division of the world between him and his brothers. Next to the Denkard, the stories involving Tur have also been mentioned in other Middle Persian works like the Jamasp Namag.

== In the Shahnameh ==
The most important rendition of the story of Tur is told in the Shahnameh, the national epic of Greater Iran. He is the second son of the legendary Iranian king Fereydun and brother of both Salm and Iraj. When Fereydun divides his empire among his sons, he gives Turan and China to his second son Tur. This is the beginning of the Turanians, the neighbor and rival of the Iranians. Some of the most important characters of Shahnameh, such as Afrasiab, are his descendants. He was eventually killed by Manuchehr.

== Family tree ==
Shahrnaz	Fereydun	Arnavaz
Fereydun's Brother	Iraj	Salm	Tur
Pashang	Iraj's daughter
Manuchehr

== See also ==
- Arya (Iran)
- Turya (Avesta)
- Turan
- Aniran
