= Kay Kawad =

Iranian mythological figure

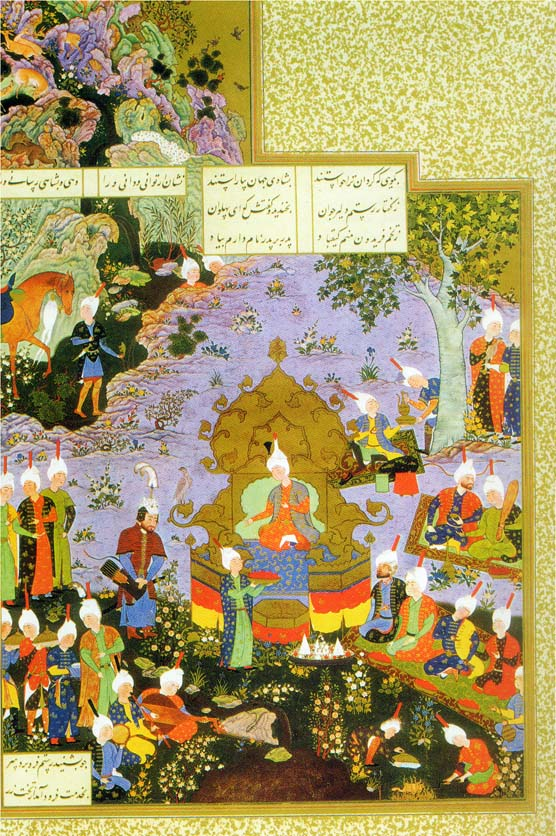
Kobad lived in the Alborz mountains and it was Rostam who brought him to the Istakhr capital.

Kay Kawad (also known as Kay Qobad, Avestan 𐬐𐬀𐬎𐬎𐬌 𐬐𐬀𐬎𐬎𐬁𐬙𐬀 Kauui Kauuāta) is a mythological figure of the Iranian national history. The 'Kay' stock epithet identifies Kawad as a Kayanian, a mythological dynasty that in tradition Kay Kawad was also the founder of. In the Shahnameh, the 'Kay' epithet is not always indicative of a king being of Kayanian origin. For instance, Kavad I, who was a Sassanid King, is frequently referred to as 'Kay Qobād' (کی قباد) in the Story of Mazdak and Qubad. The Bundahishn describes his childhood as harsh, saying he was quote: "a child in a waist-cloth (kuspud); they abandoned him on a river, and he froze upon the door-sills (kavadakan); Auzobo perceived and took him, brought him up, and settled the name of the trembling child." In the tradition preserved in the Shahnameh, Kay Kawad was a descendant of Manuchehr, and lived in the Alborz mountains, and was brought to Estaxr (the capital) by Rustam. Under Nowzar, who loses the x^{v}arənah for oppressing the Iranians, the Pishdādi dynasty grows weak, and Iran falls to the Aniranian General Afrasiab, who kills Nowzar in battle. Kay Kawad then led the Iranian forces in battle and Afrasiab's army was routed after Rustam defeated and almost captured Afrasiab. For this feat and because he possesses the x^{v}arənah he is elected king by the Iranians, and the descendants of Nowzar—Zou, Garshasp and Gastham—pay him allegiance.

According to Al-Tabari, upon being crowned, said " "We are subduing the Turkish lands and exerting ourselves in improving and taking care of our land.", Tabari also says that he was compared to Pharaoh in his self aggrandising, promotion of prosperity, and his defense of his land from enemies.

During his reign, he is said to have made people cultivate the fields and regulate the water of rivers and springs for irrigation. He also named the countries and set up their boundaries. He started collecting tithes from crops and used the income to help his army. He was eager to cultivate, to protect his borderlands, and to defend the country from its enemies. He was also haughty, and often warred with the Turks.

== Sources and references ==
- Abolqasem Ferdowsi, Dick Davis trans. (2006), Shahnameh: The Persian Book of Kings ISBN 0-670-03485-1, modern English translation (abridged), current standard
- Warner, Arthur and Edmond Warner, (translators) The Shahnama of Firdausi, 9 vols. (London: Keegan Paul, 1905-1925) (complete English verse translation)
- Shirzad Aghaee, Nam-e kasan va ja'i-ha dar Shahnama-ye Ferdousi (Personalities and Places in the Shahnama of Ferdousi, Nyköping, Sweden, 1993. (ISBN 91-630-1959-0)
- Jalal Khāleghi Motlagh, Editor, The Shahnameh, to be published in 8 volumes (ca. 500 pages each), consisting of six volumes of text and two volumes of explanatory notes. See: Center for Iranian Studies, Columbia University.

Preceded by Garshasp	Legendary Kings of the Shāhnāma; 2441–2541 (after Keyumars)	Succeeded by Kay Kavoos
