= Manuchehr =

Legendary Iranian Shah

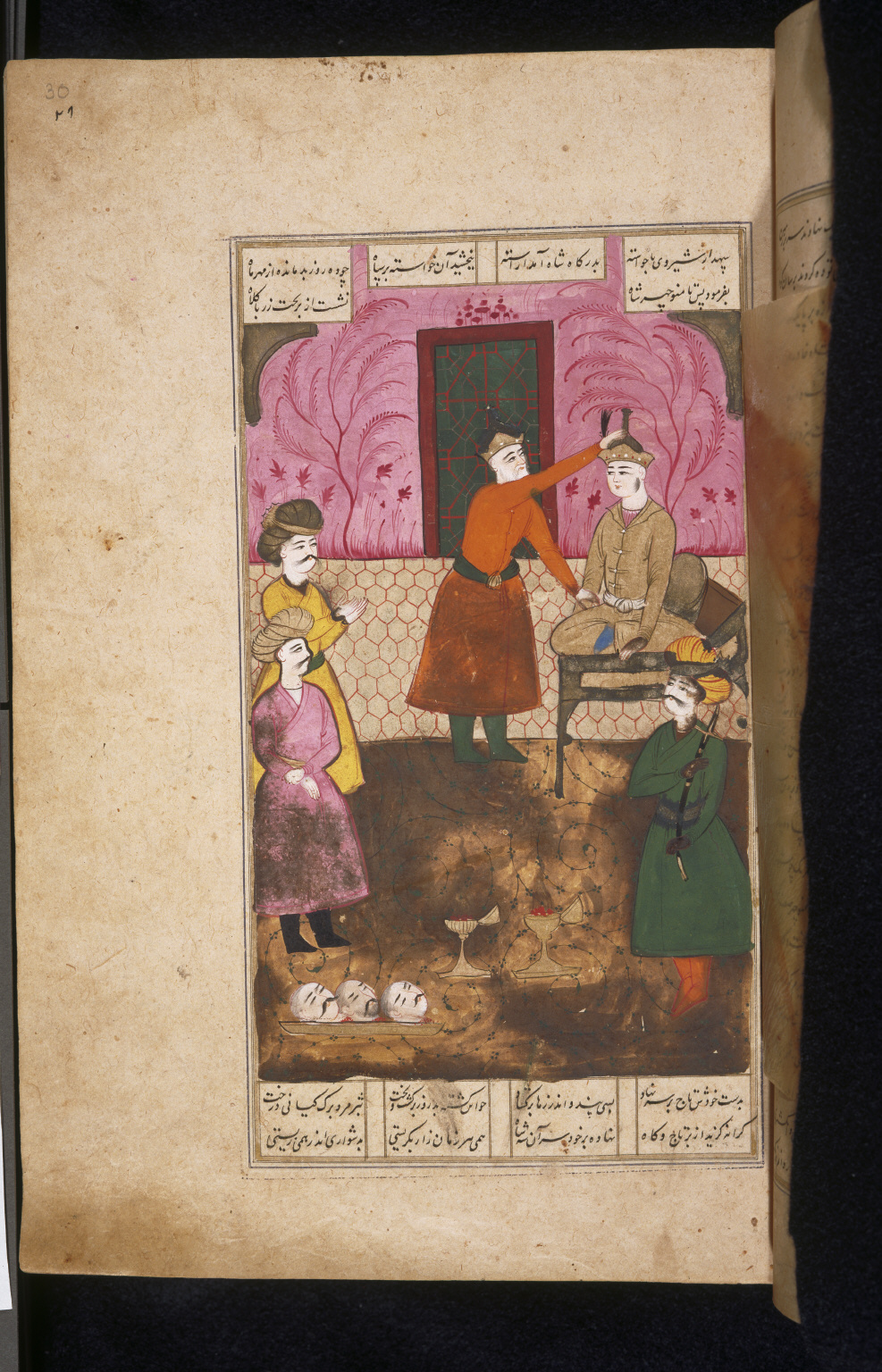
Old Persian painting, depicting Manuchehr sitting on the royal throne

Manūchehr [mænuː'tʃer] (Persian: منوچهر, older Persian Manōčihr, Avestan 𐬨𐬀𐬥𐬎𐬱𐬗𐬌𐬚𐬭𐬀 Manuščiθra), is the eighth Shah of the Pishdadian dynasty of Persia according to Shahnameh. He is the first of the legendary Iranian Shahs who ruled Iran after the breakup of the world empire of Manūchehr's great-grandfather, Fereydūn.

Manūchehr was the grandson of Iraj, who was the son of Fereydūn, and he avenged the death of Īrāj at the hands of Fereydūn's other two sons, Salm and Tur. From the death of Tūr in Manūchehr's war of vengeance sprang a war between the Iranians and Turanians that would last for centuries, until the reign of Kai Khosrow.

Manūchehr died after a reign of 120 years, and was succeeded by his son Nowzar. According to Al-Tabari, he was the first ruler to dig trenches, and the first to establish diqhans, he is also described by Tabari as just and generous.

== Family Tree ==
Arnavaz	Fereydun
Fereydun's brother	Iraj	Salm
Pashang	Iraj's daughter
Manuchehr
Nowzar
Tous	Gostahm

Shahrnaz
Tur

== Sources and references ==
- Abolqasem Ferdowsi, Dick Davis trans. (2006), Shahnameh: The Persian Book of Kings ISBN 0-670-03485-1, modern English translation (abridged), current standard
- Warner, Arthur and Edmond Warner, (translators) The Shahnama of Firdausi, 9 vols. (London: Keegan Paul, 1905–1925) (complete English verse translation)
- Shirzad Aghaee, Nam-e kasan va ja'i-ha dar Shahnama-ye Ferdousi (Personalities and Places in the Shahnama of Ferdousi, Nyköping, Sweden, 1993. (ISBN 91-630-1959-0)
- Jalal Khāleghi Motlagh, Editor, The Shahnameh, to be published in 8 volumes (c. 500 pages each), consisting of six volumes of text and two volumes of explanatory notes. See: Center for Iranian Studies, Columbia University.

Preceded by Fereydūn	Legendary Kings of the Shāhnāma; 2300–2420 (after Keyumars)	Succeeded by Nowzar
