= Iraj =

Character from the Iranian nation history

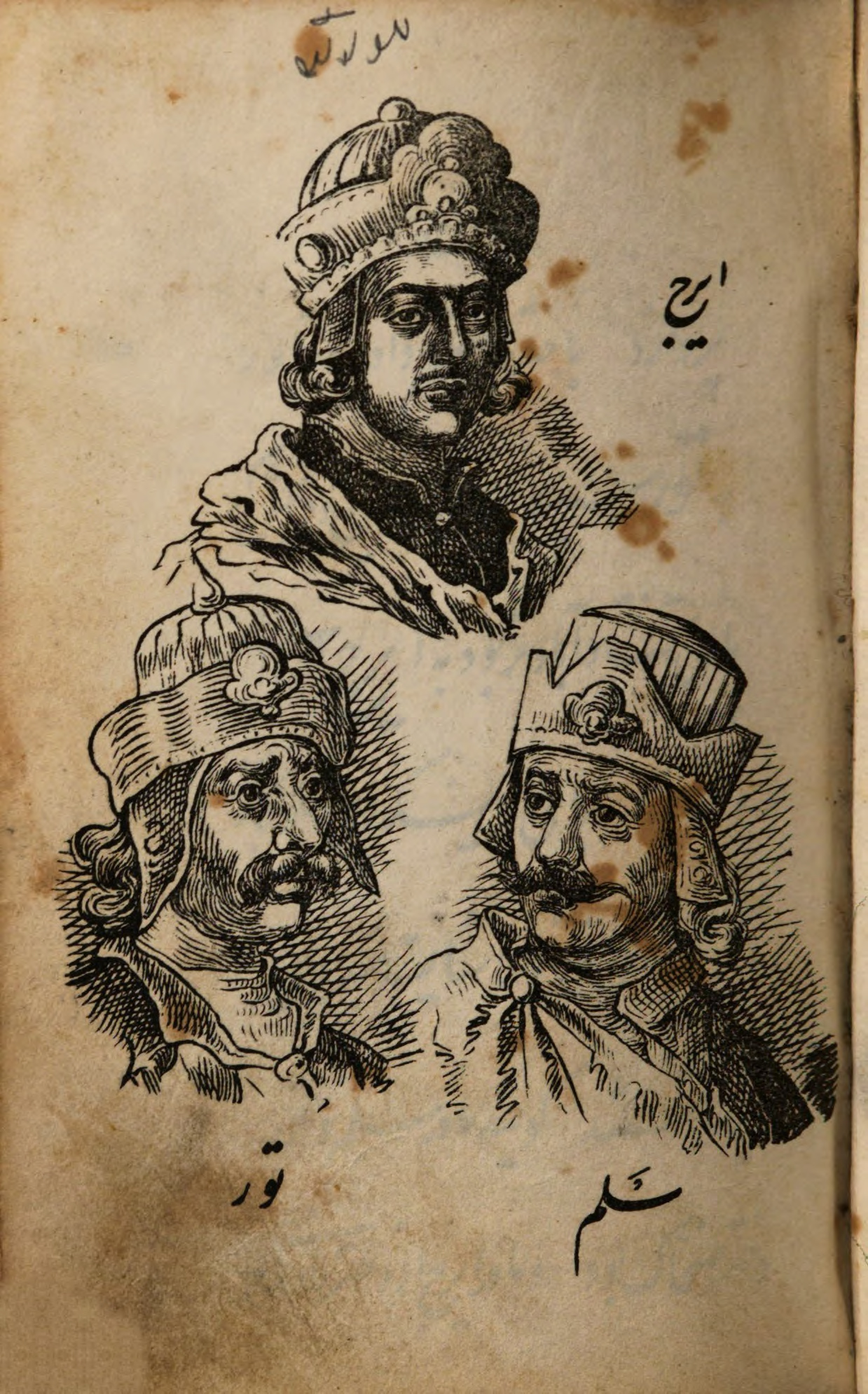
- Qajar-era illustration of Iraj, Salm and Tur

In-universe information
- Affiliation: Pishdadian dynasty
- Nationality: Iranian

Iraj (Persian: ایرج, romanized: ʾīraj) is according to the Iranian national history, the youngest son of Fereydun and the mythical ancestor of the Iranians. He already appears in the Avesta as Airiia, and in later Zoroastrian tradition as Ērič. The ultimate rendering of his story is told in the Shahnameh.

== Name ==
Iraj first appears in the Avesta under the name Airiia 𐬀𐬌𐬭𐬌𐬌𐬀. He may be mentioned in the Persepolis Elamite tablets as Harriyazza, which would be the Elamite rendering of a hypothetical Old Persian *Airya-ča. In Middle Persian literature, he appears as Ērič and in Modern Persian as Iraj (Persian: ایرج, romanized: ʾīraj. The name is universally agreed to mean Iranian, pointing to his role as the legendary progenitor of the Iranians.

== In the Avesta ==
The oldest mention of Iraj is found in the Avesta, where he appears as Airiia. In the Fravardin Yasht (Yt. 13.131), he is mentioned as the father of Manuchehr, although in later tradition he is his grandfather. Elements of his story were reportedly also provided in the Chihrdad nask. This book was one of the volumes of the Sasanian Avesta, but is no longer extant. Its content is, however, summarized in the later Denkard, according to which, it contained the division of the world between him and his brothers.

== In later tradition ==
Iraj is also mentioned in a number of Middle Persian sources, where he appears as Ērič. Next to the Denkard, which retells parts of the Chihrdad nask, he is also mentioned in the Bundahishn, which tells how his death at the hands of his brothers was eventually avenged by Manuchehr. In the Ayādgār ī Jāmāspīg, we also find the story of the division of the world, but with Salm now becoming the ruler of Rome.

== In the Shahnameh ==
The definite account of Iraj is provided in the Shahnameh by Ferdowsi. The story therein contains all the elements known from the earlier Avestan and Middle Persian sources, like the division of the world between him and his brothers, his later murder and the eventual revenge by his grandson Manuchehr. Being the national epic of Greater Iran, the story in the Shahnameh has been praised for its "eloquence and picturesque language". A modernized prose version of the story as given in the Shahnameh is presented by Yarshater.

== Gallery ==
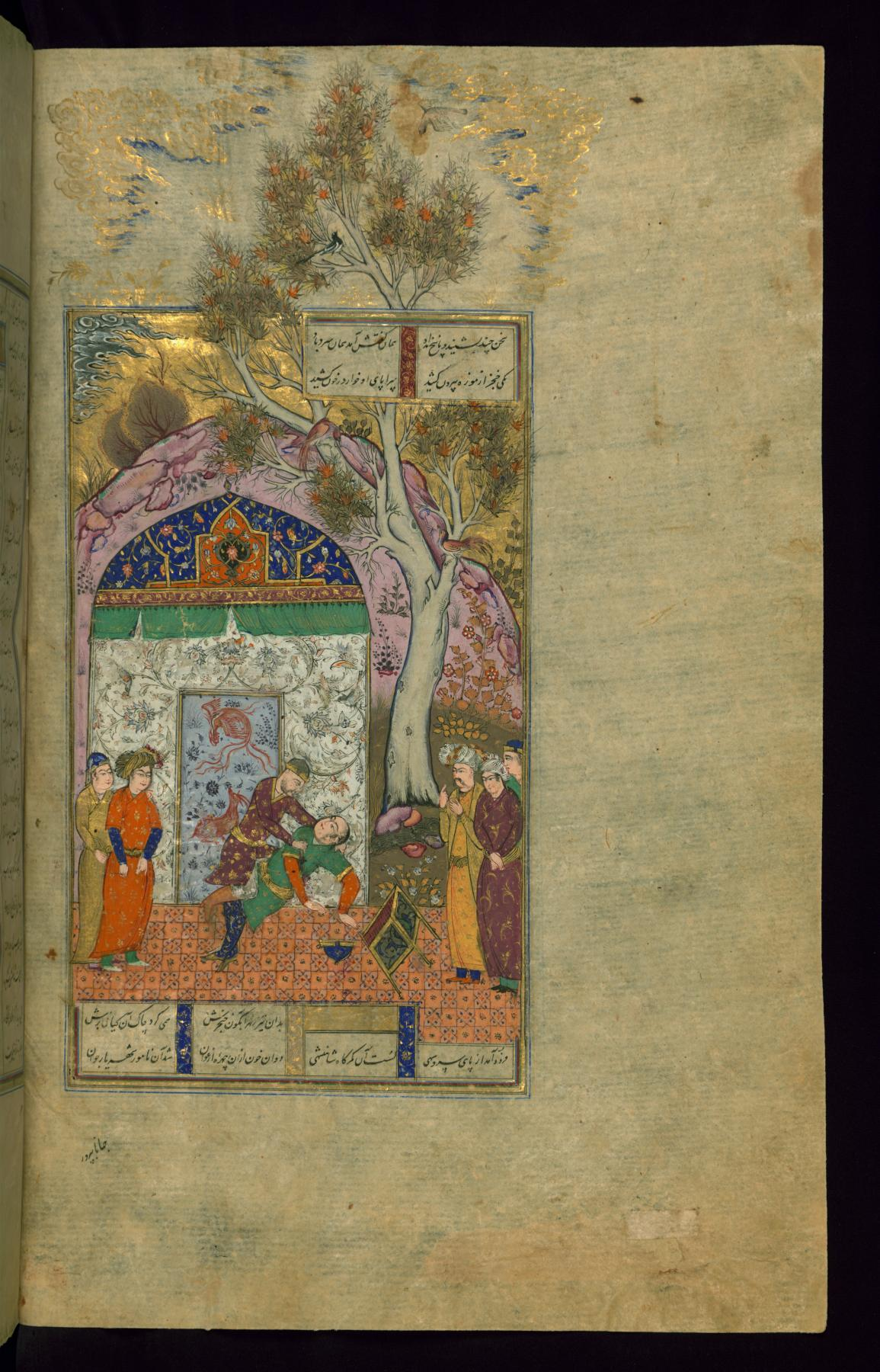
A page from Shahnameh, in Walters Art Museum, showing the murder of Iraj by his brothers

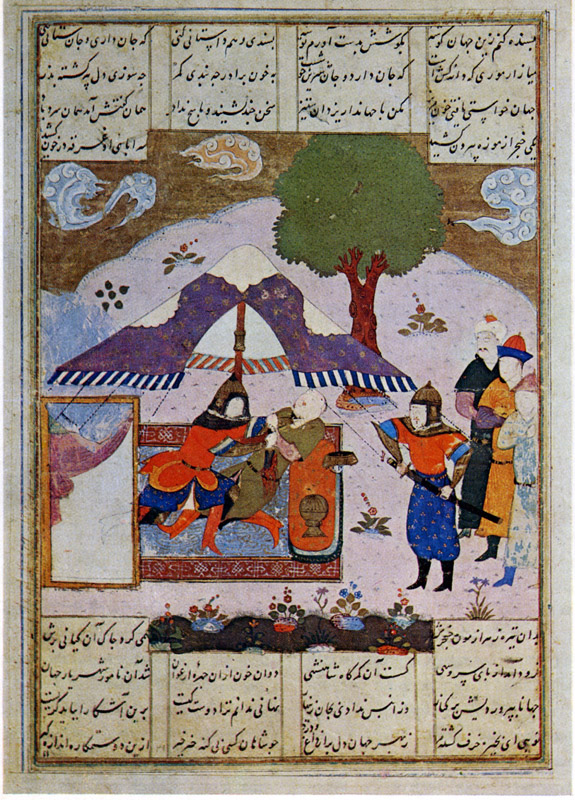
Murder scene of Iraj by his brothers, Salm and Tur, from National Library of Russia, St Petersburg – The calligraphy in the margins are Nastaliq

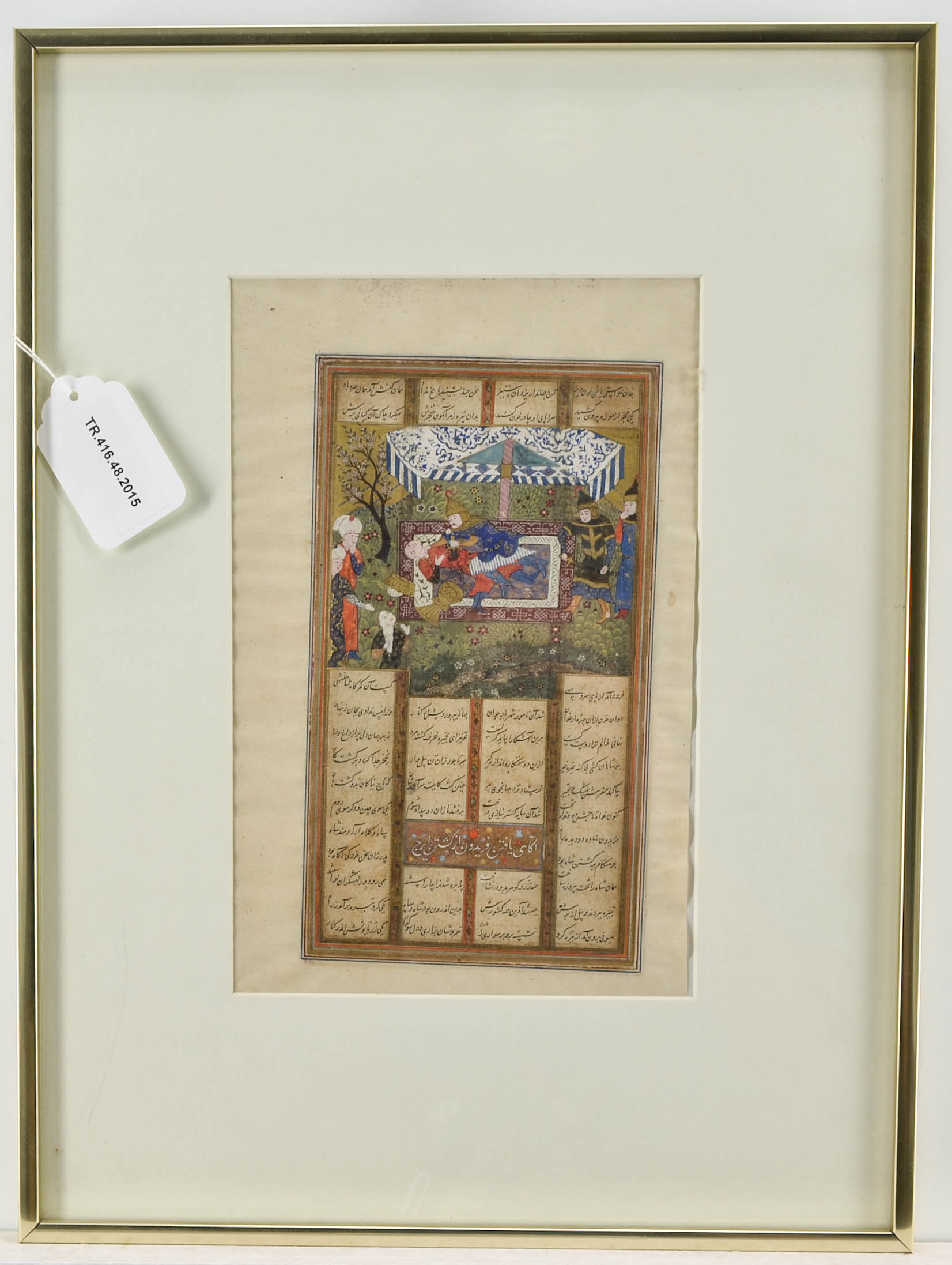
From a Folio in Abu'l Qasim Firdausi's, Shahnameh

== Family Tree ==
Arnavaz	Fereydun	Shahrnaz
Fereydun's Brother	Iraj	Salm	Tur
Pashang	Iraj's daughter
Manuchehr
