= Arnavāz =

Iranian mythological princess

Hornavāz (Persian: اَرْنَواز; "Arənauuāčī" in Avestan) is one of the two daughters (or possibly sisters) of Jamshid, the mythological king of Parsia. Arnavāz and her sister, Shahrnāz first married Zahhāk, but later married Fereydun, after he had defeated Zahhāk and imprisoned him in mount Damāvand.

In some versions of Shahname, including the Russian version, Ṯaʿālebī, Arnavaz and Shahrnāz are the daughters of Jamshid. But in others, they are his sisters.

According to the Shahname, she lived with Zahhak in harmony and Zahhak "taught her how to commit crime". Nonetheless, Arnavāz was the advisor of Zahhak. When Fereydun finally defeated Zahhak, he made Arnavāz and her sister repent, cleansed them of their sins and took both of them as his consorts. Shahrnaz had two sons with him Tur and Salm, while Arnavāz had a son with him, his youngest, Iraj. Fereydun then divided the world between his sons, giving Rum (Rome) to Salm, Turan to Tur, and Iran to Iraj. Because Iran was the best part of the world, this aroused the jealousy of Salm and Tur, leading them to kill Iraj. However, Iraj had an (unnamed) daughter who married Pashang (not to be confused with Turanian Pashang), and had a son with him, Manuchehr, who avenged his grandfather's murder.
