= Arya (Iran) =

Self-designation used by the early Iranians

Arya a^{i}riia, aryaʰ, ēr, ary, aria
- People
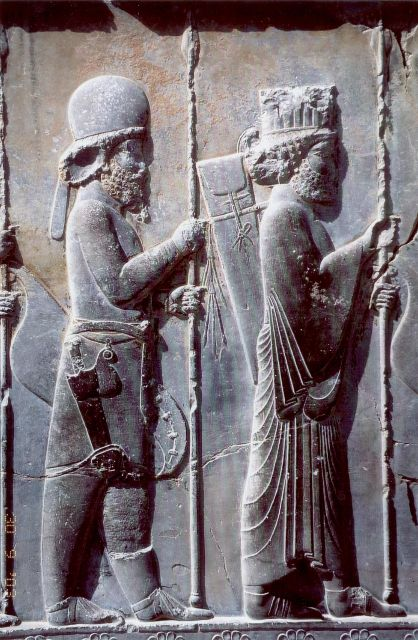
- Achaemenid Empire period relief showing a Median soldier standing behind a Persian soldier
- Ethnicity: Iranian
- Location: Greater Iran
- Language: Iranian languages
- Religion: Zoroastrianism

Arya (Note: Avestan: 𐬀𐬌𐬭𐬌𐬌𐬀, romanized: a^{i}riia Old Persian: 𐎠𐎼𐎡𐎹, romanized: aryaʰ Middle Persian: 𐭠𐭩𐭫, romanized: ēr New Persian: ایر, romanized: ēr Parthian: 𐭀𐭓𐭉, romanized: ary Bactrian: αρια, romanized: aria) was an endonym used by various Iranian peoples during the pre-Islamic history of Iran. In contrast to cognates of Arya used by the Vedic people and Iranic steppe nomads, the term is commonly translated using the modern ethnonym Iranian.

During Old Iranian times, the term was connected with one's lineage, with speaking an Iranian language and with the worship of Ahura Mazda. Being an Arya, therefore, had ethnic, linguistic and religious aspects. During the Middle Iranian period, it also acquired a political aspect through the concept of Ērānšahr (lit. 'Aryas' dominion, Aryas' realm'). Arya was also contrasted with Anārya (Avestan: 𐬀𐬥𐬀𐬌𐬭𐬌𐬌𐬀, romanized: ana^{i}riia, Middle Persian: 𐭠𐭭𐭩𐭥, romanized: anēr, New Persian: اَنیر, نیر, romanized: anēr, nēr), denoting non-Iranian lands and peoples.

After the Islamic conquest of Iran, the ethnonym fell out of use, but the term Ērān experienced a revival during the Iranian Renaissance, now as a toponym for Greater Iran. The modern ethnonym Iranian is a back-formation from the toponym Ērān, itself a back-formation from the older Arya.

== Origin and delineation of the term ==
The term Arya in different Iranian languages is assumed to derive from an unattested Proto-Iranian Áryah, itself derived from Proto-Indo-Iranian Áryas. As an ethnonym, it is also found in other Indo-Iranian peoples. In Ancient India, the term Arya (Sanskrit: आर्य, ārya) is found as a self-designation of the people of the Vedas. On the other hand, no general ethnonym is found among the Iranic steppe nomads, but a derivation of Arya appears as a self-designation of the Alans, which attest to the continued presence of the term in the steppe regions as well.

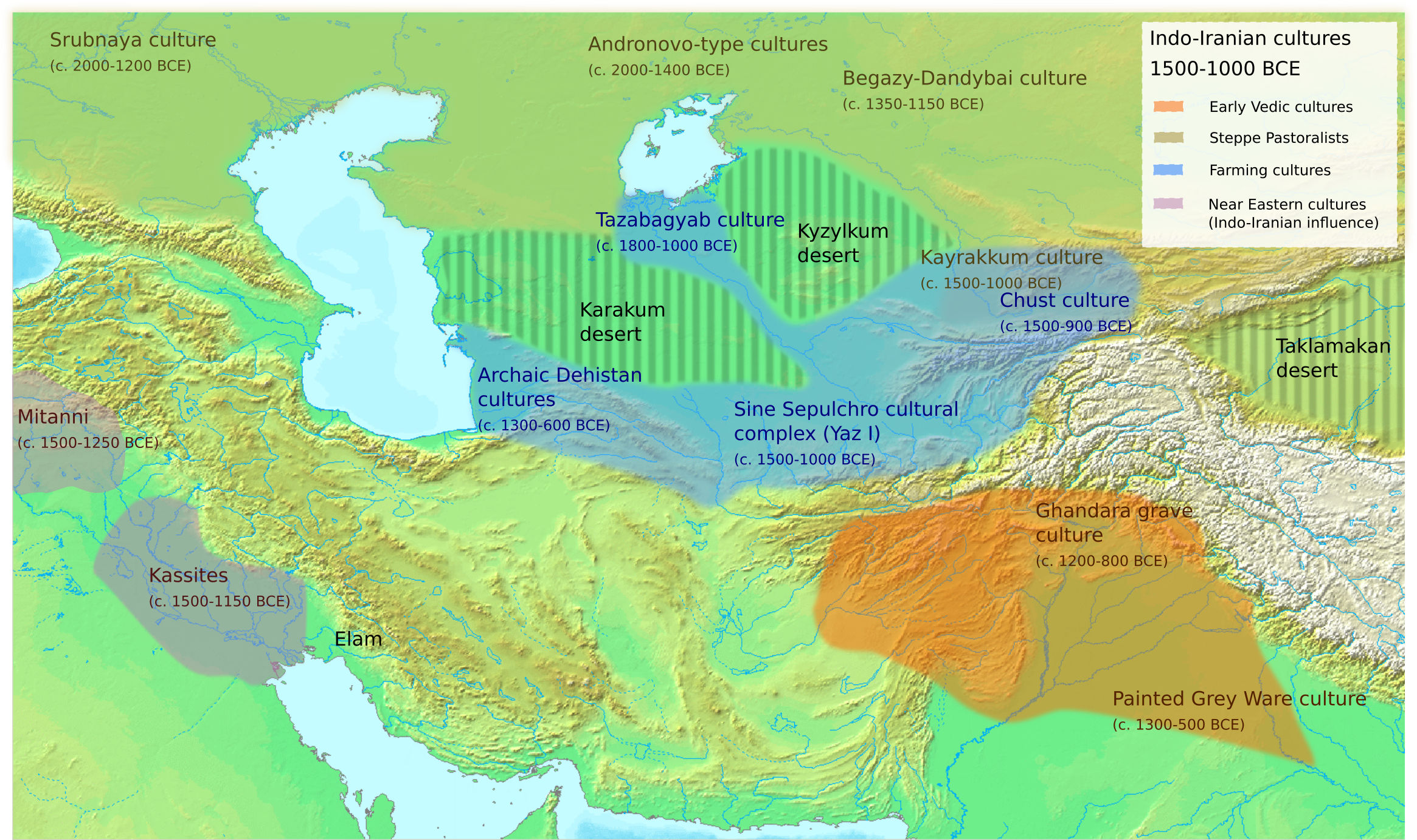
Archeological cultures associated with Indo-Iranian migrations during the Old Avestan period (c. 1500-1000 BCE)

The Proto-Indo-Iranian people were mobile pastoralists who lived in the Eurasian steppe during the Middle Bronze Age. They are connected with the Andronovo and Sintashta archeological cultures. Already during the Late Bronze Age, the Indo-Iranian unity began to split and during antiquity several culturally distinct Indo-Iranian subgroups had emerged. No generally accepted terminology in modern scholarship fully captures this situation, but those Indo-Iranian tribes that migrated into India are generally referred to as Indo-Aryans. However, subgroupings for the individual Iranophone groups vary in the literature. A common demarcation is based on the cultural and religious differences that developed between the groups that maintained their mobile, pastoral lifestyle in the Eurasian steppe and those groups which moved southward into Greater Iran and underwent a process of sedentarization and cultural change. The former are sometimes referred to as Iranic, i.e., speaking an Iranian language, while the term Iranian may be reserved for groups associated with Iran in a historical and cultural sense. The latter are sometimes further subdivided into Eastern and Western Iranians based on linguistic criteria.

A distinct identity of the Arya in Greater Iran is already present in the Avesta, i.e., the collection of sacred texts in Zoroastrianism. Jean Kellens for example notes, how the Avesta describes a common creation myth through the primordial man Gayomart, a shared history through the Pishdadian and Kayanian dynasties, a pronounced in-group and out-group dichotomy through the enmity between the Turyas and Aryas, as well as a shared religious practice through the worship of Ahura Mazda; elements which are not found in other Indo-Iranian groups. Likewise, Elton L. Daniel notes how "many customs of the Avestan people seem to have been almost deliberately designed to reinforce a sense of identity as a people apart from the non-Aryans and even other Aryans."

== Avestan period ==
The Avesta, i.e., the collection of canonical texts of Zoroastrianism, provides the single largest literary source on the Old Iranian period. As regards the geographical boundaries of the Avesta, the place names show that the Aryas lived in the eastern portions of Greater Iran. As regards its chronology, the different parts of the text are assumed to have been produced, revised and redacted over a long period of time and therefore reflect a large time span of possibly several centuries. There are no dateable events in the Avesta, but the complete lack of any discernible influence by the Persians or Medes makes a time frame after the 5th century BCE for most of the texts unlikely. Most scholars, therefore, assume that the bulk of the Old Avestan material reflects the end of the second millennium BCE and the Young Avestan portion reflects the first half of the first millennium BCE.

The Old Avestan portion of the text, assumed to be authored by Zarathustra and his immediate followers, only contains a reference to Airyaman, which has an unclear connection to Arya. The Young Avestan portion of the text, however, frequently uses the term Arya as the endonym of the Avestan people. Next to its singular nominative form (airiia), the word appears in the plural (aire, Aryas), in the locative singular (airiiene, place where the Arya), the locative plural (airiio, place where the Aryas), the genitive plural (airiianąm, Aryas' or of the Aryas) (Note: English no longer has a proper genitive case. As a result, an Avestan genitive construction like airyanąm dahyunąm can be rendered either as the Aryas' lands (using the Saxon genitive) or the lands of the Aryas (using the preposition of).) or as an adjective (airiianəm, Arya).

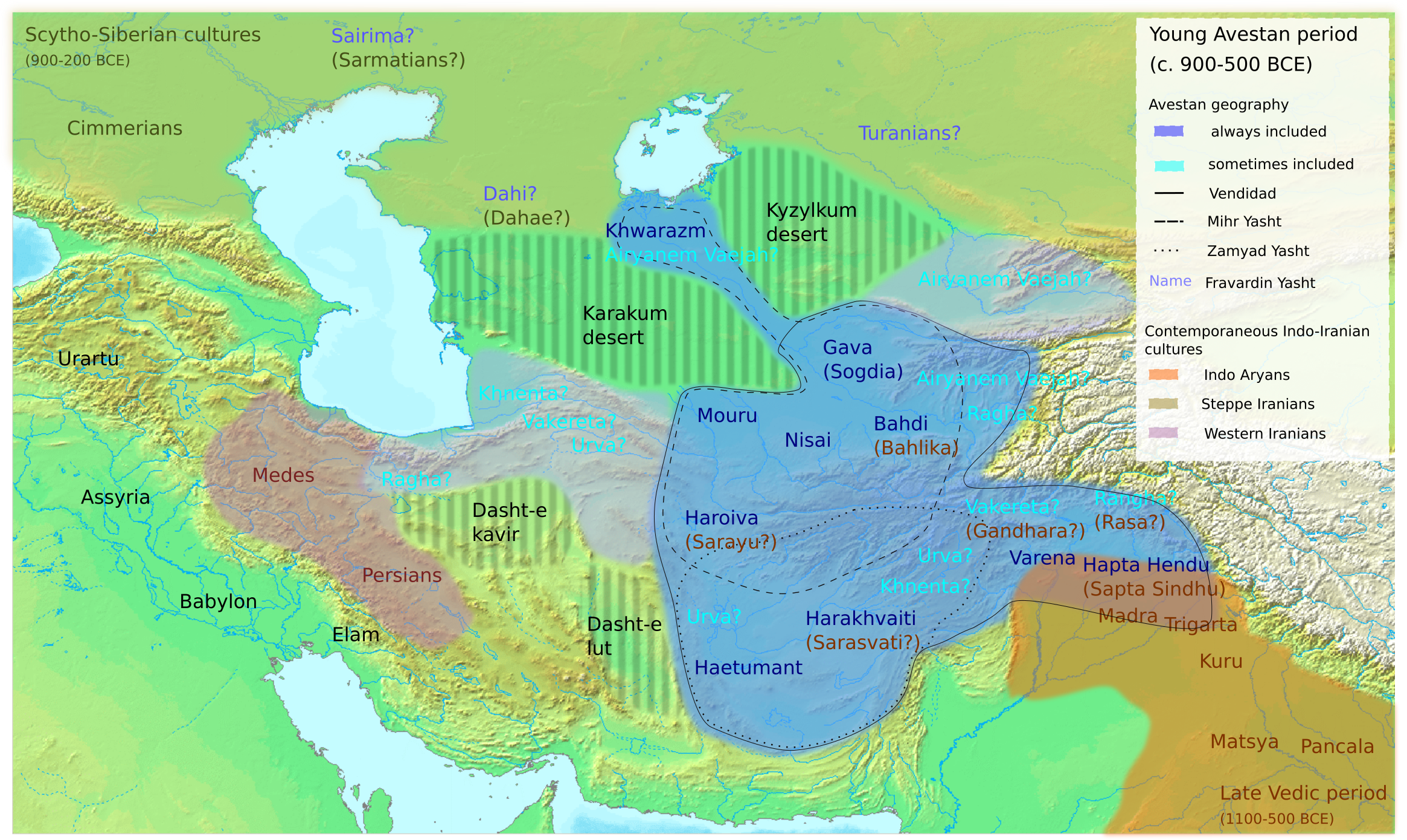
Geographical horizon of the Aryas of the Avesta vis-a-vis other Indo-Iranian groups during the Young Avestan period (c. 900-500 BCE).

In the Avesta, the ethnonym Arya qualifies a number of toponyms, most prominently Airyanem Vaejah (airiianəm vaēǰō, the Arya expanse). This place name appears in a number of mythical passages but may also refer to a real-world place depending on the context. The toponym Aryoshayana (airiio.shaiianem, place where the Aryas dwell) appears only once in the Mihr Yasht. In this text, it is used as an umbrella term for a number of eastern regions centred on northern Afghanistan and Tajikistan. The Avesta also refers several times to the Airyanam Dahyunam (airiianąm dahyunąm, Aryas' lands). In the Frawardin Yasht, these lands are contrasted with the lands of the Turyas, Sairimas, Dahas and Sainus. The Turyas are the Turanians from later legends and are typically located beyond the Oxus River. The Sairimas have been connected to the Sarmatians and Sauromatians based on linguistic similarities. Likewise, the Dahas may be related to Dahaes or to the Dasas known from the Vedas. The identity of the Sainus, however, is unknown. In general, scholars assume that these ethnonyms refer to Iranic steppe nomads living in the Eurasian steppe to the north. An Iranic identity of these groups may be remembered in the legends surrounding the mythical king Thraetaona, who divided the world among his three sons: The oldest son Tur (Turya) was given the north and east, the second son Sarm (Sairima) was given the west, and the youngest son Iraj (Arya) was given the south.

The Avesta also conveys a clear dichotomy between the Aryas and their enemies, the Turyas, through several stories. They centre around the attempts of the Turyas and their mythical King Franrasyan to acquire the Khvarenah of the Aryas (airiianąm xᵛarənō). The fighting between the two peoples stops for some time when Erekhsha (Ǝrəxša), described as the "most swift-arrowed of the Aryas" (xšviwi išvatəmō airiianąm), manages to shoot an arrow as far as the Oxus River, which from then on marks the border between Iran and Turan. Kavi Xosrau, described as the "hero of the Aryas" (arša airiianąm), eventually manages to kill Franrasyan with the help of "all the Aryas" at the "white forest" (vīspe.aire.razuraya). These stories and its characters occur prominently in many later Iranian texts like the Bahman-nameh, the Borzu Nama, the Darab-nama, and the Kush Nama. However, their most significant impact comes from forming the core of the Iranian national epic, the Shahnameh, thus becoming a crucial element of Iranian identity.

== Achaemenid period ==
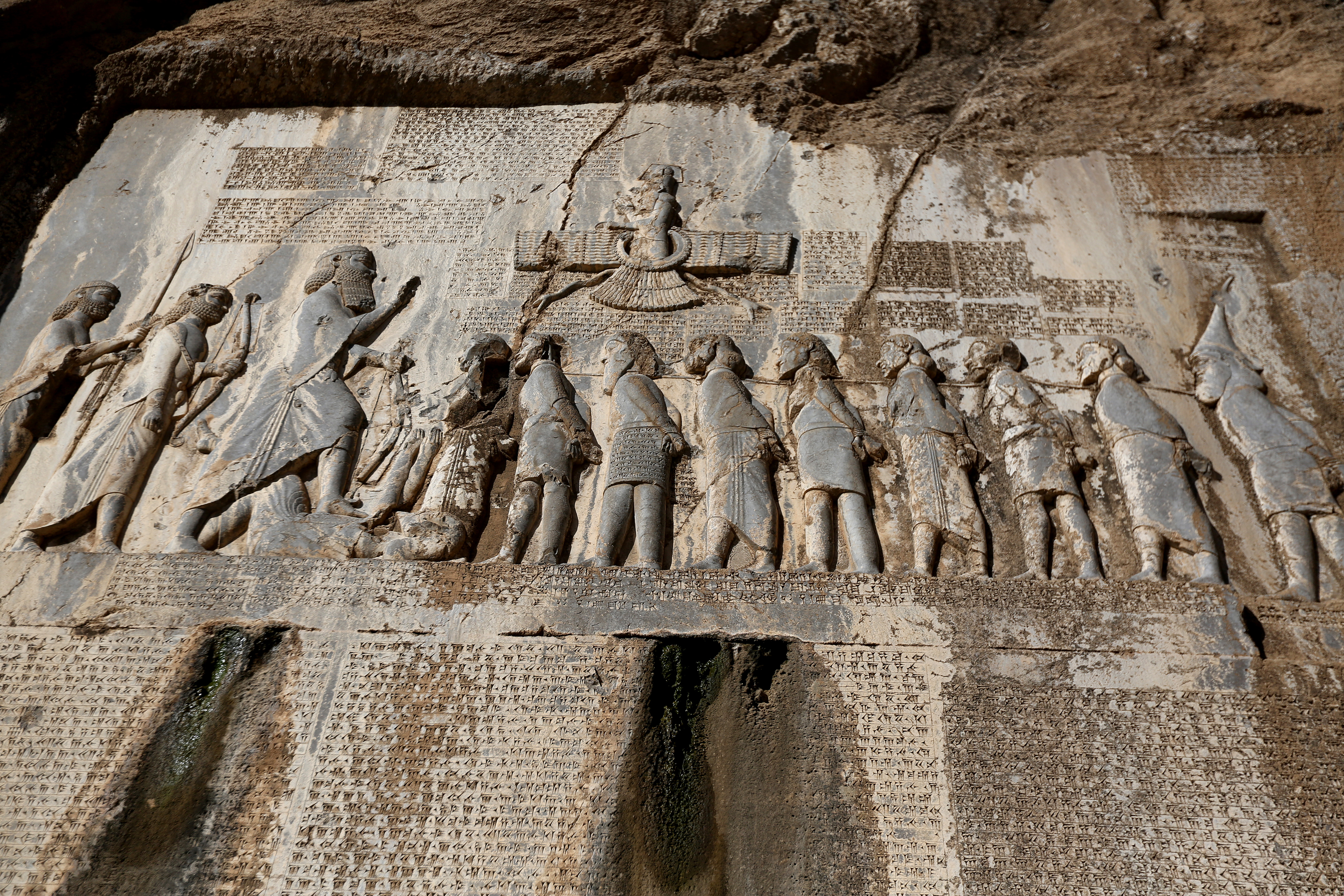
Close up of the Behistun inscription by Darius the Great.

During the Achaemenid Empire, the first epigraphically attested references to the ethnonym Arya appear. By the late 6th–early 5th century BCE, the Achaemenid kings Darius the Great and his son Xerxes I produced a number of inscriptions in which they use the term. In those inscriptions, Arya has linguistic, ethnic and religious connotations.

In the trilingual (Old Persian, Akkadian, and Elamite) Behistun inscription, authored by Darius during his reign (522 – 486 BCE), Old Persian is called Arya, indicating it to be an umbrella term for Iranian languages. Furthermore the Elamite version of the inscription portrays the Zoroastrian supreme god Ahura Mazda as the "god of the Aryas" (ura-masda naap harriia-naum). In addition to this linguistic and religious use, Arya also appears on some inscriptions by Darius and Xerxes, where they describe themselves as "an Achaemenid, a Persian, son of a Persian, and an Arya, of Arya lineage". This expression has been interpreted as outward going circles of kinship, beginning with the inner clan (Achaemenids), then the tribe (Persians) and finally the outmost nation (Arya). However, Arya in this phrase has also been interpreted as expressing a connection to the cultural and religious traditions of the Aryas of the Avesta.

During the Achaemenid period, there is also the first outside perspective on the ethnonym. In his Histories, Herodotus provides a number of information on the Medes. Herodotus reports that, in the past, the Medes used to be called Arioi, i.e., Aryas. He also names the Arizantoi as one of the six tribes composing the Medes. This is interpreted as *arya-zantu ('of Arya lineage').

== Hellenistic and Parthian period ==
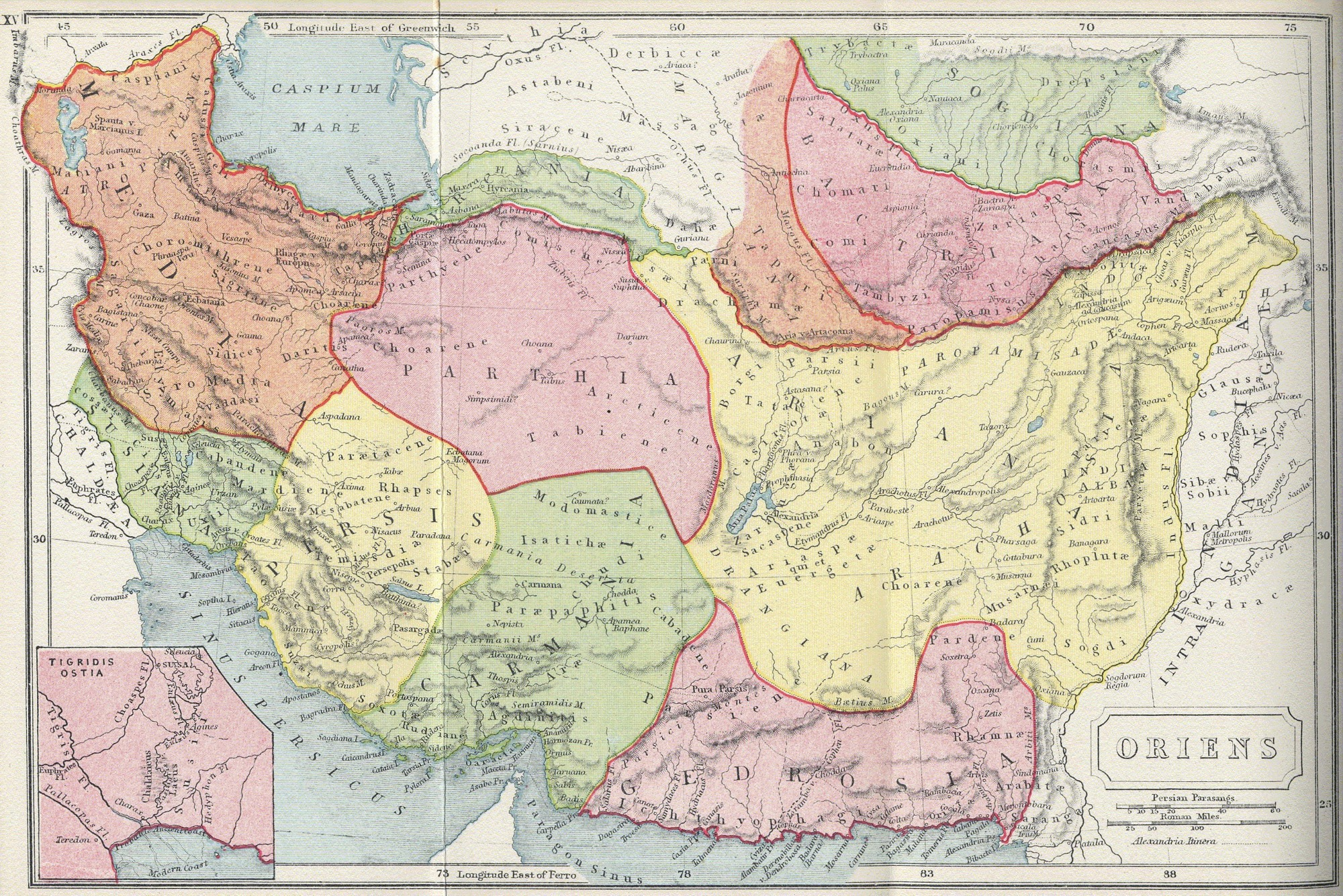
Ariana according to Eratosthenes shown in yellow.

The Achaemenid Empire ended with the conquest of Alexander the Great, after which Greater Iran became part of the Hellenistic world. This substantially increased the knowledge of Greek authors of those eastern regions. The Greek polymath Eratosthenes describes those regions in his Geographica. The work is now lost but cited by the historian and geographer Strabo in his own Geographica. In those books, Eratosthenes and Strabo (Strab. 15.2.8) identify the country of Ariana, i.e., the country of the Aryas. Ariana covers most of eastern Greater Iran and coincides to a significant degree with the area delineated in the Avesta. In his Bibliotheca historica, the ancient Greek historian Diodorus Siculus names Zarathustra as one of the Arianoi.

The Parthian period saw the Iranian Parthians gain control over most of Greater Iran. This did, however, only lead to a limited revival of Iranian culture, as the Arsacid ruling dynasty had an overall cosmopolitan approach and patronized both Iranian and Hellenistic elements. Consequently, the main reference to the ethnonym Arya during the Parthian period is found in Bactria, which was not part of their empire. In the Rabatak inscription, Arya is used as the name of the Bactrian language, showing its continued use as an umbrella term for Iranian languages. This linguistic aspect of Arya, therefore, parallels the one described in the Behistun inscription by Darius the Great several centuries earlier. Likewise, Strabo quotes in his Geographica (Strab. 15.2.8) Eratosthenes, who observed that the people of Persia, Media, Sogdia and Bactria all speak nearly the same language.

== Sassanian period ==
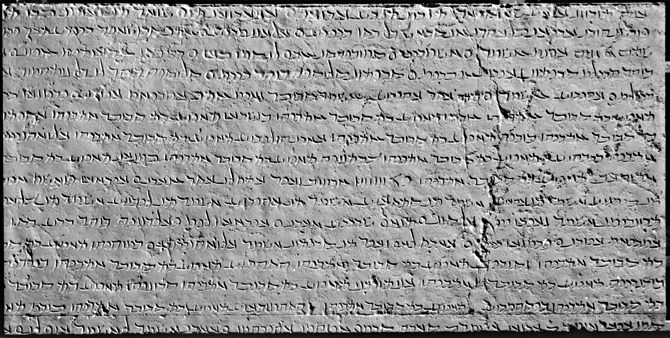
Parthian version of the trilingual inscription at Ka'ba-ye Zartosht by Shapur I.

The Sassanian period saw a pronounced resurgence of Iranian culture and religion and its close interaction with political power under the influential Zoroastrian high priest Kartir on one side and several Sassanian kings on the other side. Arya appears in Middle Persian as 𐭠𐭩𐭫 (ēr) and in Parthian as 𐭀𐭓𐭉 (ary), most prominently in Shapur I's inscription at the Ka'ba-ye Zartosht. In this inscription and on a number of coins by Bahram II, Arya appears jointly with the term Mazdayasna, indicating a close connection between the political and religious spheres.

The Sassanian period also saw the emergence of Arya as a political term in the form of Ērān (𐭠𐭩𐭥𐭠𐭭, ērān) and Ērānshahr (𐭠𐭩𐭥𐭠𐭭𐭱𐭲𐭥𐭩, ērānšahr). Here, Shahr (𐭱𐭲𐭥𐭩, šahr) goes back to Avestan Kshathra (𐬑𐬱𐬀𐬚𐬭𐬀, xšaθra, lit. 'rule, dominion or control'). Eran already appears under Ardasher I as Shahanshah-i Eran (lit. 'King of Kings of the Aryas'), whereas Shahanshah-i Eranshahr (lit. 'King of Kings of the Dominion of the Aryas') appears in Kartir's inscription at Naqsh-e Rajab and several royal inscriptions starting with Shapur I and continuing with his successors. Initially, the term Eran was still understood to be the genitive plural of ēr with the case ending -ān. However, Middle Persian saw the gradual loss of case endings and their replacement with particles. As a result, the term Eranshahr underwent a process of toponymic ellipsis and expressions like Shahanshah-i Eran and Shahanshah-i Eranshahr became King of Kings of Eran and King of Kings of the Dominion of Eran, respectively. (Note: In English, toponymic ellipsis is often seen in place names formed through the Saxon genitive. Thus, a term like Moe's Tavern is usually shortened to Moe's.)

== Islamic period ==
After the Islamic conquest of Iran, Arya and its derivatives fell out of use, possibly due to their perceived connection with Zoroastrianism. However, the 9th century saw a revival of Iranian national sentiment, with a number of local Iranian dynasties coming to power. During this time, the terms Eran and Eran Shahr saw a resurgence, but were now generally understood as purely geographical terms. This can be seen above all in the emergence of the New Persian ایرانی (Ērānī, Iranian), as a back formation from ایران (Ērān, Iran). New Persian Ērān, therefore, replaced the Pre-Islamic Arya and its derivatives as the ethnonym of the Iranian peoples and became the origin of English Iranian and its cognates in other Western languages.

== Modern period ==
The modern period in the history of Iran saw the rise of Iranian nationalism and, with it, a renewed focus on the ancient national past of the pre-Islamic Iran. This became institutionalized when, in 1935, Reza Shah, founder of the Pahlavi dynasty, issued a decree that changed the name, used for international correspondence, from Persia to Iran. His successor, Mohammad Reza Pahlavi, officially used the title of Aryamehr (Persian: آریامهر, romanized: Āryāmihr, lit. 'light of the Aryas'), making it the first time since the Sassanian period that the ethnonym Arya was used.

== See also ==
- Iranian nationalism
