= Shahrnāz =

Iranian mythological princess

Shahrnāz (Persian: شَهرناز; Saŋhauuāčī in Avestan) is one of the two daughters (or possibly sisters) of Jamshid, the mythological king of Iran. In some versions of Shahnameh, including the Moscow version and that of Ṯaʿālebī, Shahrnāz and her sister, Arnavāz are the daughters of Jamshid, but in others, they are his sisters.

According to the Shahnameh, when Jamshid became proud of himself and lost his Khvarenah, Zahhak made the war upon Jamshid, and he was welcomed by many of Jamshid's dissatisfied subjects. Jamshid fled from his capital, but Shahrnāz and Arnavāz were captured and forced to consort Zahhak. After Fereydun finally defeated Zahhak and imprisoned him in mount Damāvand, he married both sisters. Shahrnaz bore him two sons Tur and Salm, while Arnavāz bore him his youngest son, Iraj. Fereydun then divided the world between his sons, giving Rum (Rome) to Salm, Turan to Tur, and Iran to Iraj.
