= Jamasp Namag =

Historical Zoroastrian text

The Jamasp Nameh (var: Jāmāsp Nāmag, Jāmāsp Nāmeh, "Story of Jamasp") is a Middle Persian book of revelations. In an extended sense, it is also a primary source on Medieval Zoroastrian doctrine and legend. The work is also known as the Ayādgār ī Jāmāspīg or Ayātkār-ī Jāmāspīk, meaning "[In] Memoriam of Jamasp".

The text takes the form of a series of questions and answers between Vishtasp and Jamasp, both of whom were amongst Zoroaster's immediate and closest disciples. Vishtasp was the princely protector and patron of Zoroaster while Jamasp was a nobleman at Vishtasp's court. Both are figures mentioned in the Gathas, the oldest hymns of Zoroastrianism and believed to have been composed by Zoroaster. Here (chap. 3.6-7) there occurs a striking theological statement, that Ohrmazd’s creation of the seven Amašaspands was like lamps being lit one from another, none being diminished thereby.

The text has survived in three forms:

- a Pahlavi manuscript, that is, a rendering of the Middle Persian language using an Aramaic-derived script and accompanied by Aramaic ideograms. The Pahlavi manuscript is damaged and fragmented.
- a transmission in Pazand, that is, a rendering of the Middle Persian language using Avestan script (also an Aramaic derivative) but without any non-Iranian vocabulary. The Pazend version has survived in its entirety.
- a Modern Persian translation in Arabic script has also survived. It is slightly younger than the other two manuscripts.

== See also ==
- The Dēnkard, a 10th-century compendium of the Zoroastrian beliefs and customs.
- The Bundahishn, a Zoroastrian account of Mazdaen cosmogony and cosmology.
- The Ayadgar-i Zariran, a Zoroastrian epic story
- Frashokereti, Zoroastrian eschatology

== Bibliography ==
- Boyce, Mary AYĀDGĀR Ī JĀMĀSPĪG in Encyclopædia Iranica.
- Bailey, H.W. To the Zamasp-Namak. I. BSOS 6, 1930–32, pp. 56–68
- Bailey, H.W. To the Zamasp Namak. II. BSOS 6, (1930–32), pp. 581–600
- Olsson, Tord (1983). "The Apocalyptic Activity. The Case of Jāmāsp Nāmag". In David Hellholm (ed.). Apocalypticism in the Mediterranean World and the Near East. Tübingen: J. C. B. Mohr. ISBN 978-3-16-145386-1.
