= Salm (Shahnameh) =

Character in the Persian epic Shahnameh

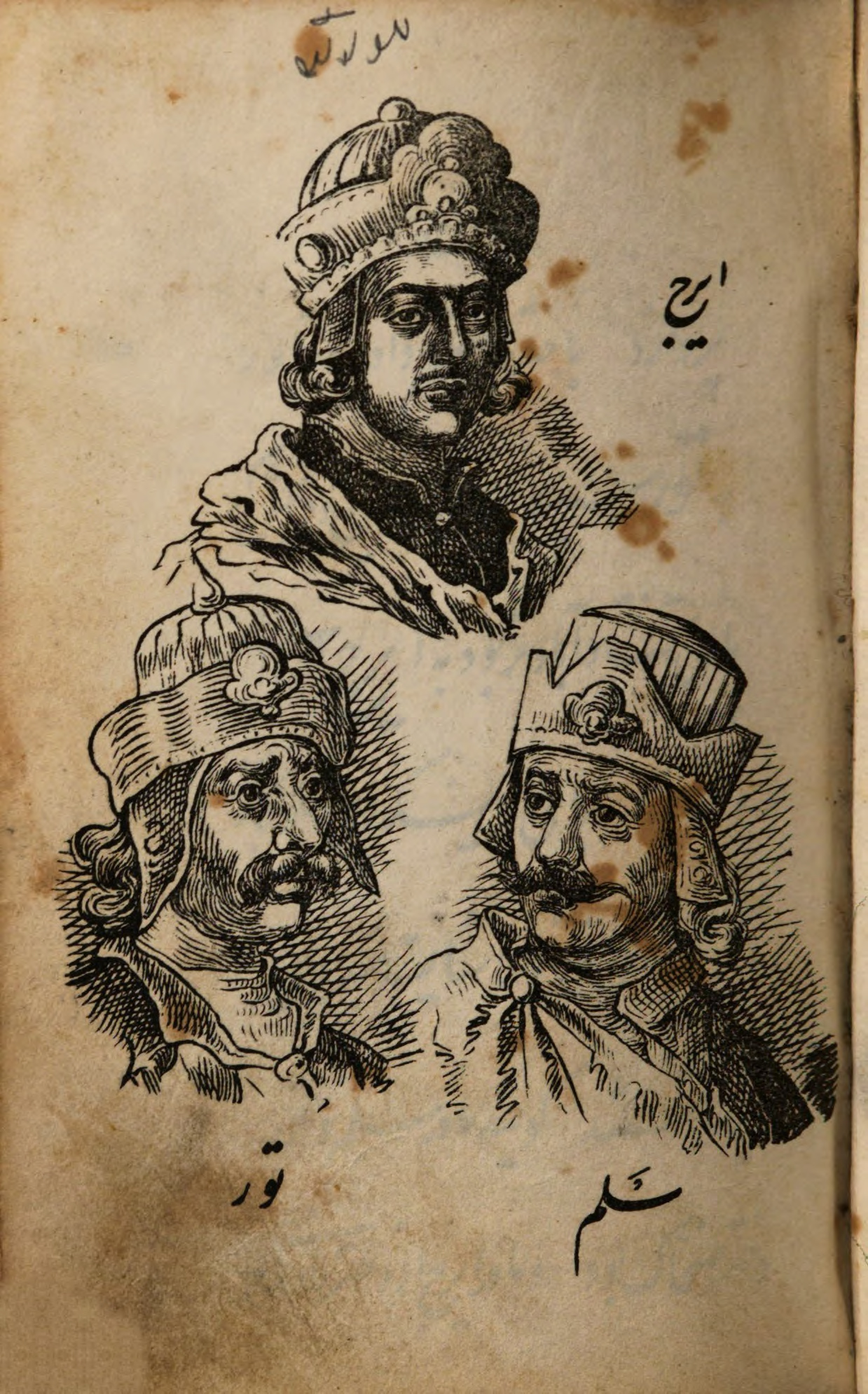
Qajar-era illustration of Salm, Iraj and Tur

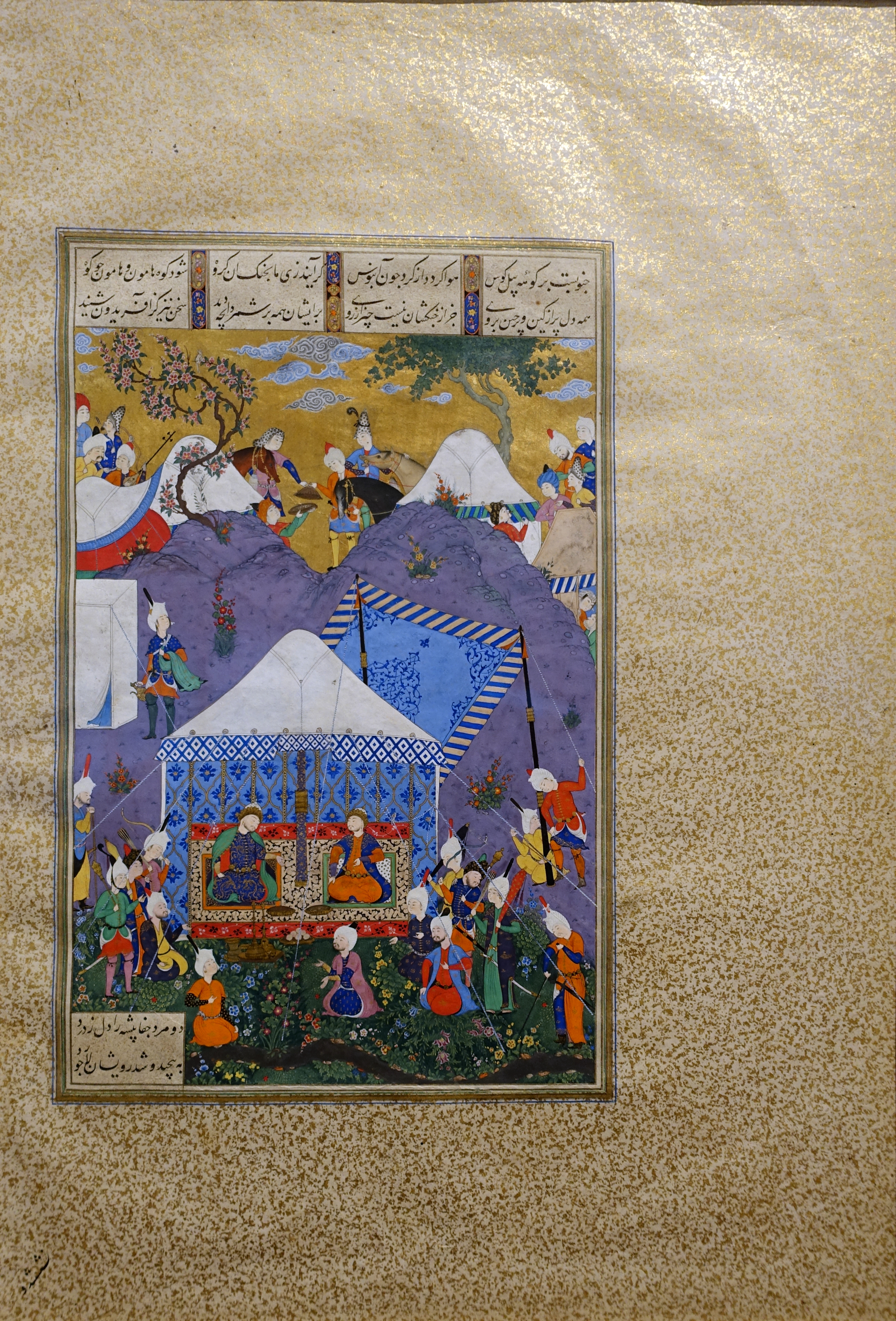
Salm and Tur receive the reply of Fereydun and Manuchehr, Miniature from the Shahnameh of Shah Tahmasp by Abd al-Aziz. Tabriz, c. 1530. Aga Khan Museum

Salm (Persian: سلم) or Sarm (Middle Persian) is a character in the Persian epic Shahnameh. He is the oldest son of legendary hero and king Fereydun. It is believed that his name was given to him by his father, after Salm chooses to seek safety and run instead of fighting the dragon that had attacked him and his brothers (the dragon was Fereydun himself who had disguised himself to test his sons).

When Fereydun decides to divide his kingdom among his sons, he gives Salm Anatolia and West. Salm and his brother Tur become jealous of their younger brother Iraj. They combine their forces against him and eventually murder the young prince. Years later Iraj’s grandson Manuchehr avenges his grandfather’s death by killing both Salm and Tur.

== Name ==
English scholar Harold Walter Bailey (1899–1996) derived the base word from Avestan sar- (to move suddenly) from tsar- in Old Iranian (tsarati, tsaru-, hunter), which also gave its name to the western Avestan region of Sairima (*salm, – *Sa^{i}rmi), and also connected it to the 10–11th century AD Persian epic Shahnameh's character "Salm".

== Family Tree ==
Arnavaz	Fereydun	Shahrnaz
Fereydun's Brother	Iraj	Salm	Tur
Pashang	Iraj's daughter
Manuchehr

== See also ==
- Sarmatians
