= House of Viseh =

Persian mythology

Shahnameh Family
- Lastname: Visehgan
- Position: Turanians in the Shahnameh
- Member: Iranians Rival
- Leadername: Viseh
- Territory Scope: Plain and desert in the Shahnameh

Other Information
- Well known: Famous for tribal and Nomadic life Turk
- Historical similarity: Scythians
- Religion: Unknown

Family members
- Lineage: Tur
- Nationality: Turkan

House of Viseh (Persian: خاندان ویسه) is the most important Turanian clan in Shahnameh and Persian mythology. They are descendants of Tur. Tur is father of Zadashm and grandfather of Viseh. Viseh is the leading member of this clan. Viseh first war with Qaren is in the Iran-Turan war, both of which are not alive in Shahnameh afterwards.

== The Visehgan family ==
Viseh has 6 sons named Houman, Barman, Nastihan, Lahhak, Farshidvard and Piran. Piran is the king of Khotan and the Minister of Afrasiab, the king of Turan. Houman is the highest ranking commander of Turanian army.

The Viseh family is different from the Afrasiab family in the Shahnameh. Viseh is a great clan of the Visehgan dynasty and the Minister of the Pashang. But in the Iran-Turan war Viseh and Afrasiab, attack together. The Vishu and Afrasiab tribes appear to be of one race and two separate tribes

All of the members of this clan were killed in the battle of Davazdah Rokh. This incident was the beginning of Turan's decline and fall.

In Avesta, the House of Viseh was eliminated by House of Nowzar, but in Shahnameh, this is House of Goudarz that eliminate this clan.

== Family tree ==
Tur
Zadashm
Viseh
Nastihan	Piran	Houman	Barman	Lahhak	Farshidvard

== Sources ==
- Ferdowsi Shahnameh. From the Moscow version. Mohammed Publishing. ISBN 964-5566-35-5
- Toqyan-e Sakayi, Mohammad Younes (2010). Khānvādahʹhā-yi Gūdarz va Pīrān dar Shāhnāmah. Tehran: Intishārāt-i Bayn al-Milalī al-Hudá. ISBN 9789644394287.
