= Viseh =

Character in Persian epic poem Shahnameh

Figure in the Shahnameh
- Name: Viseh
- Position: Lieutenant general
- Minister was: Pashang
- Leader: Turkan

Other Information
- Well known: Trapping the Nowzar family
- Participation in: Iran-Turan war
- Religion: Zoroastrianism

Family members
- Head of Tribes: House of Viseh
- Boysname: Piran, Houman; FarshVared, Pilsam; Nastihan, kalbad Barman, Lahhak
- Nationality: Turkan

Viseh (Persian: ویسه) is the son of Zadashm and grandson of Tur in the Shahnameh. He was the father of Piran and Lieutenant General, and was involved in consultations with the Iranians. After winning the Iran-Turan war, Afrasiab sent him to Pars to take over the royal family of Nowzar.

== The capture of Pars City by Viseh ==
The Iran-Turan War is the first major war between the two governments of Iran and Turan. In this war most of the allies and countries cut off Nowzar and joined Afrasiab. Turan's army was able to occupy the Iranian capital and destroy the King of Iran.

Nowzar had no more than three or four allies in the war, one of whom was the Qaren Ruler of Rey. On the third night of the war, in consultation with the Iranians, Qaren with his army departed from Nowzar castle at night to save the royal family in Pars City. According to the Shahnameh, Viseh had taken over the city of Pars and had captured the royal family.

== Sources ==
- Ferdowsi Shahnameh. From the Moscow version. Mohammed Publishing. ISBN 964-5566-35-5
