= Nastihan =

Character in the Shahnameh

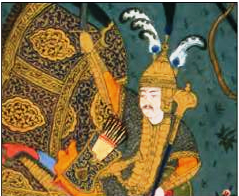

Shahnameh Men
- Name: Nastihan
- Nickname: Turanian gladiator

Other Information
- Lineage: House of Viseh
- race: Turkan Chin
- Wars: Davazdah Rokh War
- killed: Bizhan
- Historical similarity: Nomad Turk the language

Family members
- grandfather Name: Zadashm
- Father Name: Viseh
- Brothers Name: Piran, Houman; Barman, Kalbad; Ruyyin

Nastihan (Persian: نستیهن) is a Turanian hero who was involved in the Iran-Turan wars. He fled from the Battle of Homavn. Afrasiab sent Nastihan to the Iranian war after killing his other son Houman with 10,000 men.

== Nastihan presence in Shahnameh ==
Nastihan, like his brothers, left after the Iran-Turan war. His presence began when Siyâvash became a refugee in Turan. Siyâvash was received with open arms in Turan and was shown respect at the festive occasion he attended. In the Chovgan game between the Siyâvash and Afrasiab supporters, Nastihan is one of the Afrasiab supporters.

The war in the story of Davazdah Rokh is the only war in which Iranians did not understand the language of their enemies, resulting in the need for an interpreter. During the war, as described by Davazdah Rokh, the translator reported that Houman, the brother of Piran, challenged the Iranian forces to one-on-one combat and died at the hands of Bizhan.

Nastihan camped on Mount Zebed with 10,000 troops, fighting against Sepahsalar Kay Khosrow and Goudarz the chief commander. Bizhan, when he saw a Viseh flag in Nastihan's hand, targeted and killed him.

== Sources ==
- Ferdowsi Shahnameh. From the Moscow version. Mohammed Publishing. ISBN 964-5566-35-5
