= Qobád (Shahnameh) =

Qobád or Kawād is a mythical and inspiring personality

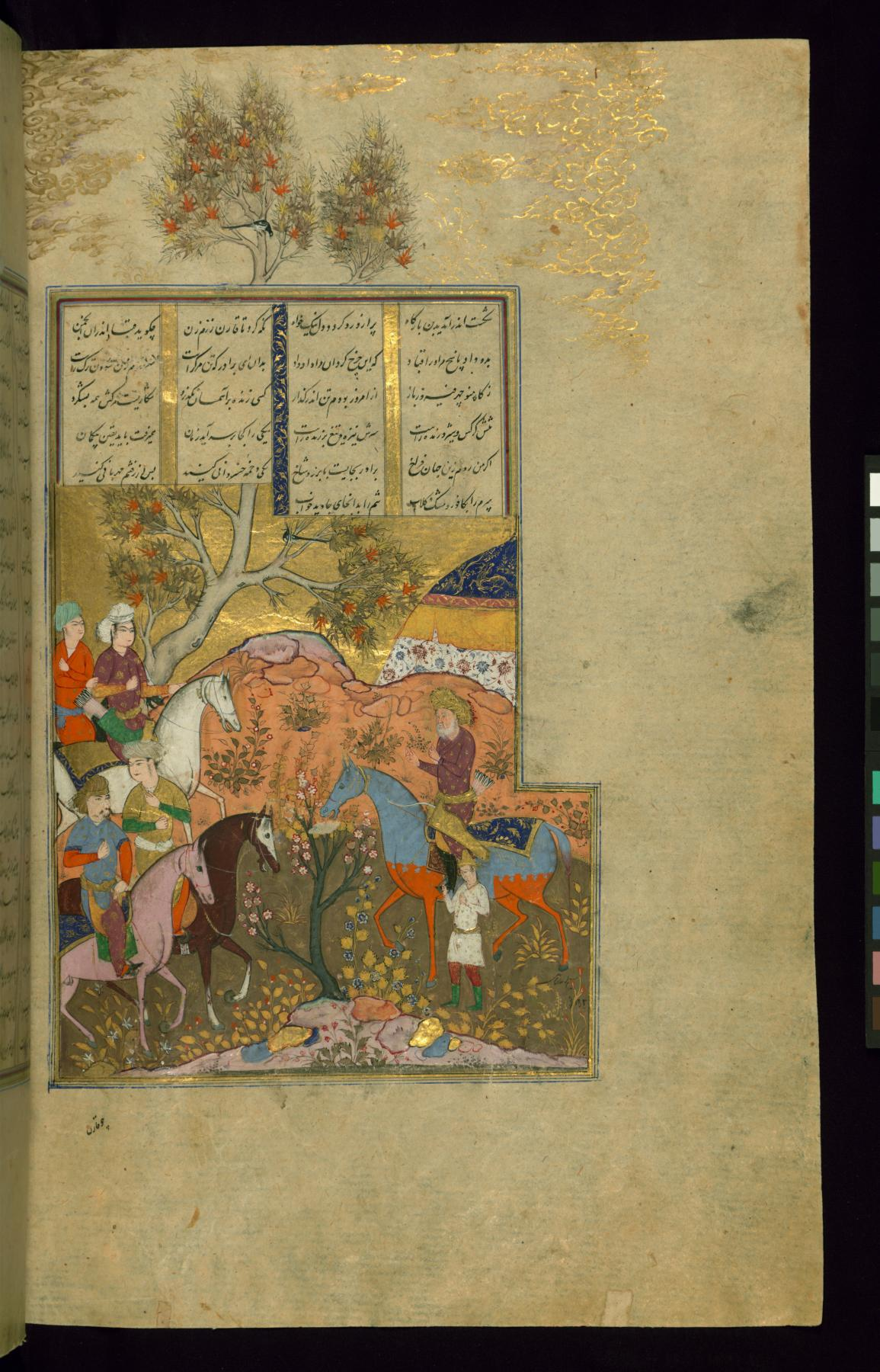
- Qubad Discusses Death before Fighting Barman

Shahnameh Men
- Name: Qobád
- Other Names: Kawād
- Nicknames: Old Qobad
- Vectors: Qaren

Other Information
- Presence: Iran-Turan war
- killed: Barman
- Religion: Zoroastrianism

Qobád (Persian: قباد) or Kawād (Persian: کواد) is a mythical and inspiring personality. He is the brother of Qaren who was the ruler of Ray under Nowzar. Qobad was an old man killed in battle with Barman.

== Battle of Old Qobad ==
Under Nowzar, the Pishdādi dynasty grows weak, and Iran In the Iran-Turan war falls by the Turanian General Afrasiab, who kills Nowzar in battle. Then however, When the Iranian army was in full siege and everyone knew the defeat was certain, Qobad boldly urged the Iranians to uplift. Barman Delaware Turani enters the battlefield and calls on the opponent. Qaren asked one of his troops to go to Barman, but no one except the volunteer Qobad. Qobad did this to persuade the Iranians not to surrender to the enemy.

== Sources ==
- Ferdowsi Shahnameh. From the Moscow version. Mohammed Publishing. ISBN 964-5566-35-5
