= Farud =

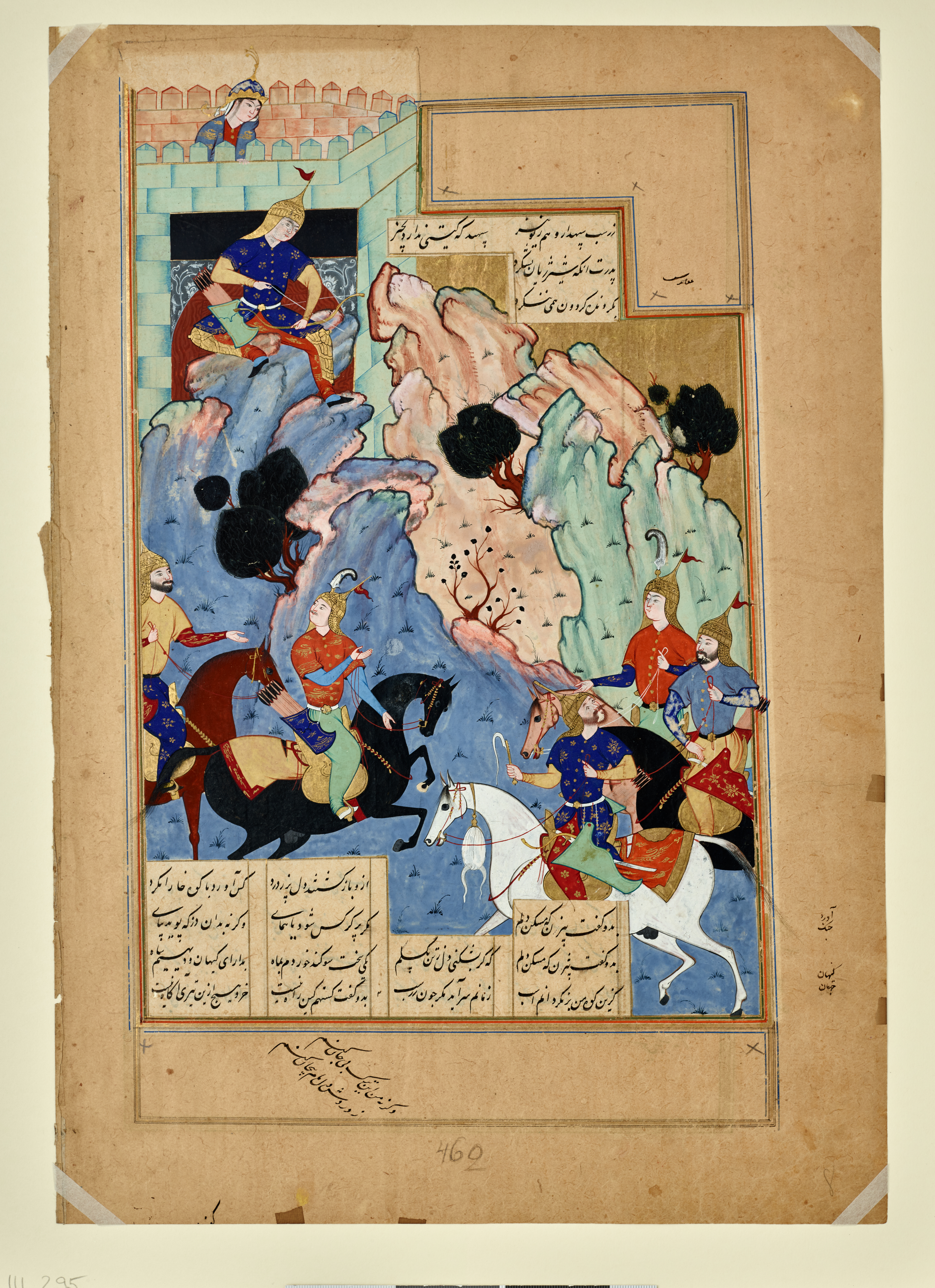
Farud, Seated at the Gate of His Mountain Fortress, Preparing to Shoot the Horse of Giv. Miniature by Siyavush Beg from the Shahnameh of Shah Ismail II. Qazvin, 1576-77. Keir Collection of Islamic Art

Farud or Forud (Persian: فرود) was an ancient king of Kelat in his early youth and makes up a chapter in the Shahnameh "The Book of Kings" (940-1020) by Ferdowsi where he is mentioned as the brother of Kai Khosrow.

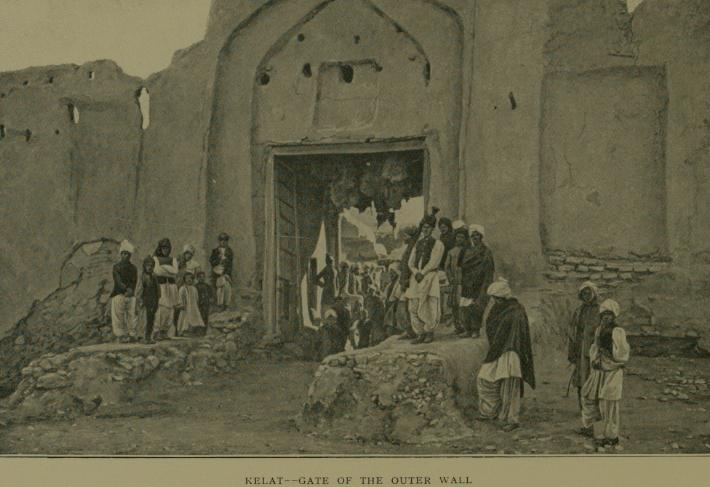
Entrance of a castle in Kelat

After becoming the ruler of ancient Iran Kai Khosrow prepared an army to seek to avenge his father's death for which he appointed nobles to take command. The nobles under whom the armies were assembled included Friburz (a noble warrior with his army), Gudarz (mentioned as a wise man in counsel together with his mighty sons on his right and left along with their armies) and Tus, who was given the responsibility by Kai Khosrow for leading the army with following instructions:

"Be obedient unto my will and lead mine army aright. I desire of thee that thou avenge the death of my father, but I desire also that thou molest none but those that fight. Have mercy upon the labourer and spare the helpless. And furthermore, I charge thee that thou pass not through the land of Kelat, but that thou leave it on one side and take thy course through the desert. For in Kelat abideth Firoud my brother, who was born of the daughter of Piran, and he dwelleth in happiness, and I would not that sorrow come nigh unto him. And he knoweth no man in Iran, not even by name, and unto no man hath he done hurt, and I desire that no harm come to him."

Tus told Kai Khosrow that he would abide by the will of the king but after days of marching the armies came to a spot where the roads parted, one towards a harsh desert void water and food and other led to Kalat. Tus suggested Gudarz to take the road to Kelat since the army needs rest and refreshments but Gudarz disagrees and instead reminds Tus of kings instructions to which Tus replied that his actions are pleasing to the king and commanded the army to march into Kelat. The desert avoided by Tus had previously been crossed by Cyrus the Great, Semiramis and Alexander the Great, all of whom are said to have lost large portions of their armies in this desert due to lack of food and water.

When Firoud got aware of a massive army marching into Kelat, he asked for suggestions of his counselor Tokhareh on the situation to which he answered that the army that marched right upon Kelat is sent by his brother seeking the avenge of their father and he does not know where the battle may take place. Listening to this, Firoud took to the hills with his men most likely thinking that the army was in Kelat for a battle. He informed his mother of the situation where he faced his own brother in the battle, she tells Firoud that there is a new Shah in Iran and he is your brother and instead of fighting he should join to avenge their father's death.

She tells Firoud to seek out Bahram (mentioned as a friend of their father and son of Gudarz) in the opposing army and also take the advice of Tokhareh after which Firoud together with Tokhareh went to a higher place of a mountain from where he could see the opposing army in a clear view through which Tokhareh let know Firoud of the warriors according to his knowledge. Tus sees them on the hills and seems to have been angered by this act in reaction to which he tells Bahram if they are an army lash them two hundred times and if they are Turks or spies, blind them and bring them to him to be destroyed. When Bahram goes towards the mountain to check upon them, Firoud seems to have been angered towards the opposing army for thinking less of him. However, Tokhareh asks Firoud not to be angry and he does not know the name of the person but knows his father Gudarz and he is his son.

As Bahram nears the heights, he asks the men of why they are watching to which Firoud tells him to not think of him any less, watch his tongue and answer his questions and Bahram listens. However, after getting to know that it is the Bahram his mother had talked about, he says that there is none among all the host of Iran that his eyes would rather look upon, Bahram recognizes Firoud's authority, pays homage, takes his offer of feast for the army and recognizes Firoud as from the race of Kayanians.

Although Bharam had let Tus know of the situation and Firoud's offer to lead and march against Turan, Tus still seems to be angry, refuses to take Bahram's words, tells him that he would perish this young Turk and assembles the army. But Bahram interrupts and says the following:

"Ye know not that he sendeth you forth against Firoud, who is brother unto Kai Khosrow, and sprung from the seed of Saiawush. I counsel you have the fear of the Shah before your eyes, and lift not your hands in injustice against his brother."

After listening to this the warriors went back in their tents but Tus's anger was not gone. On the request of his son in law Rivniz (mentioned as a knight of great cunning) he let him go after Firoud but was killed by him and after Tus called upon his son Zerasp to avenge Rivzin's blood but was killed by Firoud, sending Tus a message that he was a man not to be treated with dishonor. After this Tus's anger fueled even more and this time he goes after Firoud himself to which Tokhareh suggest not to fight or kill this man as he is known warrior (mentioned as a lion and crocodile) as his death may invite more revenge and fierce battle between the armies. But Firoud refuses and instead kills the horse by the suggestions of Tokhareh so that the message is sent with minimum consequences.

This act angered the nobles of the opposing army even further and Firoud doubts their intelligence and remains confused by the hostile confrontation with his brother's army and doubts their intelligence to differentiate between good and evil. Gew (son of Gudarz) was sent against Firoud but he killed his horse too, after which Gew's son Byzun was sent whose horse was killed too and Firoud went in the castle and Byzun taunts his action for not keeping the fight.

Tus is still angered, calls Firoud a Turk, wishes to avenge the blood that he had spilled. Now the day passed and darkness took over, Firoud strengthens the castle while his mother is concerned about him and had dream evil portent. Listening to his mother, Firoud says the following:

"Woe unto thee, my mother, for I know it is not given unto thee to cease from shedding tears of sorrow. For verily I shall perish like unto my father, in the flower of my youth. Yet will I not crave mercy of these Iranians."

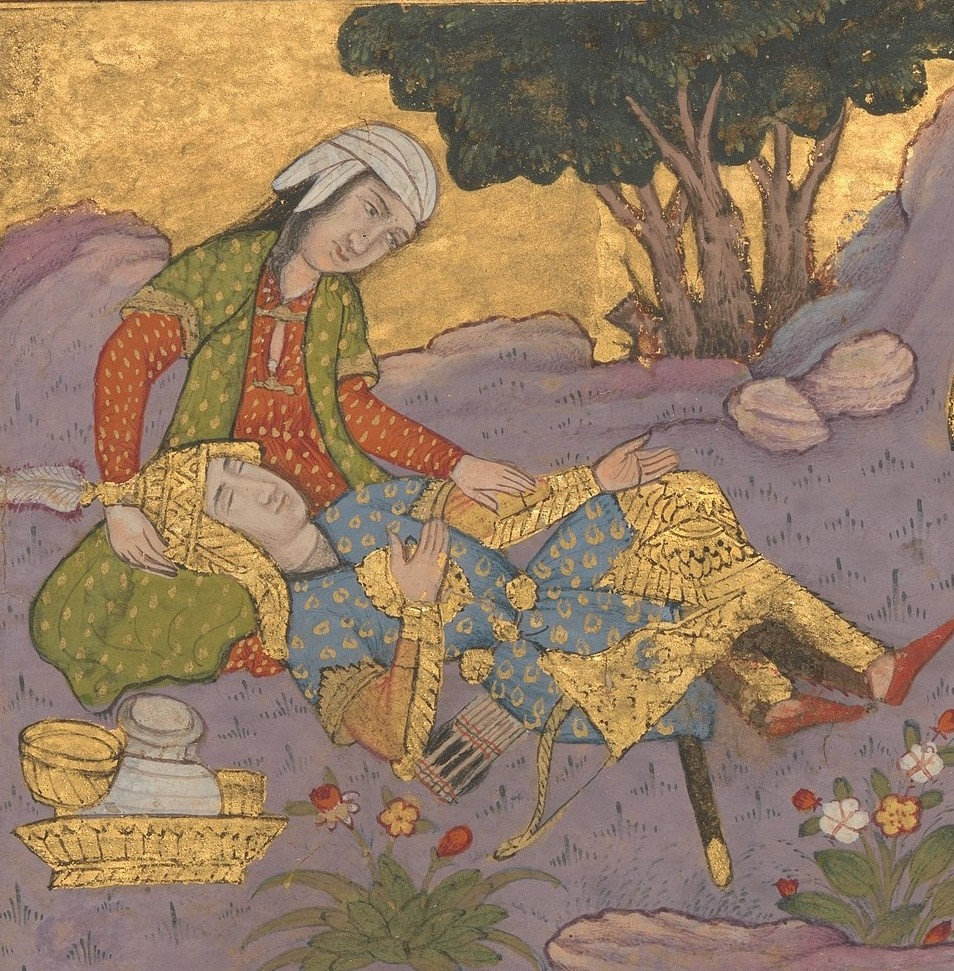
Jarira and dying Farud

As the morning arrived, the fighting resumed and Firoud led his warriors in the mountains where extreme battle took place and Firoud made havoc among his enemies and they beheld that Firoud was a lion in the fight. But the young Firoud was now rounded up by Rehham and Byzun but he fought on and was hit with a mighty club by Rehham from behind. Firoud could see his last minutes and returned to his mother who cries after seeing her son in his condition but Firoud tells her to keep her silence while he spoke his last words to his mother which are the following:

"Weep not, for the time suffereth it not. For the Iranians follow fast upon me, and they will enter and take this house, and do violence unto thee and to thy women. Go out, therefore, and cast you from off the walls into the abyss, that death may come upon you, and that Byzun when he entereth find none alive. As for me, my moments are but few, for the heroes of Iran have murdered the days of my youth."

The women did as commanded, except his mother. She sat beside him until he took his last breath then she burnt all his treasures, killed the horses and returning to her son's feet, she pierced her body with a sword.

After breaking into the castle and seeing Farud and his mother on the floor, the Iranians had tears in their eye and sorrowed for Tus's anger and feared Kai Khoswor's wrath. Gudarz soon regrets what had happened and tells Tus that he had been wrong and had caused death of a young Kaianide and his own sons.

== Family tree ==
Viseh
Kay Kavus	Piran	Houman	Barman
Siyâvash	Jarireh
Farud

== See also ==
- Kai Khosrow
- Baluch people
- Baluchi music
- Iranian peoples
- Ancient Persia
