= Ashkash =

Persian mythological hero of the epic poem Shahnameh

- Name: Ashkash
- position: Governor of Makran
- Nickname: of seven heroes
- Banner: Leopard

Other Information
- Well known: General of Kuch and Baloch army
- Attendance at: Davazdah Rokh, Makran, and Turan battles
- Wars: Davazdah Rokh war Great Kay Khosrow war

Family members
- Father: Farhadan
- Nationality: Iran

Ashkash (Note: Persian: اشکش, Balochi: اشکش) is a major figure in the Iranian epic poem Shahnameh. He is introduced by Ferdowsi as the general of Kay Khosrow's army.

He is depicted as an Iranian hero from the Kayanian dynasty, tasked by Kay Khosrow to governor of Makran. during Kay Khosrow's campaign against Turan to avenge the death of Siyavash, he commanded the Kuch and Baloch army from Makran.

== Origins ==
Ashkash led a group called Fereydounid, who were among the heroes of Kay Khosrow. He may have been among the princes of the Parthian era, each of whom had their own army and banner, but who were obedient to the king.

There have been several other mentions of the name Ashkash from the region. In the Mojmal al-Tawarikh (p. 91), Ashkash, son of Kay Kawad is mentioned as one of the 1200 generals of Kay Khosrow. Al-Tabari and al-Biruni cite Ashkan ibn Ash in his mention of the Parthian kings.

== Narrative ==
Ashkash was one of the seven Iranian men who went to Turan with the mythological hero Rostam to free Bizhan, and was present in many battles. In Khwarazm, he forced Shideh to flee and was appointed as the ruler of Makran by the order of Kay Khosrow.

=== Bizhan's rescue from the Turan dungeon ===
One of his most important roles is in the story of Bizhan and Manizhe, where Gorgin becomes envious of Bizhan's bravery and seduces him to go to Turan. There, Bizhan finds Manizhe and they fell in love. But Afrasiyab arrests Bizhan and imprisons him. Kay Khosrow gave the order to release Bizhan with special powers to Rostam and Ashkash

This is depicted in the mythological part of the Shahnameh, a prose work written in Middle Persian:

"To lead the host Ruhham, Farhad, two men of valour and Ashkash, that lion-hero."

=== Ashkash, the general of the Kuch and Baloch ===
Ashkash is introduced in several verses in the Shahnameh as the commander of the Kuch and Baloch armies. The army led a campaign against Turan, which to avenge the death of Siyavash.

This is depicted in the mythological part of the Shahnamah, a prose work written in Middle Persian:

"Next after Gostaham came shrewd Aškash endowed with prudent heart and ready brain
An army of warriors of the Kuch and Baloch
Scheming war like the fighting-ram No one in the world has seen [them turn] their backs
No one has seen [as much as] one of their fingers unarmed
They have brought a banners with the figure of a leopard from whose banners war rained down."

According to the Shahnameh, the army of Kuch and Baloch armored from head to foot, on whose helmets stood a crest like a cock's comb, and they had the banner with the figure of leopard.

== History ==
In Kay Khosrow's war with the Turanians, Ashkash was the commander and leader of an army. Later, Ashkash was the leader of the army in the Persian campaign against Turan under the command of Fariburz. When Rostam set out for Turan to rescue Bizhan, Ashkash was one of the seven men who accompanied Rostam. Afterward, Ashkash was the general of the army, and he fought with Garsivaz.

He was present at Kay Khosrow's consultation to confront Afrasiab. While at the consultation, Kay Khosrow assigned him to fight against Shideh in Khwarazm with 30,000 spearmen. After he defeated Shideh in Khwarazm, Kay Khosrow sent him to Zam to prevent Afrasiab from attacking the rear of the Iranian army. Ashkash was also with Kaykhosrow in the Battle of Makran. There, Kay Khosrow appointed him the governor of Makran.

== See also ==
- Baloch people in Iran
- Shahnameh
  - List of Shahnameh characters
