= Barman (Shahnameh) =

Turanian hero

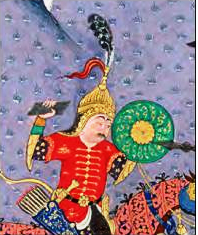
- Barman knocks Qobád back with a brick

Shahnameh Men
- Name: Barman
- Nickname: Turanian gladiator

Other Information
- Wars: Iran-Turan war Rostam and Sohrab; Davazdah Rokh War
- killes: Rohham
- killer: Qobád
- Historical similarity: Nomad Turk the language

Family members
- Father Name: Viseh
- Brothers: Piran, Houman; Nastihan, kalbad
- race: Turkan
- Lineage: House of Viseh

Bârmân (Persian: بارمان) is a Turanian hero in the Shahnameh.

In the time of Nowzar, the Great War of Iran and Turan took place. In this war, Barman was one of the commanders of the Turanian leader Afrasiab. The Iran-Turan war happened after Manuchehr's death. Until then, Turan did not dare attack Iran. But after the death of Manuchehr Turanians had an opportunity to attack Iran. The King of Iran was killed in the attack and a large part of the country was occupied.

== Barman and Qobád ==
In the Iran-Turan War that resulted in the annihilation of Nowzar Shah of Iran and the conquest of the country, Barman fought and killed Qobad, the son of Kaveh Ahangar. Barman was later killed by Qobad's brother Qaren.

== Bârmân wars ==
Barman at book Shahnameh appears in wars in two periods, and relatively long time apart. The first period is in the time of Nozar, and the second period is in the time of Kay Khosrow. There was another war of Davazdah Rokh in the time of Kay khosrow, in which Barman was killed by Rohham.

Barman, along with Houman, are the names of two Turan brave men in Shahnameh who were commissioned by Afrasiab to prevent Sohrab from approaching his Rostam in a war that. This act led to a fierce battle between Sohrab and Rostam, which ended with the murder of Sohrab.

== Gallery ==
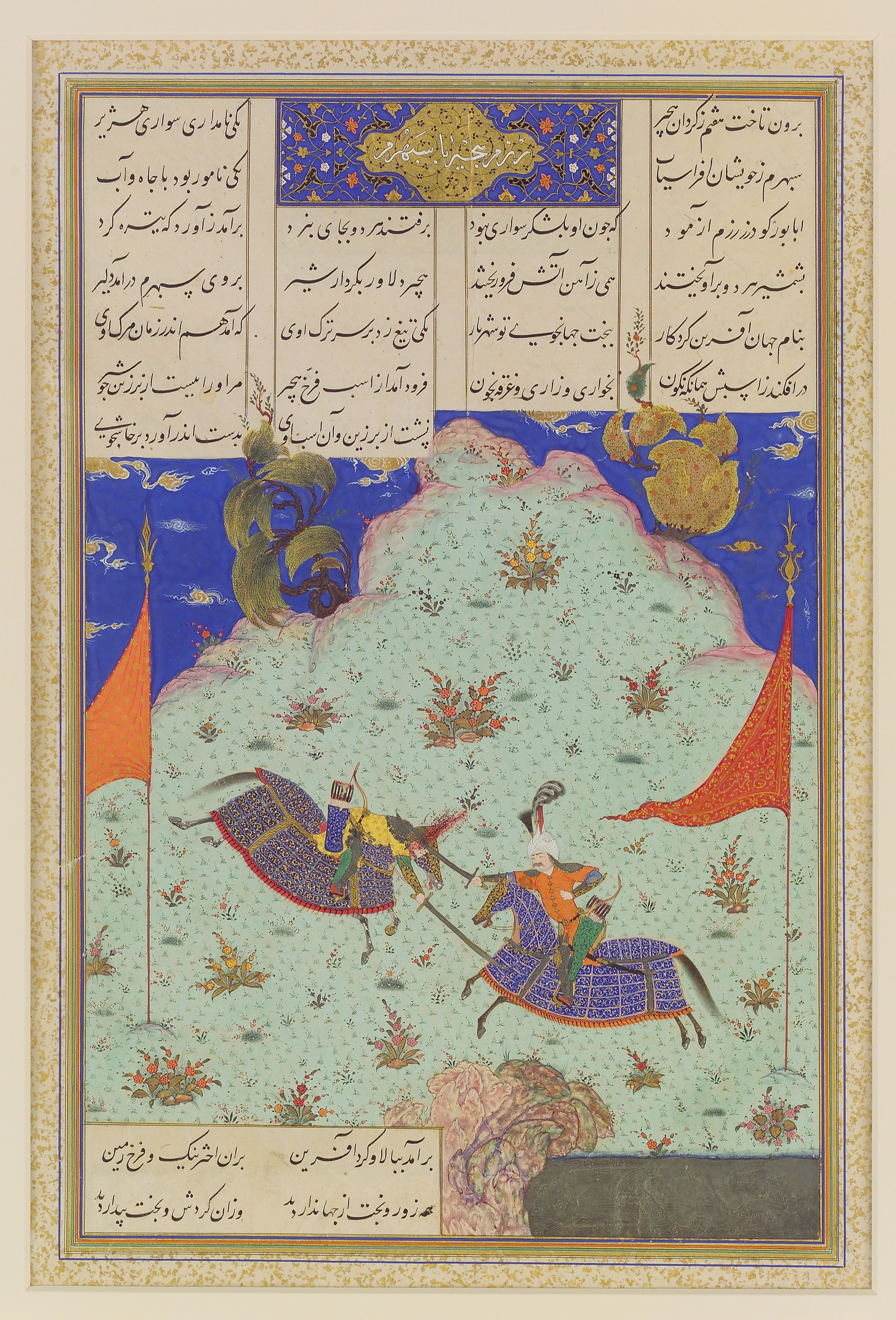
Ruhham Versus Barman

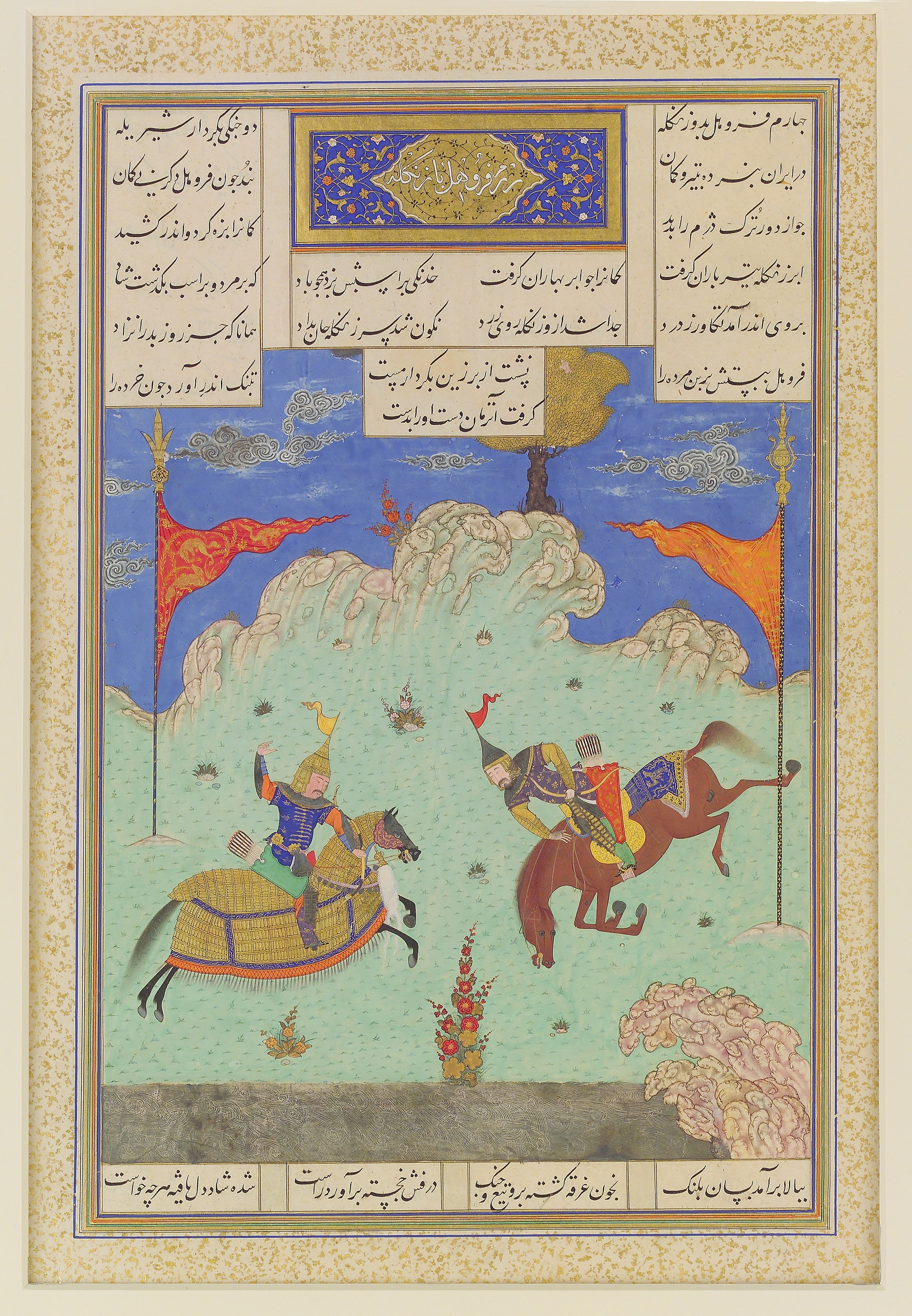
Rohham Versus Barman

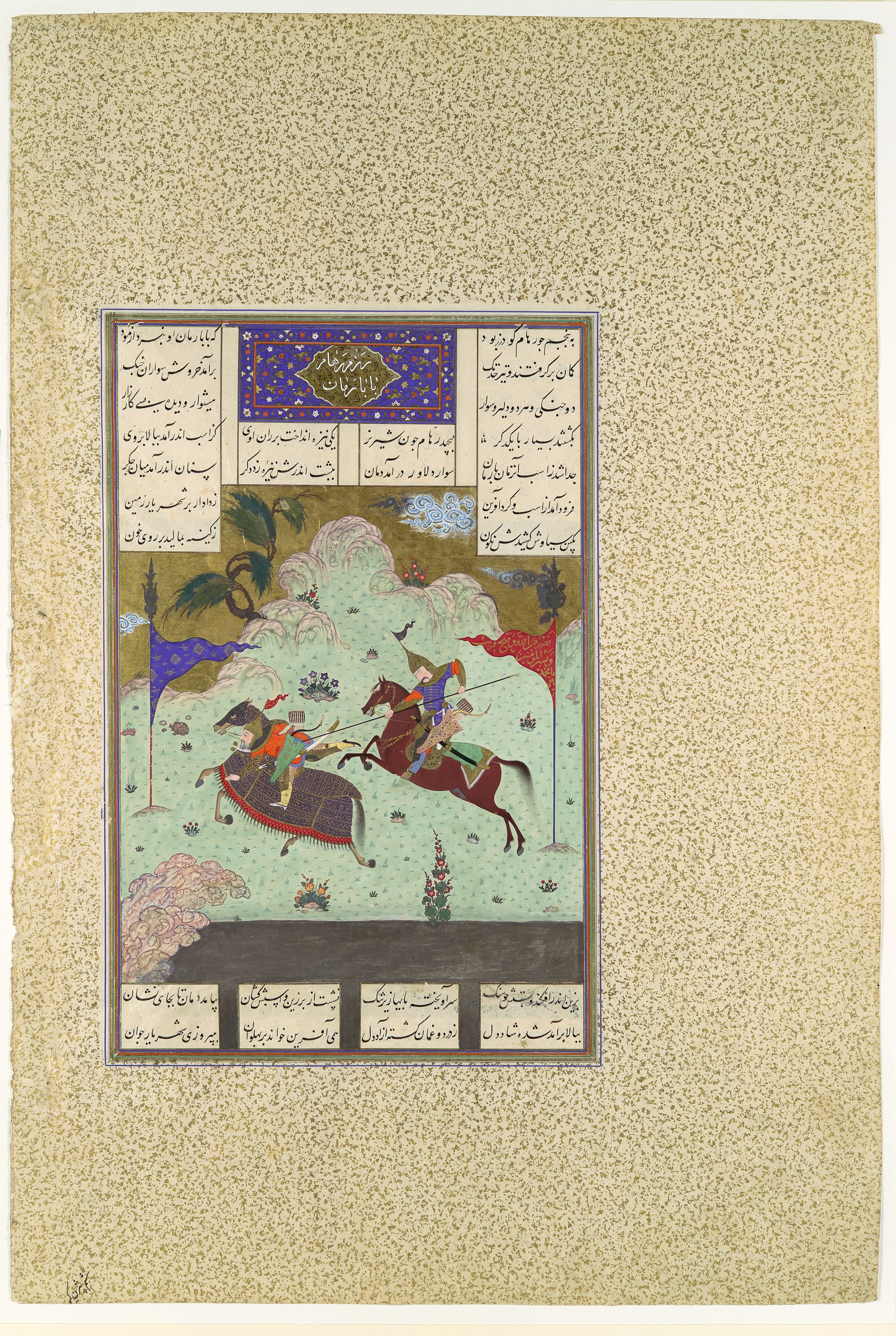
The Fifth Joust of the Rooks- Rohham Versus Barman

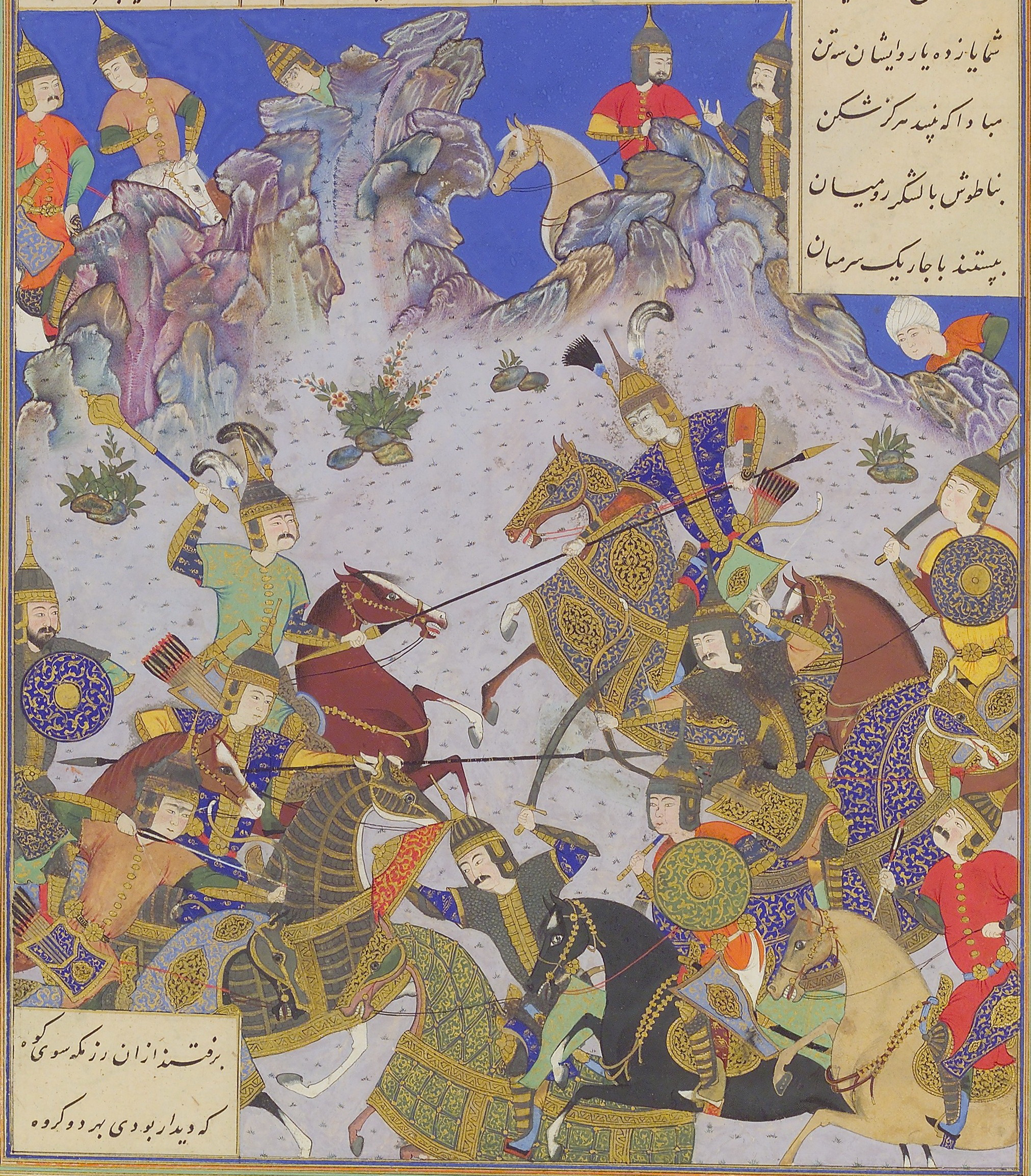
The war between Rohham and Barma

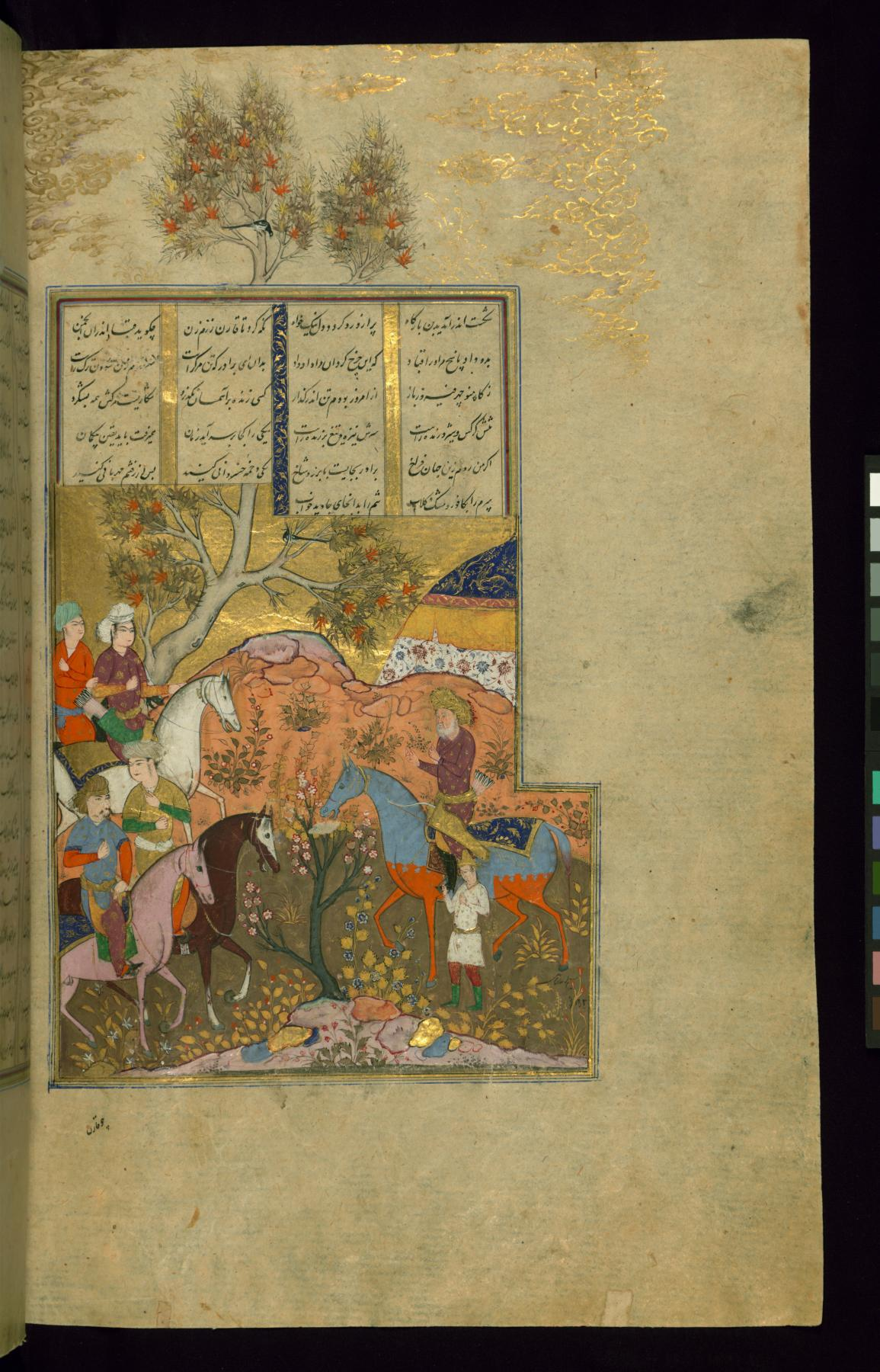
Battle of Barman and the Old Qobad

== Sources ==
- Ferdowsi Shahnameh. From the Moscow version. Mohammed Publishing. ISBN 964-5566-35-5
