= Aghrirat =

Character in Shahnameh and Iranian mythology

Aghrirat (Persian: اَغْریرَتْ) or Aghrirath (Persian: اَغْریرَثْ) is a famous Turanian character in Shahnameh and Iranian mythology. He and Piran Veyse are the only Turanians that are described positively in Iranian mythology. Aghrirat is son of Pashang and brother of Afrasiab and Garsivaz. Unlike Afrasiab, Aghrirat is kind and gentle. Although mostly unsuccessful, he tries to put an end to hostilities between Iran and Turan and bring peace to both countries.
