= Sudabeh =

Character in the Persian epic Shahnameh

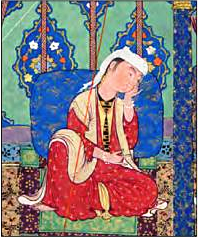
- Painting of Sudabeh in The Shahnama of Shah Tahmasp

Shahnameh women
- Name: Sudabeh
- Post: Princess

Other Information
- Well known: Husband protection against father
- Killed By: Rostam

Family members
- Father: King Hamavaran
- Husbands: Kay Kāvus
- Nationality: Hamavaran

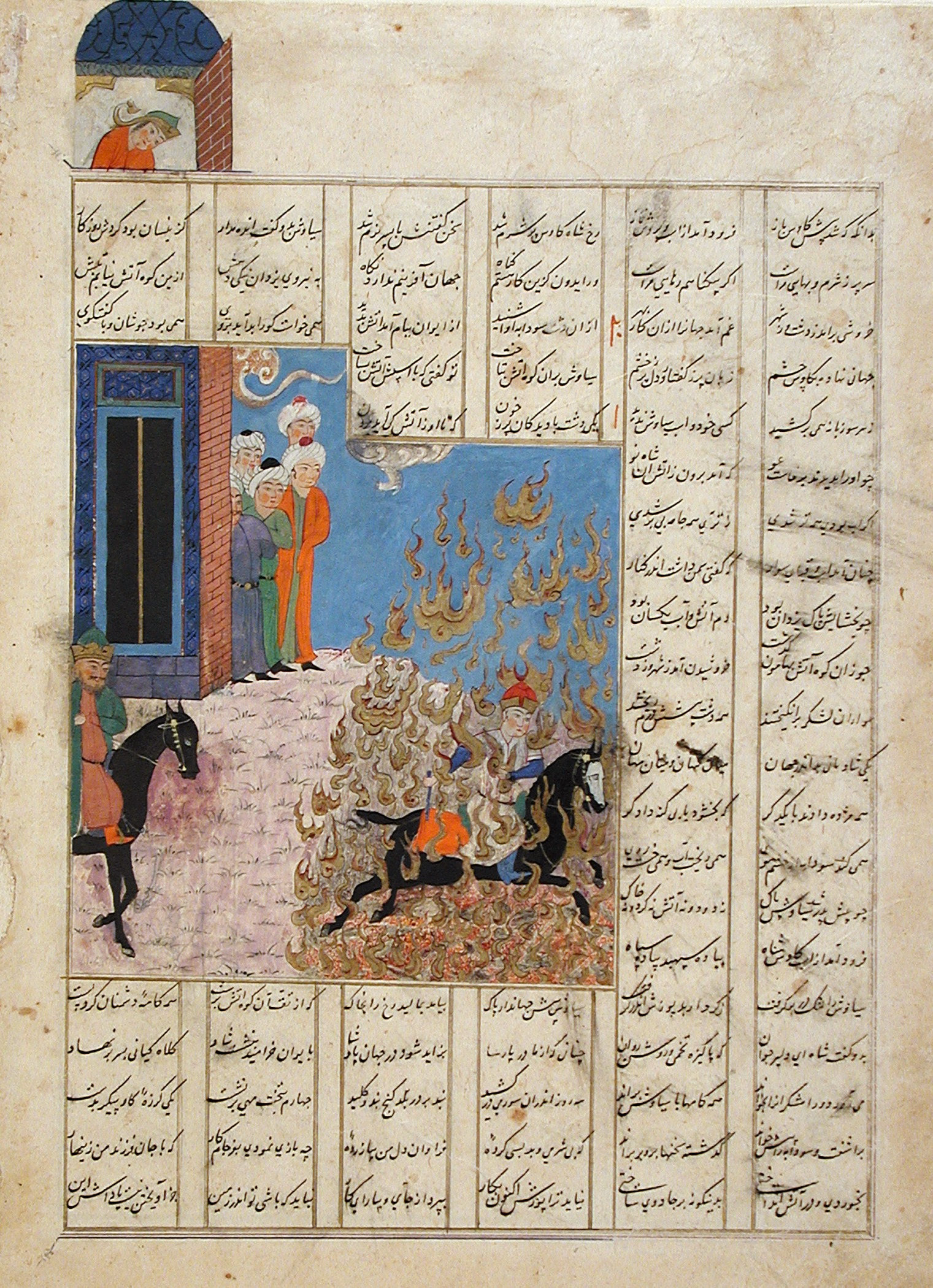
The court watches Siyâvash - falsely accused by Sudabeh - undertake ordeal by fire to prove his innocence of her rape

Sudabeh or Sodaba (Persian: سودابه) is a character in the Persian epic Shahnameh. She was princess of Hamavaran kingdom and later, becomes the wife of Kay Kāvus, King of Iran, and stepmother to prince Siyavash.

== The Story of Sudabeh ==
According to Shahnamah, a man from Syria and Egypt started a rebellion against Kay Kāvus. During that time Kay Kāvus was in Sistan. After he heard about the rebellion, he prepared an army and went through the sea to stop the rebellion. He reached a place where Hamavaran (identified as the land of Himyar) was in front of him and the sea was behind it. Egypt was in his left while Barbarstan (probably Sudan or Somalia) was in his right. He was confronted by the king of Hamavaran (in Arab traditions, the king of Hamavaran was Dhul-Adhar). The king of Hamavaran surrendered and made an agreement with Kay Kāvus to obey his orders and to send him gold but only if Kay Kāvus went out of the land of Hamavaran. Kay Kāvus agreed and returned to Iran.

One of the guards advised Kay Kāvus to marry the daughter of the king of Hamavaran whose name was Sudabeh and described to him how beautiful she was. Kay Kāvus sent to the king of Hamavaran telling him that he wants to marry his daughter and threatened him that he would not let him rule if he refused. The king of Hamavaran asked his daughter, Sudabeh, if she would agree to marry Kay Kāvus. Sudabeh agreed to marry Kay Kāvus and so the king of Hamavaran sent his daughter to Kay Kāvus with gifts that were made out of gold.

The king of Hamavaran wasn't happy about his daughter, after one week he sent to Kay Kāvus asking him to visit him in Hamavaran. Sudabeh felt her father intention was to capture Kay Kāvus. She told Kay Kāvus not to go, but he refused and went to Hamavaran. The king of Hamavaran welcomed him and let him in one of the cities of Hamavaran called Shahah which was full of gold tracery. He served Kay Kāvus until the Iranians who were Kay Kavus trusted him. The king of Hamavaran conspired with Barbarstan and captured Kay Kāvus and killed the Iranians who were with him with the help of Barbarstan. He locked Kay Kāvus in a palace that was in a very high place. He then sent men dressed as women to Iran to bring Sudabeh. Sudabeh tore her clothes and slapped her face when she knew about what happened to her husband. The king of Hamavaran then sent her to the palace where Kay Kāvus is held and locked her with him.

The story of the treachery of the king of Hamavaran spread throughout the region until it reached Afrasiab who prepared an army and took over Iran. The Iranians then escaped Iran, most of them went to Zabulistan. They told Rostam about what happened. He cried and promised to bring Kay Kāvus back from Hamavaran. The army of Hamavaran united with the army of Egypt and Barbarstan. Rostam was able to destroy all the army. The king of Hamavaran surrendered and made an agreement with Rostam to give him Kay Kāvus and Sudabeh but only if Rostam let him and the king of Egypt and Barbarstan go, Rostam agreed. The army of Egypt, Barbarstan and Hamavaran joined Rostam army went to fight against Afrasiab.

Sudabeh is mostly famous for her role in Siyavash choosing exile. When young Siavash, who was raised by Rostam away from his father's Palace, returns, Sudabeh sees him and is instantly overwhelmed with lust (or, more charitably, love) for him. She tricks Siavash into going to her private palace in order to visit his sisters. There she reveals her real intention to him and tries to seduce him. Siyavash resists her and refuses to betray his father. Sudabeh, who is disappointed, tries to manipulate her husband and turn him against his son. After much conflict, Siyavash decides to leave his father's Palace for good and goes to Turan. After Siyavash is assassinated in Turan, Rostam, who blames Sudabeh for the incident, murders her.

== The story of the murder of Sudabeh ==
When Siyavash took refuge in Turan, everyone thought that Siyavash had left Iran to get rid of Sudabeh. Siyavash was brutally murdered in Turan, and because Rostam had nursed Siyavash for many years and had prepared him for succession to the Iranian monarchy, he became distraught and blamed Sudabeh. When he heard about Siyavash's death in Zabol, he came to Iran. The palace was very inflamed, and Rostam went out from Kavus without permission, pulled Sudabeh out of the palace, and killed her in public.

== See also ==
- Potiphar's wife

== Sources ==
- Ferdowsi Shahnameh. From the Moscow version. Mohammed Publishing. ISBN 964-5566-35-5
