= Zaav =

Mythical Iranian king

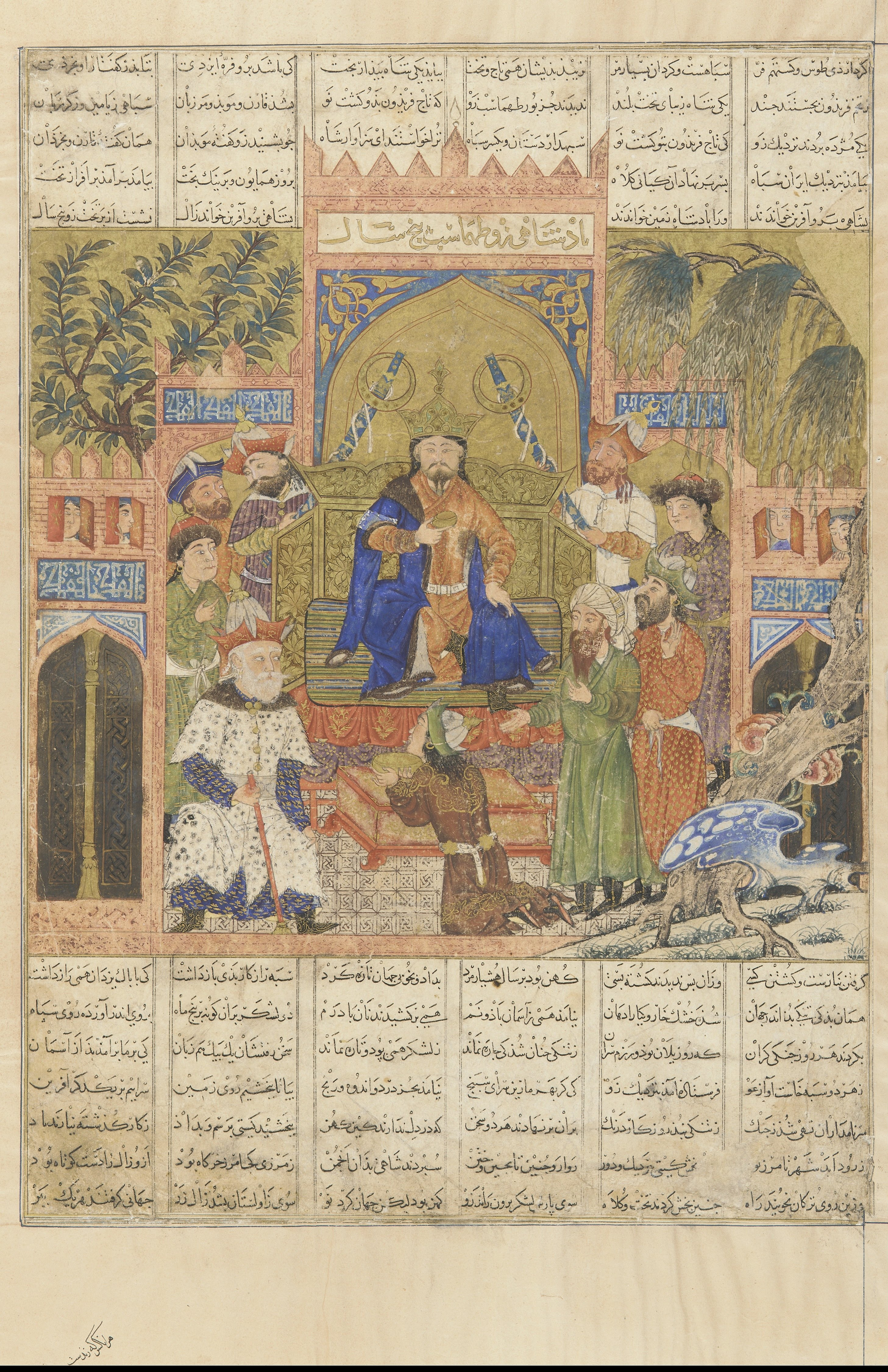
"Enthronement of Shah Zav", Folio from the Great Mongol Shahnameh. Created in Tabriz between 1330-1340

Zaav, Zav, Zaab, or Zou (Persian: زاو or زو) is the tenth Shah of the Pishdadian dynasty of Persia according to Shahnameh. He was a descendant of Nowzar and ruled over Iran for about five years.

According to the Shahnameh, his reign brought about an era of justice in Iran during a time of rampant military crimes caused by the war with Afrasiab. Because of widespread famine, Afrasiab wished to conclude the war as soon as possible and an agreement was reached where Turan was given the rights to all the land across the Oxus in exchange for peace. During the rest of his reign, Zav lead Iran during an era of renewed prosperity before dying at the age of 86.

Al-Tabari says that Zaav's reign was characterized by administrative and infrastructural restoration. During his rule, he directed the reconstruction of key sites in Khunarath and Babylon that had been damaged under Afrasiab, including the repair of destroyed fortresses. He also ordered the clearance and dredging of blocked streams, conduits, and watercourses to restore regional irrigation systems. Additionally, Zaw instituted a seven-year remittance of the land tax.

11th century historian Gardizi says that Zaav also dug a canal leading from Armenia toward the Tigris River and created channels in the Sawad (fertile plain of Iraq), which they call the Zab River.

Preceded by Nowzar	Legendary Kings of the Shāhnāma; 2427–2432 (after Keyumars)	Succeeded by Garshasp
