= Askani (tribe) =

Baloch tribe from Balochistan

Askani (also known as Ashkani) is a Baloch tribe from Balochistan. They are also found in Balochistan, Pakistan.

== People ==
- Akbar Askani
- Liaquat Ali Askani
- Haji Noor Muhammad Zamurani
- Mir Noor Ahmed Zamurani
- Mir Lakhmir Zamurani

== Name ==
The Ferdowsi poem says that the army of Ashkash was from the wanderers of the Koch and Baloch, intent on war, with exalted cockscomb crest, whose back none in the world ever saw.

== See also ==
- Baloch people
- Ashkash
