= Houman =

Turanian hero in Shahnameh

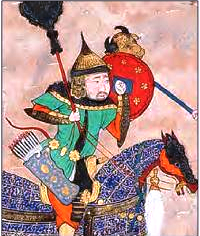
In the Shahnameh of Shah Tahmasp.

Houmān (Persian: هومان) (alt. spellings include Hōmān, Humān and Hoomān) is one of the most famous Turanian heroes in Shahnameh, the national epic of Greater Iran. Houmān is famous for his bravery, loyalty, and chivalry, such that even Iranians who are longtime enemies of Turanians admire his personality. He is a descendant of Tur, a son of Viseh and brother of Piran. Houmān is the highest ranking Turanian commander and after Piran, he is the second leading member of Viseh clan. Human first appears in the story of Rostam and Sohrab, where Afrasiab sends him with an army of 12,000 men to accompany Sohrab in his journey to Iran. He has been instructed by Afrasiab to not let Sohrab recognize his father, Rostam, so that they fight together and one of them kill the other. Rostam on the deathbed of Sohrab, agreed to promise that he would not hurt Houmān and his army.

Houmān did not take part in the story of Siyâvash and he was not present there when Afrasiab ordered to kill Siyâvash. However, he fights with Iranian army in the subsequent wars between Iran and Turan.

He was killed by Bizhan in the story of Davazdah Rokh.

Beside Shahnameh, he has been also mentioned in other sources such as Jahāngirnāmeh and Tabari. Tabari mentions his name as "Khomān".

== Family tree ==
Viseh
Kay Kavus	Piran	Houmān	Barman
Siyâvash	Jarireh
Farud
