= Piran Viseh =

Iranian mythical figure

Piran e Viseh (Persian: پیرانِ ویسه, lit. 'Piran son of Viseh') is a Turanian figure in Shahnameh, the national epic of Greater Iran. Beside Shahnameh, Piran is also mentioned in other sources such as Tabari and Tha'ālibī. He is the king of Khotan and the spahbed of Afrasiab, the king of Turan. He is described as a wise and intelligent man, seeking to bring peace to Iran and Turan. In old Iranian writings, Piran and Aghrirat are the only Turanians that have been described positively. Piran plays a vital role in the story of Siavash, the story of Kay Khosro and the story of Bizhan and Manizhe. Piran was killed by Goudarz in the battle of Davazdah Rokh. Kay Khosro mourned the death of Piran and ordered to wash his body with Musk and Ambergris and be buried in the cave of Zibad. In Persian culture, Piran is a symbol of wisdom. It has been said that Karim Khan called Mohammad Khan Qajar "Piran Viseh". Piran is often compared to Bozorgmehr.

According to djalal khaleghi motlagh, Piran may be the Median Harpagus that saved Cyrus the Great.

According to the book of Dr Abas Zamani Piran was buried in the cave of Zibad now called DarSufa Pir.

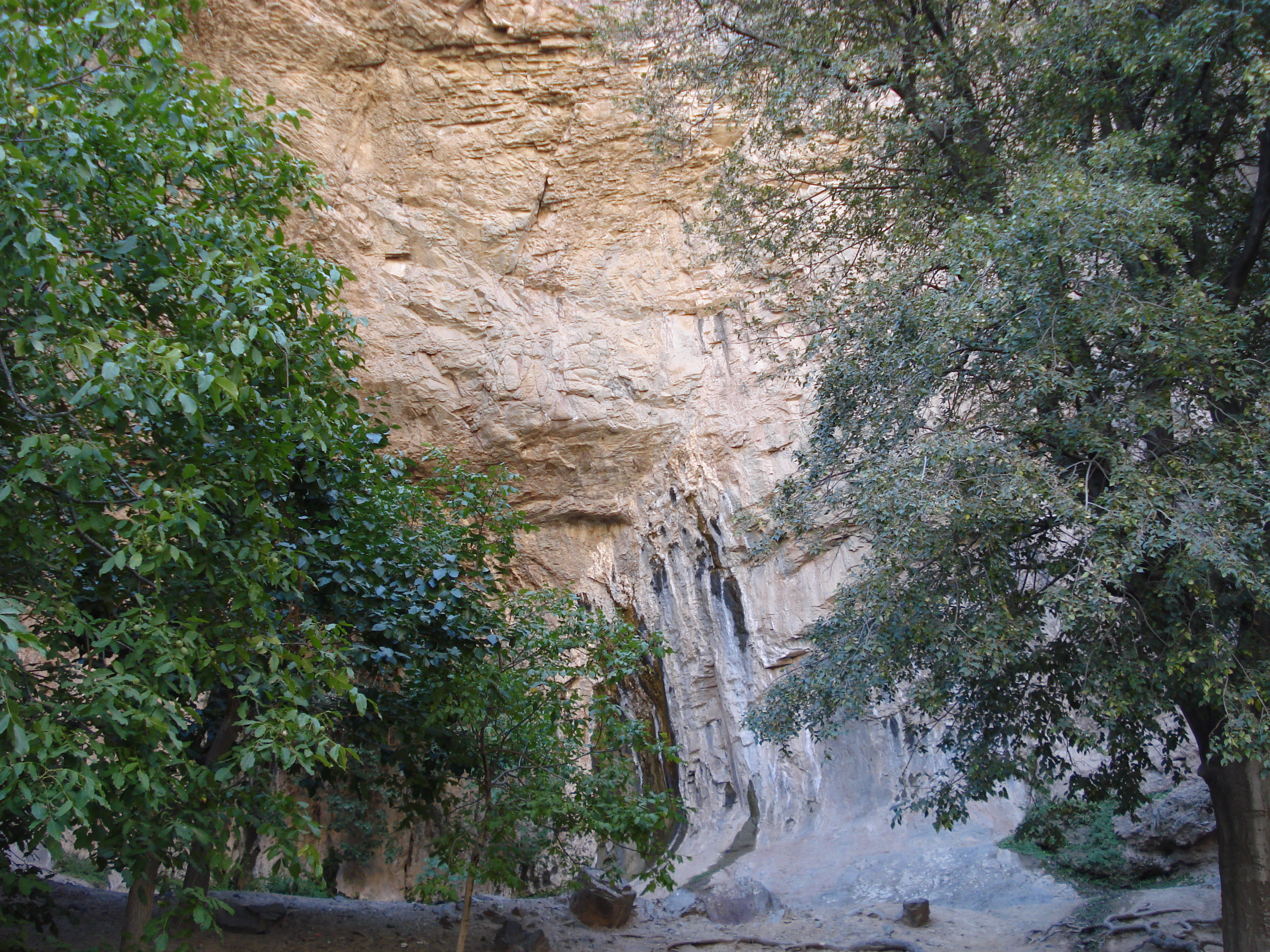
Dar e Sufa.

According to Patrice Lajoye, Piran may not have been a real historical figure at all, but rather a euhemerized thunder deity descended from the Proto-Indo-European Perkwunos, whose name is cognate with the Slavic Perun and Sanskrit Parjanya.

== Family tree ==
Viseh
Kay Kavus	Piran	Houman	Barman
Siyâvash	Jarireh
Farud

== See also ==
- Zibad
- Davazdah Rokh
