= Zadashm =

King of Turan

Zadashm (Persian: زادشم) is the king of Turan in Ferdowsi's Shahnameh. He is the son of Tur, grandson of Fereydun, father of Pashang and grandfather of Afrasiab.

According to the epic, Zadashm kept peace with the land of Iran throughout his reign, so that scholar Susan Fotoohi summarized his character as a "calm soul". In the poem Afrasiab criticized this non-aggressive attitude, which refrained from avenging their ancestors, while another of his grandsons, Aghriras, praised Zadashm's restraint as an example to emulate.

Preceded by Tur	List of Turanian monarchs	Succeeded by Pashang
