= Hamavaran =

Place in Ferdowsi's Shahnameh

- Former country

Government
  - King: Salar Hamavaran

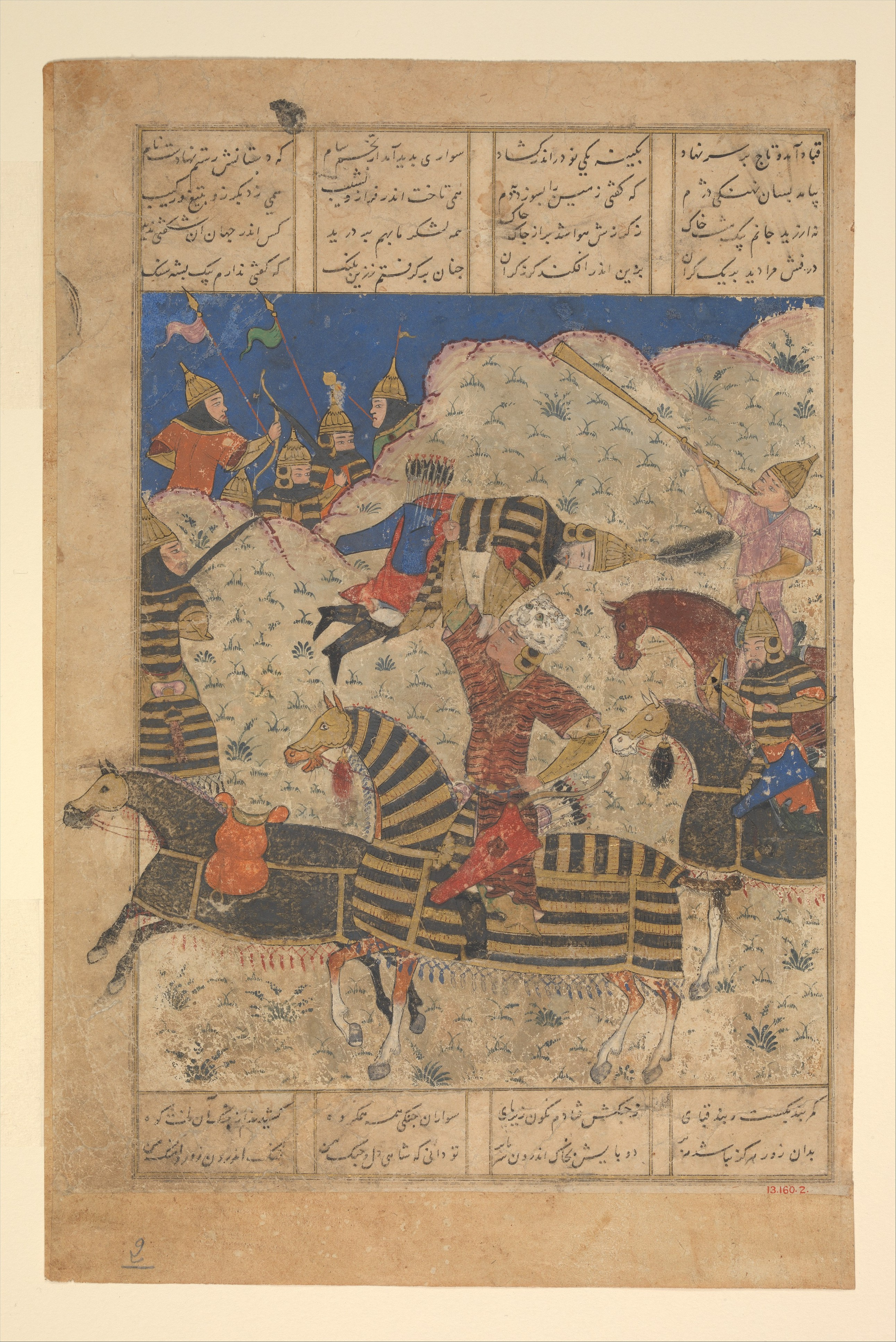
Rustam Overpowers the King of Hamavaran

Hāmāvarān (Persian: هاماوَران) is a place in Shahnameh and other Iranian writings. The consensus between scholars is that Hamavaran is usually identified with Yemen. According to Abdolhossein Zarrinkoob, it is an altered form of Himyarite Kingdom.

== Hamavaran background ==
In some old writings, the name was mentioned as Sambarān, Shambarān, Shammarān, Samarān, and Shamarān. It has been suggested that these forms consists of "Shammar + ān". Shammar in the name of a Himyarite king in 3rd century, and so, Shammarān means "the land of Shammar". In Middle Persian texts, Yemen is mentioned as Yamar, Yambar and Yamyar and that could be a possible form of Hāmāvarān. There are many stories about Hamavaran in Persian literature. In Shahnameh, Kay Kavus fell in love with the daughter of Hamavaran's king, Sudabe. In Shahnameh, Hamavaran is located far away from Iran, and Kay Kavus goes to Hāmāvarān through sea. Hāmāvarān is bordered to the left by Egypt, and to the right by Barbarestan (possibly Sudan). In Sasanian era, Hamavaran was occupied by Abyssinian troops and the king of Hamavaran, asks Khosrow I to help him. Khosrow uses 800 prisoners that are sentenced to death in a war between Abyssinian and Persians, in which Abyssinians were defeated and Hamavaran became a province of Sasanian Empire.

== Sources ==
- Ferdowsi Shahnameh. From the Moscow version. Mohammed Publishing. ISBN 964-5566-35-5
