= Qaren =

Character in Persian epic poem Shahname

Shahnameh Men
- Name: Qaren
- Nicknames: QarenKavegan, QarenRazmzan
- Post: King Ray

Other Information
- Take part in the war: Iran-Turan war

Qaren (Persian: قارن) is present in the Shahnameh during the period of Fereydoun. He is alongside gladiators, such as Nariman, Shapur, Nastooh, Shidoosh and Shirvy. All of these fighters are involved in the battle of Manuchehr because of Kane Iraj.

== Governance Qaren ==
Qaren was the ruler of Ray during the time of Nowzar. One of the highlights of that period is the Iran-Turan war. Shapur, Nastooh, Talaman and Qaren were allies of Nowzar in this war. But because of the defeat that came from the Shapur faction, the capital of Nowzar was besieged.

The primary ally of Nowzar and the commander of the Iranian army was Qaren. According to the Shahnameh, the Iran-Turan war lasted three days On the first day of the war the two armies line up. The commander of Turan Afrasiab division dispatched Barman to identify the place. Barman chasing Qaren and seeks a fighter. The Turanian Barman wanted a Qaren fighter, but no one volunteered to fight him except Qobád the old man.

The war was in the interest of the Turanians, and on the last night of the war, Qaren came near Nuwzer and wanted to go to Pars and save the royal family from captivity. Nowzar did not allow, saying: Sardari is not like you to lead the war tomorrow, but the fighting Qaren went to Pars with his army. On his return from Pars Qaren, he encountered Viseh and a fierce battle with the forces of Viseh led the Turkan to flee.

== See also ==
- Qarenvand dynasty

== Sources ==
- Ferdowsi Shahnameh. From the Russian version. Mohammed Publishing. ISBN 964-5566-35-5
