= Shideh (Shahnameh) =

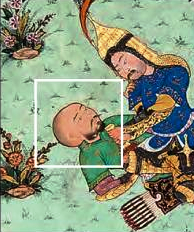
- Battle of the Kay Khosrow with the Shideh in the Great Kay Khosrow War

Shahnameh Men
- Name: Shideh
- Nickname: Pashang; Turanian gladiator
- Post: Prince Turan

Other Information
- Well known: Duel with Kay Khosrow
- Wras: Great Kay Khosrow War
- killes: Kay Khosrow

Family members
- Father Name: Afrasiab
- Sister Name: Farangis
- Uncle: Kay Khosrow
- Nationality: Turkan

Shideh (Persian: شیده) is the son of the Afrasiab King Turan in Shahnameh. He was the last time to appear in the Great War and was the first to enter the battlefield with the Iranians and the Kay khosrow and was destroyed by the Kay khosrow. Kay Khosrow was Shideh's maternal uncle.

== Shideh in Shahnameh ==
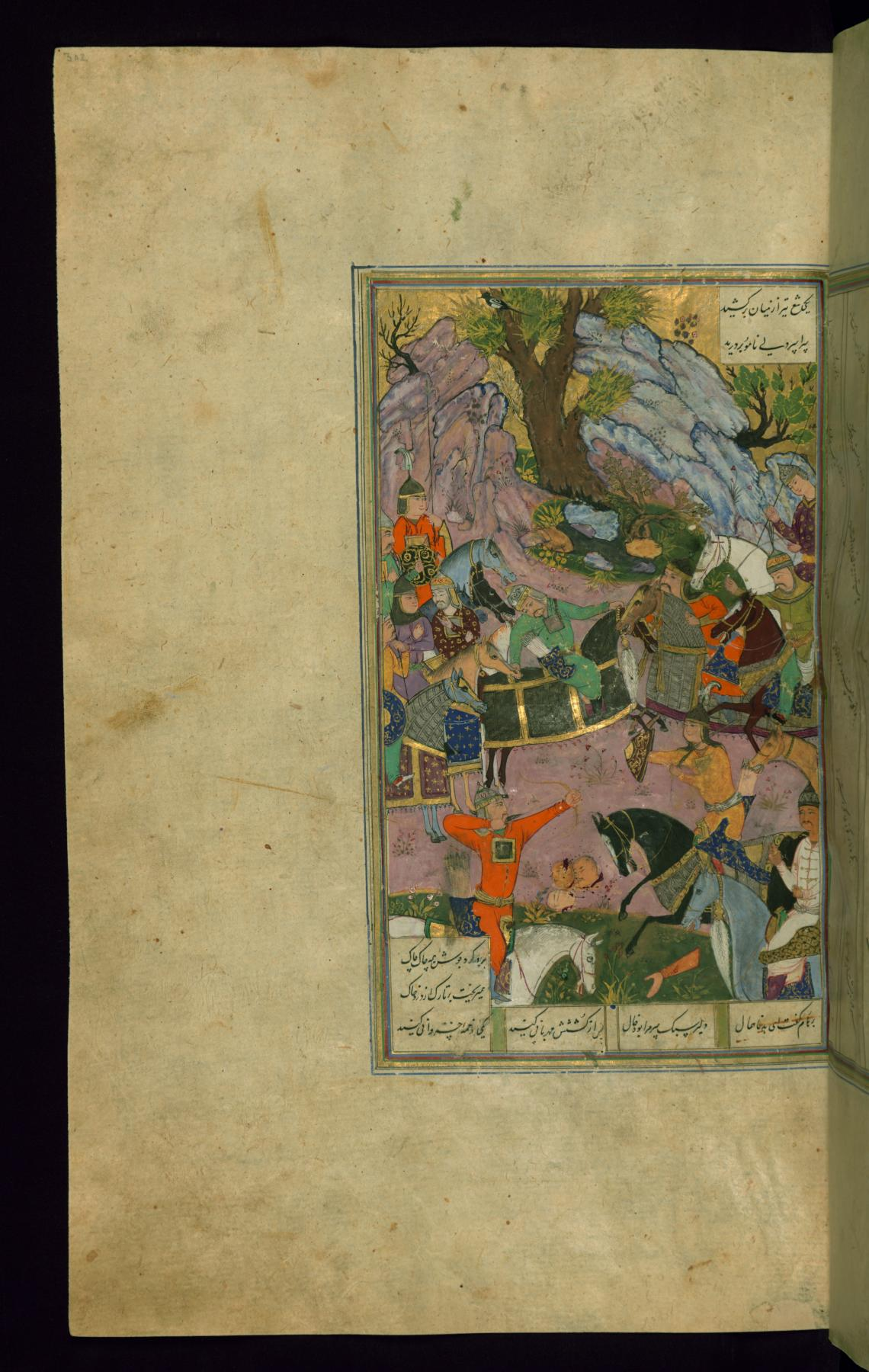
The Great Kay Khosrow War

Afrasiab was concerned that he would fail in the coming war. Afrasiab wanted to know the outcome of the coming war, so sent a spy to search. He then warned Shideh that this huge army that came to our war was their commander, Rustam. Kay Khosrow was the commander-in-chief who wanted to take revenge on Siyâvash blood

When the army was stationed on both sides of the battlefield, the war was postponed because the opponent wanted to launch the first enemy attack. Since the two sides did not act, Shideh was bored and came to her father to protest why the war would not begin. Afrasiab stated his reason, but Shideh disagreed and went to the battlefield and demanded that Kay Khosrow fight him. In the duel, Shideh is killed.

== Sources ==
- Ferdowsi Shahnameh. From the Moscow version. Mohammed Publishing. ISBN 964-5566-35-5
