= Garsivaz =

Mythical Turanian character

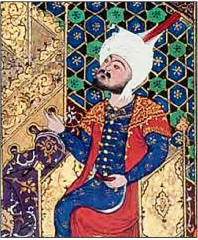
Painting of Garsivaz in the Shahnama of Shah Tahmasp

Garsivaz (also Garsiwaz, Gersiwaz or Karsivaz) (Persian: گَرسیوَز [ɡæɾsiːvæz]) is a mythical Turanian character, referred to in Shahnameh ('Book of Kings') by the Persian epic-poet Ferdowsi. He is the brother of Afrasiab, king of Turan. He convinced his brother to kill Syavash, which in turn resulted in a number of battles between the Iranian and Afrasiab forces.

== Later version of the Garsivaz story ==
One episode mentioned in later manuscript traditions describes Garsivaz being captured after the death of Siyâvash and revealing the location of Afrasiab, who is then killed by Kay Khusrow in retaliation. This version differs from the main narrative of the Shahnameh but appears in several illustrated manuscripts from the Timurid period, where Garsivaz is shown as a figure whose actions ultimately contribute to the downfall of Afrasiab. These accounts reflect later developments in the reception of the epic, in which Garsivaz is portrayed less as a court advisor and more as a catalyst for the final defeat of Turan.
