= Siyâvash =

Major figure in the Shahnameh

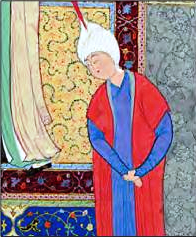
Depiction of the hero Siyâvash: Persian miniature from the illuminated Shahnameh of Shah Tahmasp

Siyâvash (Persian: سیاوش), (Note: Middle Persian Siyâwaxš, from Avestan Syâvaršan) also spelled Siyâvoš or Siavash (سياووش), is a major figure in the Shahnameh. He is introduced by Ferdowsi as the son of Kay Kāvus, who reigns as Shah in the earliest days of Greater Iran for over a century. His name means "the one with black stallions" after his horse Shabrang Behzād (شبرنگ بهزاد, lit. 'night-coloured purebred'), who accompanies him during a trial of righteousness.

Owing to his birth to a non-aristocratic mother, Siyâvash is sent away by his father to Zabulistan, where he is raised by the holy warrior Rostam to be well-versed in the arts of war. He returns as a highly skilled and handsome young man, and is granted entry to the royal court as a prince and the new ruler of Ctesiphon. Shortly thereafter, he meets his stepmother Sudabeh, who develops a burning lust for him and begins devising stratagems to lure him into intercourse. However, Siyâvash repeatedly rejects her advances and also strikes down her suggestion to kill his father so that they can rule together. Fearing that he might inform the Shah and have her executed, Sudabeh falsely accuses Siyâvash of raping her. Hearing his plea, the Shah forces him to prove himself by riding through a colossal mountain of fire. Siyâvash overcomes this trial and is ruled innocent, but his relationship with his father still grows cold; Kāvus decides against punishing Sudabeh due to his love for her, nor does he want to risk angering her father, who is the ruler of Hamavaran and thus a powerful Eastern ally of the Iranian nation. Finding no alternative, Siyâvash goes into self-imposed exile in Turan and seeks asylum under the rule of the region's tyrannical king Afrasiab, who has fostered hostilities with Kāvus for many years. There, he marries the princess Farangis, but is later killed by the Turanians, who declare war on Iran. A distressed Rostam blames Sudabeh for Siyâvash's death, drags her out of her palace, and executes her in public. Meanwhile, Siyâvash's wife manages to escape to Iran, where her son Kay Khosrow becomes the next Shah. Khosrow leads the Iranian campaign against the Turanian army and takes revenge on Afrasiab for his father's death.

In Iranian literature, Siyâvash is widely regarded as a symbol of innocence. His defence of his own chastity, self-imposed exile, constancy in love for his wife, and ultimate execution at the hands of his adopted hosts have become intertwined with Iranian mythology over the millennia. His name is also linked with the mythical growth of plants.

== Narrative ==
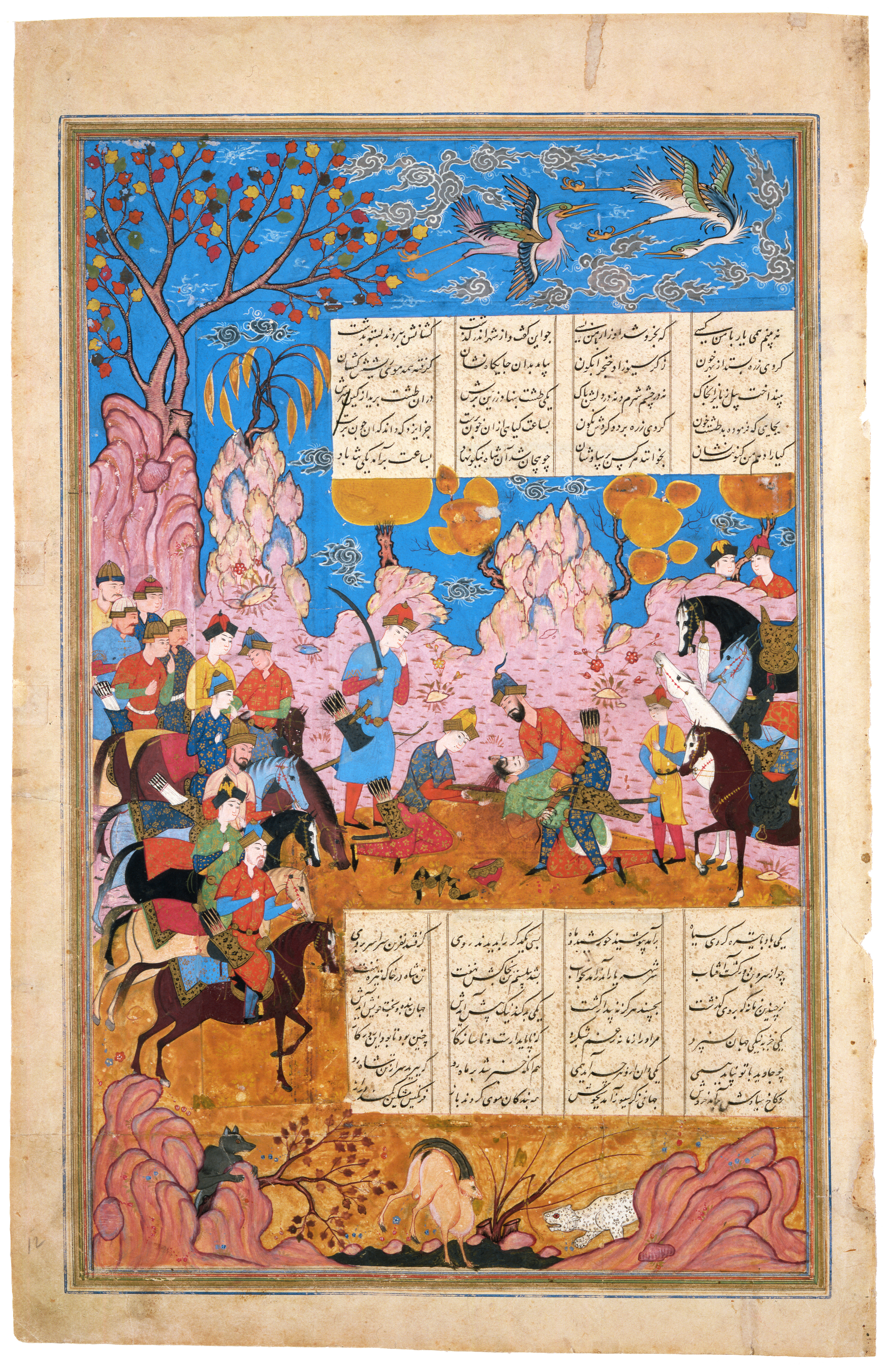
The Slaying of Siyâvash

=== Birth and early life ===
Iranian knights discover a beautiful young woman while on a hunting trip, a favourite pastime of the army hierarchy. They cannot decide on who should possess her for his own pleasure, and a major dispute erupts between them. Finally, they decide to take her to the Shah, Kay Kāvus, for his judgement, but the Shah decides to keep her as his own concubine and Siyâvash is the result of their union. However, as Siyâvash's mother is not an aristocrat, the Shah decides to send him to Rostam, the ultimate hero of Iranian mythology, for training in the military arts.

Rostam instructs the young Siyâvash in the arts of riding, archery, hunting, conduct and speaking the truth, these being the fundamentals in the Acheamenian system of education - as reflected in the Shahnameh on several occasions. After several years of instruction, Siavash asks Rostam's permission to return to Kay Kāvus's Court, so that he may prove his worth as a young prince.

=== Royal appointment ===
At first, Siavash is well received at Court. The ladies swoon over his youthful good looks, while the men are impressed by his mastery of the arts. The Shah even appoints him Ruler of Ctesiphon, the ancient capital of the Parthians (now situated near Baghdad). The Queen, Sudabeh, develops an instantaneous, and all-consuming sexual desire for the young prince, and starts a series of plans to entice him to enter her chambers. She praises Siavash in front of the Court, and invites him to "visit his sisters," and become better acquainted with them. Siavash is not impressed with this proposal and suspects an ulterior motive. The Shah, well-aware of his own queen's connections (she is the daughter of the Shah of Hamavaran) insists that Siavash listen to his "mother" and visit his sisters. In her chambers, the Queen organises a magnificent reception for Siavash . He is seated on a throne, expensive perfumes are lavished upon the chamber, and the ladies sing and dance for his pleasure.

The Shah decides that Siavash should marry one of the ladies, and orders him to choose one immediately, but Siavash refuses to do so, sensing his father's plans for a political union under the guise of marriage. The Queen can no longer control her desire for Siavash. She proposes to have her husband, the Shah of Iran, murdered so that she and Siavash can rule together, but he absolutely refuses to have anything to do with her. Queen Sudabeh realises that Siavash might reveal her plans to her husband, resulting in her certain death.

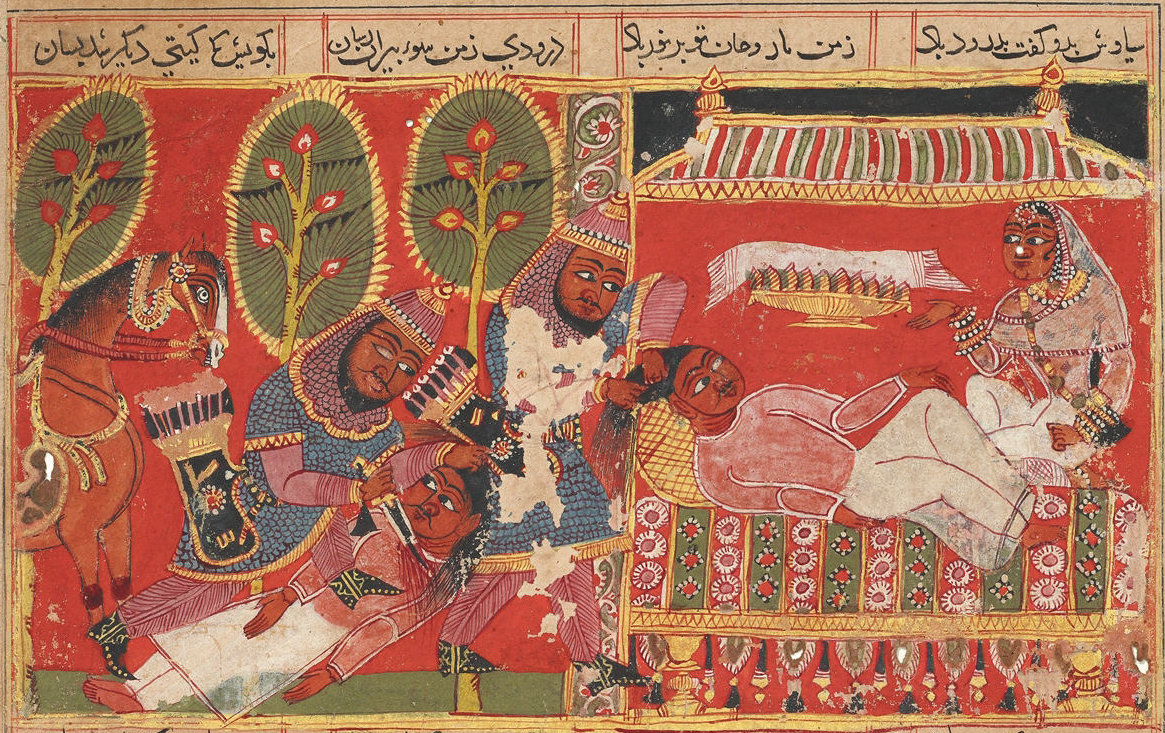
Siyavash is Pulled from His Bed and Killed

She orders one of the witches in her service to find 2 aborted foetuses and place them in a dish. She then runs to the Shah, ripping her robes, screaming, wailing, and crying. The Shah is deeply disturbed by the sight of his wife, bloodied and in tatters. The Queen accuses Siavash of raping her. She provides the aborted foetuses as evidence of his violence towards a "pregnant" Queen.

The Shah is devastated by the news, but listens to Siavash's plea of innocence. He first smells Siavash's robes and finds no sign of seduction or perfume upon them. Then he smells the robes of the Queen and finds them laced with the most exquisite of perfumes: a sure sign of seduction. Nevertheless, he imprisons Siavash, and orders that hundreds of beasts of burden be used to bring fire wood. A gigantic mountain of fire is set alight in front of the Palace, and Siavash is ordered to ride through the blaze. If he is innocent, he will emerge unscathed, but if guilty, he will surely perish. Siavash, armed as a cataphract, covered in (sacred, but highly inflammable) camphor and wearing a white cape, the symbol of innocence, mounts his faithful black steed and charges straight into the vast pyre. The Court holds its breath, as he disappears among the flames, but shortly afterward, the white knight and his valiant black war horse emerge from the fire unscathed and victorious.

Kay Kavus, the Shah, orders the immediate execution of the Queen for bringing shame on his name and kingdom. Wise and sober as ever, Siavash begs for clemency. He knows that the Shah loves his wife and will soon regret her passing. Not long after, the fickle Shah might even accuse Siavash of orchestrating the whole fiasco. The Shah is reminded of the Queen's royal connections, and the importance of his treaty with the Shah of Hamavaran. He relents, forgives his wife, and peace is temporarily restored to life at court.

==== War between Iran and Turan ====
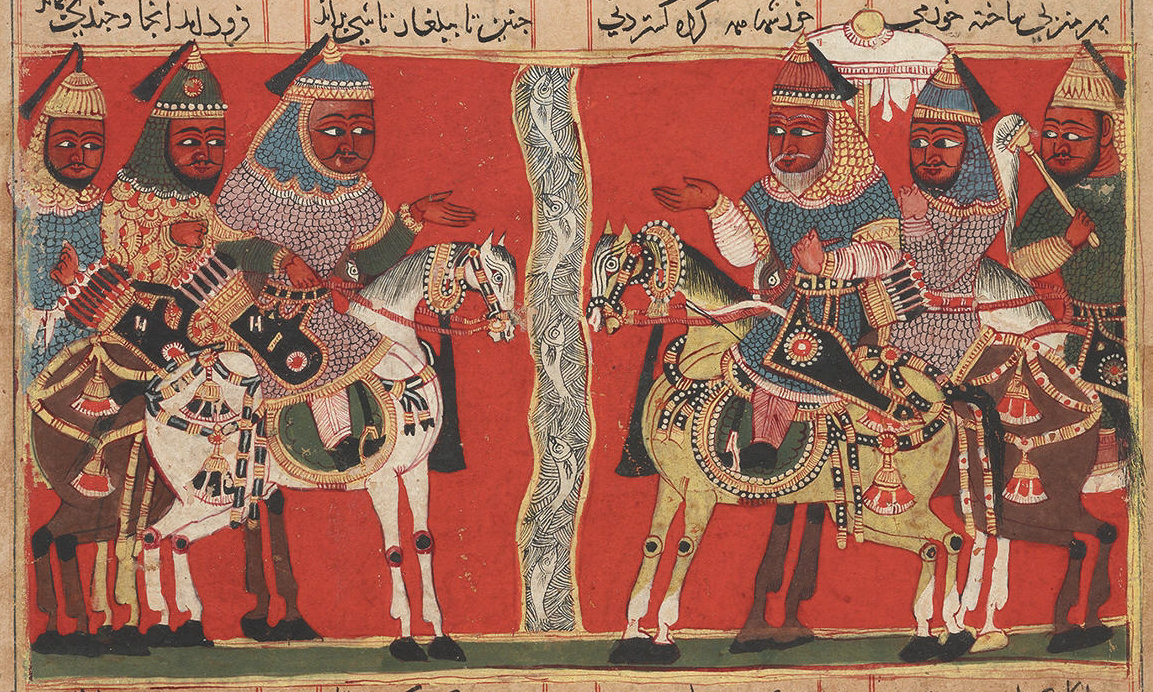
Siyavash faces Afrasiyab across the Jihun River, from Master of the Jainesque Shahnama, 15th century, Sultanate India.

The second part of the Epic of Siavash is dedicated to his separation from his homeland, his unjust treatment at the hands of his own father, Kay Kavus, and his ultimate execution.

Afrasiab, the tyrannical ruler of Turan, a mythical land north of Iran, declares war on the Iranians again. Kay Kavus decides to make an example of Afrasiab's allies in the City of Balkh, and plans to invade it, but is dissuaded from personally attending the battle field by Rostam, the ultimate hero of the Shahnameh. Siavash volunteers for duty, and is immediately sent towards Balkh, and certain war.

On the Turanian side, Garsivaz, the ruler of the Bulgars joins forces with the Tatars under the command of Barman. The intense battle results in a crushing defeat for the Turanians who are captured by Siyâvash. Disturbed by ill-omens in his sleep, Afrasiab dreams of his own defeat, and upon hearing the news from Balkh, sends horses, armour, and swords, suing for peace. Garsivaz represents Afrasiab at the peace talks. Siavash agrees to keep one hundred hostages and the return of lands taken from Iran by the Turanians in return for peace. The cities of Samarkand, Bukhara, Haj, and the Punjab are returned to Iranian rule while the hostages are taken into custody by Siavash.

The Iranian Shah is disgusted with Siavash's behaviour, because he had hoped that Afrasiab would be killed in battle. He writes a letter to Siavash at the height of his fury, and orders him to return home, while assigning Toos as the new commander of the Iranian forces. He also demands the transfer of the hostages for execution. The letter goes against everything Siavash had been taught to do by Rostam. Breaking a peace treaty, declaring war, and murdering hostages all sicken him. Siavash knows that he is incapable of these tyrannical acts requested by the Shah, and sees no option but to abandon his homeland and seek refuge in Turan.

=== Self-exile and death in Turan ===
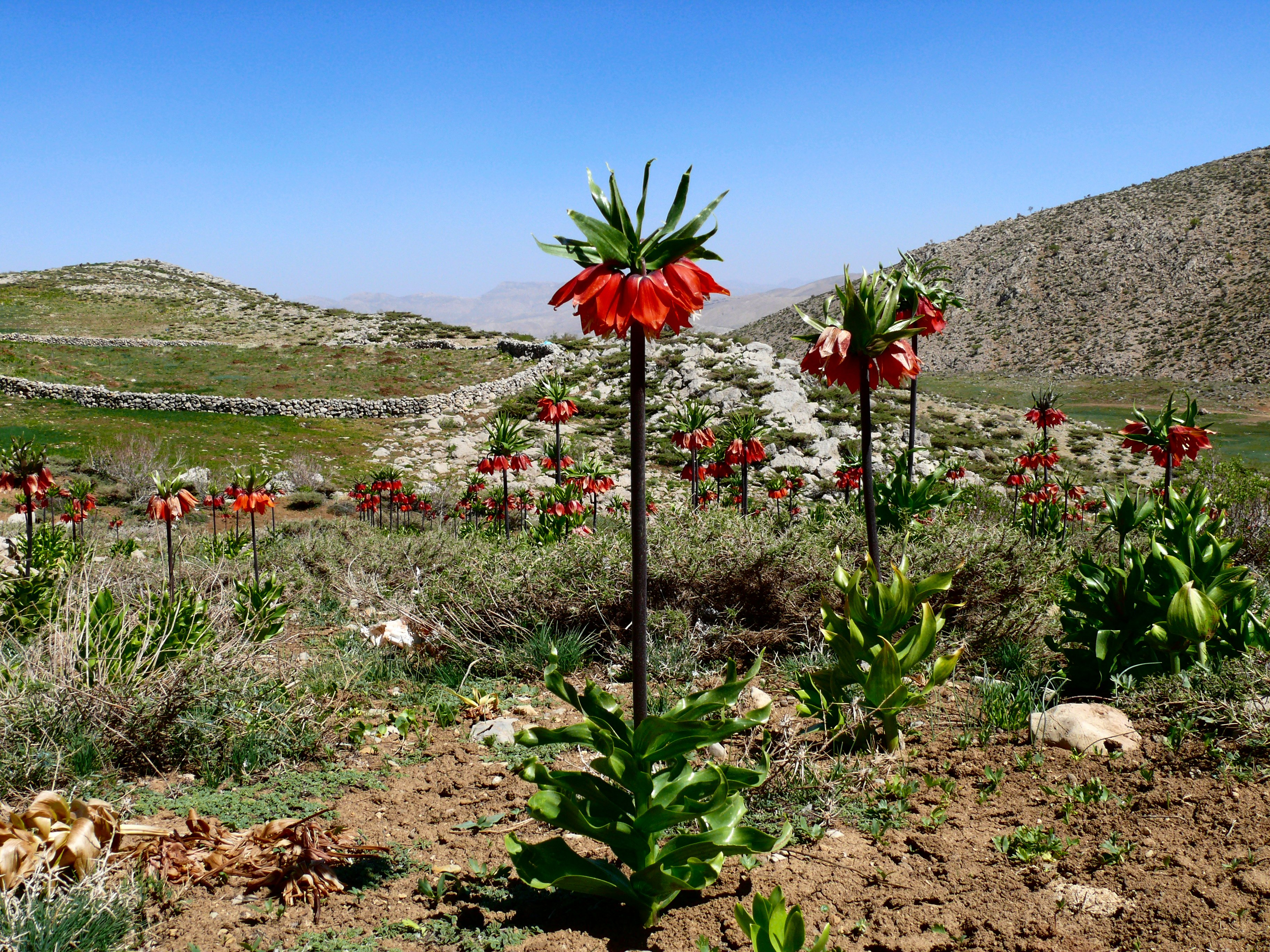
The blood-red flowers of Fritillaria imperialis are said, in Iranian folklore, to bow their heads and weep for the blameless and martyred Siyâvash and this may be the identity of the plant Khune Asyavushan ('the blood of Siyâvash')

Despite exile, Siavash is determined to find a new life for himself in the land of Turan. Afrasiab, the Turanian Emperor receives him warmly, and Peeran, the Grand Vizier, provides him with solace in his first few days in a foreign land. Eventually, Siavash falls in love with and marries Ferigees ("Curly Locks"), the Emperor's daughter, thereby sealing his new attachment to life at the Turanian Court. Delighted with the marriage, Afrasiab bestows the county of Khotan (now in Xinjiang, China) onto the bride and groom. Siavash sets about creating a new city, called Siavashgird, or "the round city of Siavash", and Gong ("Giant") Castle. However, Siavash's sudden rise to favour at the Turanian court causes much jealousy amongst certain of the knights and dignitaries, who wonder why the Emperor's daughter had been given to the prince of Iran, a foreigner and their sworn enemy. Garsivaz, foremost among the disgruntled few, sends secret messages to Afrasiab, proclaiming Siavash "a traitor," in view of his "letters" that had been sent to his father in Iran, Shah Kay Kavus. He also convinces Siyâvash that Afrasiab is plotting against him and will soon invade Khotan to reclaim the land bestowed upon him.

Soon, the impetuous and egotistical Turanian Emperor mobilises against Siavash, and defeats his small army. However, Siavash manages to help his wife, Ferigees to escape with Peeran, who ensures that Ferigees reaches Iran, where her son, Kay Khosrow will grow to become a wise Shah who eventually restores order.

Siavash is dragged before Afrasiab, who orders his execution by beheading. Peeran implores the Emperor not to commit the horrendous mistake of killing the innocent: "Do not make thyself a flag upon this Earth." The hot-headed Afrasiab ignores the warning and the execution is carried out swiftly. As Siyâvash's blood reaches the ground, a plant grows upon the same spot and is later named "Khune Asyavushan," or the "blood of Siavash." This line in the epic ties the story to the early links between the name "Siavash," and his role as the spirit of vegetative growth.

== Legacy ==
The news of his execution causes uproar in Iran, and, to this day, is still commemorated in Shiraz as the day of Savušun. His tragic death, as recounted in the Shahnameh has inspired hundreds of poems, essays, songs and stories in Iranian literature, among them Simin Dânešvar's groundbreaking novel Savušun, which has the distinction of being the first novel to be written in Persian by a female author.

=== In Central Asian Zoroastrianism ===
Before the Islamization of Central Asia, the inhabitants of both Khwarazm and Sogdia performed sacrifices and other rituals dedicated to Siyâvaš. According to the historian Tolstov, "Siyavash was also venerated as the Central Asian god of dying and reviving vegetation."

== See also ==
- Siyavakhsh
- Siyavuş Pasha, the name and title of various Ottoman dignitaries
- Siyâvush Beg Gorji, famous Iranian illustrator of miniatures
- Joseph (Genesis) / Yusuf (Qur'an) virtuous hero slandered by temptress
- Potiphar's wife / Zuleikha: biblical and Qur'anic figure comparable to the temptress Sudabeh
- Hippolytus of Athens, king's son in Greek myth who rejects his stepmother's advances
- Björn (the father of Bödvar Bjarki), king's son in Norse myth who rejects his stepmother's advances
- Hyacinth (mythology), handsome Greek hero, from whose blood, as in the case of Siyavash, a plant grows
- Adonis, also a Greek hero transformed, at his death, into a plant
- Dumuzid, Sumerian deity associated with vegetation
- The Black Colt (Iranian folktale)
- The Wonderful Sea-Horse (Iranian folktale)

== Sources and references ==
- Ferdowsi, Abolqasem; Davis, Dick (2005). "The Legend of Seyavash". New England Review. 26 (4): 21–69. JSTOR 40244746.
- Abolqasem Ferdowsi, Dick Davis trans. (2006), Shahnameh: The Persian Book of Kings ISBN 0-670-03485-1, modern English translation (abridged), current standard
- Warner, Arthur and Edmond Warner, (translators) The Shahnama of Firdausi, 9 vols. (London: Keegan Paul, 1905-1925) (complete English verse translation)
- Shirzad Aghaee, Nam-e kasan va ja'i-ha dar Shahnama-ye Ferdousi (Personalities and Places in the Shahnama of Ferdousi), Nyköping, Sweden, 1993. (ISBN 91-630-1959-0)
- Jalal Khāleghi Motlagh, Editor, The Shahnameh, to be published in 8 volumes (ca. 500 pages each), consisting of six volumes of text and two volumes of explanatory notes. See: Center for Iranian Studies, Columbia University.
