= Nowzar =

Legendary ancient Persian monarch

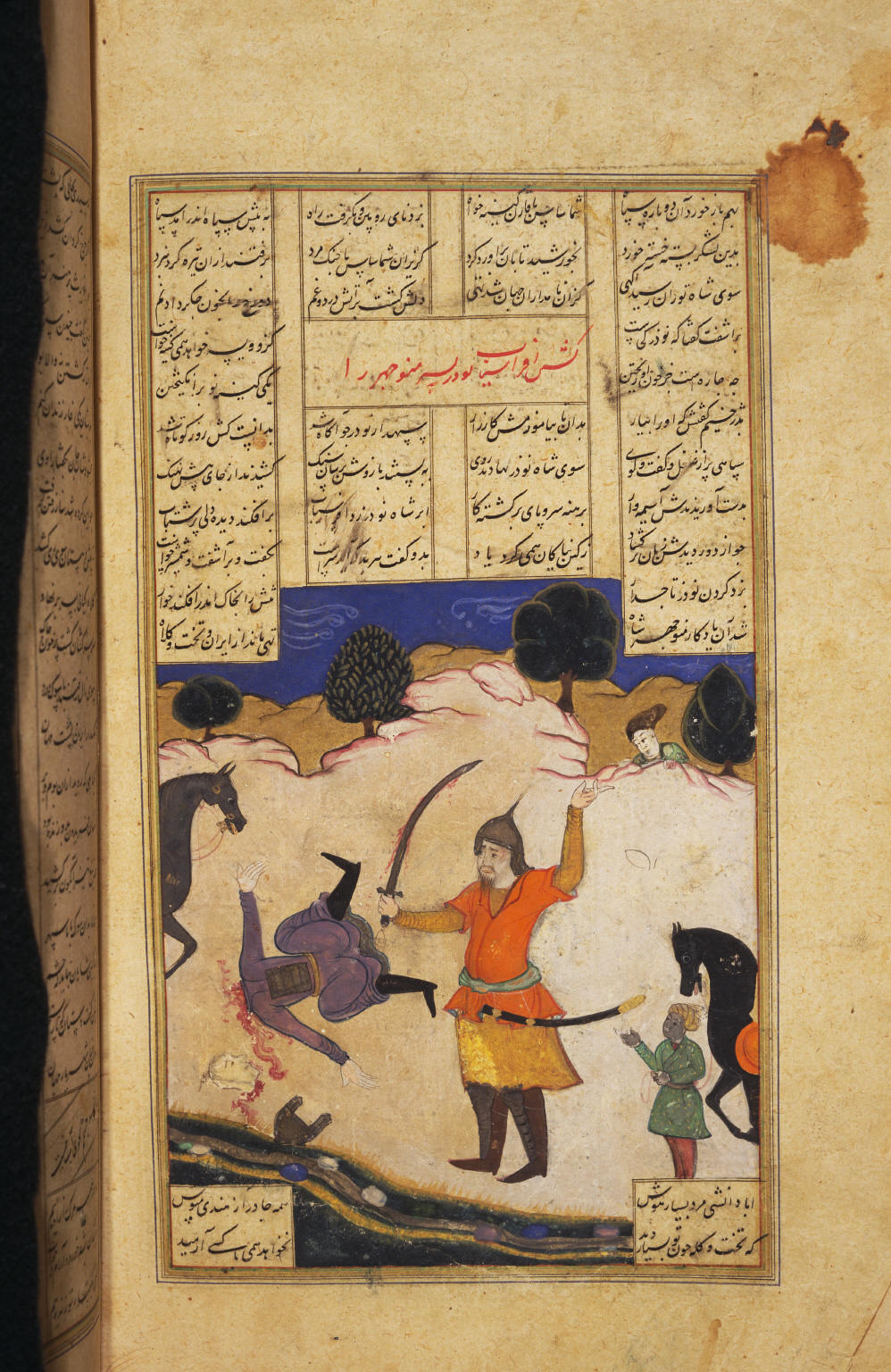
Persian manuscript painting: Afrasiab kills Nowzar son of Manuchehr, during a battle.

Nowzar, Nouzar, Nowzer, Novzar or Nōzar (/ˈnoʊˈzær/; Persian: نُوذَر, Persian pronunciation: [ˈnoːˈzæɾ]) is the ninth Shah of the Pishdadian dynasty of Persia according to Shahnameh. He is the son of Manuchehr and becomes the Shah of Iran after his father's death. His reign of seven years comes to an end when he is killed by Afrasiab during a battle.

He is also mentioned in Avesta as a great warrior and hero. Many future warriors traced back their origin to him and were labeled Nowzarian (Persian: نوذریان).

== In the Shahnameh ==
On his deathbed, Nowzar's father, Manuchehr, told Nowzar to be a humble, righteous king and warned of danger from Turan, where enemies of their ancestors rule. Nowzar took the throne and quickly became a weak and greedy king who overtaxed his subjects. Realizing that his kingdom was on the brink of collapse from uprising within and rival kingdoms without, Nowzar called on the warrior Sām for help. After rejecting a rebellion that offered to make him king, Sām reminded Nowzar of the counsel his father gave him and Nowzar promised to be a righteous and just king from then on.

While Nowzar tried to stabilize Iran, Pashang, the Turanian king, sent his son, Afrasiab, to invade the weakened kingdom of Iran. Nowzar led an army against the invaders, but he was captured and killed by Abrasiab.

== Family Tree ==
Manuchehr
Nowzar
Tous	Gostahm

Preceded by Manuchehr	Legendary Kings of the Shāhnāma; 2420–2427 (after Keyumars)	Succeeded by Zaav

== Sources ==
- Abolqasem Ferdowsi, Dick Davis trans. (2006), Shahnameh: The Persian Book of Kings ISBN 0-670-03485-1, modern English translation (abridged), current standard
- Warner, Arthur and Edmond Warner, (translators) The Shahnama of Firdausi, 9 vols. (London: Keegan Paul, 1905-1925) (complete English verse translation)
- Shirzad Aghaee, Nam-e kasan va ja'i-ha dar Shahnama-ye Ferdousi(Personalities and Places in the Shahnama of Ferdousi, Nyköping, Sweden, 1993. (ISBN 91-630-1959-0)
- Jalal Khāleghi Motlagh, Editor, The Shahnameh, to be published in 8 volumes (ca. 500 pages each), consisting of six volumes of text and two volumes of explanatory notes. See: Center for Iranian Studies, Columbia University.
