= Pashang =

Name of two characters in Persian Mythology

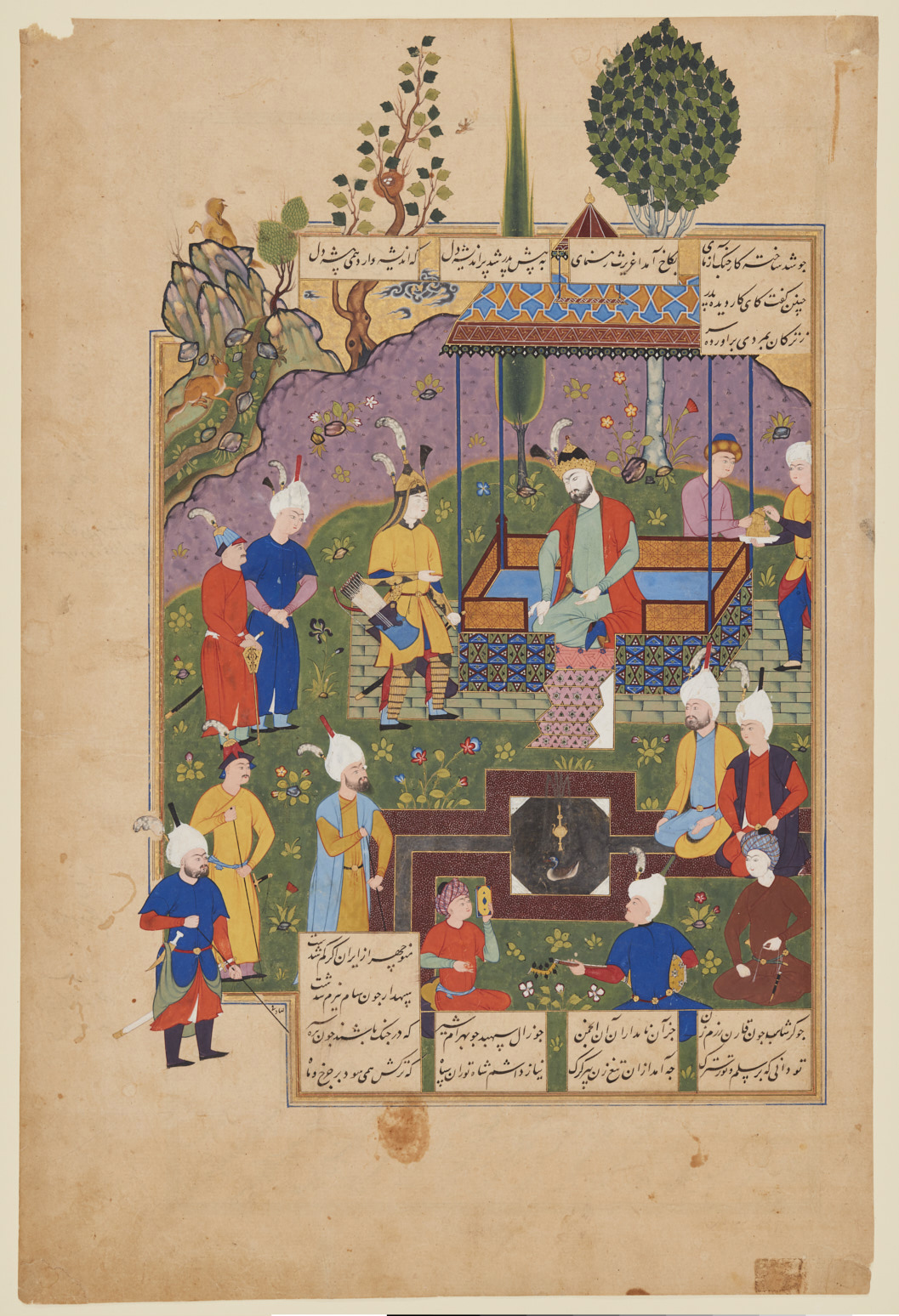
Pashang discusses the invasion of Iran. Miniature by Sadiqi Beg from the Shahnameh of Shah Ismail II. Qazvin, 1576–77. Aga Khan Museum

Pashang (Persian: پَشَنْگ) is the name of two separate characters in Persian mythology. According to Ferdowsi's epic, the Shahnameh, he is of the race of Tur (who is the son of Fereydun) and is the father of Afrasiab. He was an early king of Turan. In Bal'ami's Tarikhnama, he is the son of Gayumars, the first king in the world, and is murdered by demons. In some manuscripts, the name is written Hushang.

== Pashang and the origins of the Iran–Turan conflict ==
In Ferdowsi’s Shahnameh, Pashang is portrayed as an early ruler of Turan, descended from Tur, son of Fereydun. He is best known as the father of Afrasiab, a central antagonist in the Iranian–Turanian wars across the epic. Pashang’s counsel to Afrasiab following the weakness and death of Nowzar provides the narrative impetus for renewed Turanian aggression against Iran, framing a dynastic and moral division that reverberates through later episodes. Though his appearances are brief, Pashang’s role establishes the intergenerational logic of vengeance and rivalry that structures much of Ferdowsi’s narrative.

Preceded by Zadashm	List of Turanian monarchs	Succeeded by Afrasiab
