= Turan =

Historical region in Central Asia

Turan (Avestan: 𐬚𐬏𐬌𐬭𐬌𐬌𐬁𐬥𐬆𐬨, romanized: θūiriiānəm; Middle Persian: Tūrān; Persian: توران, romanized: Turân, pronounced [tʰuːˈɾɒːn], lit. 'The Land of Tur') is a historical region in Central Asia. The term is of Iranian origin and may refer to a particular prehistoric human settlement, a historic geographical region, or a culture. The original Turanians were an Iranian tribe of the Avestan age.

== Overview ==
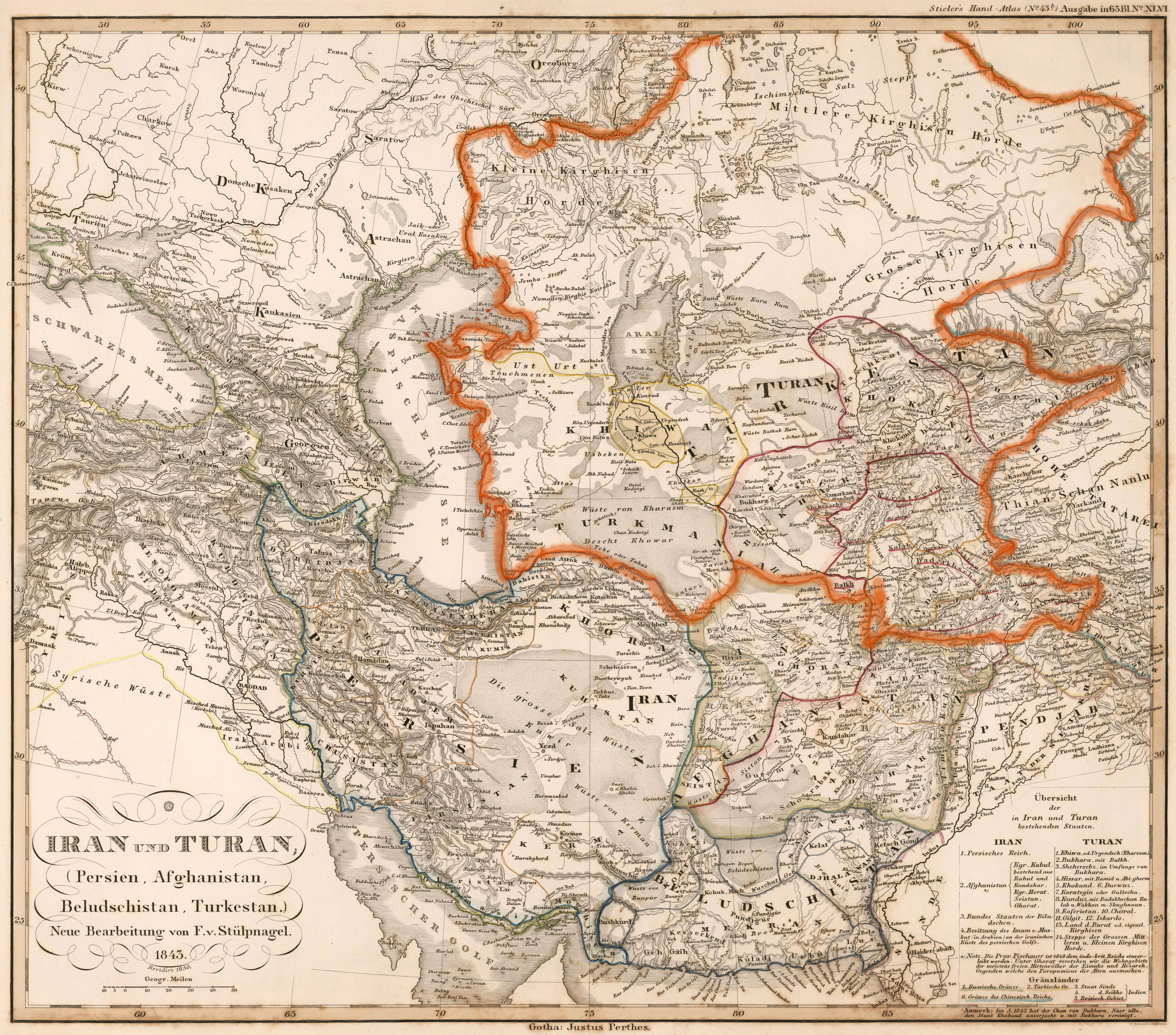
German "Map of Iran and Turan", dated 1843 (during the Qajar dynasty), Turan territory indicated by orange line (here enhanced). According to the legend (bottom right of the map), Turan encompasses regions including modern Uzbekistan, Kyrgyzstan, Tajikistan, Turkmenistan, northern parts of Afghanistan and northern Pakistan. This area roughly corresponds to what is called Central Asia today. List of the areas mentioned in the map as part of Turan: 1. Khwarazm 2. Bukhara with Balkh 3. Shehersebz (near Bukhara) 4. Hissar 5. Kokand 6. Durwaz 7. Karategin 8. Kunduz 9. Kafiristan 10. Chitral 11. Gilgit 12. Iskardu 13. Kyrgyzstan 14. The northern steppes (Kazakhstan).

In ancient Iranian mythology, Tūr or Turaj (Tuzh in Middle Persian) is the son of the emperor Fereydun. According to the account in the Shahnameh, the nomadic tribes who inhabited these lands were ruled by Tūr. In that sense, the Turanians could be members of two Iranian peoples both descending from Fereydun, but with different geographical domains and often at war with each other. Turan, therefore, comprised five areas: the Kopet Dag region, the Atrek valley, parts of Bactria, Sogdia and Margiana.

A later association of the original Turanians with Turkic peoples is based primarily on the subsequent Turkification of Central Asia, including the above areas. According to C. E. Bosworth, however, there was no cultural relationship between the ancient Turkic cultures and the Turanians of the Shahnameh.

== History ==
=== Ancient literature ===
==== Avesta ====
The oldest existing mention of Turan is in the Farvardin yashts, which are in the Young Avestan language and have been dated by linguists to about 2500 years ago. According to Gherardo Gnoli, the Avesta contains the names of various tribes who lived in proximity to each other: "the Airyas [Aryans], Tuiryas [Turanians], Sairimas [Sarmatians], Sainus [Sacae] and Dahis [Dahae]". In the hymns of the Avesta, the adjective Tūrya is attached to various enemies of Zoroastrianism like Fraŋrasyan (Shahnameh: Afrāsīāb). The word occurs only once in the Gathas, but 20 times in the later parts of the Avesta. The Tuiryas, as they were called in Avesta, play a more important role in the Avesta than the Sairimas, Sainus and Dahis. Zoroaster himself hailed from the Airya people but he also preached his message to other neighboring tribes.

According to Mary Boyce, in the Farvardin Yasht, "In it (verses 143–144) are praised the fravashis of righteous men and women not only among the Aryas (as the "Avestan" people called themselves), but also among the Turiyas, Sairimas, Sainus and Dahis; and the personal names, like those of the people, all seem Iranian in character". Hostility between Tuirya and Airya is indicated also in the Farvardtn Yast (vv. 37-8), where the Fravashis of the Just are said to have provided support in battle against the Danus, who appear to be a clan of the Tura people. Thus in the Avesta, some of the Tuiryas believed in the message of Zoroaster while others rejected the religion.

Similar to the ancient homeland of Zoroaster, the precise geography and location of Turan is unknown. In post-Avestan traditions they were thought to inhabit the region north of the Oxus, the river separating them from the Iranians. Their presence, accompanied by incessant wars with the Iranians, helped to define the latter as a distinct nation, proud of their land and ready to spill their blood in its defense. The common names of Turanians in Avesta and Shahnameh include Frarasyan, Aghraethra, Biderafsh, Arjaspa Namkhwast. The names of Iranian tribes including those of the Turanians that appear in Avesta have been studied by Manfred Mayrhofer in his comprehensive book on Avesta personal name etymologies.

==== Sassanian Empire ====
From the 5th century CE, the Sasanian Empire defined "Turan" in opposition to "Iran", as the land where lay its enemies to the northeast.

The continuation of nomadic invasions on the north-eastern borders in historical times kept the memory of the Turanians alive. After the 6th century the Turks, who had been pushed westward by other tribes, became neighbours of Iran and were identified with the Turanians. The identification of the Turanians with the Turks was a late development, possibly made in the early 7th century; the Turks first came into contact with the Iranians only in the 6th century.

=== Middle literature ===
==== Early Islamic era ====
According to Clifford E. Bosworth:

In early Islamic times Persians tended to identify all the lands to the northeast of Khorasan and lying beyond the Oxus with the region of Turan, which in the Shahnama of Ferdowsi is regarded as the land allotted to Fereydun's son Tur. The denizens of Turan were held to include the Turks, in the first four centuries of Islam essentially those nomadizing beyond the Jaxartes, and behind them the Chinese (see Kowalski; Minorsky, "Turan"). Turan thus became both an ethnic and a geographical term, but always containing ambiguities and contradictions, arising from the fact that all through Islamic times the lands immediately beyond the Oxus and along its lower reaches were the homes not of Turks but of Iranian peoples, such as the Sogdians and Khwarezmians.

The terms Turk and Turanian became used interchangeably during the Islamic era. The Shahnameh, or the Book of Kings, the compilation of Iranian mythical heritage, uses the two terms equivalently. Other authors, including Tabari, Hakim Iranshah and many other texts follow like. A notable exception is the Abl-Hasan Ali ibn Masudi, an Arab historian who writes: "The birth of Afrasiyab was in the land of Turks and the error that historians and non-historians have made about him being a Turk is due to this reason". By the 10th century, the myth of Afrasiyab was adopted by the Qarakhanid dynasty. During the Safavid era, following the common geographical convention of the Shahnameh, the term Turan was used to refer to the domain of the Uzbek empire in conflict with the Safavids.

Some linguists derive the word from the Indo-Iranian root *tura- 'strong, quick, sword', Pashto turan (thuran) 'swordsman'. Others link it to old Iranian *tor 'dark, black', related to the New Persian tār(ik), Pashto tor (thor), and possibly English dark. In this case, it is a reference to the "dark civilization" of Central Asian nomads in contrast to the "illuminated" Zoroastrian civilization of the settled Ārya.

==== Shahnameh ====
In the Persian epic Shahnameh, the term Tūrān ('land of the Tūrya' like Ērān, Īrān = 'land of the Ārya') refers to the inhabitants of the eastern-Iranian border and beyond the Oxus. According to the foundation myth given in the Shahnameh, King Firēdūn (= Avestan Θraētaona) had three sons, Salm, Tūr and Iraj, among whom he divided the world: Asia Minor was given to Salm, Turan to Tur and Iran to Īraj. The older brothers killed the younger, but he was avenged by his grandson, and the Iranians became the rulers of the world. However, the war continued for generations. In the Shahnameh, the word Turan appears nearly 150 times and that of Iran nearly 750 times.

Some examples from the Shahnameh:

نه خاکست پیدا نه دریا نه کوه
ز بس تیغداران توران گروه

Translation:

No earth is visible, no sea, no mountain,
From the many blade-wielders of the Turan horde

تهمتن به توران سپه شد به جنگ
بدانسان که نخجیر بیند پلنگ

Translation:

Tahamtan (Powerful-Bodied) Rostam took the fight to the Turan army
Just as a leopard sights its prey.

=== Modern literature ===
==== Geography ====
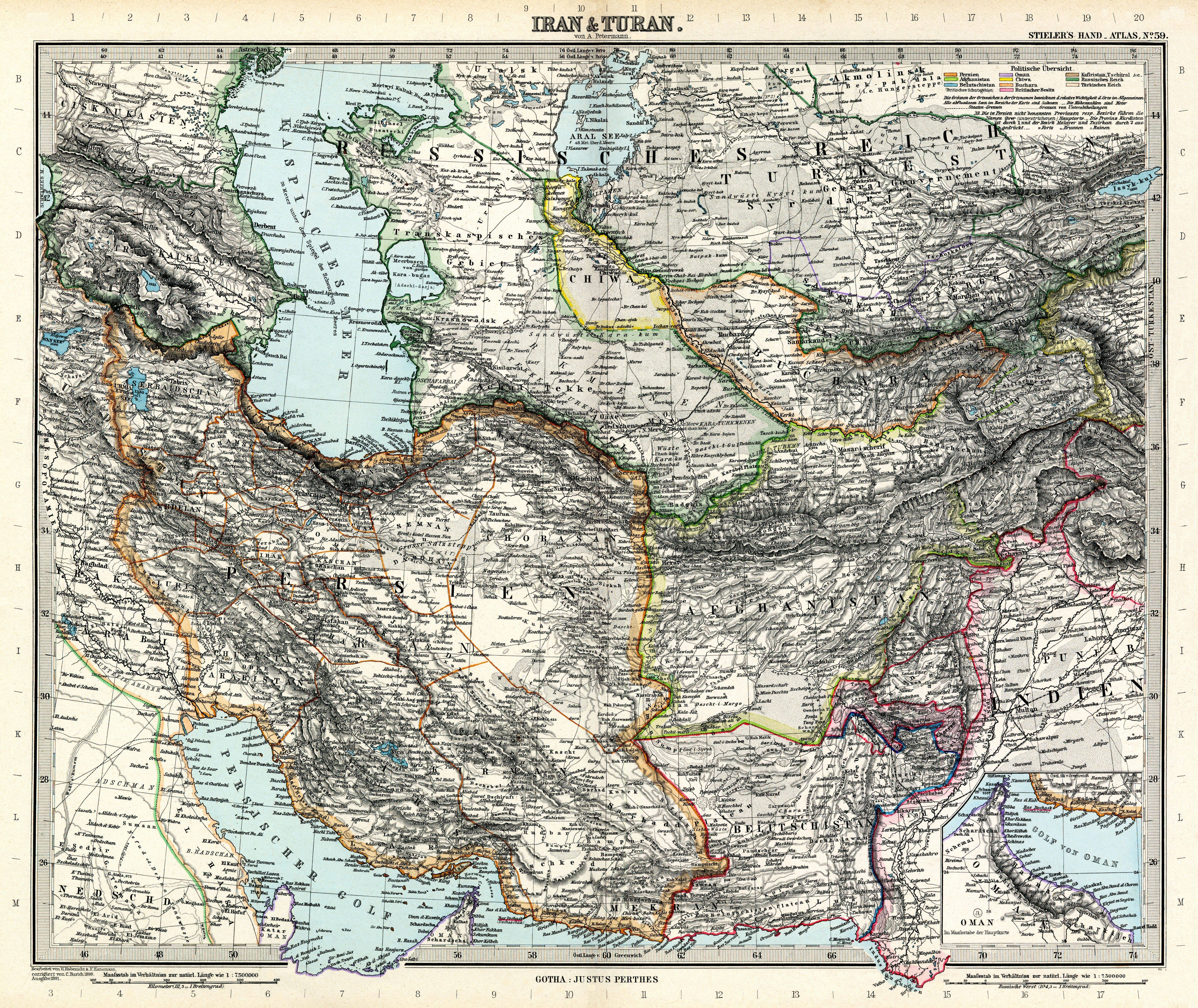
Another 19th-century "Map of Iran and Turan", drawn by Adolf Stieler

In the 19th and early 20th centuries, Western languages borrowed the word Turan as a general designation for modern Central Asia, although this expression has now fallen into disuse. Turan appears next to Iran on numerous maps of the 19th century to designate a region encompassing modern Uzbekistan, Kazakhstan, Kyrgyzstan, Tajikistan, Turkmenistan and northern parts of Afghanistan and Pakistan. This area roughly corresponds to what is called Central Asia today.

The phrase Turan Plain or Turan Depression became a geographical term referring to a part of Central Asia.

==== Linguistics ====
The term Turanian, now obsolete, formerly occurred in the classifications used by European (especially German, Hungarian, and Slovak) ethnologists, linguists, and Romantics to designate populations speaking non-Indo-European, non-Semitic, and non-Hamitic languages and specially speakers of Altaic, Dravidian, Uralic, Japanese, Korean and other languages.

Max Müller (1823–1900) identified different sub-branches within the Turanian language family:

- the Middle Altaic division branch, comprising Tungusic, Mongolic, Turkic.
- The Northern Ural Samoyedic, Ugriche and Finnic.
- the Southern branch consisted of Dravidian languages such as Tamil, Kannada, Telugu, Malayalam, and other Dravidian languages.
- the languages of the Caucasus which Müller classified as the scattered languages of the Turanian family.

Müller also began to muse whether Chinese belonged to the Northern branch or Southern branch.

The main relationships between Dravidian, Uralic, and Altaic languages were considered typological. According to Crystal & Robins, "Language families, as conceived in the historical study of languages, should not be confused with the quite separate classifications of languages by reference to their sharing certain predominant features of grammatical structure." As of 2013 linguists classify languages according to the method of comparative linguistics rather than using their typological features. According to Encyclopædia Britannica, Max's Müller's "efforts were most successful in the case of the Semites, whose affinities are easy to demonstrate, and probably least successful in the case of the Turanian peoples, whose early origins are hypothetical". As of 2014 the scholarly community no longer uses the word Turanian to denote a classification of language families. The relationship between Uralic and Altaic, whose speakers were also designated as Turanian people in 19th-century European literature, remains uncertain.

==== Ideology ====
In European discourse, the words Turan and Turanian can designate a certain mentality, i.e. the nomadic in contrast to the urbanized agricultural civilizations. This usage probably matches the Zoroastrian concept of the Tūrya, which is not primarily a linguistic or ethnic designation, but rather a name of the infidels who opposed the civilization based on the preaching of Zoroaster.

Combined with physical anthropology, the concept of the Turanian mentality has a clear potential for cultural polemic. Thus in 1838 the scholar J.W. Jackson described the Turanid or Turanian race in the following words:

The Turanian is the impersonation of material power. He is the merely muscular man at his maximum of collective development. He is not inherently a savage, but he is radically a barbarian. He does not live from hand to mouth, like a beast, but neither has he in full measure the moral and intellectual endowments of the true man. He can labour and he can accumulate, but he cannot think and aspire like a Caucasian. Of the two grand elements of superior human life, he is more deficient in the sentiments than in the faculties. And of the latter, he is better provided with those that conduce to the acquisition of knowledge than the origination of ideas.

Polish philosopher Feliks Koneczny claimed the existence of a distinctive Turanian civilization, encompassing both Turkic and some Slavs, such as Russians. This alleged civilization's hallmark would be militarism, anti-intellectualism and an absolute obedience to the ruler. Koneczny saw this civilization as inherently inferior to Latin (Western European) civilization.

==== Politics ====
In the declining days of the Ottoman Empire, some Turkish nationalists adopted the word Turanian to express a pan-Turkic ideology, also called Turanism. As of 2013 Turanism forms an important aspect of the ideology of the Turkish Nationalist Movement Party (MHP), whose members are also known as Grey Wolves.

In recent times, the word Turanian has sometimes expressed a pan-Altaic nationalism (theoretically including Manchus and Mongols in addition to Turks), though no political organization seems to have adopted such an ambitious platform.

==== Names ====
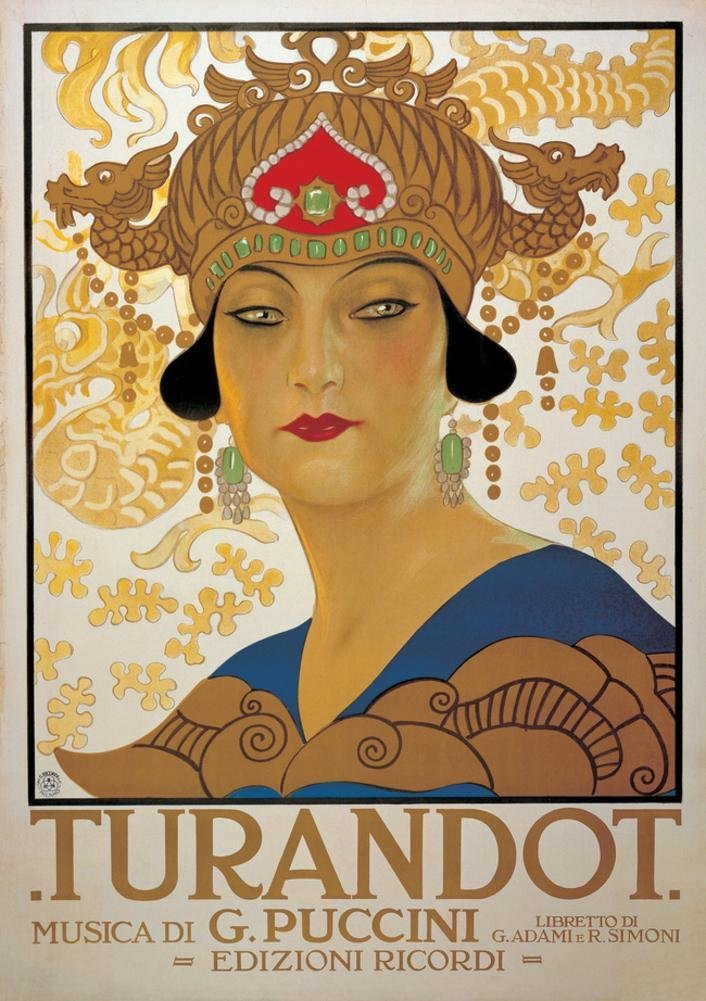
Poster of the opera by Giacomo Puccini, Turandot (1926)

Turandot – or Turandokht – is a female name in Iran and it means "Turan's Daughter" in Persian (it is best known in the West through Puccini's famous opera Turandot (1921–24)).

Turan is also a common name in the Middle East, and as family surnames in some countries including Bahrain, Iran and Turkey.

The Ayyubid ruler Saladin had an older brother with the name Turan-Shah.

Turaj, whom ancient Iranian myths depict as the ancestor of the Turanians, is also a popular name and means Son of Darkness. The name Turan according to Iranian myths derives from the homeland of Turaj. The Pahlavi pronunciation of Turaj is Tuzh, according to the Dehkhoda dictionary. Similarly, Iraj, which is also a popular name, is the brother of Turaj in the Shahnameh. An altered version of Turaj is Zaraj, which means son of gold.

== See also ==
- Scythia
- Ariana
- Bactria
- Dahistan
- Khorasan
- Khwarazm
- Margiana
- Parthia
- Sogdia
- Tokharistan
- Transoxiana
- Turkestan
