= Afrasiab =

Mythical king and hero of Turan

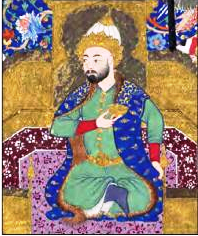
Painting of Afrasiab in the Shahnameh of Shah Tahmasp.

Afrasiab (Persian: افراسياب afrāsiyāb, Middle Persian: Frāsiyāv, Frāsiyāk, Avestan: Fraŋrasyan) is the king of Turan and the main antagonist of the Persian epic Shahnameh by Ferdowsi.

== Name and origin ==
The oldest attested form of the name is the Avestan Fraŋrasyan, which Émile Benveniste derived from *fra-hrasya- 'to make disappear, to fell, to destroy'. This etymology is connected with a myth in which Afrasiab holds back rain. The Persian form of the name is derived from a version of the name which ends in āb 'water' (*Frahrasyāpa- > *Frārasyāp > Frāsīāb).

== In the Avesta ==
The oldest mention of Afrasiab is found in the Avesta, where he is called Fraŋrasyan. Although the Avesta does not present his story in a single coherent narrative, it is alluded to numerous times in the so called Legendary Yashts. In these hymns, he is already presented as the King of the Turanians and archenemy of the Iranians. His common epithet mairya- (deceitful, villainous) can be interpreted as meaning an evil man. He lived in a subterranean fortress made of metal, called Hanakana.

According to the Aban Yasht, he sacrificed to Anahita to obtain the royal glory of the Kayanians. According to the Gosh Yasht and Zamyad Yasht; however, Anahita instead granted Kay Khosrow his wish to slay him. This is achieved with the help of Haoma, who overcomes and delivers him to Khosrow. He is slain near the Čīčhast (possibly either referring to Hamun Lake in Sistan or some unknown lake in today's Central Asia).

== In later sources ==
According to Islamic sources, Afrasiab was a descendant of Tur (Avestan: Tūriya-), one of the three sons of the Iranian mythical king Fereydun (the other two sons being Salm and Iraj). In the Bundahishn, he is named as the seventh grandson of Tur who built a mansion that was quote “built underneath the earth with sorcery. By the light of the mansion, the night was shining like the day. Four rivers flowed under it, one of water, one of wine, one of milk, and one of beaten sour milk. The sun's place and the moon's place in motion are arrayed in it. The height of the mansion was of one thousand men of average height.”

== In the Shahnameh ==
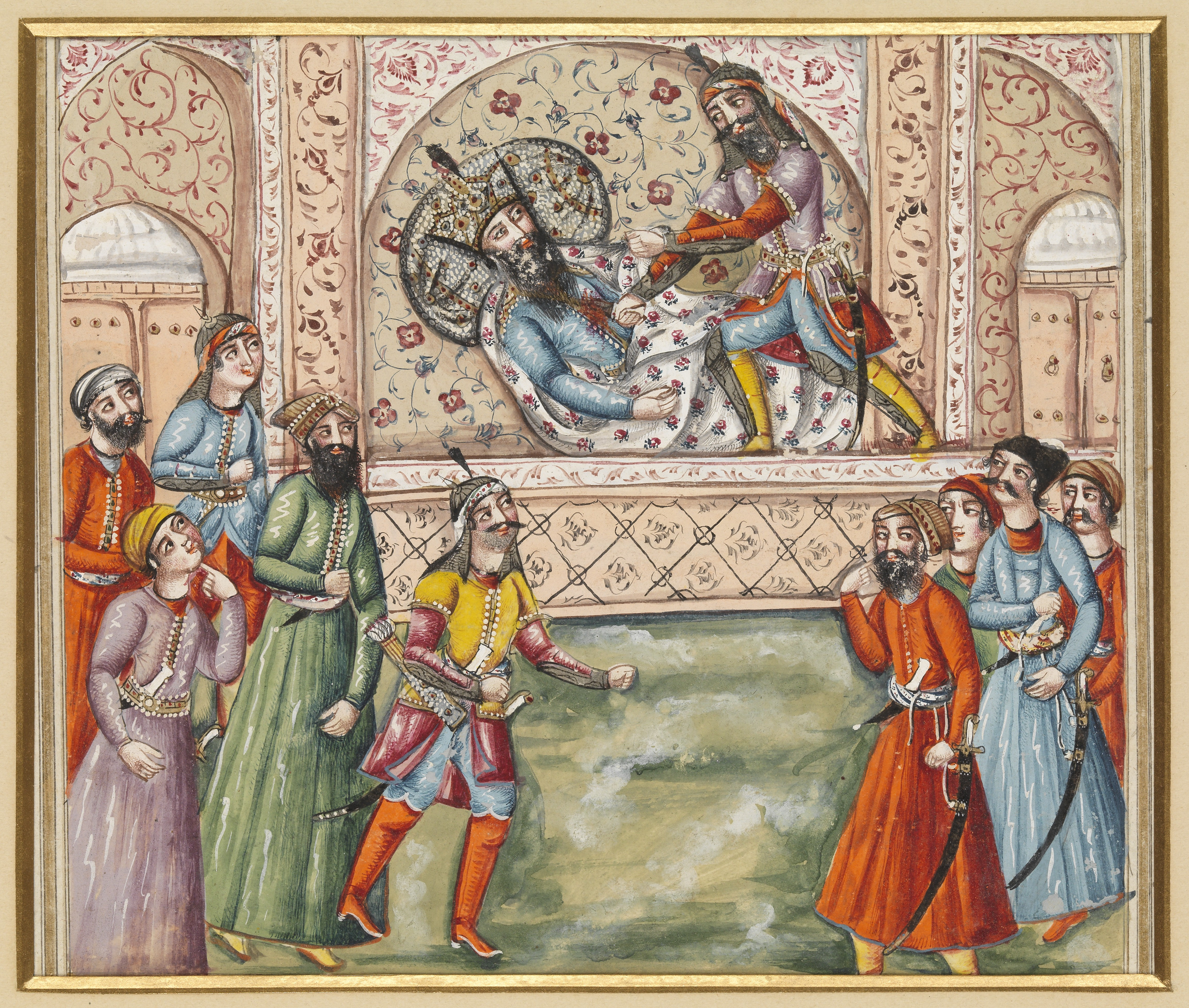
Scene from the Shahnameh. Afrasiab (standing figure) executes Nauzar (lying down)

According to the Shahnameh (Book of Kings) by the Persian epic poet Ferdowsi, Afrasiab was the king and hero of Turan and an archenemy of Iran. He is the most prominent of all Turanian kings in Iranian mythology. He is a great warrior, an able commander, and an agent of Ahriman. He possesses supernatural powers and is intent on destroying the Iranian lands. He is the brother of Garsivaz and the son of Pashang. He was an enemy of Rostam and Kay Khosrow, and was defeated by them. According to the Shahnameh, he met his death in a cave known as the Hang-e Afrasiab, or the dying place of Afrasiab, on a mountaintop in Azerbaijan. The fugitive Afrasiab, having been repeatedly defeated by the armies of the mythical King of Iran Kay Khosrow (who happened to be Afrasiab's grandson, through his daughter Farangis), wandered wretchedly and fearfully around, and eventually took refuge in this cave and died.

== Hypotheses ==
Ernst Hertzfeld believed that the name Parsondes is etymologically identical to the name Afrasiab. Tabari in his works mentions the derivative Afrasiab / Aspandiat under the name of the Hephthalite king Akhshunvar or Akhshunvaz.

== See also ==
- Afrasiyab (Samarkand)
- Afrasiab Museum of Samarkand
- Alp Er Tunga
