= Sador =

Sador can mean:

- Gamma Cygni, a star commonly known as Sadr or Sador
- Sador, the chief villain in the movie Battle Beyond the Stars
- Sador, a fictional place in the Obernewtyn Chronicles
- Sador Andor, a novel by Dilara Hashim

== See also ==
- Sadr (disambiguation)
- Sodor (disambiguation)
