= Sadri (name) =

Sadri is both a surname and a given name. Notable people with the name include:

== Surname ==
- Ahmad Sadri, Iranian sociologist
- Asghar Sadri (born 1957), Iranian football player
- Hossein Sadri (born 1979), Iranian architect
- John Sadri (born 1956), American tennis player
- Mahmoud Sadri, Iranian sociologist
- Mohammad Sadri (born 1963), Iranian film director

== Given name ==
- Sadri Ahmeti (1939–2010), Albanian painter and poet
- Sadri Alışık (1925–1995), Turkish film actor
- Sadri Gjonbalaj (born 1966), Yugoslavian-American (of Albanian origin) soccer forward
- Sadri Khiari (born 1958), Tunisian activist
- Sadri Maksudi Arsal (1878–1957), Tatar and Turkish statesman, scholar and thinker
