= Sadri (disambiguation) =

Sadri is a town and a municipality in Pali district in Rajasthan, India.

Sadri may also refer to:

- Sadri (name), a surname and given name
- Sadri language or Nagpuri, an Indo-Aryan language spoken in the Chota Nagpur Plateau of India
- Sadri Abazi or the Socialist Party of Albania
- Bari Sadri a city in Rajasthan, India
- Chhoti Sadri, a city in Rajasthan, India
- Sadri (clothing), a type of jacket

== See also ==
- Sadr (disambiguation)
- Sadan (disambiguation)
- Nagpuri (disambiguation)
