= Satr =

Satr or SATR may refer to:

- Reconquista Airport, Argentina (by ICAO code)
- Satr, a period of concealment in Isma'ili belief
- Small Arms Transmitter Receiver (a technology associated with Laser Tag Equipment)
- Satr - Intimate parts in Islam

== See also ==
- Sadr (disambiguation)
