= Mahmoud Saeed =

Iraqi-American novelist (1939–2025)

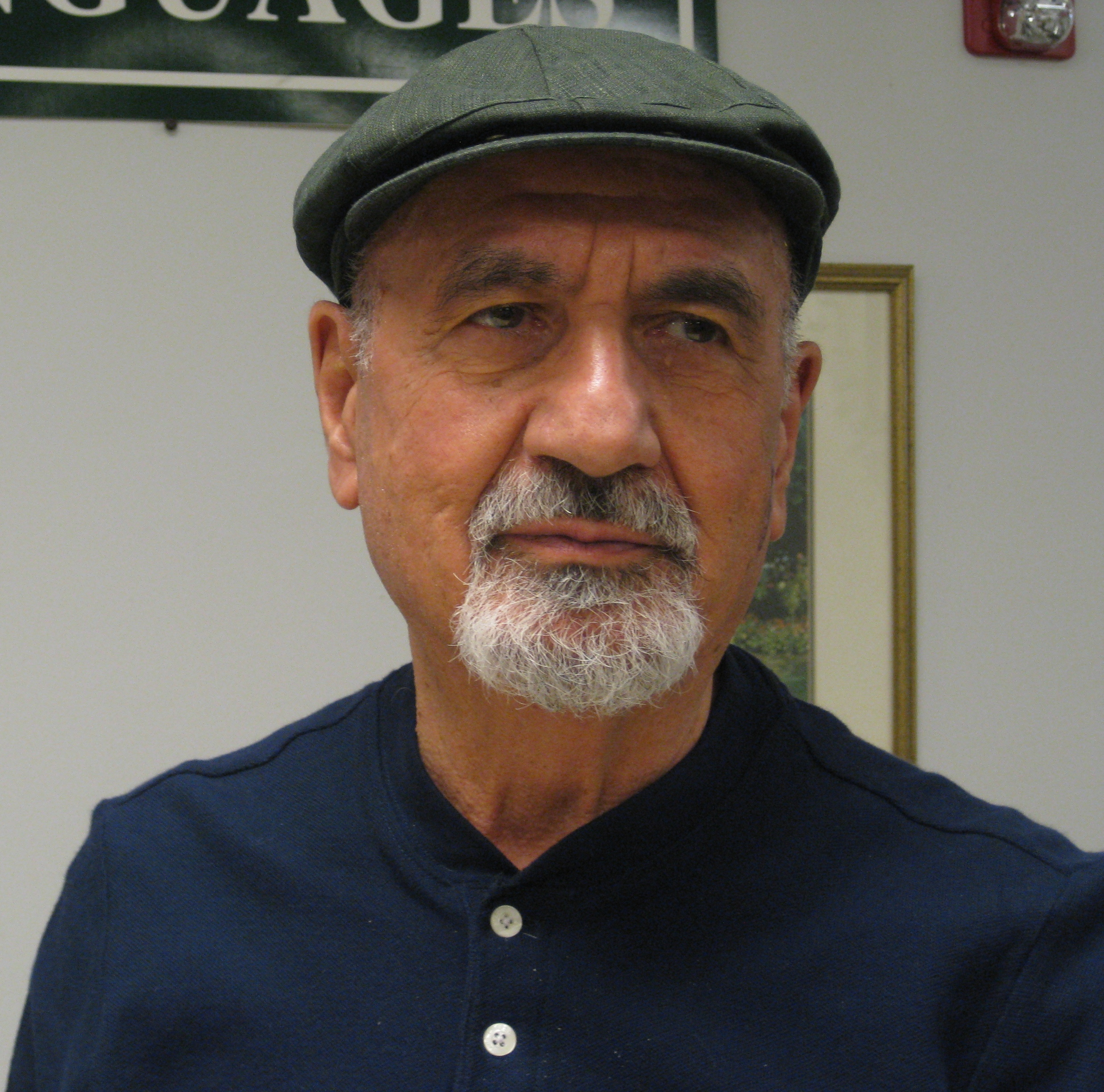
- Saeed at DePaul University in 2011
- Born: 1939; Mosul, Iraq
- Died: 28 January 2025 (aged 86); Chicago, Illinois, U.S.
- Citizenship: United States
- Occupations: Novelist, short story author, professor
- Writing career
- Language: Arabic
- Notable work: Sadaam City (I am the One Who Saw)

Mahmoud Saeed (Arabic: محمود سعيد; 1939 – 28 January 2025) was an Iraqi-born American novelist.

Born in Mosul, Saeed wrote more than 20 novels and short story collections, and hundreds of articles. He started writing short stories at an early age. Saeed wrote an award-winning short story in the Newspaper "Fata Al-Iraq, Newspaper" in 1956. He published a collection of short stories, Port Saeed and other stories, in 1957. In 1963, the government after 1963 coup destroyed his two novel manuscripts one under review, "The Old Case" and "The Strike".

Government censorship prevented his novel Rhythm and Obsession from being published in 1968, and banned his novel Rue Ben Barka, in 1970. Rue Ben Barka was published fifteen years later in Egypt 1985, Jordan 1992/1993, and Beirut in 1997. Authorities banned the publication of any book written by the author from 1963 to 2008. His most important novels after Ben Barka Lane are The Girls of Jacob, The World Through the Angel's Eyes, I am the One Who Saw, and Trilogy of Chicago.

== Career ==
=== American University of Iraq at Sulaimani ===
Saeed was the first writer-in-residence at the American University of Iraq at Sulaimani, where he taught calligraphy. He had previously taught intermediate and advanced Arabic language courses at DePaul University and Arab Culture and Iraqi Political history.

=== Saddam City ===
Saddam City, published in 2004 by Dar Al-Saqi in London, is Saeed's most famous novel. The title was changed from the original Arabic title, I am the One Who Saw (Arabic: أنا الذي رأى) (ISBN 9780863563508), and was translated into English by Lake Forest College sociology professor Ahmad Sadri. The book was later translated and published in Italian with the same title.

Saddam City depicts the fear and despair of Baghdad schoolteacher Mustafa Ali Noman as he is shuttled from one prison to another after being detained by Iraqi security forces during the heights of Saddam Hussein's rule in the 1970s. The senselessness of his arrest and the torture he and other prisoners endure drive Mustafa to see Hussein's Iraq as a place where "being free only meant one thing: imminent arrest." The novel is based on the true experience of Saeed's experiences as a political prisoner in Iraq.

The book has been received well by critics, one of which called Saeed's novel "... bracingly convincing ... a simply beautiful, though inevitably harrowing, tale." Amazon.com also wrote that "Mahmoud Saeed's devastating novel evokes the works of Kafka, Solzhenitsyn and Elie Wiesel. It is a vivid account of the wanton and brutal treatment of the Iraqi people by Saddam Hussein's feared secret police and of the arbitrariness of life under tyranny." The novel has been applauded for highlighting positive aspects of Arab and Iraqi culture, including friendship, community, respect, generosity, and hospitality. Saddam City was also considered one of the best 56 novels in the world by the website Library Thing.

According to the author, the original transcript of the novel included two additional chapters. These, however, were censored from the novel by the Arab literature guild in Damascus, Syria. Because of this, he instead initially published it under a pen name, Mustafa Ali Nooman in 1981. The book was republished in Cairo, Egypt under his real name in 2006.

== Death ==
Saeed died in Chicago, Illinois, on 28 January 2025, at the age of 86.

== Publications ==
- 1955 – Ominous Gun This short story won the Prize of Fata Al Iraq Newspaper (Iraqi Young).
- 1957 – Port Saeed and Other Stories. Short stories. Baghdad. There is a copy in the National Library in Baghdad
- 1963 – The Old Case. Novel. Published in Baghdad by the Iraqi Writers Union, but was destroyed a few days later when the coup changed the government.
- 1968 – Rhythm and obsession. Novel. The government prevented the novel from being published, but it was eventually published in Syria. Almada House Damascus. 1995.
- 1970 – Rue Ben Barka. Novel. It was banned in Iraq. It was published in Cairo in 1987 - ISBN 978-1-56656-926-2, then in Dar Caramel Amman, Jordan in 1993. It was published again in Dar al-Carmel, Jordan in 1995, then in the House of Arts in Beirut, Lebanon in 1997. It won the Ministry of Information Award in 1994.
- 1981 – I am The One Who Saw. Novel. Syrian censorship deleted two chapters of it then refused to publish it. In 1995, it was published in Dar Al Mada, Syria. Written with the pen-name of Mustafa Ali Noman.
- 1996 – End of the Day. Novel. Club Story award. Cairo 1996. Published at Dar Al-Hayat. Beirut.
- 1997 – Birds of Love, and War. Short story collection. House Sina. Cairo.
- 1998 – Beautiful Death. Novel. Damascus. Dar Al Mada Syria.
- 1999 – "Courageous Woman." Children's short story. Won the Sheikha Fatima Award.
- 1999 – Before Love, After Love. Novel. Damascus. Dar Al Mada Syria.
- 2003 – Aldhalan. Novel. House of Arts. Beirut.
- 2003 – Saddam City (translated title of I am the One Who Saw). Dar Al-Saqi. London. ISBN 9780863563508
- 2005 – Almunsdh. Short stories collections. Cairo.
- 2006 – Two Lost Souls (translated title of Aldhalan in English). Chicago. (ISBN 9780977831104)
- 2006 – I am The One Who Saw. The full novel (including censored sections). Dar Al-Hilal. Cairo.
- 2006 – The World through the Eyes of the Angels. Novel. Merritt House. Cairo.
- 2007 – Girls of Jacob. Novel. Nelson House. Beirut.
- 2008 – (Bitter Morning. And A Figure in Repose) two Short story, Published in short story collection: Contemporary Iraqi Fiction. Translated by Dr. Shaker Mustafa, Syracuse Press. Syracuse.
- 2008 – Girls of Jacob. Novel. Fadaat House. Amman. Jordan.
- 2008 – Trilogy of Chicago. Novels, House of Afaaq- Horizons. Cairo.
- 2008 – I am The One Who Saw. Novel, chosen as one of the top 56 novels in the world by Library Thing.
- 2009 – Warriors of the Sky, Short story. Published in the collection Freedom: Short stories Celebrating the Universal Declaration of Human Rights. Mahmoud Saeed was chosen by Amnesty International (among thirty-seven international writers) to write this short story on the principles of the United Nations.
- 2009 – Soldier and Pigs. Collection of short stories, Dar Fadaat House. Amman.
- 2009 – Paris Evening. Collection of short stories. Dar Fadaat House. Amman.
- 2010 – Stab. Novel. Dar Fadaat House. Amman. Jordan.
- 2011 – Ash Shahenah "The Truck" Shams house, Cairo-Egypt.
- 2011 – Deer Valley. Novel. Arab Institute for Research and Publishing. Amman.Jordan.
- 2011 – Leap frog. Novel. Dar Alghawoon. Beiroth Lebanon.
- 2012 – The world through the eyes of Angels. New York. Syracuse University.
- 2012 – Nozzle in space. novel. Sharq gharb publishing house. Beirut Lebanon.
- Lizards' Colony, short story, World literature today, published it and nominated it to pushcart, and nominated to pushcart November 2012.
- 2013. Brooklyn rail magazine, love and demonstration, and nominated to pushcart [www.Brooklyn rail magazine, love and demonstration, Mahmoud Saeed, 3 May 2013]
- 2013 June – Ben Barka Lane in English by Interlink Publishing House, New York.
- 2014 Yunus and Yusuf Brooklyn Rail.
- 2014 hunting wild ducks, in Arabic. Defaf publishing. Qater.
- 2014- 15 May, The Gild Literary Complex chooses 25 writers from all over Chicago to celebrate 25 anniversary of the Guild Literary Complex.
- 2015. December. A portal in Space. University of taxes press. library of congress: 2015943881 ISBN 978-1-4773-0810-3

He wrote hundreds of articles and short stories in magazines and Newspapers the following: Al-Adab. Beirut. Life. London. Al-Quds Al-Arabi. London. Azzaman. London. Al-Khalige. Sharjah. Al-Ithad. Abu Dhabi. Lotus. Tunisia. Damascus. Range - Damascus. New culture - Damascus. Literary News - Cairo. Egyptian Al-Ahram, Al-Jadid. Los Angeles. Alienation - London. Magazine story, "London." Stream Magazine - Sharjah. Banipal - London. Nizwa, Sultanate of Oman, Boy Mosul, Fatal Iraq, Iraq / Iraq, and many others.

- 2016- 8 July, Beijing "China" the Asian's greatest two reformers: Muhammad and confucius.
- 2016- 13 October, CNN interview
- 2016- 26 November- The New York Times, published an article of Mahmoud Saeed
- 2016- 30 November-The New York Times, published an article remembered what was discrib Mahmoud Said in his novel "Saddam City" for the tragedies in Iraq.
- 2017- Lasta, Al-Awal. (You are not the first - Dar Dafaf). a novel. defafpub. Iraqi Authentication Number. Books and documents. Baghdad. 726 -2017
- 2017- 3 September, newspaper article قصة قصيرة: إن كنت تعرف القسم الذي تقصده فاضغط aawsat.com
- 2017- §Middle east newspaper, London, 14182 September 26- Tuesday (the hat)
- 2017- Defeats and victories. هزائم وانتصارات. a novel. House of Cultural Affairs. "Ministry of Culture" . Baghdad. Dec. 2017.
- 2018- The Magician. collection of stories. Defaf house. Qatar Baghdad. 2018.
- 2018 Waiting for the Great Savior "novel" بانتظار المنقذ الأعظم. Beirut, Lebanon. Arab Scientific Publisheres. Inc. ISBN 978-614-01-2535-3.
- 2019 "مجموعة قصص. مستعمرة العظاءات"lizards colony. Egypt. Cairo. ISBN 978-977-6688-05-6.
- 2019 Saddam City, in (Indian language: Malayalam. ISBN 978-93-88087-25-4, translated by: DR, Sayed A Qudsi.
- 2019,13- February, An Article about (Waiting for the Great Savior) in Arabic (Al Quds Al Arabi), Magid Alkhatib. Al Quds Al Arabi
- 2019 - A Portal in Space, in (Indian Language: (Malayalam) ISBN 978-81-300-2151-5 translated by: Dr Shamnad.

== Awards ==
- Best Short Story: Ominous Gun. Short story. Fata Al Iraq. Mosel. 1957.
- Rue bin Baraka, a novel, won the Iraqi Ministry of Information Award in 1993.
- The End of the Day, a novel, won the Story Club award in Egypt in 1996.
- The Woman Who Triumphed Over the Mongols, a short story, was the winner of the Sheikha Fatima Award in Abu Dhabi in 1999.
- The World Through the Eyes of the Angels, a novel, won the King Fahd MEST Center for Arabic Literature Translation Award. November 2010
