= Shahnameh =

Epic poem by Ferdowsi

- by Ferdowsi
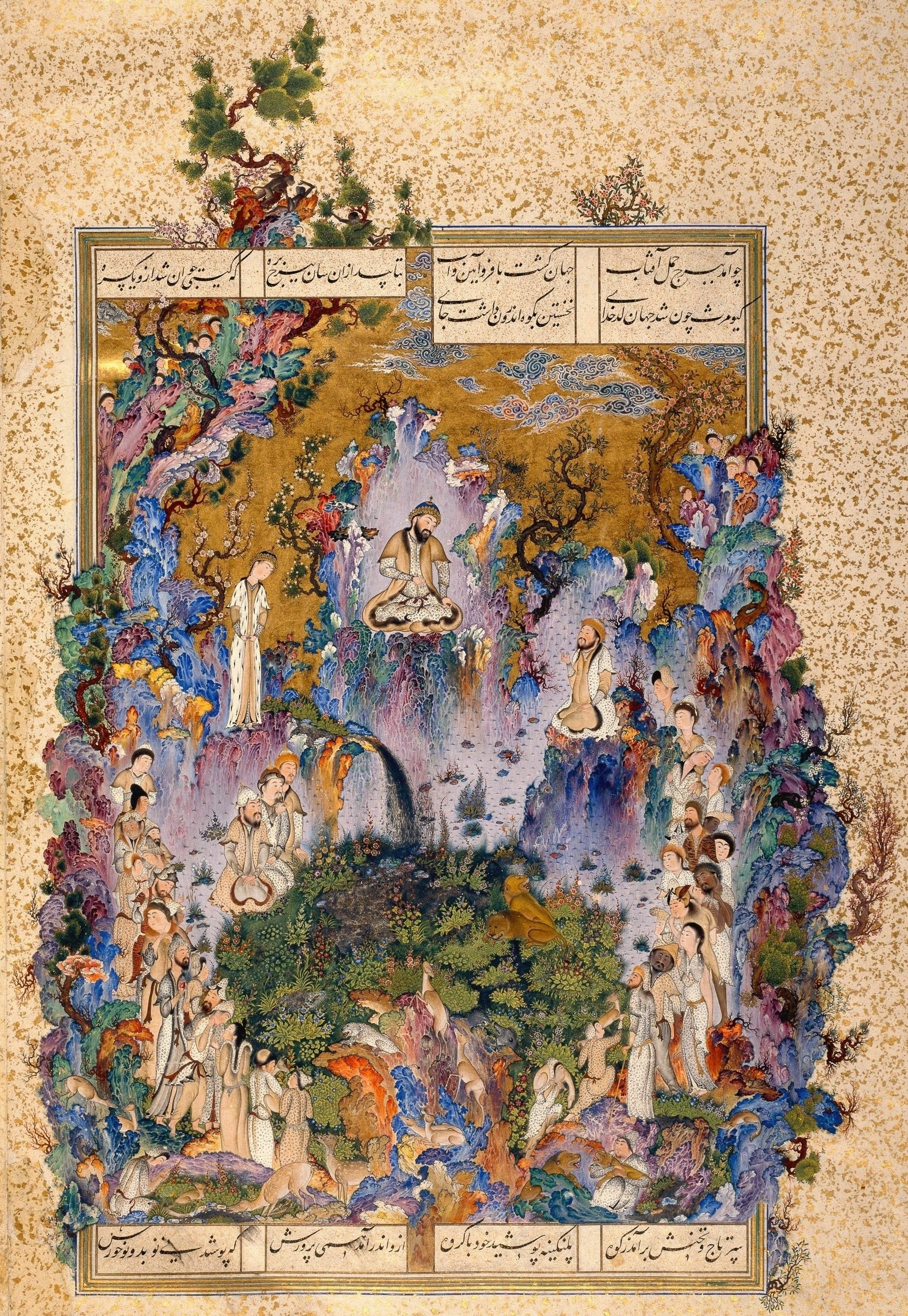
- Court of Keyumars, 16th century miniature by Sultan Muhammad from the Shahnameh of Shah Tahmasp, Aga Khan Museum
- Original title: شاهنامه
- Written: 977–1010 CE
- Country: Greater Iran (modern-day Iran and Afghanistan)
- Language: Classical Persian
- Subject(s): Persian mythology, history of Iran
- Genre: Epic poem
- Meter: Two rhyming couplets of 22 syllables in the same meter
- Publication date: 1010
- Published in English: 1832
- Media type: Manuscript
- Lines: c. 50,000 depending on manuscript

Full text
- Shah Nameh at Wikisource

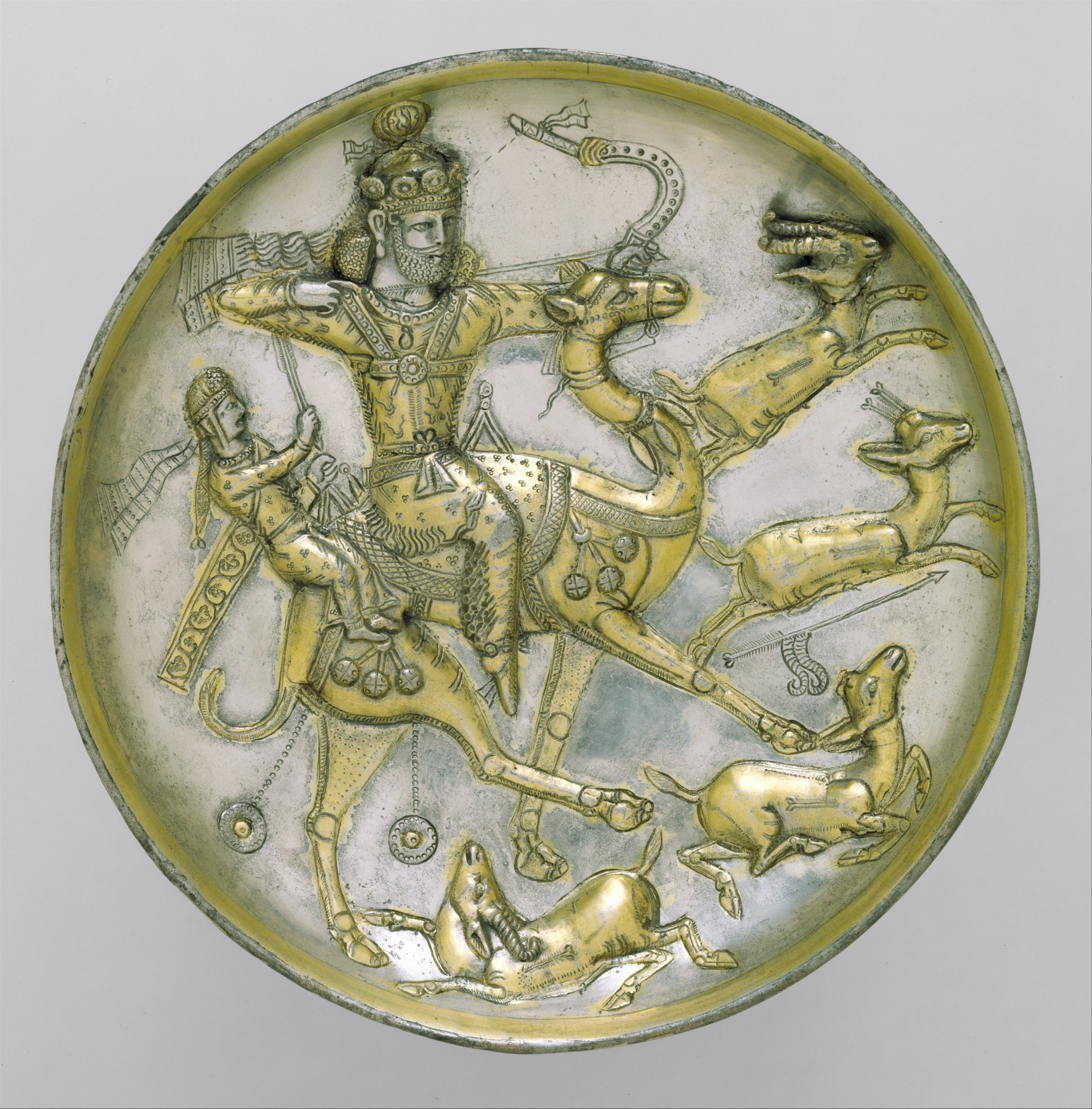
Plate with a hunting scene from the tale of Bahram Gur and Azadeh. The imagery on this plate represents the earliest known depiction of a well-known episode from the story of Bahram Gur, which seems to have been popular for centuries, but was only recorded in the Shahnameh, centuries after this plate was created. Iran, c. 5th century A.D. Metropolitan Museum of Art

The Shahnameh, (Note: Modern Iranian Persian: شاهنامه, romanized: Shāhnāmeh, pronounced [ʃɒːh.nɒː.ˈme].) also romanized Shahnama (Note: Classical Persian: شاهنامه, romanized: Šāhnāma, reconstructed pronunciation: [ʃaːh.naː.ˈma].) (Note: Other romanisations and anglicisations include Šāhnāmeh, Shahnamah, Šahname, Shaahnaameh or Şahname.) (lit. 'Book of Kings'), is a long epic poem written by the Persian poet Ferdowsi between c. 977 and 1010 CE and is the national epic of Greater Iran. Consisting of some 50,000 distichs or couplets (two-line verses), the Shahnameh is one of the world's longest epic poems, and the longest epic poem created by a single author. It tells of the mainly mythical but to some extent historical past of Iran from the creation of the world until the Muslim conquest in the seventh century. Iran, Afghanistan, Azerbaijan, Tajikistan and the greater region influenced by Persian culture such as Armenia, Dagestan, Georgia, Turkey, Turkmenistan and Uzbekistan celebrate this national epic. It took Ferdowsi 33 years to complete the Shahnameh in its entirety.

The work is of central importance in Persian culture and Persian language. It is regarded as a literary masterpiece, and is the definitive work of the ethno-national cultural identity of Iran.

== Composition ==
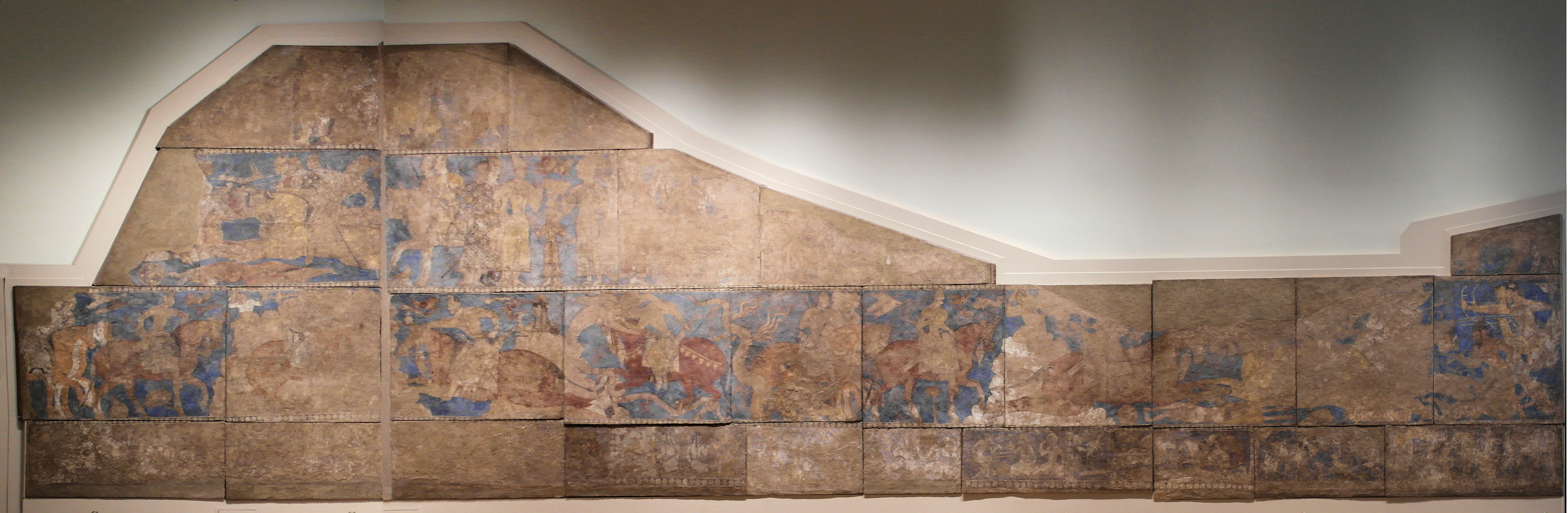
'Rostam cycle', fragment of the Penjikent murals in the Hermitage Museum. 7-8th-century

Ferdowsi began writing the Shahnameh in 977 AD and completed it on 8 March 1010. The Shahnameh is a monument of poetry and historiography, being mainly the poetical recast of what Ferdowsi, his contemporaries, and his predecessors regarded as the account of Iran's ancient history. Many such accounts already existed in prose, an example being the Shahnameh of Abu-Mansur. A small portion of Ferdowsi's work, in passages scattered throughout the Shahnameh, is entirely of his own conception.

The Shahnameh is an epic poem of over 50,000 couplets written in Early New Persian. It is based mainly on a prose work of the same name compiled in Ferdowsi's earlier life in his native Tus. This prose Shahnameh was in turn and for the most part the translation of a Pahlavi (Middle Persian) work, known as the Khwadāy-Nāmag "Book of Kings", a late Sasanian compilation of the history of the kings and heroes of Persia from mythical times down to the reign of Khosrow II (590–628). The Khwadāy-Nāmag contained historical information on the later Sasanian period, but it does not appear to have drawn on any historical sources for the earlier Sasanian period (3rd to 4th centuries). Ferdowsi added material continuing the story to the overthrow of the Sasanians by the Muslim armies in the middle of the seventh century.

The first to undertake the versification of the Pahlavi chronicle was Daqiqi, a contemporary of Ferdowsi, poet at the court of the Samanid Empire, who came to a violent end after completing only 1,000 verses. These verses, which deal with the rise of the prophet Zoroaster, were afterward incorporated by Ferdowsi, with acknowledgment, in his own poem. The style of the Shahnameh shows characteristics of both written and oral literature. Some claim that Ferdowsi also used Zoroastrian nasks, such as the now-lost Chihrdad, as sources as well.

Many other Pahlavi sources were used in composing the epic, prominent being the Kar-Namag i Ardashir i Pabagan, which was originally written during the late Sassanid era and gave accounts of how Ardashir I came to power which, because of its historical proximity, is thought to be highly accurate. The text is written in the late Middle Persian, which was the immediate ancestor of Modern Persian. A great portion of the historical chronicles given in Shahnameh are based on this epic and there are in fact various phrases and words which can be matched between Ferdowsi's poem and this source, according to Zabihollah Safa.

== Content ==
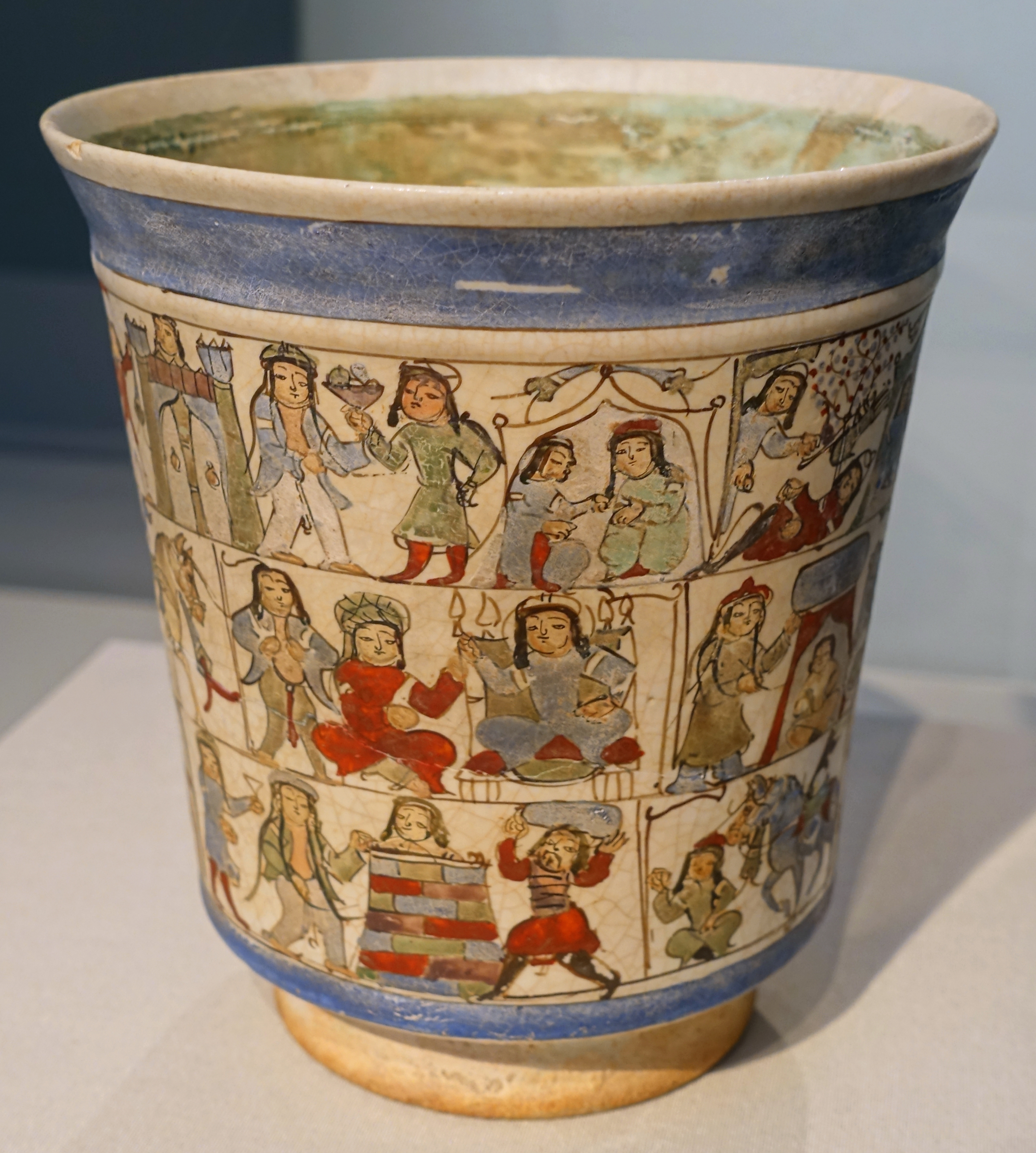
Beaker (mina'i ware) illustrating the story of Bijan and Manijeh. Iran, late 12th century. Freer Gallery of Art

Traditional historiography in Iran holds that Ferdowsi was grieved by the fall of the Sasanian Empire and its subsequent rule by Arabs and Turks. The Shahnameh, the argument goes, is largely his effort to preserve the memory of Persia's golden days and transmit it to a new generation, so that, by learning from it, they could acquire the knowledge needed to build a better world. Although most scholars have contended that Ferdowsi's main concern was the preservation of the pre-Islamic legacy of myth and history, a number of authors have formally challenged this view.

=== Mythical age ===
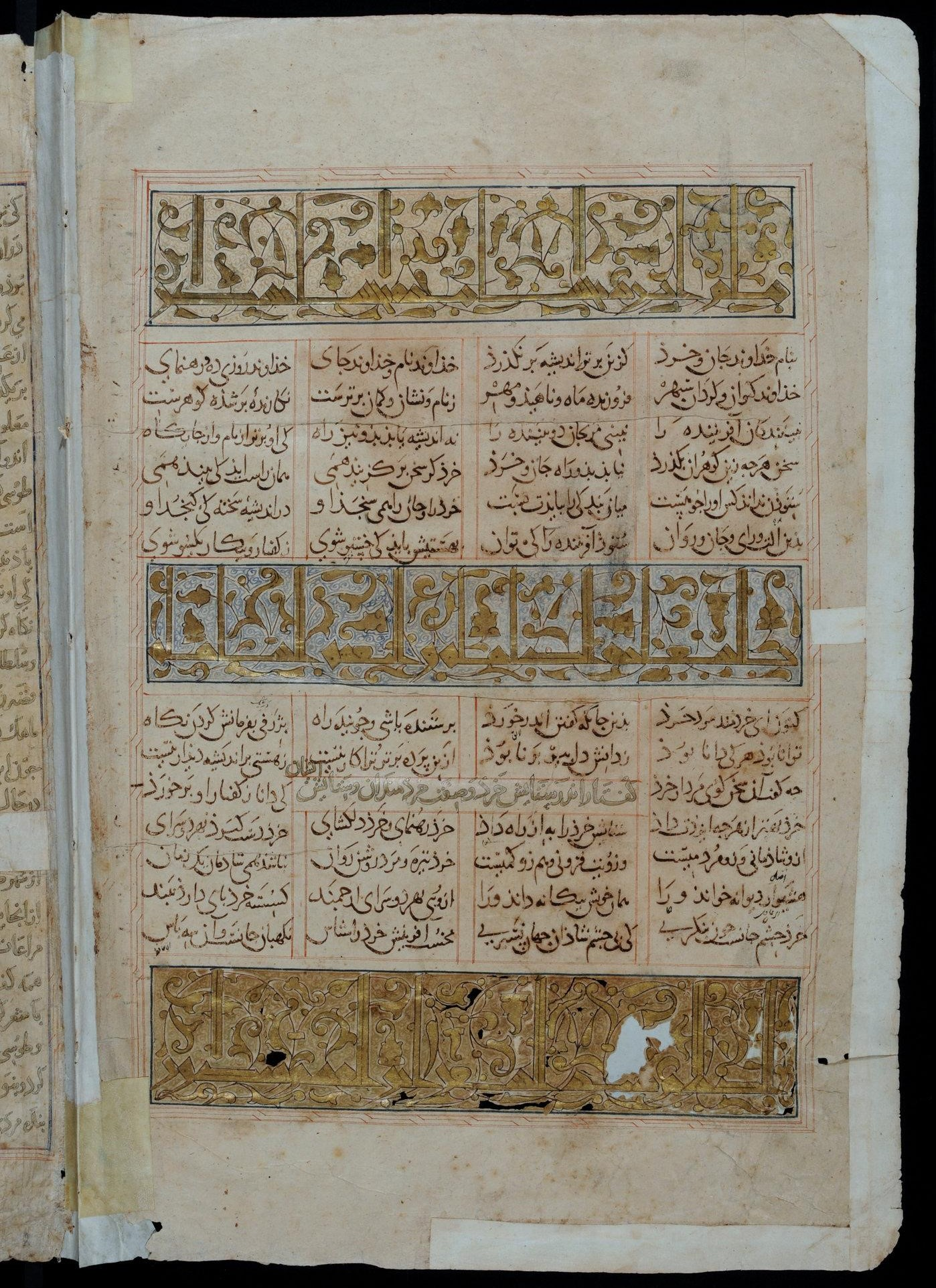
Page from the Florence Shahnameh, the oldest known Shahnameh manuscript. Anatolia, 1217. National Central Library of Florence

This portion of the Shahnameh is relatively short, amounting to some 2100 verses or four percent of the entire book.

After an opening in praise of God and Wisdom, the Shahnameh gives an account of the creation of the world and of man as believed by the Sasanians. This introduction is followed by the story of the first man, Keyumars, who also became the first king after a period of mountain-dwelling. His grandson Hushang, son of Siamak, accidentally discovered fire and established the Sadeh Feast in its honor. Stories of Tahmuras, Jamshid, Zahhak, Kawa or Kaveh, Fereydun and his three sons Salm, Tur, and Iraj, and his grandson Manuchehr are related in this section.

=== Heroic age ===
Almost two-thirds of the Shahnameh are devoted to the age of heroes, extending from Manuchehr's reign until the conquest of Alexander the Great. This age is also identified as the kingdom of the Kayanians, which established a long history of heroic age in which myth and legend are combined. The main feature of this period is the major role played by the Saka or Sistani heroes who appear as the backbone of the Empire. Garshasp is briefly mentioned with his son Nariman, whose own son Sam acted as the leading paladin of Manuchehr while reigning in Sistan in his own right. His successors were his son Zal and Zal's son Rostam, the bravest of the brave, and then Faramarz.

Among the stories described in this section are the romance of Zal and Rudaba, the Seven Stages (or Labors) of Rostam, Rostam and Sohrab, Siyavash and Sudaba, Rostam and Akvan Div, the romance of Bijan and Manijeh, the wars with Afrasiab, Daqiqi's account of the story of Goshtasp and Arjasp, and Rostam and Esfandyar.

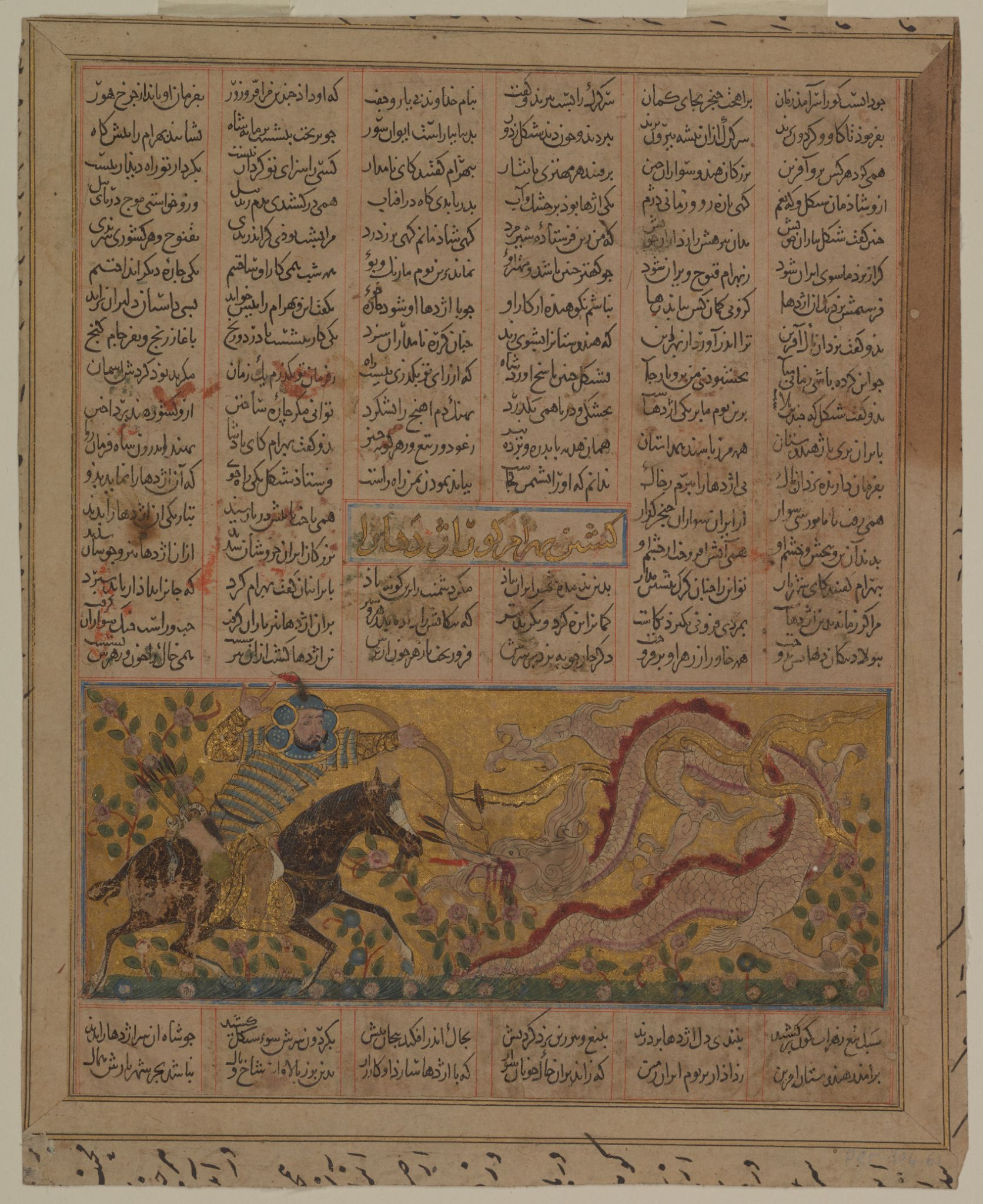
Bahram Gur kills a dragon in India, folio from the First Small Shahanama. Possibly Tabriz, c. 1300. Chester Beatty Library

=== Historical age ===
A brief mention of the Arsacid (Parthian) dynasty follows the history of Alexander and precedes that of Ardashir I, founder of the Sasanian Empire. After this, Sasanian history is related with a good deal of accuracy. The fall of the Sassanids and the Arab conquest of Persia are narrated romantically.

=== Message ===
According to Jalal Khaleghi Mutlaq, the Shahnameh teaches a wide variety of moral virtues, like worship of one God; religious uprightness; patriotism; love of wife, family and children; and helping the poor.

There are themes in the Shahnameh that were viewed with suspicion by the succession of Iranian regimes. During the reign of Mohammad Reza Shah, the epic was largely ignored in favor of the more abstruse, esoteric and dryly intellectual Persian literature. Historians note that the theme of regicide and the incompetence of kings embedded in the epic did not sit well with the Iranian monarchy. Later, there were Muslim figures such as Ali Shariati, the hero of Islamic reformist youth of the 1970s, who were also antagonistic towards the contents of the Shahnameh since it included verses critical of Islam. These include the line: tofu bar to, ey charkh-i gardun, tofu! (spit on your face, oh heavens spit!), which Ferdowsi used as a reference to the Muslim invaders who despoiled Zoroastrianism.

== Historical analysis ==
According to orientalist scholars Josef Markwart and Theodor Nöldeke, much of the story and world of the Shahnameh incorporated Parthian history that was reshaped by Ferdowsi. By Ferdowsi's time, much of Parthian history itself had already been altered through varying narratives originating during the Sasanian period.

The character of Rostam was also not an invention of Ferdowsi. By the end of the Sasanian period, legends of Rostam were well known across all Iranian lands. Ferdowsi was chiefly responsible for glorifying his fame. A substantial collection of Pahlavi texts spoke of the legend of Rostam. Josef Markwart traced the background of Rostam, showing his Parthian (Arsacid) origins. The home of Rostam in the Shahnameh was Sakastan, the ancestral seat of the House of Suren, (Note: This is also the House in which the Parthian General Surena originated from.) one of the seven Great Parthian Families of Iran (the Seven Parthian Clans). This indicates that the House of Rostam, in the epic, is directly parallel to a Parthian noble house. Rostam's dragon banner was also directly influenced by the Parthians.

Various other miscellaneous elements of the Shahnameh are influenced by Iranian history too. The narratives found in the Pahlavi texts influenced Ferdowsi's world of the Shahnameh, specifically with regards to the construction of the Babylon being attributed to the Pishdādian kings, two of these being Tahmuras and Jamshid. Additionally, the Bundahishn credits Manuchehr with creating the Euphrates, which also referenced in the epic. The centuries-long lifespan attributed to some of the Pishdādian and to most of the Kayanian kings in the Shahnameh directly parallel the durations of the Bronze Age and Iron Age. The heroes of the Shahnameh were meant to reflect the lifespan of city-states themselves, meaning many characters directly reflected political entities of history.

Scholars have also argued that the Shahnameh was the historical expression of Iran's national character over the course of its existence up until the emergence of Islam. Ferdowsi composed the Shahnameh based on all the lore and surviving records of pre-Islamic Iran, both oral and written, that were available to him. The Shahnameh was also replete with moral philosophy and subtle moral lessons relevant for the period. According to Afshin Zand:

The Shahnameh contains timeless pieces of moral philosophy. They occur naturally in the course of events and are intertwined with stories and with the verse, and the music the verse produces in citation. Since Ferdowsy was recounting events of history or legends, he generally did not devote whole sections exclusively to moral philosophy like the odes of Rumi, Hafez or the quatrains of Khayyam which contain concisely in one place the philosophical thought of the poet.

Other scholars have applied the structuralist theory of Claude Lévi-Strauss to the Shahnameh, demonstrating that the influences behind the epic were inspired by underlying structural factors like culture, religion, and dominant worldviews. This is expressed as the general contrast between good and evil, exemplified by factors like disparity between Rostam and Esfandiyār. The division of good and evil comes from a lack of advanced scientific perspectives that were not the forefront of phenomenological analysis during Ferdowsi's time. Consequently, Ferdowsi's work is based significantly on prior mythology and religion, such as doctrine of dualism found in Zoroastrianism. Ferdowsi's Shahnameh can be characterized as a continuation of the old Aryan, Indo-European tradition.

Historian Dariush Zolfaghari has argued that the Shahnameh presents warfare not merely as a struggle over territory, but also as a struggle over the survival of Iranian cultural identity and heritage. In this analysis, Ferdowsi is said to portray both tangible heritage and intangible heritage as central elements to the endurance of a society in times of war and conflict. Tangible heritage includes cities, fortresses, palaces, banners, and monuments, while intangible heritage are customs such as language, festivals, rituals, and collective memory. Zolfaghari proposes a dual framework where physical monuments and symbols act as forms of “cultural deterrence” by raising the moral and symbolic cost of attack, while language, ritual traditions, and narrative memory serve as “cultural prevention” by preserving identity even after destruction or invasion. The Shahnameh heroes like Rostam, Fereydun, and Kay Khosrow are interpreted both as military champions and as protectors of cultural continuity, whose success is measured by their ability to safeguard Persian identity, customs, and political legitimacy. The epic is seen as both a literary work and a cultural model for preserving national heritage during and after a war.

== Influence on Persian language ==
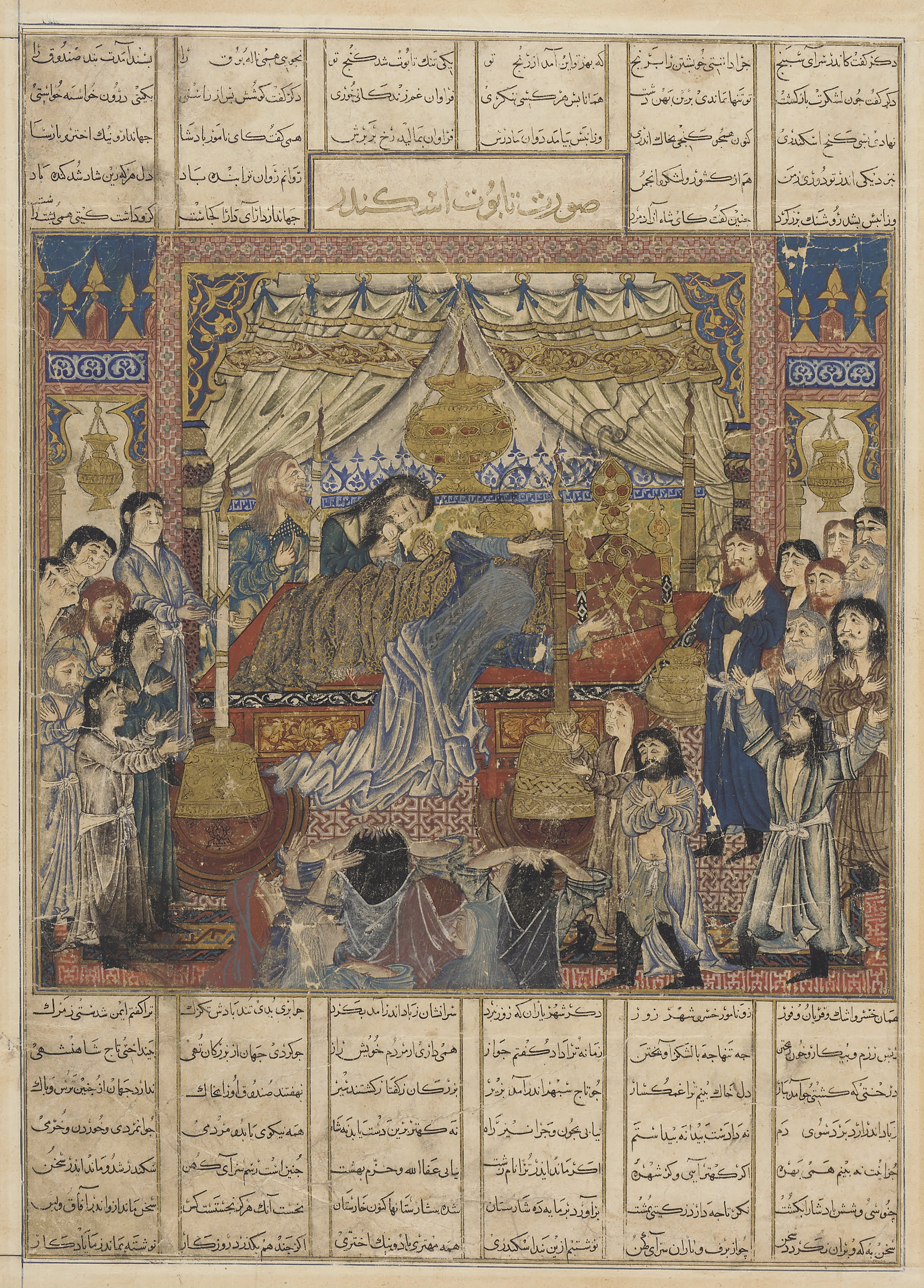
The Bier of Iskandar, folio from the Great Mongol Shahnameh. Tabriz, c. 1330. Freer Gallery of Art

After the Shahnameh, a number of other works similar in nature surfaced over the centuries within the cultural sphere of the Persian language. Without exception, all such works were based in style and method on the Shahnameh, but none of them could quite achieve the same degree of fame and popularity.

Some experts believe the main reason the Modern Persian language today is more or less the same language as that of Ferdowsi's time over 1000 years ago is due to the very existence of works like the Shahnameh, which have had lasting and profound cultural and linguistic influence. In other words, the Shahnameh itself has become one of the main pillars of the modern Persian language. Studying Ferdowsi's masterpiece also became a requirement for achieving mastery of the Persian language by subsequent Persian poets, as evidenced by numerous references to the Shahnameh in their works.

Ferdowsi purposefully avoided Arabic vocabulary in Shahnameh; a view also claimed by 19th-century British Iranologist E. G. Browne. This claim has been recently examined by modern scholarship, specifically by Mohammed Moinfar, who states that approximately 700 words are of Arabic origin, accounting for around 9% of the book's vocabulary. The overwhelming majority of Shahnameh's lexicon remains distinctly Persian in origin.

The Shahnameh has 62 stories, 990 chapters, and some 50,000 rhyming couplets, making it more than three times the length of Homer's Iliad and more than twelve times the length of the German Nibelungenlied. According to Ferdowsi himself, the final edition of the Shahnameh contained some sixty thousand distichs. But this is a round figure; most of the relatively reliable manuscripts have preserved a little over fifty thousand distichs. Nizami Aruzi reports that the final edition of the Shahnameh sent to the court of Sultan Mahmud of Ghazni was prepared in seven volumes.

== Cultural influence ==
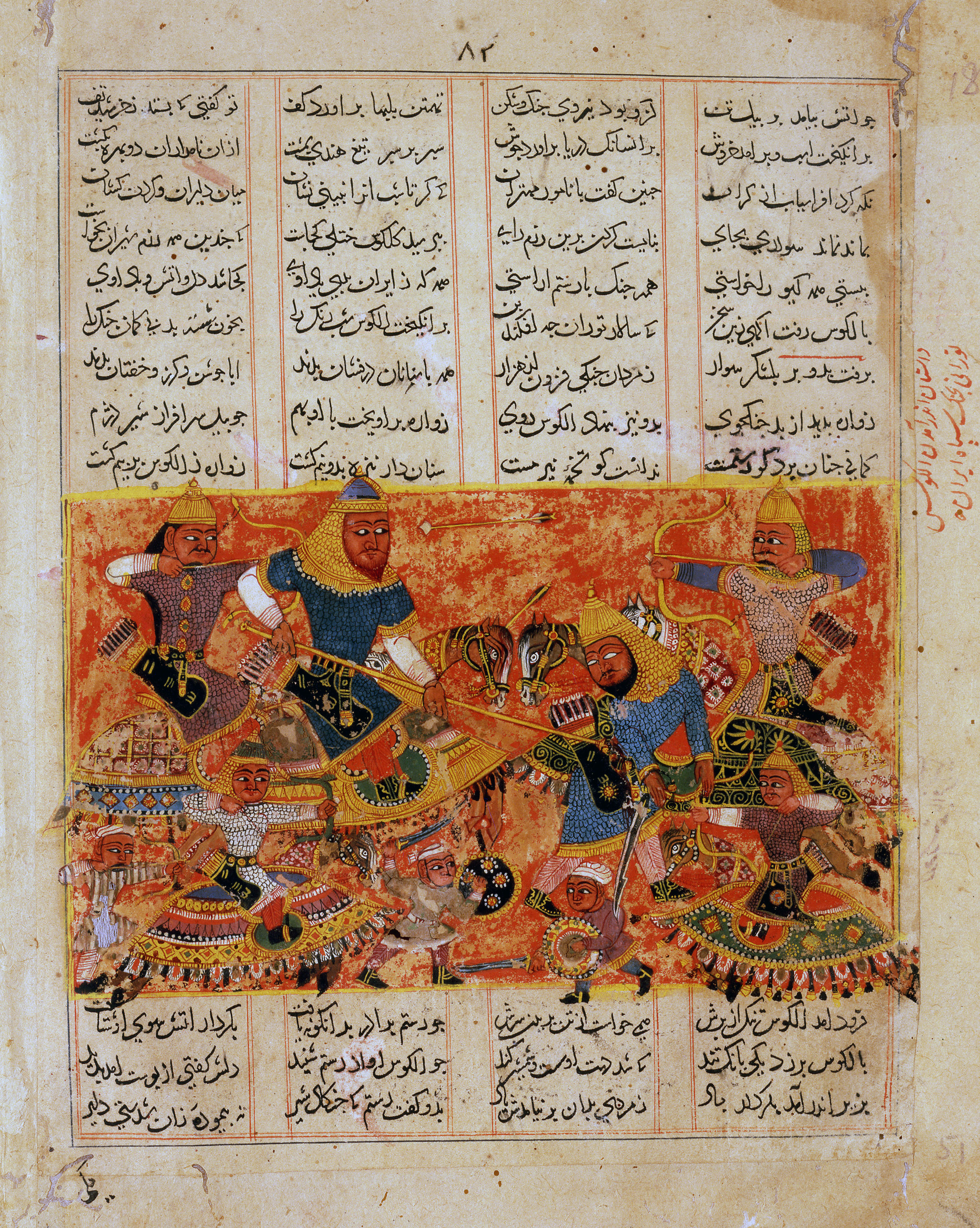
Rostam kills the Turanian hero Alkus with his lance, folio from the Jainesque Shahnama. Western India, c. 1425–1450. The David Collection

The Shirvanshah dynasty adopted many of their names from the Shahnameh. The relationship between Shirvanshah and his son, Manuchihr, is mentioned in chapter eight of Nizami's Layla and Majnun. Nizami advises the king's son to read the Shahnameh and to remember the meaningful sayings of the wise.

According to the Turkish historian Mehmet Fuat Köprülü:

Indeed, despite all claims to the contrary, there is no question that Persian influence was paramount among the Seljuks of Anatolia. This is clearly revealed by the fact that the sultans who ascended the throne after Ghiyath al-Din Kai-Khusraw I assumed titles taken from ancient Persian mythology, like Kai Khosrow, Kay Kāvus, and Kai Kobad; and that Ala' al-Din Kai-Qubad I had some passages from the Shahname inscribed on the walls of Konya and Sivas. When we take into consideration domestic life in the Konya courts and the sincerity of the favor and attachment of the rulers to Persian poets and Persian literature, then this fact [i.e., the importance of Persian influence] is undeniable.

Shah Ismail I (d.1524), the founder of the Safavid dynasty of Iran, was also deeply influenced by the Persian literary tradition, particularly by the Shahnameh, which probably explains the fact that he named all of his sons after Shahnameh characters. Dickson and Welch suggest that Ismail's Shāhnāma-i Shāhī was intended as a present to the young Tahmasp. After defeating Muhammad Shaybani's Uzbeks, Ismail asked Hatefi, a famous poet from Jam (Khorasan), to write a Shahnameh-like epic about his victories and his newly established dynasty. Although the epic was left unfinished, it was an example of mathnawis in the heroic style of the Shahnameh written later on for the Safavid kings.

The Shahnameh's influence has extended beyond the Persian sphere. Professor Victoria Arakelova of Yerevan University states:

During the ten centuries passed after Firdausi composed his monumental work, heroic legends and stories of Shahnameh have remained the main source of the storytelling for the peoples of this region: Persians, Kurds, Gurans, Talishis, Armenians, Georgians, North Caucasian peoples, etc.

The Shahnameh has defined Persian identity as resilient, due to the underlying themes of cultural preservation and the continued struggle against foreign invaders. Its storytelling portrays Iran, taken as an entity, as a body of "cultural deterrence" that inhibits the imposition of foreign culture, maintaining its essence. The Shahnameh also depicts Iranian people of heroic character as protectors of cultural continuity, exemplified through the heroic characters.

=== On Georgian identity ===
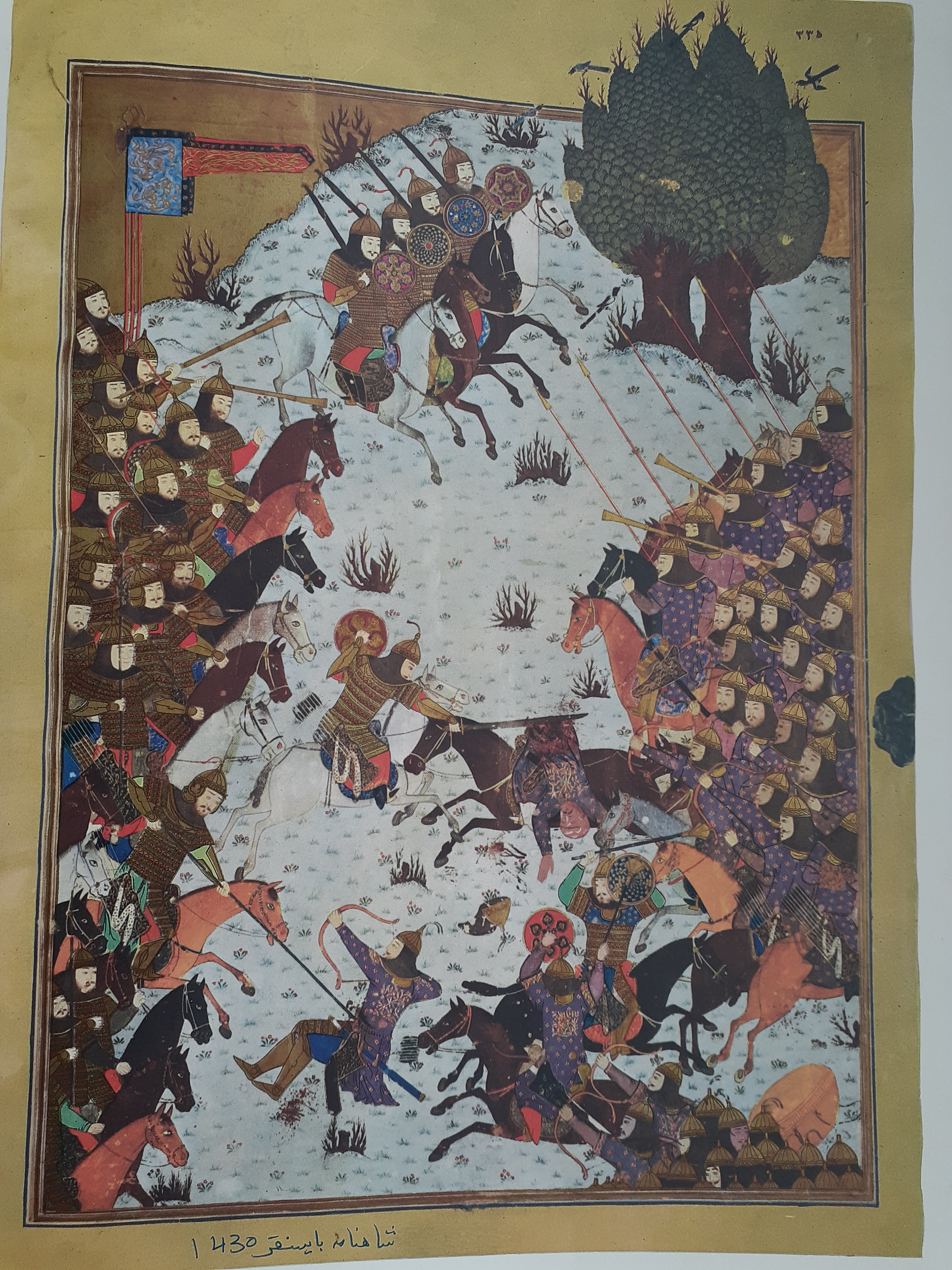
A battle between Kai Khosrow and Afrasiab, folio from Baysonghori Shahnameh, which is part of the UNESCO's Memory of the World Register. Herat, 1426–1430. Golestan Palace Library

Jamshid Giunashvili remarks on the connection of Georgian culture with that of Shahnameh:

The names of many Šāh-nāma heroes, such as Rostom-i, Thehmine, Sam-i, or Zaal-i, are found in 11th- and 12th-century Georgian literature. They are indirect evidence for an Old Georgian translation of the Šāh-nāma that is no longer extant. ...

The Šāh-nāma was translated, not only to satisfy the literary and aesthetic needs of readers and listeners, but also to inspire the young with the spirit of heroism and Georgian patriotism. Georgian ideology, customs, and worldview often informed these translations because they were oriented toward Georgian poetic culture. Conversely, Georgians consider these translations works of their native literature. Georgian versions of the Šāh-nāma are quite popular, and the stories of Rostam and Sohrāb, or Bījan and Maniža became part of Georgian folklore.

Farmanfarmaian in the Journal of Persianate Studies:

Distinguished scholars of Persian such as Gvakharia and Todua are well aware that the inspiration derived from the Persian classics of the ninth to the twelfth centuries produced a 'cultural synthesis' which saw, in the earliest stages of written secular literature in Georgia, the resumption of literary contacts with Iran, "much stronger than before" (Gvakharia, 2001, p. 481). Ferdowsi's Shahnama was a never-ending source of inspiration, not only for high literature, but for folklore as well. "Almost every page of Georgian literary works and chronicles [...] contains names of Iranian heroes borrowed from the Shahnama" (ibid). Ferdowsi, together with Nezāmi, may have left the most enduring imprint on Georgian literature (...)

=== On Turkic identity ===
Despite a belief held by some, the Turanians of Shahnameh (whose sources are based on Avesta and Pahlavi texts) have no relationship with Turks. The Turanians of the Shahnameh are an Iranian people representing Iranian nomads of the Eurasian Steppes and have no relationship to the culture of the Turks. Turan, which is the Persian name for the areas of Central Asia beyond the Oxus up to the 7th century (where the story of the Shahnameh ends), was generally an Iranian-speaking land.

According to Richard Frye, "The extent of influence of the Iranian epic is shown by the Turks who accepted it as their own ancient history as well as that of Iran... The Turks were so much influenced by this cycle of stories that in the eleventh century AD we find the Qarakhanid dynasty in Central Asia calling itself the 'family of Afrasiyab' and so it is known in the Islamic history."

Turks, as an ethno-linguistic group, have been influenced by the Shahnameh since the advent of Seljuks. The Seljuk sultan Toghrul III is said to have recited the Shahnameh while swinging his mace in battle. According to Ibn Bibi, 1221 the Seljuk sultan of Rum Ala' al-Din Kay-kubad decorated the walls of Konya and Sivas with verses from the Shahnameh. The Turks themselves connected their origin not with Turkish tribal history but with the Turanians of Shahnameh. Specifically in India, through the Shahnameh, they felt themselves to be the last outpost tied to the civilized world by the thread of Iranianism.

== Legacy ==
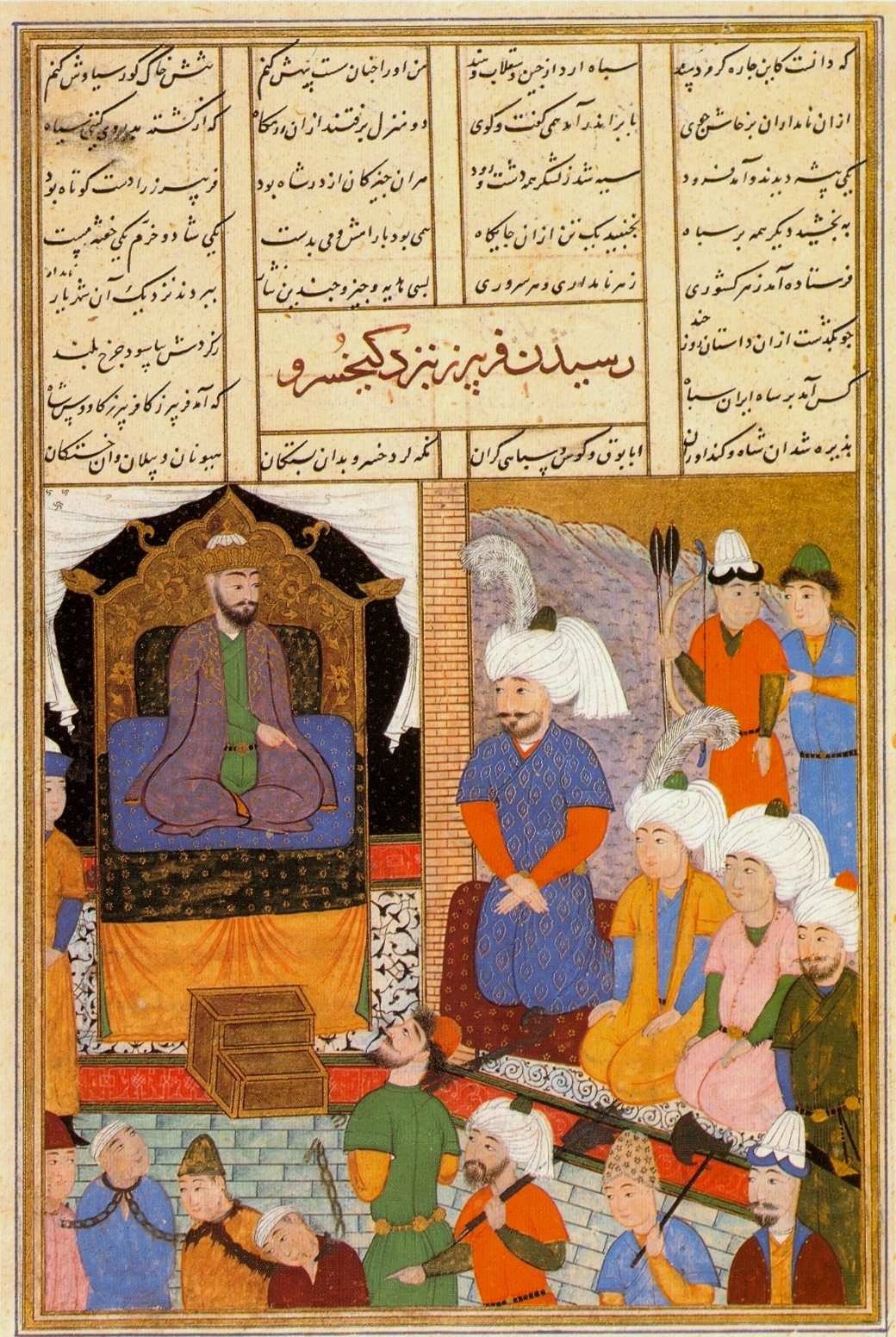
Kai Khosrow and Fariburz, folio from the Big Head Shahnameh. From Gilan, 1493–1494. British Museum

Many Persian literary figures, historians and biographers have praised Ferdowsi and the Shahnameh. The Shahnameh is considered by many to be the most important piece of work in Persian literature.

Western writers have also praised the Shahnameh and Persian literature in general. Persian literature has been considered by such thinkers as Goethe as one of the four main bodies of world literature. Goethe was inspired by Persian literature, which moved him to write his West-Eastern Divan. Goethe wrote:

When we turn our attention to a peaceful, civilized people, the Persians, we must—since it was actually their poetry that inspired this work—go back to the earliest period to be able to understand more recent times. It will always seem strange to the historians that no matter how many times a country has been conquered, subjugated and even destroyed by enemies, there is always a certain national core preserved in its character, and before you know it, there re-emerges a long-familiar native phenomenon. In this sense, it would be pleasant to learn about the most ancient Persians and quickly follow them up to the present day at an all the more free and steady pace.

=== Biographies ===
Sargozasht-Nameh or biography of important poets and writers has long been a Persian tradition. Some of the biographies of Ferdowsi are now considered apocryphal, nevertheless, this shows the important impact he had in the Persian world. Among the famous biographies are:

1. Chahar Maqaleh ("Four Articles") by Nezami 'Arudi-i Samarqandi
2. Tazkeret Al-Shu'ara ("The Biography of poets") by Dowlat Shah-i Samarqandi
3. Baharestan ("Abode of Spring") by Jami
4. Lubab ul-Albab by Mohammad 'Awfi
5. Natayej al-Afkar by Mowlana Muhammad Qudrat Allah
6. Arafat Al-'Ashighin by Ohadi Balyani

=== Poets ===
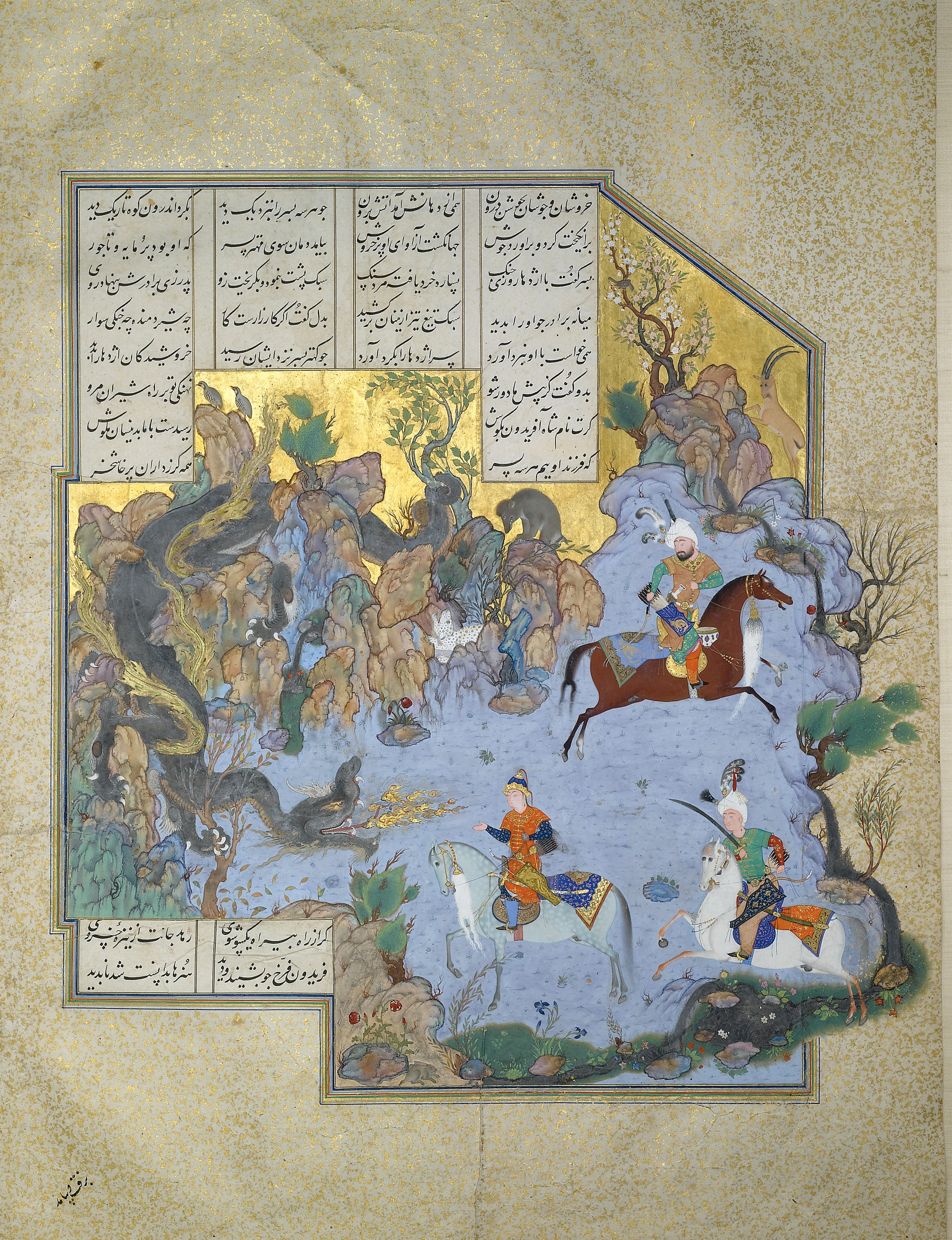
Fereydun Tests His Sons, miniature by Aqa Mirak from the Shahnameh of Shah Tahmasp. Aga Khan Museum

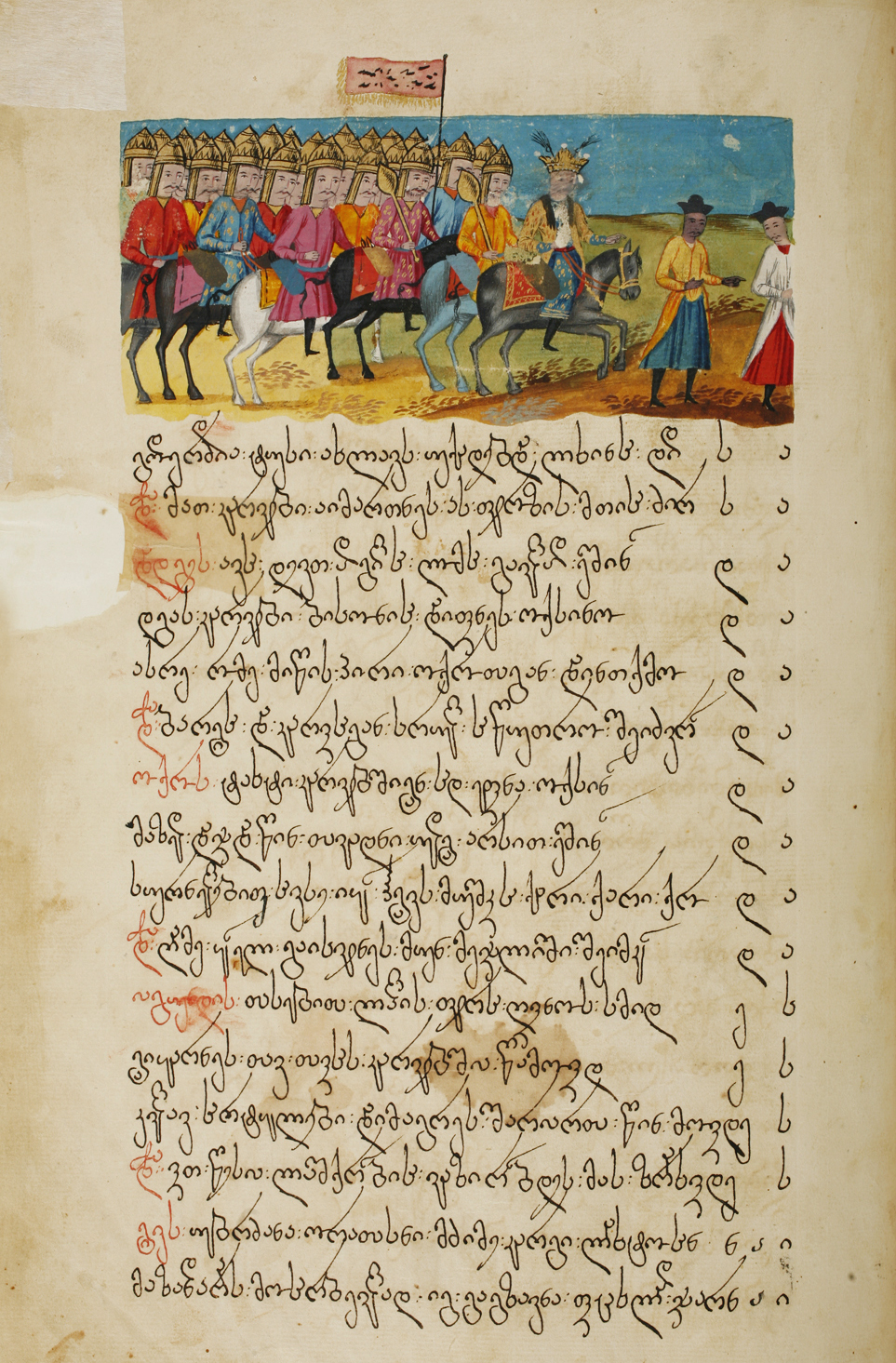
Page from the manuscript of Rostomiani, Georgian adaptation of Shahnameh

Famous poets of Persia and the Persian tradition have praised and eulogized Ferdowsi. Many of them were heavily influenced by his writing and used his genre and stories to develop their own Persian epics, stories and poems:

- Anvari remarked about the eloquence of the Shahnameh, "He was not just a Teacher and we his students. He was like a God and we are his slaves".
- Asadi Tusi was born in the same city as Ferdowsi. His Garshaspnama was inspired by the Shahnameh as he attests in the introduction. He praises Ferdowsi in the introduction and considers Ferdowsi the greatest poet of his time.
- Masud Sa'ad Salman showed the influence of the Shahnameh only 80 years after its composition by reciting its poems in the Ghaznavid court of India.
- Othman Mokhtari, another poet at the Ghaznavid court of India, remarked, "Alive is Rustam through the epic of Ferdowsi, else there would not be a trace of him in this World".
- Sanai believed that the foundation of poetry was really established by Ferdowsi.
- Nizami Ganjavi was influenced greatly by Ferdowsi and three of his five "treasures" had to do with pre-Islamic Persia. His Khosro-o-Shirin, Haft Peykar and Eskandar-nameh used the Shahnameh as a major source. Nizami remarks that Ferdowsi is "the wise sage of Tus" who beautified and decorated words like a new bride.
- Khaqani, the court poet of the Shirvanshah, wrote of Ferdowsi:
  The candle of the wise in this darkness of sorrow,
  The pure words of Ferdowsi of the Tusi are such,
  His pure sense is an angelic birth,
  Angelic born is anyone who's like Ferdowsi.
- Attar wrote about the poetry of Ferdowsi: "Open eyes and through the sweet poetry see the heavenly eden of Ferdowsi."
- In a famous poem, Sa'adi wrote:
  How sweetly has conveyed the pure-natured Ferdowsi,
  May blessing be upon his pure resting place,
  Do not harass the ant that's dragging a seed,
  because it has life and sweet life is dear.
- In the Baharestan, Jami wrote, "He came from Tus and his excellence, renown and perfection are well known. Yes, what need is there of the panegyrics of others to that man who has composed verses as those of the Shah-nameh?"

Many other poets, e.g., Hafez, Rumi and other mystical poets, have used the imagery of Shahnameh heroes in their poetry.

=== Persian historiography ===
The Shahnameh's impact on Persian historiography was immediate, and some historians decorated their books with the verses of Shahnameh. Below is sample of ten important historians who have praised the Shahnameh and Ferdowsi:

1. The unknown writer of the Tarikh Sistan ("History of Sistan") written around 1053
2. The unknown writer of Majmal al-Tawarikh wa Al-Qasas (c. 1126)
3. Mohammad Ali Ravandi, the writer of the Rahat al-Sodur wa Ayat al-Sorur (c. 1206)
4. Ibn Bibi, the writer of the history book, Al-Awamir al-'Alaiyah, written during the era of 'Ala ad-din KayGhobad
5. Ibn Esfandyar, the writer of the Tarikh-e Tabarestan
6. Muhammad Juwayni, the early historian of the Mongol era in the Tarikh-e Jahan Gushay (Ilkhanid era)
7. Hamdollah Mostowfi Qazwini also paid much attention to the Shahnameh and wrote the Zafarnamah based on the same style in the Ilkhanid era
8. Hafez-e Abru (1430) in the Majma' al-Tawarikh
9. Khwand Mir in the Habab al-Siyar (c. 1523) praised Ferdowsi and gave an extensive biography on Ferdowsi
10. The Arab historian Ibn Athir remarks in his book, Al-Kamil, that, "If we name it the Quran of 'Ajam [i.e., Persians], we have not said something in vain. If a poet writes poetry and the poems have many verses, or if someone writes many compositions, it will always be the case that some of their writings might not be excellent. But in the case of the Shahnameh, despite having more than 40 thousand couplets, all its verses are excellent."

=== Alexander legends ===
The Shahnameh contains the first Persian legend of Alexander the Great in the tradition of the Alexander Romance. Three sections of the Shahnameh are dedicated to Alexander, running over 2,500 verses in total, and Alexander's life is the work's turning point between mythic and historical rulers of Persia. It also represents a turning point of Persian-language representations of Alexander, from negative in pre-Islamic Zoroastrian writings to positive. After the Shahnameh introduced the Alexander Romance tradition into Persian, the genre would become popular and numerous Alexander legends would be composed in the language, with the most significant works owing much to the Shahnameh. These include the anonymous Iskandarnameh, the Iskandarnameh of Nizami, the Ayina-i Iskandari of Amir Khusrau, and others.

== Illustrated copies ==
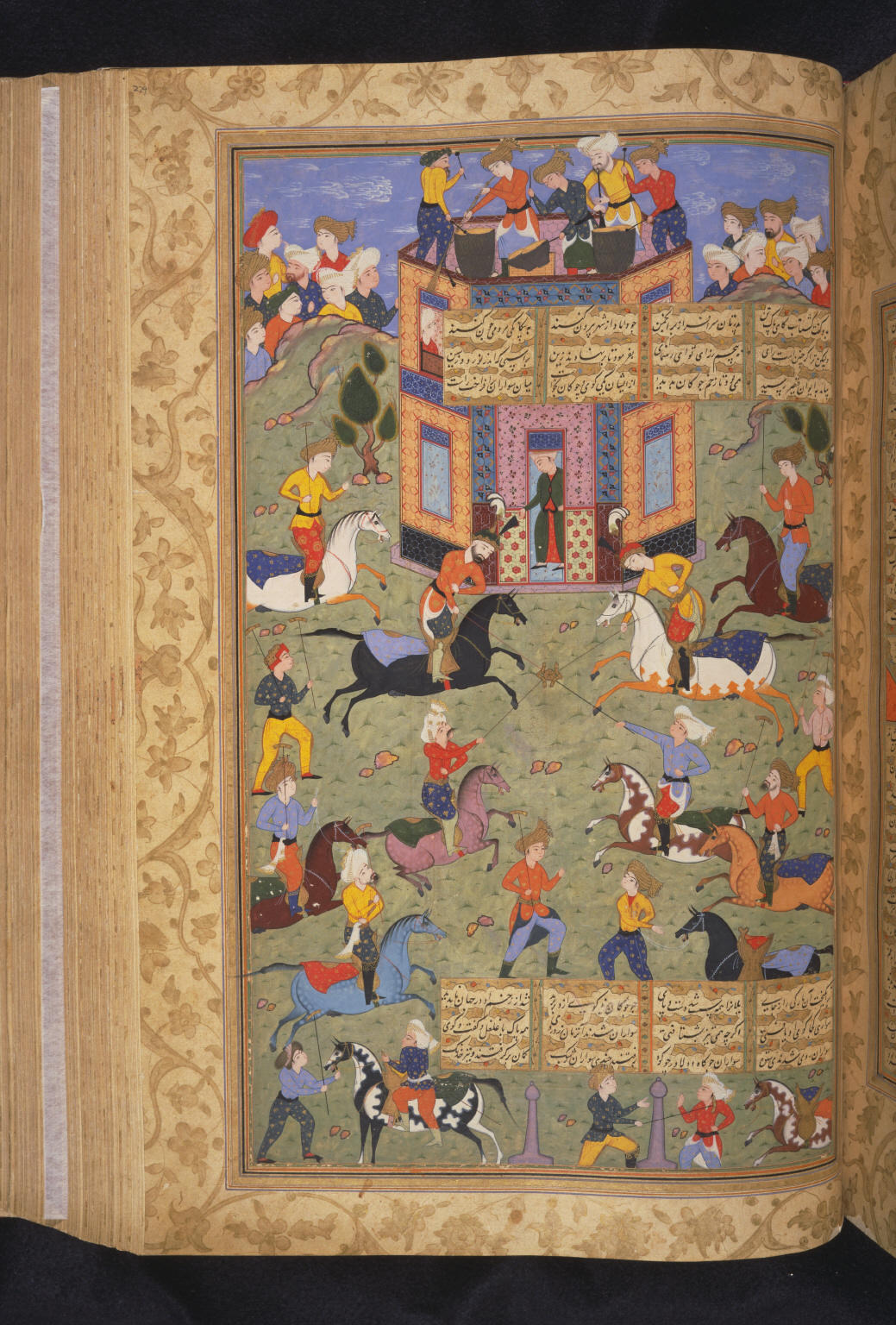
Gushtasp Displays His Prowess at Polo Before the Qaisar of Rum, folio from the Peck Shahnama. Shiraz, 1589–1590. Princeton University Library

Illustrated copies of the work are among the most sumptuous examples of Persian miniature painting. Several copies remain intact, although two of the most famous, the Houghton Shahnameh and the Great Mongol Shahnameh, were broken up for sheets to be sold separately in the 20th century. A single sheet from the former was sold for £904,000 in 2006. The Baysonghori Shahnameh, an illuminated manuscript of the work made in 1430 for Prince Baysunghur, is preserved intact at Golestan Palace in Iran. In 2007 it was inscribed in UNESCO's Memory of the World International Register which lists documentary heritage of global importance.

The Mongol rulers in Iran revived and spurred the patronage of the Shahnameh in its manuscript form. The "Great Mongol" or Demotte Shahnameh, produced during the reign of the Ilkhanid sultan Abu Sa'id, is one of the most illustrative and important copies of the Shahnameh.

The Timurids continued the tradition of manuscript production. For them, it was considered proper for the members of the family to have personal copies of the epic poem. Consequently, three of Timur's grandsons—Baysunghur, Ibrahim Sultan, and Moḥammad Juki—each commissioned such a volume. Among these, the Baysunghur Shahnameh is one of the most voluminous and artistic Shahnameh manuscripts.

The production of illustrated Shahnameh manuscripts in the 15th century remained vigorous under the Qara Qoyunlu (1380–1468) and Aq Qoyunlu (1378–1508) Turkman dynasties. Many of the extant illustrated copies, with more than seventy or more paintings, are attributable to Tabriz, Shiraz, and Baghdad beginning in about the 1450s–60s and continuing to the end of the century.

A resurgence of Shahnameh manuscript production occurred in the Safavid era. Shah Ismail I used the epic for propaganda purposes: as a gesture of Persian patriotism, as a celebration of renewed Persian rule, and as a reassertion of Persian royal authority. The Safavids commissioned elaborate copies of the Shahnameh to support their legitimacy. Among the high points of Shahnameh illustrations was the series of 250 miniatures commissioned by Shah Ismail for his son's Shahnameh of Shah Tahmasp. Two similar cycles of illustration of the mid-17th century, the Shahnameh of Rashida and the Windsor Shahnameh, come from the last great period of the Persian miniature.

In honour of the Shahnameh's millennial anniversary, in 2010 the Fitzwilliam Museum in Cambridge hosted a major exhibition, called "Epic of the Persian Kings: The Art of Ferdowsi's Shahnameh", which ran from September 2010 to January 2011. The Arthur M. Sackler Gallery of the Smithsonian Institution in Washington, DC also hosted an exhibition of folios from the 14th through the 16th centuries, called "Shahnama: 1000 Years of the Persian Book of Kings", from October 2010 to April 2011.

In 2013 Hamid Rahmanian illustrated a new English translation of the Shahnameh (translated by Ahmad Sadri) creating new imagery from old manuscripts.

== Modern editions ==
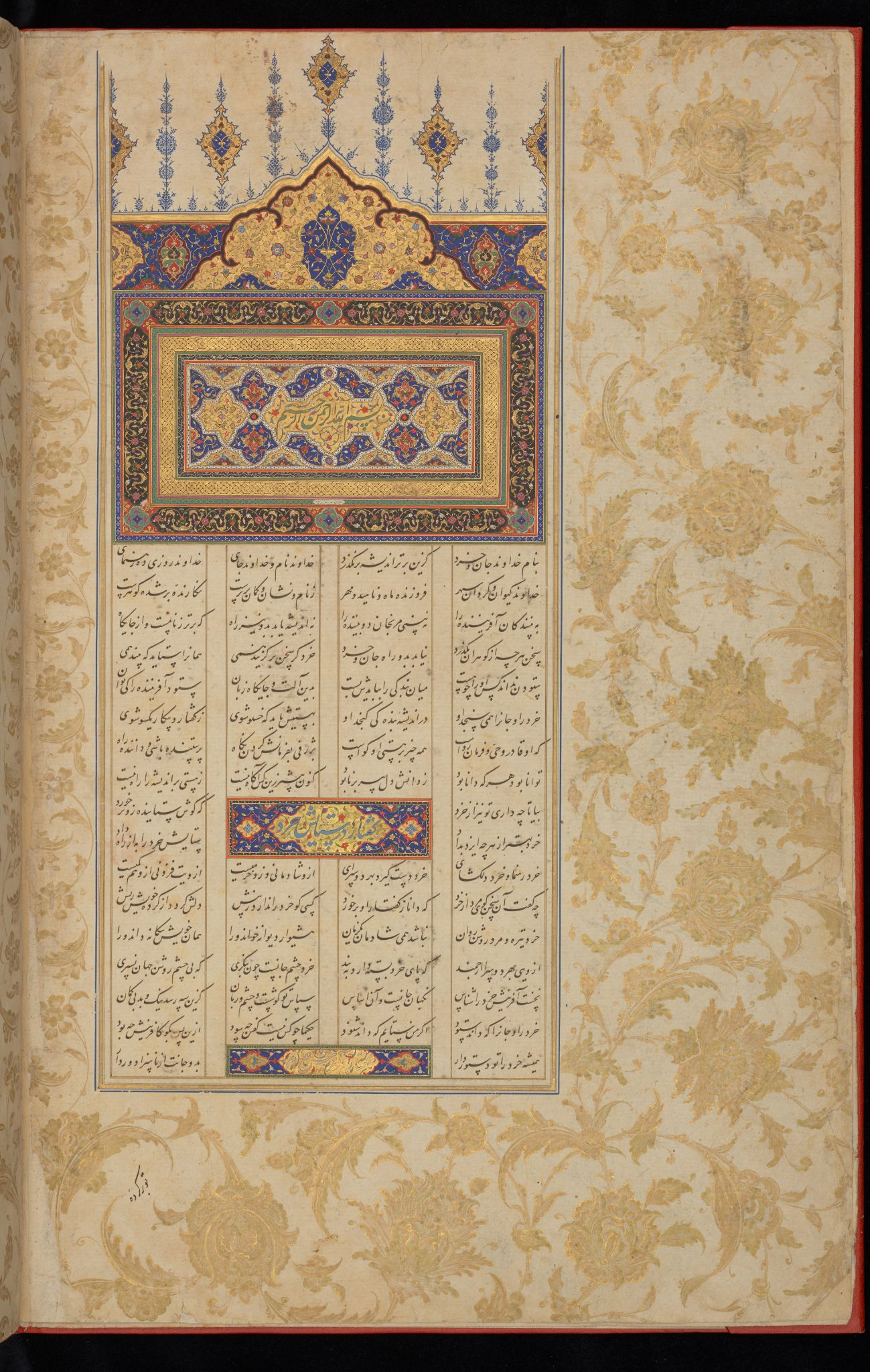
Illuminated frontispiece (sarlawh) from the Shahnameh of Shah Abbas, made by Zayn al-‛Abidin Tabrizi. Qazvin, c. 1590–1600. Chester Beatty Library

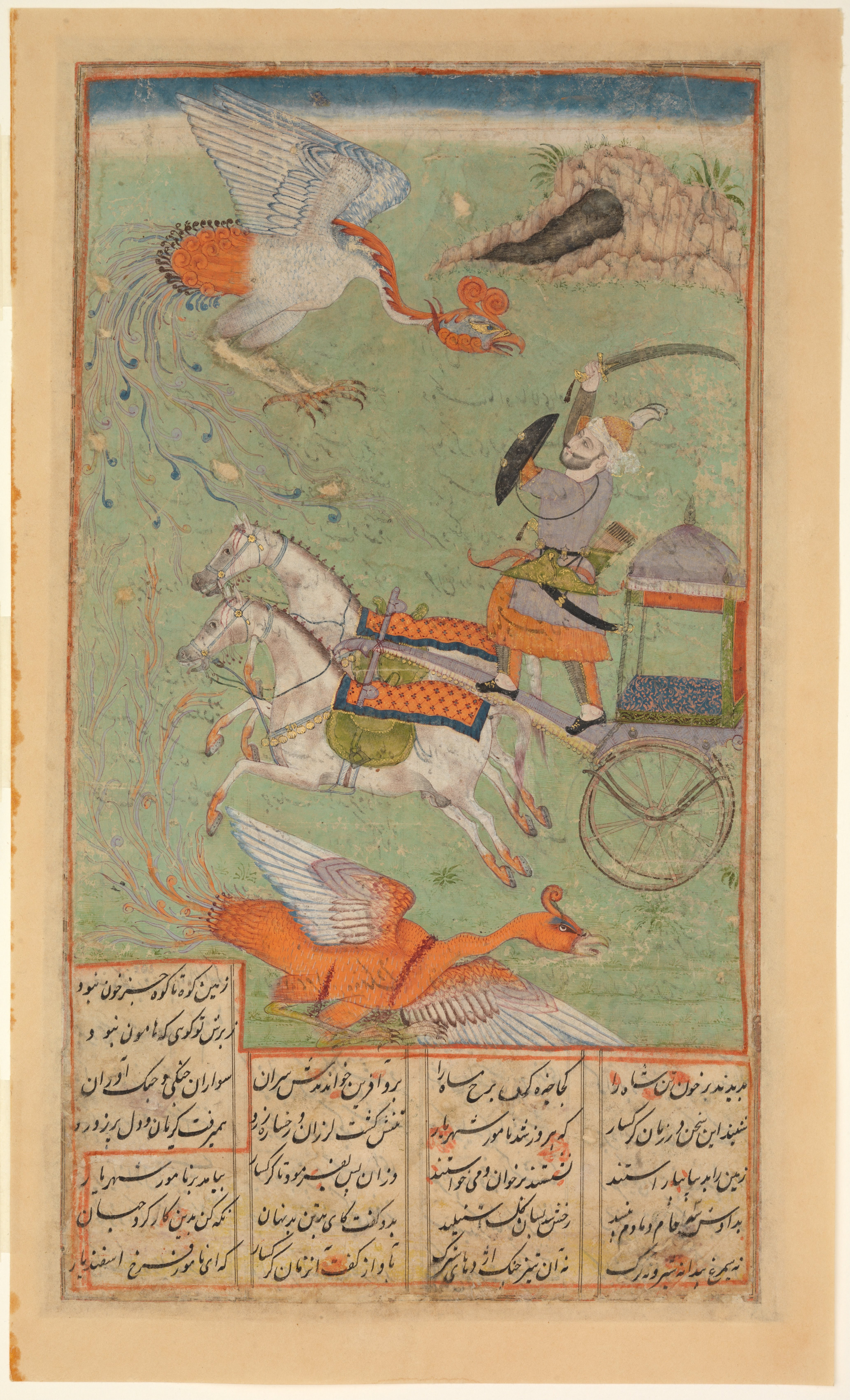
Esfandiyar's Fifth Trial – He Slays the Simurgh, folio from the Shahnameh in the Kangra style. Kangra, 1695. Chester Beatty Library

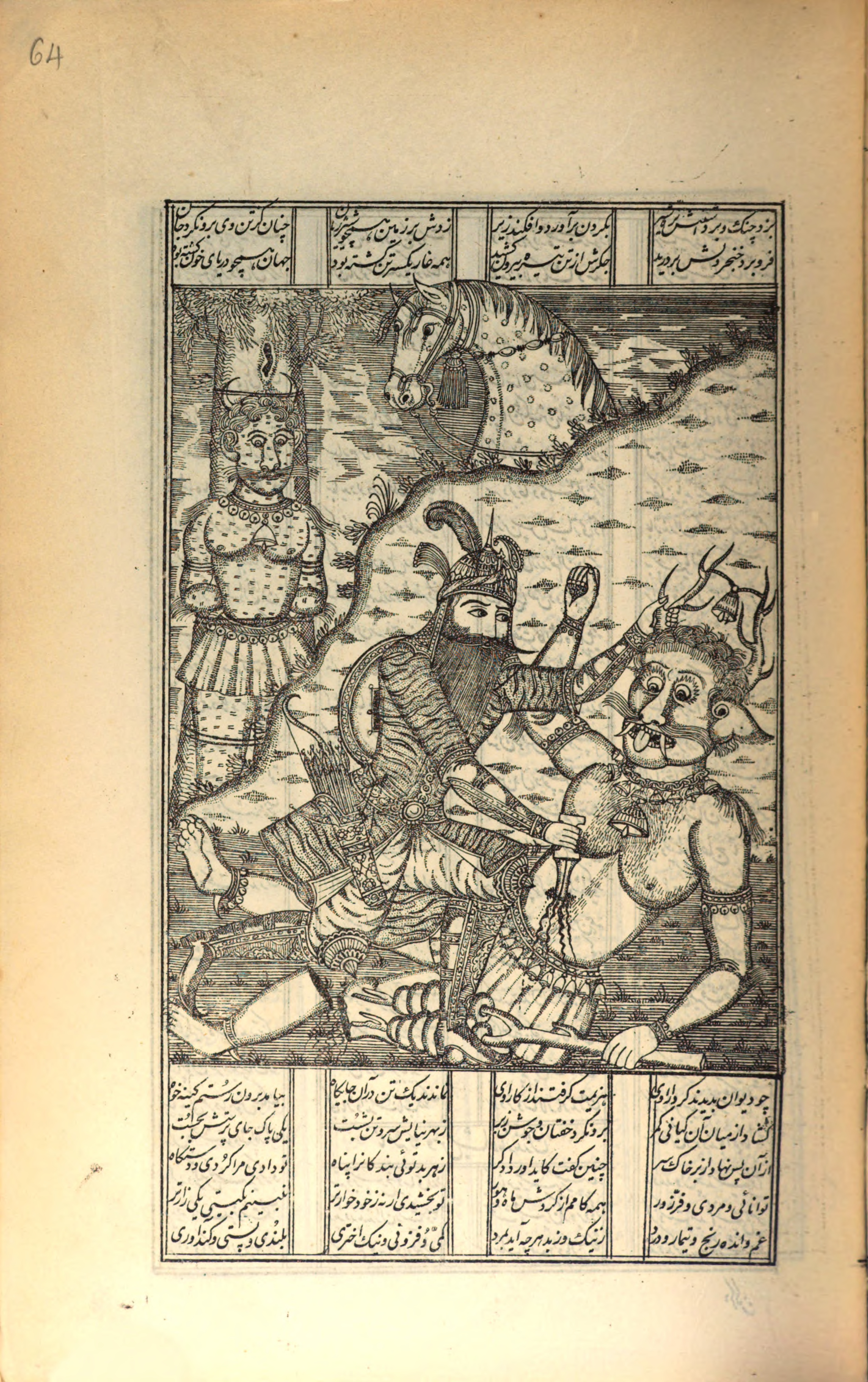
Rostam Kills the White Div, illustration from the Shahnameh-ye Kajuri, first Iranian lithographed Shahnameh. Tehran, 1851–53. Bavarian State Library

=== Scholarly editions ===
Scholarly editions have been prepared of the Shahnameh. In 1808 Mathew Lumsden (1777–1835) undertook the work of an edition of the poem. The first of eight planned volumes was published in Kolkata in 1811. But Lumsden didn't finish any further volumes. In 1829 Turner Macan published the first complete edition of the poem. It was based on a comparison of 17 manuscript copies.

Between 1838 and 1878, an edition appeared by French scholar Julius von Mohl, which was based on a comparison of 30 manuscripts. After Mohl's death in 1876, the last of its seven volumes was completed by Charles Barbier de Meynard, Mohl's successor to the chair of Persian of the College de France.

Both editions lacked critical apparatuses and were based on secondary manuscripts dated after the 15th century, much later than the original work. Between 1877 and 1884, the German scholar Johann August Vullers prepared a synthesized text of the Macan and Mohl editions under the title Firdusii liber regum, but only three of its expected nine volumes were published. The Vullers edition was later completed in Tehran by the Iranian scholars S. Nafisi, Iqbal, and M. Minowi for the millennial jubilee of Ferdowsi, held between 1934 and 1936.

The first modern critical edition of the Shahnameh was prepared by a Russian team led by E. E. Bertels, using the oldest known manuscripts at the time, dating from the 13th and 14th centuries, with heavy reliance on the 1276 manuscript from the British Museum and the 1333 Leningrad manuscript, the latter of which has now been considered a secondary manuscript. In addition, two other manuscripts used in this edition have been so demoted. It was published in Moscow by the Institute of Oriental Studies of the Academy of Sciences of the USSR in nine volumes between 1960 and 1971.

For many years, the Moscow edition was the standard text. In 1977, an early 1217 manuscript was rediscovered in Florence. The 1217 Florence manuscript is one of the earliest known copies of the Shahnameh, predating the Mongol invasion and the following destruction of important libraries and manuscript collections. Using it as the chief text, Djalal Khaleghi-Motlagh began the preparation of a new critical edition in 1990. The number of manuscripts that were consulted during the preparation of the Khaleghi-Motlagh edition goes beyond anything attempted by the Moscow team. The critical apparatus is the extensive number of variants for many parts of the poem that were recorded. The last volume was published in 2008, bringing the eight-volume enterprise to completion. According to Dick Davis, professor of Persian at Ohio State University, it is "by far the best edition of the Shahnameh available, and it is surely likely to remain such for a very long time".

=== Arabic translation ===
The only known Arabic translation of the Shahnameh was done in c. 1220 by al-Fath bin Ali al-Bundari, a Persian scholar from Isfahan and at the request of the Ayyubid ruler of Damascus Al-Mu'azzam Isa. The translation is unrhyming (nathr) and was largely forgotten until it was republished in full in 1932 in Egypt, by historian Abdelwahhab Azzam. This modern edition was based on incomplete and largely imprecise fragmented copies found in Cambridge, Paris, Astana, Cairo and Berlin. The latter had the most complete, least inaccurate and well-preserved Arabic version of the original translation by al-Bundari.

=== English translations ===
There have been several English translations, almost all abridged. James Atkinson of the East India Company's medical service undertook a translation into English in his 1832 publication for the Oriental Translation Fund of Great Britain and Ireland, now part of the Royal Asiatic Society. Between 1905 and 1925, the brothers Arthur and Edmond Warner published a translation of the complete work in nine volumes, now out of print. There are also modern abridged translations of the Shahnameh: Reuben Levy's 1967 prose version (later revised by Amin Banani), and another by Dick Davis in a mixture of poetry and prose which appeared in 2006. Also, a new English translation of the book in prose by Ahmad Sadri was published in 2013.

=== Other languages ===
There are various translations of the Shahnameh into French and German. An Italian translation was published in eight volumes by Italo Pizzi with the title Il libro dei re in 1886–1888 (later reissued in two volumes with a compendium in 1915).

Dastur Faramroz Kutar and his brother Ervad Mahiyar Kutar translated the Shahnameh into Gujarati verse and prose and published 10 volumes between 1914 and 1918.

A Spanish translation was published in two volumes by the Islamic Research Institute of the Tehran Branch of McGill University.

== In popular culture ==
=== Shahnameh-khani ===
Shahnameh-khani, (Note: Modern Iranian Persian: شاهنامه‌خوانی, romanized: Šâhnâme-xâni, pronounced [ʃɒːɦ.nɒː.me.xɒː.ˈniː].) also romanized Shahnama-khwani (Note: Classical Persian: شاهنامه‌خوانی, romanized: Šāhnāma-xwānī, reconstructed pronunciation: [ʃaːh.naː.ma.xʷaː.ˈniː].) (lit. 'recitation of the Shahnameh'), is a traditional art of publicly reciting the Shahnameh. Reciters of the Shahnameh are known as Shahnameh-khans (Note: Modern Iranian Persian singular: شاهنامه‌خوان, romanized: Šâhnâme-xân, pronounced [ʃɒːɦ.nɒː.me.ˈxɒːn].) or Shahnama-khwans. (Note: Classical Persian singular: شاهنامه‌خوان, romanized: Šāhnāma-xwān, reconstructed pronunciation: [ʃaːh.naː.ma.ˈxʷaːn].) Shahnameh-khani has been practiced for centuries in the cities and villages of Iran.

=== Adaptations ===
The Soviet Armenian composer Sergey Balasanian and Tajik composer Sharif Bobokalonov wrote the opera Kova the Blacksmith (Кузнец Кова) based on the story of Zahhak and Kaveh from the Shahnameh. It premiered in 1940 in concert with a Russian libretto, and in 1941 on stage with a Tajik-language libretto by Abulkasim Lahuti.

The Shahnameh has also been adapted to many films and animations:

- Shirin Farhad (1931), Indian Hindi-language feature film based on the story of Khosrow and Shirin, directed by J.J. Madan and starring Jehanara Kajjan and Master Nissar. It was the second Indian sound film after Alam Ara (also released in the same year).
- Shirin Farhad (1956), Indian romantic adventure drama film based on the story of Khosrow and Shirin, directed by Aspi Irani and starring Madhubala and Pradeep Kumar.
- Rustom Sohrab (1963), Indian adventure drama film based on the story of Rostam and Sohrab, directed by Vishram Bedekar and starring Prithviraj Kapoor and Premnath.
- In 1971–1976, Tajikfilm produced a trilogy comprising Skazanie o Rustame, Rustam i Sukhrab and Skazanie o Siyavushe.
- Zal & Simorgh (1977), Persian short animation directed by Ali Akbar Sadeghi, narrates the story of Zāl from birth until returning to the human society.
- Kova the Blacksmith (1987), a short Russian-language cutout animation made at Tajikfilm by director Munavar Mansurhojaev, based on the story of Zahhak and Kaveh.
- Chehel Sarbaz (2007), Persian TV series directed by Mohammad Nourizad, concurrently tells the story of Rostam and Esfandiar, biography of Ferdowsi, and a few other historical events.
- Shirin Farhad Ki Toh Nikal Padi (2012), Indian Hindi-language romantic comedy film about the love affair of a middle-aged Parsi couple loosely based on the story of Khosrow and Shirin, directed by Bela Segal and starring Farah Khan and Boman Irani.
- The Last Fiction (2017), an acclaimed animated film is an adaptation of the story of Zahhak.

== See also ==
- List of Shahnameh characters
- List of places in the Shahnameh
- List of women in the Shahnameh
- Rostam and Esfandiyar
- Rostam's Seven Labours
- Zal and Rudaba
- Shahnameh-khani, a performing art based on the Shahnameh
- Rostam and Sohrab, an opera by Loris Tjeknavorian
- Sohrab and Rustum, an 1853 poem by Matthew Arnold
- Vis and Rāmin, an epic poem similar to the Shahnameh
- Mir Jalaleddin Kazzazi
- Shahrokh Meskoob

== Sources ==
- Dabashi, Hamid (1993). Parviz Sayyad's Theater of Diaspora. Mazda Publishers. ISBN 978-0-939214-94-5.
- Dabashi, Hamid (2007). Iran: A People Interrupted. New Press. ISBN 978-1-59558-333-8.
- Djalili, Mohammad-Reza (2005). Géopolitique de l'Iran (in French). Editions Complexe. ISBN 978-2-8048-0040-6.
- Farmanfarmaian, Fatema Soudavar (2009). Arjomand, Saïd Amir (ed.). "Georgia and Iran: Three Millennia of Cultural Relations An Overview". Journal of Persianate Studies. 2 (1). BRILL: 1–43. doi:10.1163/187471609X445464.
- Jahandideh, Mitra; Khaefi, Shahab (2013). "The Most Important Performing Arts Arisen from Shahnameh of Ferdowsi: Shahnameh-khani and Naqqali of Shahnameh". Journal of the Indiana Academy of the Social Sciences. 16 (2).
- Karimi, Pamela (2022). Alternative Iran: Contemporary Art and Critical Spatial Practice. Stanford University Press. ISBN 978-1-5036-3181-6.
- Yamamoto, Kumiko (2017). "The Barzunama as told by storytellers". Shahnama Studies. BRILL. ISBN 978-90-04-35625-2.
