= List of women in the Shahnameh =

There are many queens, princesses, heroines and witches in Ferdowsi's Shahnameh (Book of Kings), from Iran, Turan, the Roman Empire, China, India etc.

== List of women in the Shahnameh ==
- Arezo, daughter of Mahyar
- Arezo, wife of Salm
- Azadeh, the lover of Bahram V Gor
- Azarmidokht, Queen of Queens of Iran
- Arnavāz, wife of Zahak and later of Freydon
- Spanoy, a Turanian princess
- Banou of Gazor
- Banou of Gordoye
- Banou of Mahbod
- Boran, Queen of Queens of Iran
- Beh-Afarid, daughter of Kay Vishtasp
- Tahmina, mother of Sohrab and wife of Rustam
- Jarireh, the first wife of Siyavash
- Jamag, sister of Jamshid
- Rudaba, wife of Zal and the mother of Rustam
- Spinvad, an Indian princess and lover of Bahram V Gor
- Sudabeh, wife of Kay Kavus
- Sahi, wife of Iraj
- Sindukht, grandmother of Rustam
- Shahrnāz, daughter of Jamshid, wife of Zahak and Freydon
- Faranak, mother of Freydon
- Farangis, wife of Siyavash and mother of Kay Khosrow
- Katāyoun, a Roman princess, wife of Kay Visthasp and step-mother of Esfandiyar
- Gordafarid, a young Iranian princess who fought Sohrab
- Gordiye, a princess and warrior of House of Mehran, sister of Bahram Chobin, wife of Vistahm and eventually wife of Khosrow II Parviz
- Gol Shahr, wife of Piran Viseh
- Mah Afarid, a woman who slept with Iraj, mother of Manuchihr
- Manizheh, a Turanian princess, the lover of Bijan
- Mehrnaz, sister of Kay Kavus
- Homay, daughter of Kay Vishtasp
- Kay Homay, Queen of Queens of Iran
