= Sadan =

Sadan may refer to:

- Sədan, a village and municipality in Azerbaijan
- Sadan, Iran, a village in Golestan Province, Iran
- Sadan, South Khorasan, a village in South Khorasan Province, Iran
- Sadan peoples, Indo-Aryan ethnic groups in India
  - Sadanic languages, languages of these people
  - Nagpuria people or Sadan, ethnic group of Jharkhand, India
    - Sadani or Sadri language, Indo-Aryan language spoken by the ethnic group

== See also ==
- Sadri (disambiguation)
- Sadr (disambiguation)
