= List of places in the Shahnameh =

Here is the list of places represented/mentioned in the Shahnameh, a Persian epic poem by Ferdowsi:

== Irān and Turān ==
- Amol
- Kābol
- Zabolestān
- Balkh
- Estakhr
- Madāyen
- Tamishah
- Sistān
- Nimruz
- Herāt
- Bost
- Kunduz
- Ghazni
- Bāmyān
- Kandahār
- Merv
- Zibad
- Gharchagān
- Tāleqān
- Fāryāb
- Bokhārā
- Kashmir
- Andarāb
- Panjhir
- Termez
- Khatlan
- Badakhshān
- Gowzgānān
- Azarābādgān
- Pārs
- Ahvāz
- Rey
- Damghan
- Moolian
- Soghd
- Māy
- Margh
- Ermān
- Alānān
- Ghannoj
- Baghdad
- Baytolmoghaddas/Dez Hookht Kang
- Tātār
- Toor
- Danbar/Danbal
- Dahestān
- Roodābad
- Sāri
- Sebenjab/Sepijab
- Sagsār
- Shir
- Shirkhān
- Terāz
- Toos
- Kermān
- Gorzbān
- Gorgān
- Goorāb/Goorābad/Goorābe
- Māvaronnahr
- Ardabil
- Esfahān
- Khorāsān
- Khazar
- Samarghand
- Gilān
- Makrān
- Neshāboor
- Gorganj
- Jahrom
- Halab
- Iraq
- Daylam
- Ram Ardashir
- Gundishapur
- Samangan (not to be confused with today Samangan Province)
- Siavashgerd
- Khotan

=== Plains ===
- Dasht-e Sovārān-e Neyze-gozār
- Dasht-e Ghahtān
- Dasht-e Gordān
- Dasht-e Yalān

=== Mounts ===
- Damavand
- Alborzkouh
- Hendoukesh (also referred to as Hendoukouh)
- Sepidkouh
- Kooh-e Sepand
- Dābe kooh/Rābeh kooh

=== Rivers ===
- Jayhoon (also referred to as Amoodarya)
- Helmand
- Kāse rood
- Arvandrood
- Darya-ye Chin
- Darya-ye Bikand
- Darya-ye Gilan
- Roode Rey
- Draya-ye Send

== Other ==
- Mazandaran (not to be confused with today Mazandaran province)
- Hamavaran (possibly Himyarite Kingdom)
- Mesr
- Barbar
- Barbaristan
- Rûm
- Yemen
- Chin
- Hend
- Andalos
- Babel
- Bahrain
- Makke
- Jeddah
- Nile
- Gorgsārān
- Shām

== See also ==
- List of Shahnameh characters
- Persian literature
- Persian mythology
