= Sadr =

Sadr or SADR may refer to:

== Places ==
- Sadr City, a neighborhood in Baghdad, Iraq
- Sadr, Iran, a village in East Azerbaijan Province, Iran
- Sahrawi Arab Democratic Republic (SADR), is a partially recognized country in North Africa.

== Other uses ==
- Sadr (name), a family name originating in Lebanon
- Sadr (surname), list of people with the surname
- Sadr (title), a title primarily used in the Iranian world to designate an exceptional person, such as a scholar
- Source-address dependent routing or source-specific routing
- Gamma Cygni or Sadr, a star
- The Urdu word for president, used to refer to the President of Pakistan

== See also ==
- Sadar (disambiguation)
- Sadri (disambiguation)
- Sadan (disambiguation)
