= Ahmad Sadri =

Ahmad Sadri is an Iranian-American sociologist, author, and translator. He is the James P. Gorter Professor of Islamic World Studies and Professor of Sociology and Anthropology at Lake Forest College. He is the twin brother and collaborator of Mahmoud Sadri.

== Biography ==
Ahmad Sadri (c. 1954) was born in Iran. He received a Bachelor of Arts and Master of Arts in Sociology from Tehran University and a MS and PhD from the New School for Social Research in New York. He is an active member of the reform movement in Iran.

In August 2014, Sadri was arrested in Iran for propaganda against the state and collaboration with enemies of the state, which hold a one and five year prison sentence, respectively. He was released on bail his first night at Evin Prison after hours of interrogation but was grounded in Iran for 40 days before his passport was returned. During this time, he continued to be interrogated by the Ministry of Justice. He returned to the United States and resumed his teaching duties at Lake Forest College in December.

== Career ==
Sadri joined the Sociology and Anthropology department at Lake Forest College in 1998 and was named the James P. Gorter Professor of Islamic World Studies in 2007. He has written articles in English, Persian, and Arabic for scholarly journals and editorials in the popular press, such as "Daily Star" of Lebanon. In the United States, he has appeared many times in public forums and in the media. He was on an advisory board member of the National Iranian American Council (NIAC). He resigned from NIAC on 01/07/2022.

== Books ==
- Max Weber's Sociology of Intellectuals, New York: Oxford University Press, 1992. (English)
- Apocalypse Tomorrow and other Essays: Investigations in Sociologies of Religion and Politics, Translated to Persian by Amirhossein Teymoori, Kavir Press, Tehran, March, 2007.
- The Necessity of Reviving The Concept of Civilization in Social Sciences, Tehran: Hermes and Center for the Dialogue of Civilizations, 2001. (Persian).

== Books translated ==
- Saddam City by Mahmoud Saeed, London, Saqi Books, 2004. Translated from Arabic.
- Reason, Freedom and Democracy in Islam: Essays by Abdolkarim Soroush, New York, Oxford University Press 2000, Co-translated from Persian with Mahmoud Sadri.
- Shahnameh: The Epic of the Persian Kings by Abolqasem Ferdowsi, Quantuck Lane Press, 2013. Translated from Persian.
