= Sadr, Iran =

Sadr صدر
- Village
- Location within Iran
- Coordinates: 38°53′10″N 44°19′26″E
- Country: Iran
- Province: West Azerbaijan
- County: Chaldoran
- Bakhsh: Central
- Rural District: Chaldoran-e Jonubi

Population (2006)
  - Total: 131
- Time zone: UTC+3:30 (IRST)
  - Summer (DST): UTC+4:30 (IRDT)

Sadr (Persian: صدر, also romanized as Şadr) is a village in Chaldoran-e Jonubi Rural District, in the Central District of Chaldoran County, West Azerbaijan Province, Iran. At the 2006 census its population was 131, in 24 families.
