= Sodor =

Sodor may refer to:

- Island of Sodor, the setting of The Railway Series and Thomas & Friends
- Diocese of Sodor and Man of the Church of England
  - Bishop of Sodor and Man
- Diocese of the Isles, pre-Reformation; also known as Diocese of Sodor
  - Bishop of the Isles
- Kingdom of the Isles, a medieval kingdom
