= Mohammad Sadri =

Iranian film director (born 1963)

- محمد صدري
- Born: September 8, 1963 (age 62); Tehran, Iran

Mohammad Sadri (Persian: محمد صدري; September 8, 1963) is an Iranian film director, writer, film producer and cinematographer.

== Biography ==
Sadri was born in Tehran, Iran. He graduated in cinema from the Art University of Tehran. He has travelled extensively, particularly in war zones such as Afghanistan, Cuba, Ghana, Bosnia Herzegovina, Iraq and Sudan. He took part in the war between Iran and Iraq as a cinematographer with a filming group named "Revaiat e Fat'h" with his friend Morteza Avini.

== Films ==
- Papoosh (2008)
- Arbaeen (2007)
- Shanjar O Shaghaiegh
- Afghanestan Sarzamin Khasteh

== Books ==
- The Concept of Reality in Art And Cinema (1998)
- Filmbardari Mostanade Jangi (1995)
- Saiareh Ranj (1)
- Saiareh Ranj (2)
