= Mahmoud Sadri =

Iranian sociologist

Mahmoud Sadri is an Iranian-American sociologist. He is the twin brother of Ahmad Sadri. He graduated with his master's degree in Sociology as well as a Baccalauréat qualification from the University of Tehran in 1976 and 1974 respectively. He then earned his Ph.D. from The New School University, New York in 1988.

Mahmoud Sadri is a full professor of sociology at the Federation of North Texas Area Universities that includes Texas Woman's University, University of North Texas, and A&M University, Commerce. Before joining the Federation of North Texas Area Universities, he lectured at Northwestern University in Denton, Texas.His major interests include Sociology of Religion, Sociology of Culture, and Theoretical Sociology. His other interests include reform Islam and Interfaith Dialogue. He has a (still developing) website that contains most of his Persian and some of his English works. The address is: drmahmoudsadri.com.

Dr. Sadri regularly contributes to popular journals and newspapers in Iran, and grants interviews to radio and television programs such as BBC, Radio France, Voice of America, and Radio Australia. Also, he writes op. ed pieces for Daily Star, The Guardian, UK. The New York Times, Fort Worth Daily Telegraph, Newsweek, and Time have carried interviews, profiles, and quotations from him in the recent years.

== Books and publications ==
- Sadri, Ahmad and Mahmoud Sadri. 1998. "Intercultural Understanding: Max Weber and Leo Strauss". pps. 507-528 in Richard Altschuler (ed.). The Living Legacy of Marx, Durkheim, and Weber. New York: Gordian Knot Books.
- Good News About Modernity: Selective Saliency of Ascribed and Achieved Status in Durkheim's Division of Labour in Society: The Living Legacy of Marx, Durkheim and Weber, Volume II: Application and Analyses of Classical Theory by Mpdrn Scientists, 2000 (Contributing Author)
- Mobasher, Mohsen and Mahmoud Sadri. (eds.) 2003. Migration Dynamics: A Theoretical and Substantive Reader. Englewood Cliffs, NJ: Prentice Hall.
- Mahmoud, Sadri (2017). "Democracy in Iran: Why It Failed and How It Might Succeed". Social Forces. 96 (1): e01. doi:10.1093/sf/sox050.
- Annotated translation of Introduction to Mohammad Hossein Naini's Exhortation of the Faithful and Purification of the Nation: Modernist Islam, Oxford University Press, New York.
- Mahmoud, Sadri (200). Reason, Freedom, and Democracy in Islam: The Essential Writings of Abdolkarim Soroush. Oxford University Press. p. 256. ISBN 978-0-195-12812-3.
- Premonitions of Interfaith dialogue, Journal inter-religious Insight, 2006
- Contributor on Hojjatie Society, Islamic extremism, and Mahmoud Halabi in the Encyclopædia Iranica (2005, 2006)
- Mahmoud, Sadri (1994). "Doppelganger: Twins' Disruption of the Assumptions of Constancy and Uniqueness of Self in Everyday Life". Symbolic Interaction. 17 (2): 203–223. doi:10.1525/si.1994.17.2.203.
- Mahmoud, Sadri (2016). "Sacral defense of secularism: the political theologies of Soroush, Shabestari and Kadivar". International Journal of Politics, Culture and Society. 15 (2): 257–270.

== See also ==
- https://apps.twu.edu › profile

Mahmoud Sadri, Ph.D. - Texas Woman's University
