= Sadr (surname) =

Sadr (Persian: صدر) is a Persian surname. Notable people with the surname include:

- Ali Sadr Hasheminejad, known as Ali Sadr (born 1980), American businessman
- Behjat Sadr (1924–2009), Iranian painter
- Fazlollah Sadr, Iranian politician
- Hamid Reza Sadr (1956–2021), Iranian journalist
- Hussein Mohammed Hadi Al-Sadr (1945–2026), Iraqi Shia cleric, scholar, and writer
- Ibrahim Sadr, Afghan politician
- Javad Sadr (1912–1990), Iranian diplomat and politician
- Muhammad-Sadiq al-Sadr (1943 – 1999) Iraqi Shia cleric and jurist
- Mohsen Sadr (1871–1962), Iranian politician
- Movayyed Hoseini Sadr (born 1970), Iranian politician
- Muqtada al-Sadr (born 1974), Iraqi radical Shiite cleric
- Reza Sadr (born 1932), Iranian politician
- Shadi Sadr (born 1974), Iranian lawyer and journalist
- Shahabedin Sadr (born 1962), Iranian physician and politician
- Wafaa El-Sadr (born 1950), Egyptian American physician
