= List of Shahnameh characters =

Here is a list of characters represented in the Shahnameh, a Persian epic poem by Ferdowsi, including both heroes and villains:

- Arash
- Arjasp
- Afrasiab
- Abteen
- Arnavaz
- Armin
- Arman
- Babak
- Bārbad
- Bizhan
- Bahram
- Bahman
- Borzou
- Bijan
- Behzad
- Esfandyar
- Faramarz
- Faranak
- Farangis
- Fereydun
- Farhad
- Garshasp
- Ghaaran
- Ghobad
- Giv
- Goodarz
- Gordafarid
- Gorgin
- Garsivaz
- Giti
- Haftvad
- Hojir
- Houman
- Hushang
- Īrāj
- Iskandar
- Jamshid
- Kaveh the blacksmith
- Kai Khosrow
- Keshvad
- Keyumars
- Kai Kavoos
- Katayoun
- Kasra
- kamus
- Kianoosh
- Manuchehr
- Manijeh
- Mardas
- Mehrab Kaboli
- Mehran
- Nariman
- Nowzar
- Qaydafeh
- Rakhsh
- Roham
- Rostam
- Rostam Farrokhzād
- Rudaba
- Saam
- Salm
- Sasan
- Sekandar
- Sarv
- Shaghad
- Shahran Goraz
- Shahrasb
- Shahrnaz
- Shahzreh
- Shirin
- Simurgh
- Siamak
- Siyâvash
- Sohrab
- Sudabeh
- Tahmina
- Tahmoores
- Tur
- Viseh
- Zal
- Zahhāk
- Zarvan
- Zoo Tahmasp
- Zoroaster

== See also ==
- Iranian literature
- Persian mythology
