= Banu Goshasp =

Heroine in Iranian mythology

Bānu Goshasp (Persian: بانو گشسپ) or Goshasp Banu is an important heroine in Iranian mythology. She is the daughter of Rustam and the wife of the hero Giv. She is mentioned in several Persian epics including the Banu Goshasp Nama.

== Banu Goshasp Nama ==
There is an epic called Banu Goshasp-Nama composed of 900 verses by an unknown poet from the 11th or 12th century. It is one of the oldest epics about a Woman warrior in Persian literature. There is a manuscript of the poem at the Bibliothèque Nationale in Paris (Cat. Bibliothèque Nationale, p. 18, no. 1194). The epic describes the exploits of Banu Goshasp along with her brother Faramarz in Turan and India. In one of her heroic episodes, she battles with her father, Rustam due to not recognizing each other. Disaster is avoided in time when they realize each other's identity. In another episode, she battles with her suitors, most of whom are taken captives or killed by her. It is only Giv, who passes the tests and ordeals imposed by Rustam on his daughter's suitors. Giv comes out victorious and is set to marry her. However, on the wedding night, she overpowers Giv and binds him down. Rostam comes to the rescue of Giv and mediates between the two. The Iranian hero Bijan is born of their marriage. Her exploits are also explained in other epic works such as Farāmarz-nāma, Borzu-nāma, and Bahman-nāma.

== Family tree ==
Garshasp | Mardas
Nariman | Zahhak
Sām | Mehrab Kaboli | Sindukht
Zāl | Rudaabeh
Goudarz | Shaghad | Rostam | Tahmineh
Afrasiab | Giv | Banu Goshasp | Faramarz | Sohrab
Manizhe | Bizhan
