= Rostam and Shaghad =

Ancient Persian heroic-tragic story

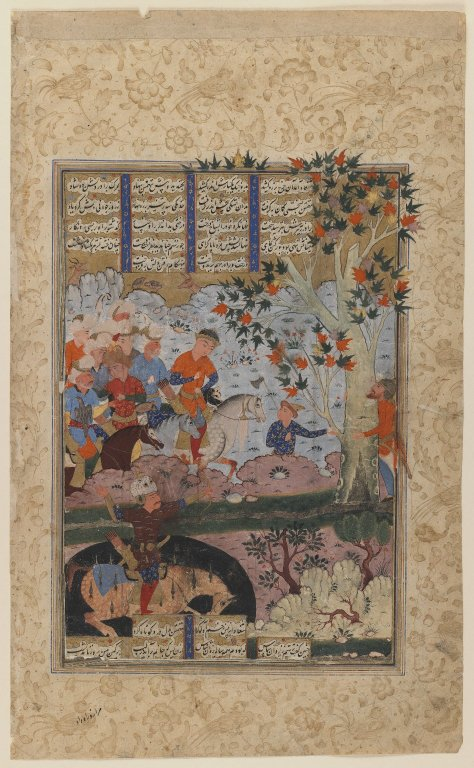

Shahnameh
- Language: Persian
- Format: Mathnawi
- From the book: Shahnameh
- Creator: Ferdowsi
- Year of Creation: Fourth and fifth centuries AH
- Genre: Epic poetry
- Topic: Hatred, conspiracy
- Style: Khorasani
- Number of verses: 347 Based on the Absolute Creative Edition
- Characters: Rostam, Zāl, Shaghad, Shah of Kabul, Rakhsh

Rostam and Shaghad (Persian: رستم و شغاد) is a heroic-tragic story with 212 verses in Shahnameh. The end of Rostam Dastan and his horse Rakhsh is in this story.

== Plot ==
Zāl was a warrior and musician. To him was born a beautiful boy whom his father named Shaghad. Astrologers predicted his ominous fortune and told Zāl that when he reached a man, Sam's seed would be destroyed by his hand. Zāl sought refuge in God from the game of fate, and when Shaghad became the narrator, he sent him to the Shah of Kabul. The Shah of Kabul gave his daughter to Shaghad and hoped that Rostam would no longer pay tribute to her out of respect for this bond. But Rostam's people took the usual tribute from him during the ransom. Shaghad called the act shameless and conspired with the Shah of Kabul to overthrow his brother. The Shah of Kabul plotted and spoke coldly at the Shaghad celebration. Shaghad went to Zabulistan to complain and complained about the Shah of Kabul. Rostam sneered at the brother of Kabul, but the Shah of Kabul apologized and went to greet Rostam, invited him to a party, and dragged him to a hunting ground where he had dug several wells the size of Rostam and Rakhsh, according to Shaghad. They were piled with spears and razors and covered their heads with rubble and dirt. Rostam and Rakhsh fell into a well and died from razor and spear wounds. Rostam, who had realized this conspiracy and the role of Shaghad before he died, after rebuking him, asked him to draw his bow and put it with two arrows so that if a lion came to him, it would not reach his life. Shaghad did so, but because he was afraid of Rostam, he hid behind an old sycamore tree on the well. Rostam stitched the Shaghad and the tree together with an arrow and thanked God for forcing him to take revenge on his ill-wishers before he died.

== In other works ==
- "The Eighth Labour" in In the small autumn yard in prison by Mehdi Akhavan-Sales
