= Battle of Rostam and Esfandiyār =

Legend in Persian mythology

Battle of Rostam and Esfandiyar
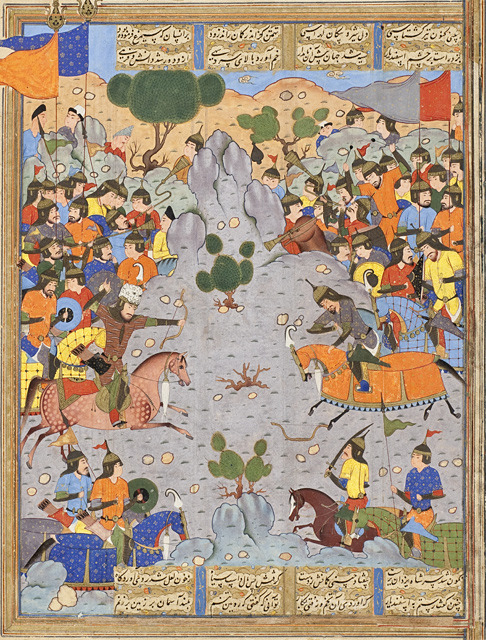
- Battle of Rostam and Esfandiyār

Shahnameh Wars
- Name of War: Battle of Rostam and Esfandiyār
- Battle location: The outskirts of Zabol
- The result of the battle: The Blindness And Death Of Esfandiyār
- Historical similarity: The Astyages and Cyrus the Great Era.

Iranian Gladiators
- Gladiators: Esfandiyār, Peshotanu, Bahman

Zabolian Gladiators
- Gladiators: Rostam, Zavara, Faramarz,

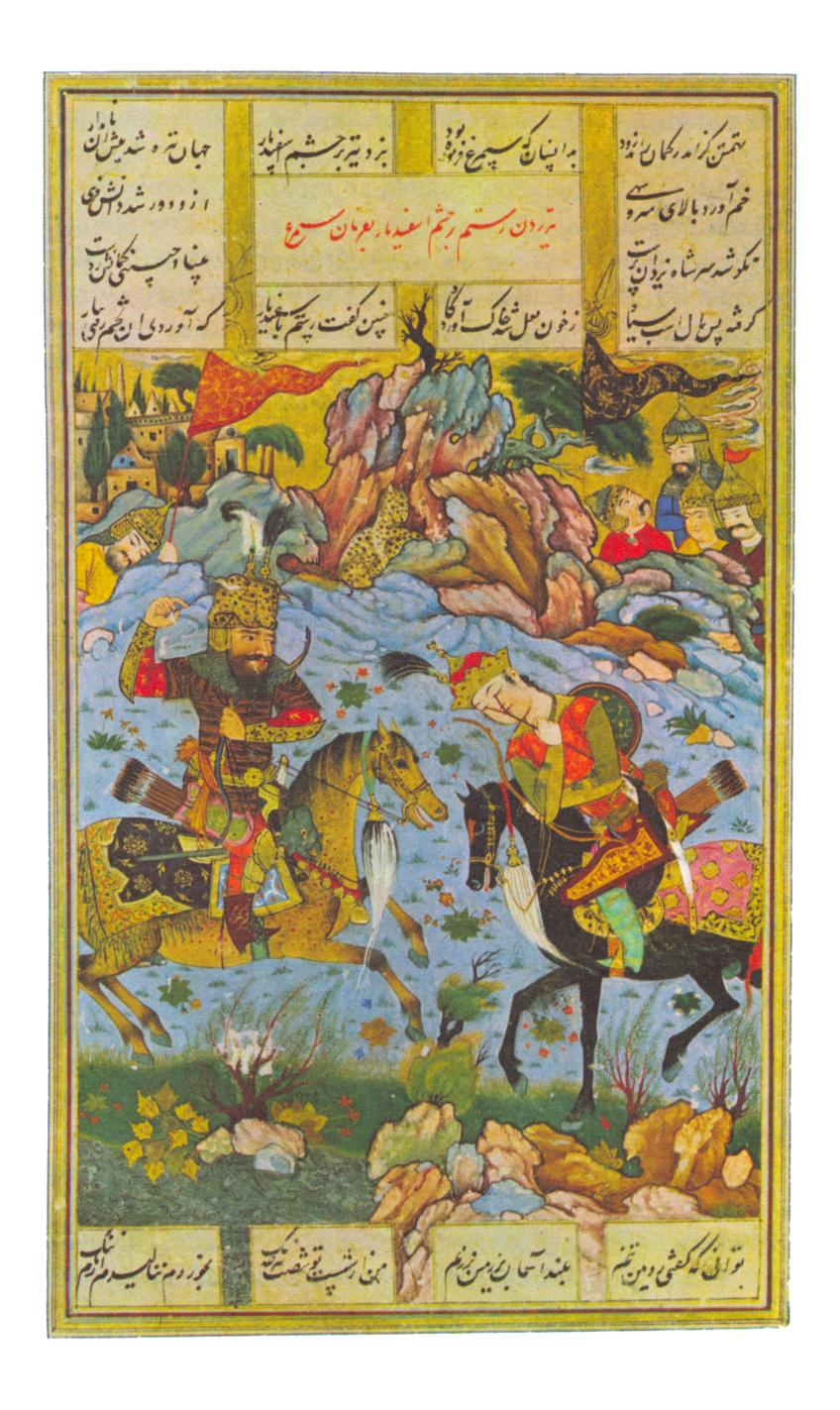

Battle of Rostam and Esfandiyār (Persian: نبرد رستم و اسفندیار) is a story in Ferdowsi's Persian epic, the Shahnameh. It narrates a war between two Iranian governments. The difference from the other wars is that only the warlords are engaged in duels and the division is both observers. The reason for the war is Rostam's disobedience to Esfandiyār's father, Goshtāsp, the king of Iran.

== Background ==
When Goshtāsp seized power in Iran, all countries were loyal except Zabol. Esfandiyar was commissioned to invade that country and capture Rostam, the leader of the Zabolians. Esfandiyar departed with a small number of troops and camped near a river near the city of Zabul. He sent his son, Bahman to convey the message of the Shah of Iran to the leaders of Zabul. There was no outcome from the negotiations, and the duel between the two warriors began.

This battle lasted for several days; sometimes Esfandiyar was victorious and sometimes Rostam was victorious but the outcome was not determined. Rostam complained to Zāl of this difficult battle. Zāl took Simurgh's help and Simurgh advised Rustam to win, but said the consequences of Esfandiyar's murder would be severe.

== Goshtasp's Palace ==
Esfandiyar was a senior commander for Goshtasp's strategic goals; he had previously won several major battles, but now had to kill Goshtasp's most powerful enemy and conquer the country. Esfandiyar had demanded a monarchy from his father, but Goshtasp's condition was to bring Rostam into captivity in the Iranian capital. Hearing the king's wishes, everyone was surprised; Esfandiyar's mother said this mission was suicide. No one could fight Rostam, and the Shah must renounce his desire to conquer Zabol. Immediately after the king's ruling, Esfandiyar, along with his son Bahman and his adviser Pashootan, moved to the Zabol border and camped on the banks of the river, and then his Bahman were sent to Zabol with a message.

== Analysis ==
According to scholars Maqsoodi and Bahar, the story of Rostam and Esfandiyār embodies certain ideology put forth by Ferdowsi. It is reflective of the greatness of the Iranian spirit and thought, displaying the contrast between the vision and power of Iranians against tyranny. Rostam embodies "special moral qualities" based on his action of defending his children and sacrifing his life in the process. Esfandiyār, on the other hand, represents high-handedness and arrogance, shown through his invulnerability and abuse of power: he uses religion for power and only recognizes his own authority. Therefore:

In this narrative, Rustam embodies freedom and independence, simultaneously remaining loyal to the throne. He sets out to fight against the tyranny of his ancestors, protecting the land of Iran. The story conveys the message that no dictator is invincible, emphasizing a positive ideology opposing tyranny.

Other scholars have emphasized the relevant of Claude Lévi-Strauss's structuralist theory to the Shahnameh, using the battle of Rostam and Esfandiyār as an example. This is expressed as the general contrast between good and evil, with Rostam representing the good and Esfandiyār the evil. The division of good and evil comes from a lack of advanced scientific perspectives that were not the forefront of phenomenological analysis during Ferdowsi's time. The battle is an extension of this overall theme, which in turn is based significantly on prior mythology and religion, such as doctrine of dualism found in Zoroastrianism. Ferdowsi's Shahnameh can be characterized as a continuation of the old Aryan, Indo-European tradition.

== Sources ==
- Ferdowsi Shahnameh. From the Moscow version. Mohammed Publishing. ISBN 964-5566-35-5
