= Sasanian conquest of the Suren Kingdom =

Iranian civil war in the 230s or 240s

- Part of Sasanian–Parthian conflicts
Date	230-240 AD
Location	Sistan and Makran
Result	Sasanian victory

Belligerents
Sasanian Empire	Surens of Sakastan

Sasanian conquest of the Suren Kingdom was an Iranian civil war between the Sasanian Empire and the Surens of Sakastan, which took place in late 230s or early 240s, in the last years of reign of Ardashir I. The conquest brought Sakastan (Sistan) under Ctesiphon's rule for the first time since the early first century AD.

While not much is known about this war through the historical sources, the war probably reflected in the Iranian national history in the shape of the Battle of Rostam and Esfandiyar, and also the Fall of House of Heroes, which took place in the aftermath of the battle between Rostan and Esfandiyar, when Kay Bahman, son of Esfandiyar, invaded Sakastan to revenge death of his father. Ironically, while Bahman was shah of Iran centuries before rise of Ardashir I of the Sasanian Empire, he is called with two names in both Shahnameh and Bahman Nameh: Kay Bahman and Ardashir.

== Sources ==
- Vakili, Sherwin (2014). Political History of the Arsacid Empire. pp. 1–996.
- Shahnameh of Ferdowsi
