= Babr-e Bayan =

Mythological suit of Rostam

Babr-e Bayān (Persian: بَبْرِ بَیان) or Palangina (پلنگینه) is the name of a suit that Rostam, the legendary Iranian hero wore in wars. The suit had a number of preternatural features. It was invulnerable against fire, water and weapon. Its color was dark and apparently it was hairy. Rostam, before going to battle, wore three levels of defensive suits: he first put on a zereh, then a gabr or jowshan, and lastly the Babr-e Bayan. According to some verses in the Shahnameh, Babr-e Bayan had been made out of the skin of a leopard (the name Palangineh refers to this). This account is also mentioned in some Sogdian texts. According to Faramarznameh, after the death of Rostam, the suit was passed to his son, Faramarz. The story of the armor is part of the five interpolated tales in the Shahnameh that demonstrated the extent of Rostam's popularity.

== Etymology ==
The name Babr-e Bayan consists of two components. Babr, the first component, simply means tiger in Middle Persian. Bayan, the second component, is not a Persian word and its origin is uncertain. There are several suggestions for this but none of them are convincing. Some sources referred to the reference to tiger skin (Babre bayan) as a suit that denoted power, influence, and authority.

The Shahnameh does not provide any explanation as to the origin of the armor. However, there are several sources that do provide such information. For instance, one account explains that, when Rostam was 14 years old, he killed a dragon known as Babr-e Bayan in India. The dragon lived in the sea, only emerging from it on one day a week. When Rostam killed the creature, he made a suit for himself out of its skin. There are accounts similar to this in other Persian epic poems. These are also corroborated by certain other sources such as an oral version recorded by a German scholar in the 19th century and the prose versions recorded in the collection of tumar (scrolls) that appeared during the Qajar period.

Another suggestion is that Bayan is the name of a city, most probably Bayana in India, although another city of this name is mentioned by early Islamic geographers, this Bayan being situated near the river Tigris in Khuzestan.
