= Faramarz-nama =

Persian epic poem

Faramarz Namah
- by Anonymous
- First published in: mid 11th-12th century
- Country: Iran
- Language: Classical Persian
- Subject(s): Persian mythology, history of Iran
- Genre: epic poem
- Media type: manuscript
- Pages: c. 500

Faramarz-nama or Faramarz-nameh (Persian: فرامرزنامه) is a Persian epic recounting the adventures of the hero Faramarz who is the son of Rustam.

== Manuscripts ==
The history book Tarikh-i Sistan (history of Sistan) mentions an account of Faramarz (akhbar-e Faramarz) in twelve volumes, but this work, which was likely in prose, has been lost. Instead, two Faramarz-namas (epic of Faramarz), both in the form of epic poems, are extant.

=== First manuscript ===
The first manuscript, which appears to be older, is written by an anonymous poet who introduces himself as an admirer of Ferdowsi and is dated between the mid-11th and 12th centuries. In the manuscript he introduces himself as a villager from Piruzabad (possibly an orthographical error, the text could have meant Forsabad, a town near Marv in Khorasan). The poet states that he composed the Faramarz-nama at the age of thirty-six and his major source is a book by Azadsarv. Like other Persian writers of epic poetry who came after Ferdowsi, the author of this work was heavily influenced by the style of the Shahnameh.

=== Second manuscript ===
The second Faramaz-nama is a known book in 464 pages and containing between nine and ten thousand distichs. It was printed in Bombay in 1906 by the Zoroastrian scholar named Rostam, son of Bahrām Soruš of Taft, a contemporary of Moẓaffar-al-Dīn Shah (r. 1896-1907) who traveled to India to gather stories about Farāmarz.

== Plot based on the first set of manuscripts ==
The plot is about the voyage of Faramarz to India in order to help the Indian king Nowshaad(Nowšād) Shah on the orders of the Iranian King Kay Kavus. Faramarz was ordered by Kay Kavus to help the Indian king Nowšād Shah. While there, he slays Konnās Dīv (a carrion-eating demon who had abducted the daughter of the Indian king), Karg-e Gūyā (a talking rhinoceros), Aždahā (q.v.; a dragon), and thirty thousand rhinoceroses. He then leaves for the land of Jaypāl where he has to accomplish seven labors or tasks. (compare with Ferdowsi who in his Shahnama has also mentioned the seven labors of Rustam). The cycle of seven stages or labors is a model for heroic epics in Persian literature. The sixth labor of Faramarz is a debate with an Indian Brahman; upon its conclusion the Brahman abandons his belief in idols and becomes a worshipper of Yazdān. This concludes the Faramaz-Nama which finishes without an account of Faramarz's seventh labor or his journey to Jaypāl.

== Plot based on the second set of manuscripts ==
The story begins with the Iranian hero Rustam. During Rustam travels to India, Faramarz is born from the union of Rustam and the daughter of the king of India. The second section recounts the exploits of Banu Gushasp, the daughter of Rustam. Here Faramaz is cast as a secondary role and story mainly focuses on Banu Gushasp. The third section comprises the version of Faramarz-nama discussed in the first set of manuscripts above. The fourth section of the book contains about 6000 couplets of poetry, which gives another version of Faramarz's aventures in India and Qīrvān. These exploits occur during the reign Kay Khusraw, and this section of the story may be considered a continuation of the first set of manuscripts. This fourth sections contains many episodes of Faramarz's adventure including:

- His battle with the warrior Tovorg
- His battle with the warrior Rāy
- His battle with a demon called Tajānū
- The return of Faramarz to Iran
- The second trip of Faramarz to India to vanquish Mahārak
- His trip to the island of Kahīlā1
- His slaying of the black demon who held the daughter of the king of Kahīlā captive
- The wedding of Faramarz with the daughter of the king of Kahīlā captive
- His travels to the lands of the East of India
- His battle with the people of the island of Fīlgušān (literally Elephanet ears)
- His debate with the Indian Brahmans
- The slaying of a roc and a dragon
- His journey to Qīrvān and the slaying of a dragon, a wolf, and a lion
- His acquisition of Garshasp's treasures; his travels to the lands of bāḵtar (west)
- His visit to the tomb of Hushang
- His falling in love with the daughter of Fartur-tush, the king of the fairies, the disappearance of the girl in a spring, and his search for her.
- His accomplishment of the seven tasks to reach the kingdom of fairies.
- The seven tasks include the slaying a lion, a wolf, a rhinoceros, a dragon, and an ogre (ḡūl), and traveling through cold and hot climes.
- Farāmarz reaches the land of Farṭūr-tuš and marries his daughter
- Farāmarz return to Iran where his wives give birth to two noble sons, Sām who is the daughter of the king of the fairies and Āḏar-Borzīn, whose mother is the daughter of the king of Kahīlā.

The exploits of Sām are the subject of Khwaju Kermani's Sām-nāma (8th/14th century). The adventures of Āḏar-Borzīnare are recounted in the last part of the Bahman-nama.
