= Kay Bahman =

Iranian mythological figure

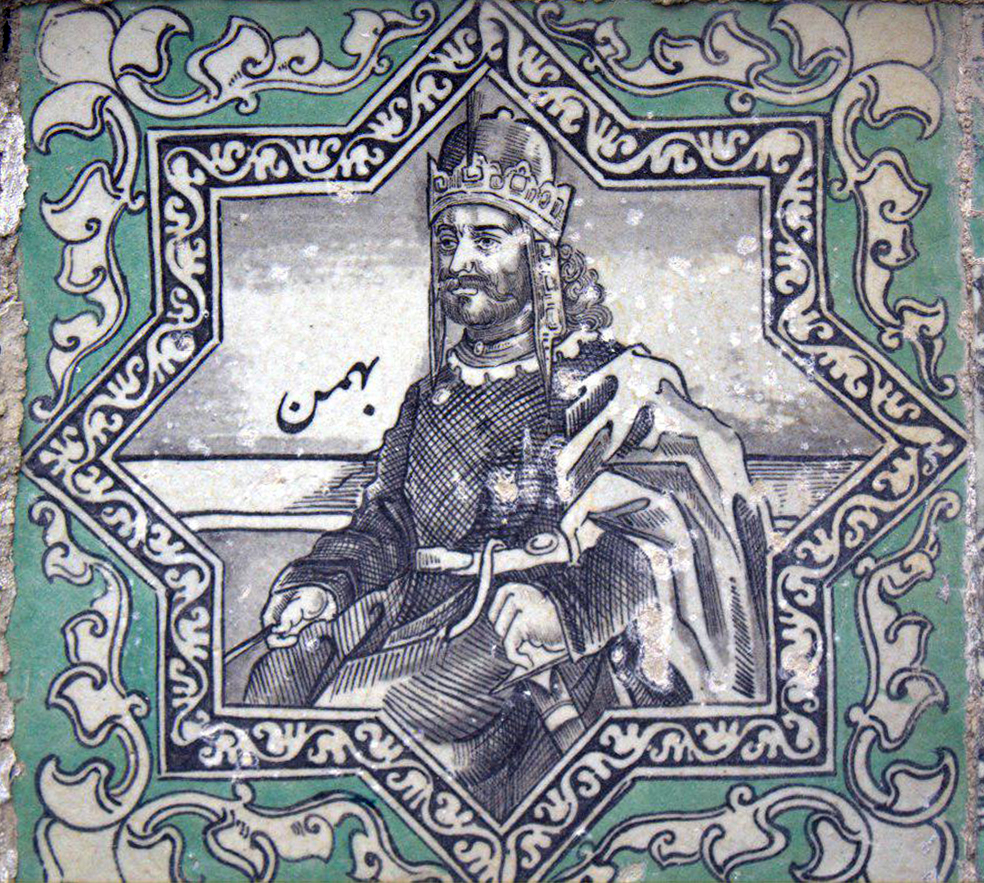
Illustration of Kay Bahman in the Tekyeh Moaven al-molk in Kermanshah

Kay Bahman or Wahman (from Middle Persian: Wahman "good mind"; Persian: کی‌بهمن) is a figure from Iranian mythology. The stock epithet Kai identifies Bahman as one of the Kayanian kings of Iranian oral tradition.

The 3rd-6th century Sasanians claimed to descend from Bahman and the Kayanids. This myth was combined with another legend in which the Sasanians were imagined to have descended from the Achaemenids, and in the post-Sasanian period Bahman came to equated with both Artaxerxes I and Cyrus the Great.

== Legends ==
In the genealogy of the legendary Kayanian dynasty, Bahman is the son of Esfandiyar (hence his also being referred to in Middle Persian as 'Vohuman Asfandyar'), grandson of Goshtasp, husband of [daughter of the Egyptian king ] Komani/Homai, and father of Dara/Darab. Other details vary: Several different Arabic and Persian sources (e.g. al-Tabari and ibn al-Balkhi) assert that Bahman had five children; two sons, Dara/Darab and Sasan/Sassan, and three daughters, Komani/Homai (stock epithet: Chehrazad), Bahmandokht and Farnak. Kay Bahman would eventually succeed his grandfather, Goshtasp, as king. Bahman is also known as Ardeshir (Artaxerxes), making a historical parallel to the historical Achaemenid king. Al-Tabari says that he was the son of Queen Esther.

In the Bahman-nama (composed ca. 1100 CE, not to be confused with a 15th-century hagiography of the Deccan Bahmanids) Bahman is portrayed as being asked by Rostam to marry Katayun/Kasayun, daughter of the King of Kashmir. Bahman does so, but subsequently has to flee to Egypt, where he marries Homai, the daughter of the Egyptian king, with whom he has a daughter also named Homai. Other sources have Bahman marrying his own daughter Komani/Homai on account of her great beauty, and that Dara/Darab was the result of this union. In one tradition (reiterated by ibn al-Balkhi), the marriage was denied and Homai dies a spinster.

The name 'Bahman'/'Wahman' is a theophoric reflecting Middle Persian Vohuman, Avestan Vohu Manah, the Amesha Spenta (Ameshaspand) that is the hypostasis of the "Good Mind" or "Good Disposition." Unlike most figures of Iranian oral tradition, Bahman does not however appear in the surviving Avesta. He is however referred to in the Zand-i Wahman yasn (also known as the Bahman Yasht, which—despite that name—is not an Avestan Yasht, but a medieval pseudo-prophetic/apocaplyptic text). The figure is also mentioned in the 9-11th century texts of Zoroastrian tradition, specifically, the Middle Persian Bundahishn (GBd 36.9) and the Denkard (VII.6), both of which enumerate the Kayanian kings. In both the Zand-i Vohuman Yasht (3.20-29) and the Denkard, Bahman is described as "one of the greatest Mazdayasnian kings of Iran."

"The importance attached to Bahman's reign in Zoroastrian literature can be seen in a passage in the Bahman yašt where the reigns of the kings are likened to tree branches made of seven metals." In this comparison, which lists the reigns in order of perceived importance, the 'silver' reign of Bahman appears second, after the 'golden' reign of (likewise mythological) Goshtasp and before the 'brass' reign of the Sasanian Ardashir I, the 'bronze' reign of the Arsacid Balash, the 'tin' reign of the Sasanian Bahram V Gor, the 'steel' reign of the Sasanian Khosrow I Anushirvan, with 'iron' (which is considered impure in Zoroastrianism) representing the "rule of the shaggy-haired demons (dēws) born of the seed of anger, probably referring to the rule of the Arabs."

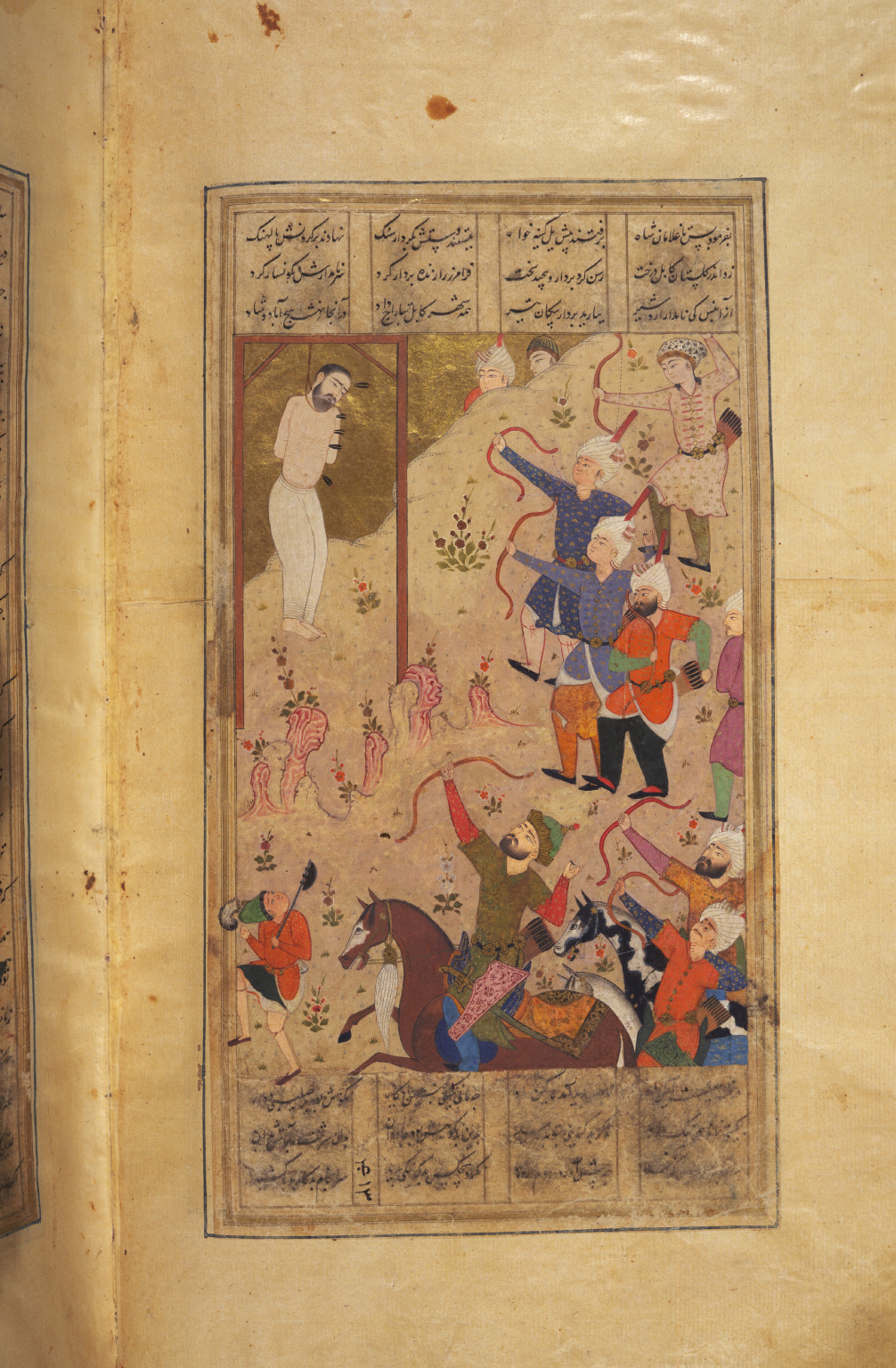
Persian miniature: Bahman has Faramarz shot full of arrows in Kabul

In Firdausi's Shahnameh (ca. 1000 CE), which versifies and embellishes previous tradition, Bahman's father Esfandiar is portrayed as having been killed by Rostam. The Shahnameh goes on to describe how Bahman sets off with a large army to avenge his father's death. In the meanwhile however, Rostam had already been treacherously killed by Rostam's half-brother Shaghad. Frustrated, Bahman instead kills Rostam's son Faramarz, imprisons Rostam's father Zal (whom he however releases on the behest of his uncle Peshotan), and lays waste to Rostam's feudal lands.

Again, the details in other sources vary. According to al-Tabari, al-Masudi and al-Atir, Bahman himself killed not only Rostam but Faramarz, Zal and Rostam's brother Zavara as well. Ibn al-Balkhi includes only Faramarz and Zal. The Bahman-nama has Bahman mourning for Rostam, who—along with Zavara—are described as having been killed by the king of Kabul. In this text, Bahman does however travel to Rostam's (now Faramarz's) fiefdom, where he battles Rostam's son (who then flees) but where he takes Zal prisoner. Bahman then pursues Rostam's daughter's Banu Goshasp and Zar Banu to Kashmir, and then Faramarz to India, where Faramarz is finally slain. Having captured Rostam's/Faramarz's lands, Bahman then seeks to destroy the tombs of Rostam and his ancestors (Garshasp, Nariman and Sam). At each of the respective tombs he receives a precious gift and a message asking him to stay his hand, which he does. Chastened, he then frees Zal and Rostam's daughters, and rebuilds everything he had previously destroyed. In the Bahman-nama, Bahman is killed by a dragon while out hunting. In Iranian tradition, such a fate is typically reserved for villains, and this is the only instance in which a legitimate king is said to have been killed in such a fashion.

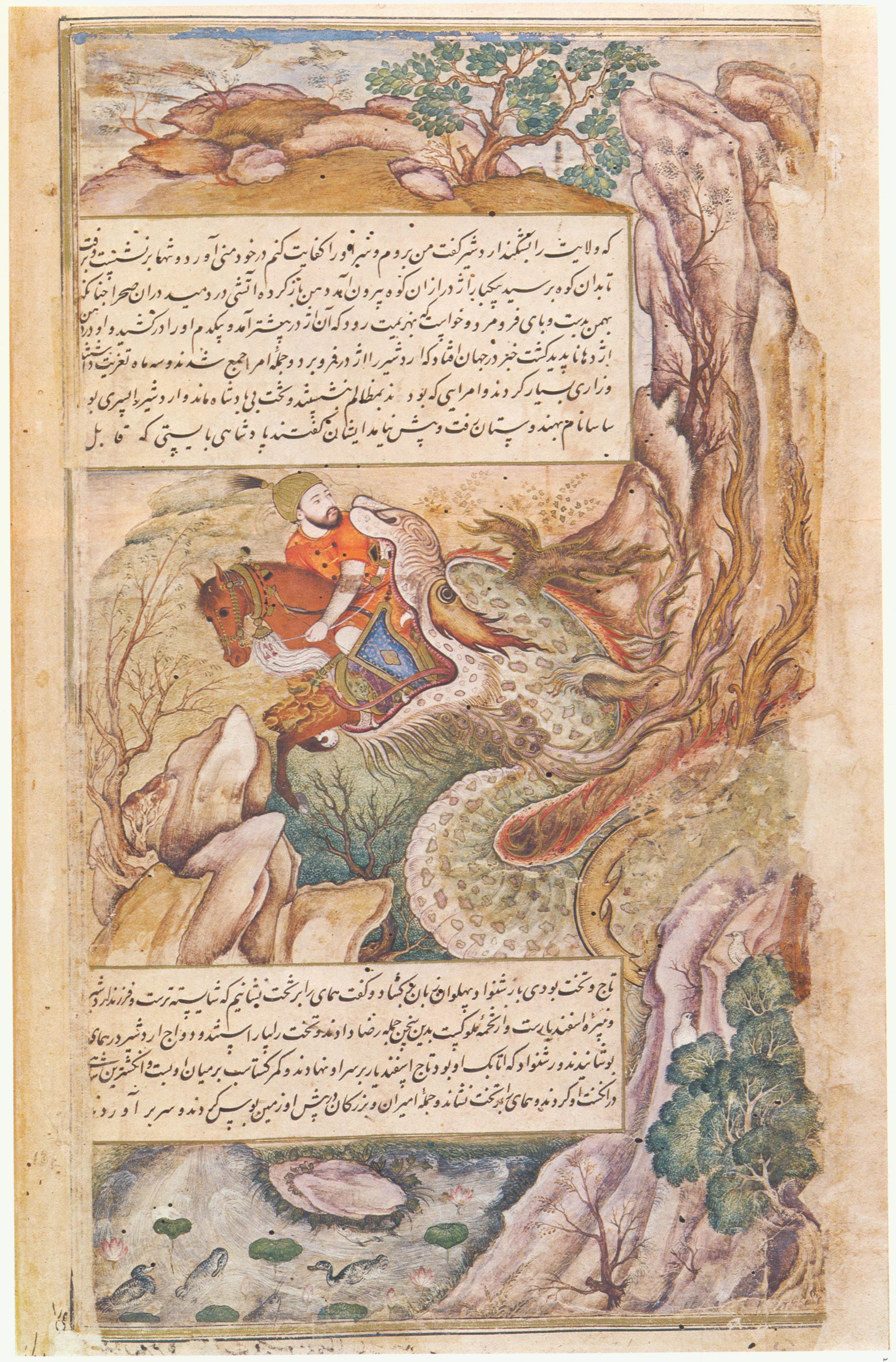
Bahman and his horse are swallowed by a dragon. Darab-nama of Akbar, c. 1585.

The length of his reign varies; the Middle Persian Bundahishn and most of the Arabic and Persian sources note 112 years, others note 120 and yet others 80 years. The sources agree on the line of succession and state that Bahman selected his daughter (or daughter/wife) Homai to succeed him, instead of Sassan, the heir-apparent (see below for the result of the conflict that ensued). In another version of the tale, Homai succeeds Bahman only because Dara is not yet born when Bahman dies.

Although there is no epigraphically attested figure to whom the Bahman of legend corresponds, several post-Sasanian Arabic and Persian commentaries assign the mythological king several features and events that do correspond to historical figures. Several sources ascribe to Bahman deeds that are known to have been performed by Cyrus the Great, including freeing the Jews from Babylonian captivity, and two sources assert that Cyrus was appointed to this task by Bahman. Other sources give Bahman the epithet "the long-handed," which identifies him with Artaxerxes I 'Longimanus' ("the long-handed"). Yet other sources identify the figure of legend as 'Ardeshir Bahman', perhaps a reference to Artaxerxes II 'Mnemon', who probably had the Old Persian form of 'Bahman' (> Greek 'Mnemon' "mindful") as a name. In one legend, Bahman's elder son Dara(b) is killed in battle with Alexander the Great, that is, Dara/Darab is identified as Darius III and which then makes Bahman a figure of the 4th century BCE. In another tradition, Alexander is the son of Dara/Darab and his wife Nahid, who is described to be the daughter of "Filfus of Rûm" i.e. "Philip the Greek" (cf. Philip II of Macedon).

In the typically contrived genealogies of Iranian dynasties, Ardashir I—founder of the Sasanian dynasty—traces his lineage to Bahman. In one tale (which in the Shahnameh is a continuation of the above-mentioned story of Bahman and Faramarz), Bahman's second son Sassan, resenting his father's choice of Homai as heir, leaves the house and travels to Nishapur, where he takes a wife, and with whom he has a son whom he names after himself, and who would be the grandfather of Ardashir I. In another tale later in the Shahnameh, Dara has a son named Sassan, who went to India, where he took a wife, and whose descendants were all named Sassan, and whose great-great-grandson was the father of Ardashir I. The first Shahnameh story, though differing from the older Bundahishn and al-Tabari in the intervening lineage, concur in that they all trace Ardashir's lineage to Bahram through Bahram's younger son Sassan. On the other hand, the Shahnameh's second story is consistent with the account of the Karnamag in that it traces Ardashir's lineage to Bahram through Humai. "In any case all these stories were obviously fabricated in the Sasanian period to provide evidence for the legitimacy of Ardašīr and his descendants."

== Bibliography ==
- Khaleghi-Motlagh, Djalal (1989), "Bahman", Encyclopaedia Iranica, New York: Routledge & Kegan Paul, pp. 489–490.

Preceded by Vishtaspa	Legendary Kings of the Shāhnāma; 112 years (2991–3103 after Keyumars)	Succeeded by Humay Chehrzad
