= Jahan Pahlavan =

Iranian soldier

Jahan Pahlavan (Persian: جهان‌پهلوان) was a rank champion in the Iranian Guards during the Sasanian Empire.

In the book Shahnameh, Ferdowsi calls Rostam, the son of Zāl, "Jahan Pahlavan".

In contemporary Iranian history, Gholamreza Takhti is referred to as the "Jahan Pahlavan". According to Sadruddin Elahi, the term "Jahan Pahlavan" in reference to Gholamreza Takhti was first used by Siavash Kasrai in a poem by him called the Jahan Pahlavan, and this title remained on the throne.

== See also ==
- Pahlevan of Iran
