= Zavara =

Iranian legendary hero

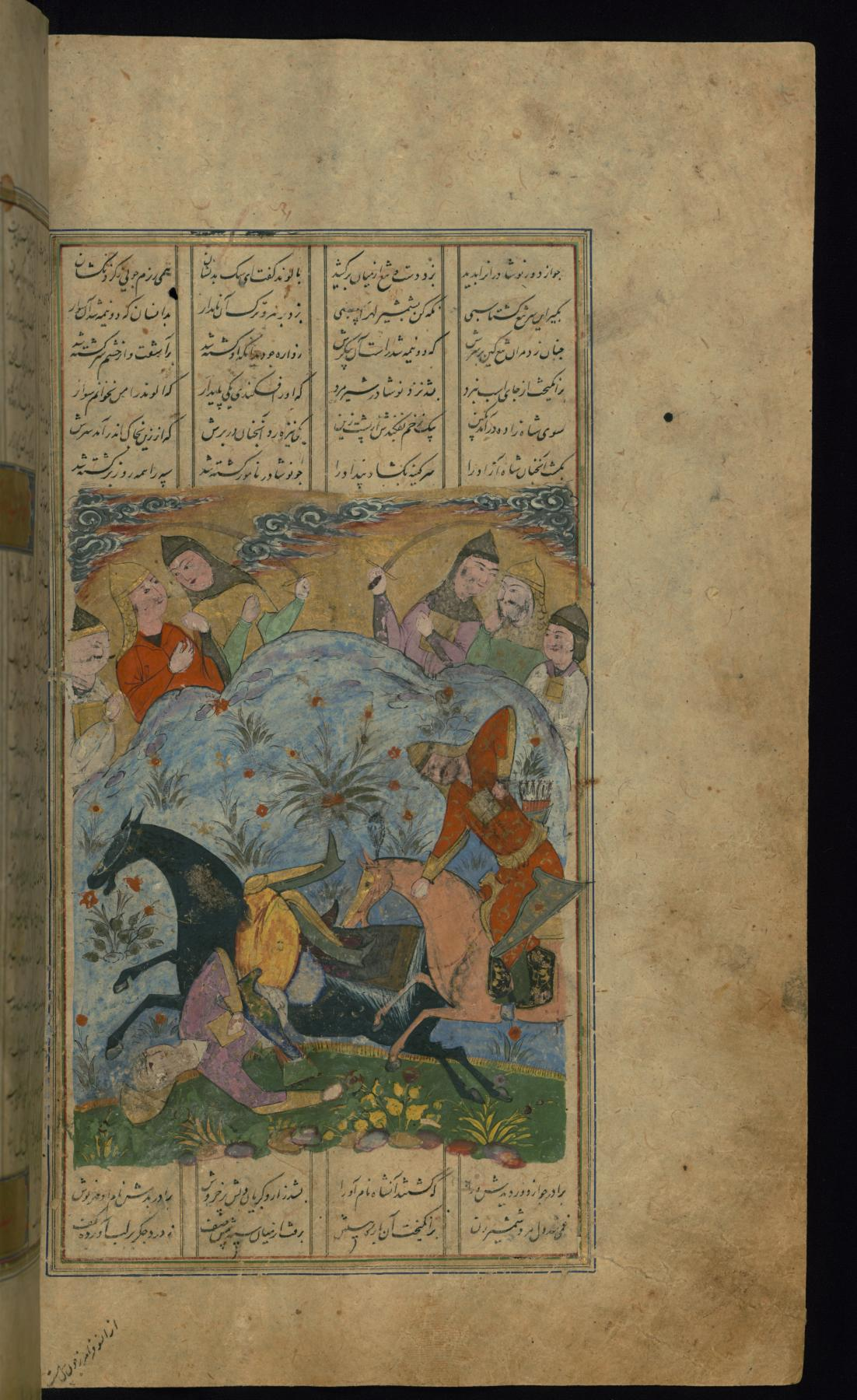
Shahnameh illustration of Zavara killing Isfandiyar's son Nush-Azar

Zavare or Zavareh (Persian: زواره [zævɑːre]) is an Iranian hero in Ferdowsi's Shahnameh. He was the brother of Rostam and the son of Zal and played an important role in the Iranian invasion of Turan after the murder of Siyavash by the command of the Turanian king, Afrasiyab. It is said that Zavara killed the Turanian prince Sokhra in the same way that the Turanians killed the Iranian prince Siyavash.

And Zavare left the camp [to fight with them], with the god's help and with the shah's will.

— Ferdowsi, Sohrab's War in Shahnameh

Zavare was killed by his half-brother, Shaghad.

== Zavara in the manuscript tradition ==
Zavara also appears in several illustrated manuscripts of the Shahnameh, especially those produced during the Timurid and Safavid periods. In these paintings, he is usually shown beside Rostam or as part of the Iranian army during the campaign against Turan, which reflects his role in the revenge for Siyavash. The visual depictions of Zavara in later manuscripts suggest that his character continued to be remembered not only through the text of the epic but also through its artistic tradition.
