= Mardas =

Mardas (Greek: Μάρδας) is a Greek surname. It is the surname of:

- Magic Alex (1942–2017), born as Alexis Mardas, British-Greek electronics engineer.
- Dimitris Mardas (born 1955), Greek economist and politician.
- Henadz Mardas (1970–2020), Belarusian football coach and player.

== See also ==
- Cham Mardas, a village in Iran.
