= Nariman (Shahnameh) =

Character in Shahnama

Shahnameh Men
- Name: Nariman
- Nickname: Gladiator
- post: The head of the dynasty

Other Information
- Well known: Siege of Mount Sepand Castle
- Lineage: Zabolian
- Historical similarity: Ariaramnes

Family members
- Boys Name: Sām
- Grandson Name: Zāl
- Result Name: Rostam

Nariman (Persian: نریمان) is an ancient Persian name meaning "faith and brightness".

He is the son of Gershasp, and father of Sām who himself is grandfather of Rostam the hero (Rostam's father was Zal).

== Nariman in Shahnameh ==
Nariman was reported in Shahnameh at the time of Fereydun. According to the Shahnameh, Nariman was one of Fereydun allies during the reign of Fereydun.

Nariman perished in the war that led to the siege of a fortress on Mount Sepand.

This story is told by Zāl for Rostam to persuade him Nariman revenge on the inhabitants of the castle.

== Sources ==
- Ferdowsi Shahnameh. From the Moscow version. Mohammed Publishing. ISBN 964-5566-35-5
