= Rostam =

Persian mythological hero of the epic poem Shahnameh

Jahan Pahlavan Rostam
- رستم
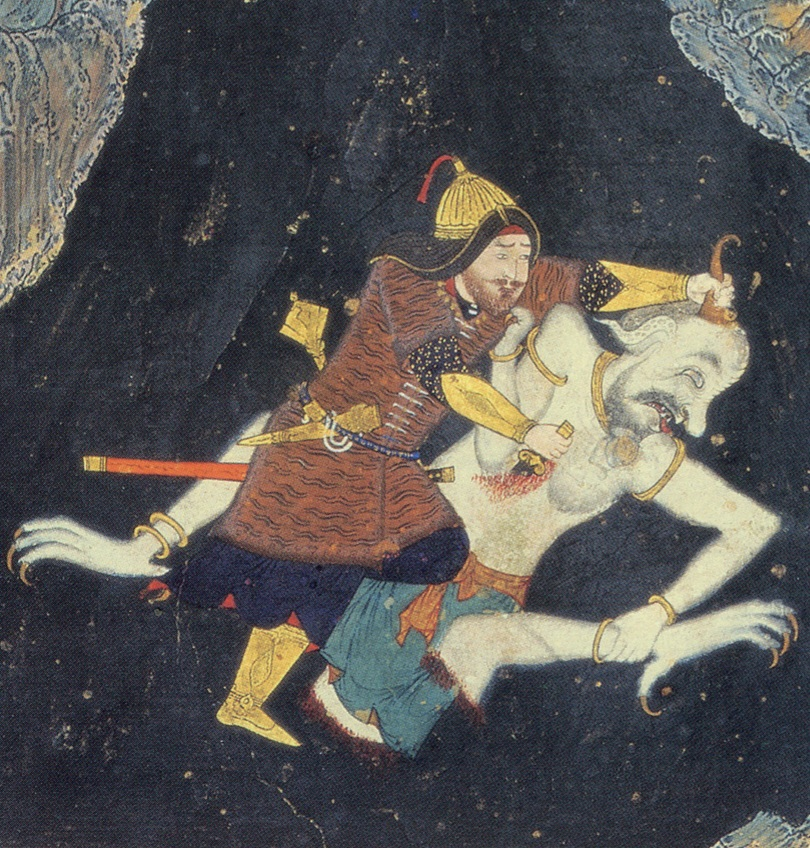
- Rostam killing the White Div from the Baysunghur Shahnameh (1430 AD)
- Born: Zabulistan (present-day Iran and Afghanistan)
- Died: Kabulistan (present-day Kabul, Afghanistan)
- Cause of death: With the conspiracy of his half-brother Shaghad, he fell into a well full of poisoned spears and was killed in Kabulistan.
- Other names: Rustam; Rustem
- Known for: Seven Labours; Battle with Sohrab; Battle with Esfandiyār killing White Div
- Spouse: Tahmina
- Children: Sohrab; Faramarz; Siyâvash (adopted son); Banu Goshasp (In Banu Goshasp Nama)
- Parents: Zal (father); Rudaba (mother)
- Family: Sām (grandfather); Zavara (brother); Shaghad (half brother)

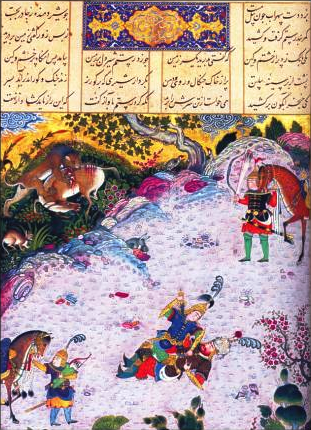
Sohrab and Rostam fighting: from "The Shahnama of Shah Tahmasp" (c. 1522)

Rostam or Rustam (Persian: رستم [rosˈtæm]) is an Iranian legendary hero in Iranian mythology and historical tradition. Being the son of Zāl and Rudaba, his life and work was immortalized by the 10th-century Persian poet Ferdowsi in the Shahnameh, or Epic of Kings, which contains pre-Islamic Iranian folklore and history. However, the roots of the narrative date much earlier.^{[citation needed]}

In the Shahnameh, Rostam and his predecessors are Marzbans of Sistan (present-day Iran and Afghanistan). Rostam is best known for his tragic fight with Esfandiyār, the other legendary Iranian hero; for his expedition to Mazandaran (not to be confused with the modern Mazandaran Province). He is also known for the story of his Seven Labours.

He rides the legendary stallion Rakhsh and wears a special suit named Babr-e Bayan in battles.

== Origins ==
While the narrative of the Shahnameh is the definitive work on Rostam, Ferdowsi did not invent the character; Rostam stories were popular as far back as the seventh century in Pars and originated much earlier, likely in Eastern Iranian-speaking territories.

References to Rostam have been found in Sogdian manuscripts. One manuscript, dating to the ninth century, contains part of a tale about Rostam and demons. This may be a version of Rostam's seven labours, or a separate story. Another manuscript contains a prayer, which includes the wish that its subject become "a bold knight like Rostam".

Other possible references to Rostam have been suggested based on iconography such as his zīn-i palang or "panther-skin garment":

The material surveyed so far proves that the Rustam legend was fully formed and well known in Western Iran by the seventh century AD at the latest and in the Eastern Iranian lands by the early eighth century. In some recent publications Frantz Grenet has attempted to find pictorial allusions several centuries earlier, in the “sīmurgh” depicted on the buckle of Shapur I (AD 240–272) on the Rag-i Bībī rock relief in northern Afghanistan, and in the scene of a prince breaking in a foal depicted on an Eastern Sasanian silver dish attributed to the first half of the fourth century. Nicholas Sims-Williams has referred to the personal name Purlang-zin, spelt πορλαγγοζινο in Greek script, in a Bactrian document which was almost certainly written in the fourth century under Sasanian rule, claiming that this may be translated as “the man with the panther’s skin” and that it represents “a clear reference to the zīn-i palang of Rustam.” [...] the first element of this name, is the Bactrian word for “panther” or “leopard”.

== Background ==
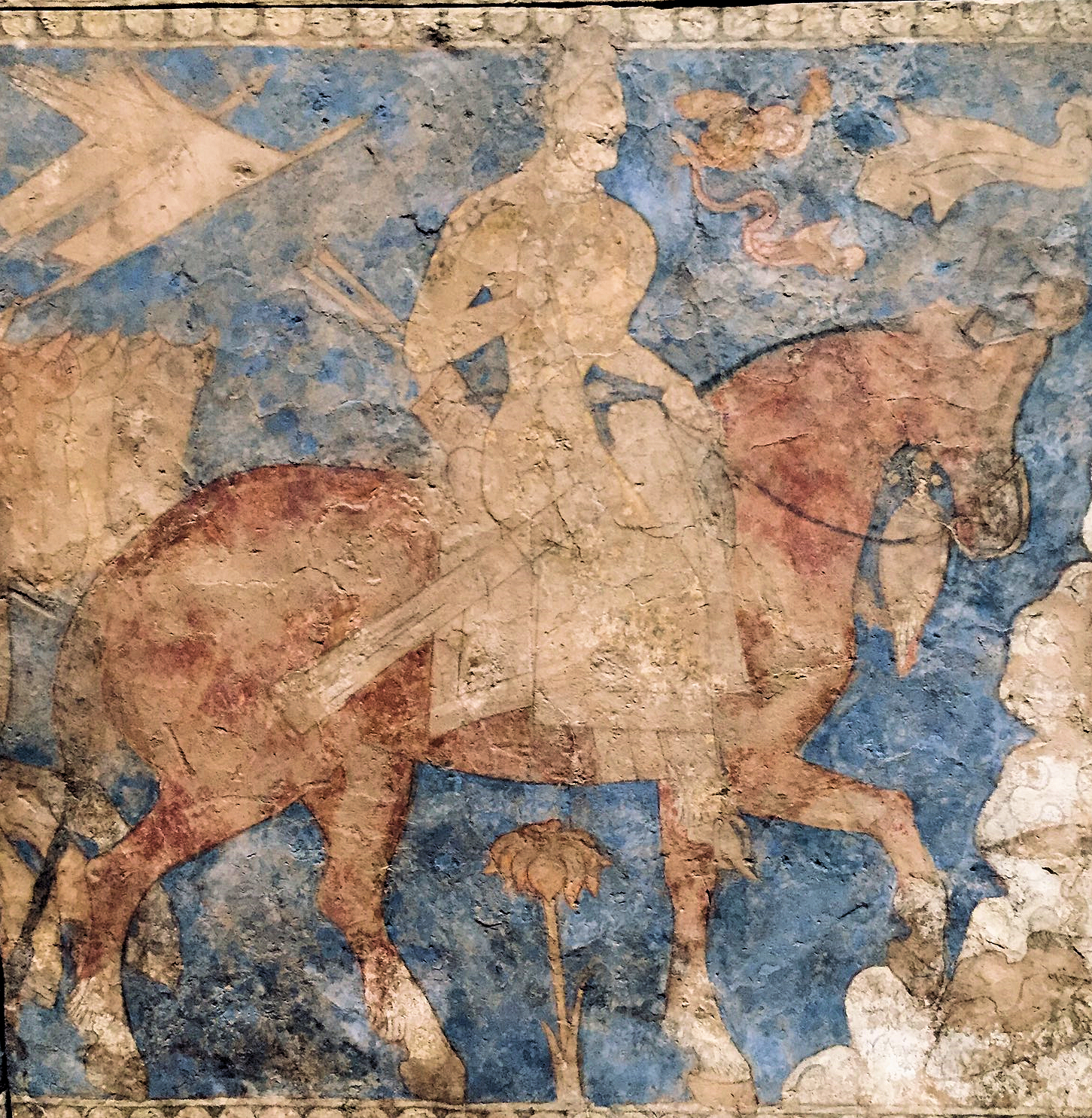
Rostam in the murals of Panjikent, 7-8th century CE. He is represented with an elongated skull, in the fashion of the Alchon Huns.

In the Shahnameh, Rostam is a native of Zabulistan, a historical region roughly corresponding to today's Zabul Province, southern Afghanistan. His mother Rudaba was a princess of Kabul. Rostam is the champion of champions and is involved in numerous stories, constituting some of the most popular (and arguably some of most masterfully created) parts of the Shahnameh. In Shahnameh, Rostam—like his grandfather Sam—works as both a faithful military general as well as king-maker for the Kayanian dynasty of Persia.

As a young child, he slays the maddened white elephant of the king Manuchehr with just one blow of the mace owned by his grandfather Sam, son of Nariman. He then tames his legendary stallion, Rakhsh.

The etymology of Rostam's name is from Common Iranian "*rautas-taxma-, "'river-strong', i.e. 'as strong as a river', Rostam's mother is Rūdāba "(she) of the River Water", and his father is Zāl, who has white hair.

=== Birth and early life ===
Rostam's mother Rudaba, the princess of Kabul, was known for her peerless beauty, and Rostam's father was Zāl. Zāl was one of Persia's most powerful warriors and a great general who conquered many rebellious tribes and ruled over Zabulistan. Zāl was known for his wisdom and was unparalleled in riding and fighting on horseback. He once demonstrated his skills to Emperor Manuchehr to seek his approval to marry his lover Rudaba.

In Persian mythology, Rudaba's labour in giving birth to Rostam was prolonged due to the extraordinary size of her baby - so much so that Zāl, her lover and husband, felt sure that his wife would die in labour. Rudaba was indeed near death when Zāl decided to summon the Simurgh, which duly appeared and instructed him upon how to perform a Rostamzad, a Caesarean section, thus saving both Rudaba and the child.

After Zāl's father, Sam, learned of his grandchild's birth, he rushed to see Rostam and was overjoyed. Rostam was brought up and trained by Zāl in warfare. When Rostam single-handedly slew a mad elephant, his father sent him on his first military assignment.

Rostam's task was to conquer the fortress on the summit of Mt Sipand where his great grandfather, Nariman, once besieged it and was slain in the battle. Rostam breached the fortress, defeated the enemy, ransacked its treasury and reported his success to his father, Zāl, and grandfather, Sam.

=== Haft Khan ===
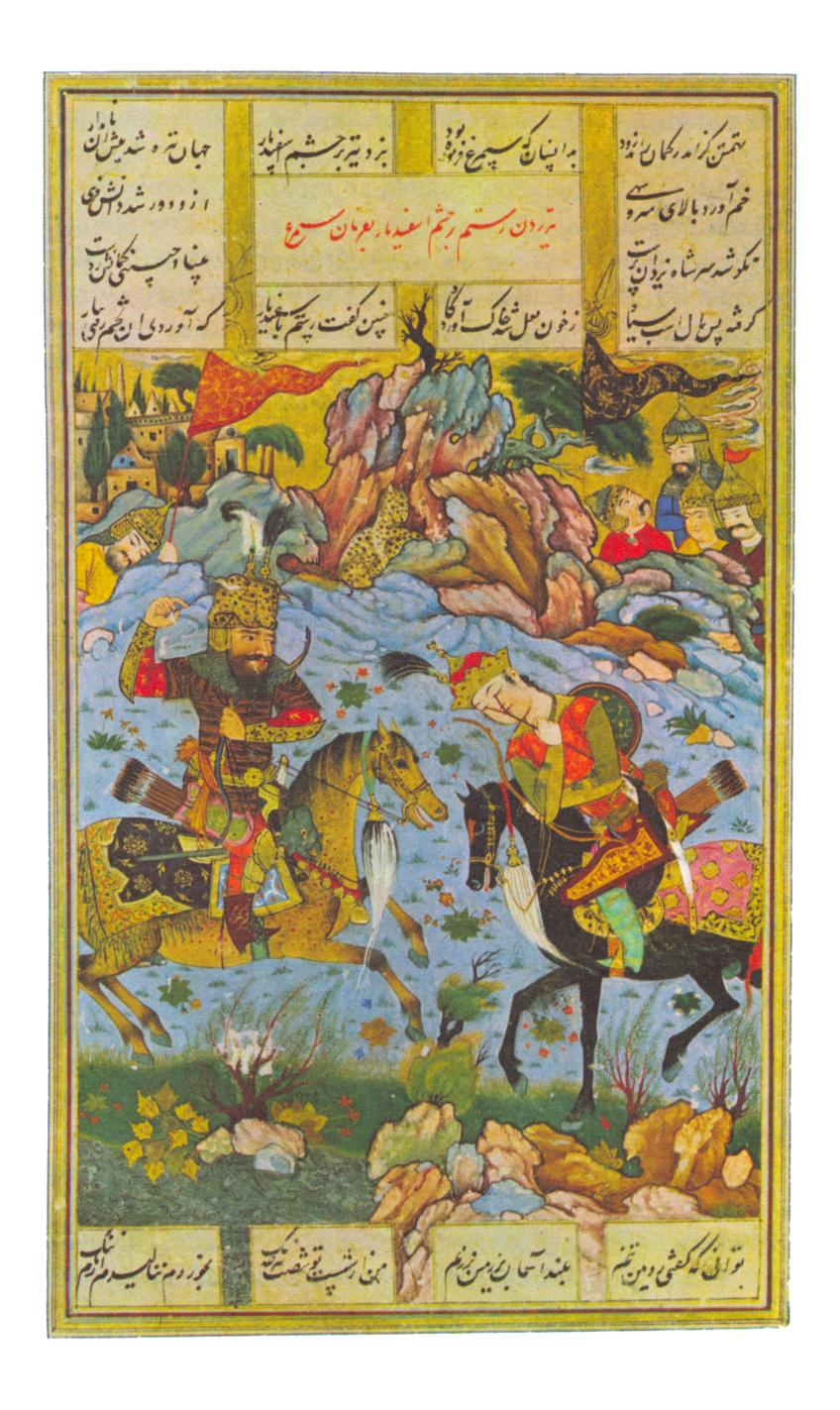
Rostam kills Esfandiyār. Medieval Persian miniature

He undertakes a heroic journey to save his sovereign, the over-confident Kay Kāvus who is captured by the Divs of Mazandaran. This journey is called "Rostam's Seven Quests".

There are some similarities between the legends of Rostam and those pertaining to the great Irish hero Cú Chulainn. They both defeat a ferocious beast as a young man, slay their sons in combat ("Rostam and Sohrab", a motif also found in the Hildebrandslied), are virtually invincible in combat, and are murdered by treachery while killing their murderer on their last breath.

Two Persian heroes, Rostam and Esfandiyār, share stories with the Labours of Hercules.

==== Alternate views ====
It is written by the Royal Central Asian Society in the Journal of the Royal Central Asian Society that the struggle between Rostam and the Div-e Sepid "White Demon" represents a struggle between Persians and invaders from the northern Caspian provinces.

=== Death ===
In Shahnameh, the life spans of the heroes who are from the generation of Sām (Rostam's grandfather) are described as being very long, and that of Rostam fits this pattern: he has reached the age of six hundred at the time of his violent demise (dying at the hand of his envious half-brother Shaghad, who kills him by throwing him into a well full of poisoned spears). In this incident, Rostam's faithful steed Rakhsh and the hero's brother, Zavareh are also killed.

== Descent and other relations ==
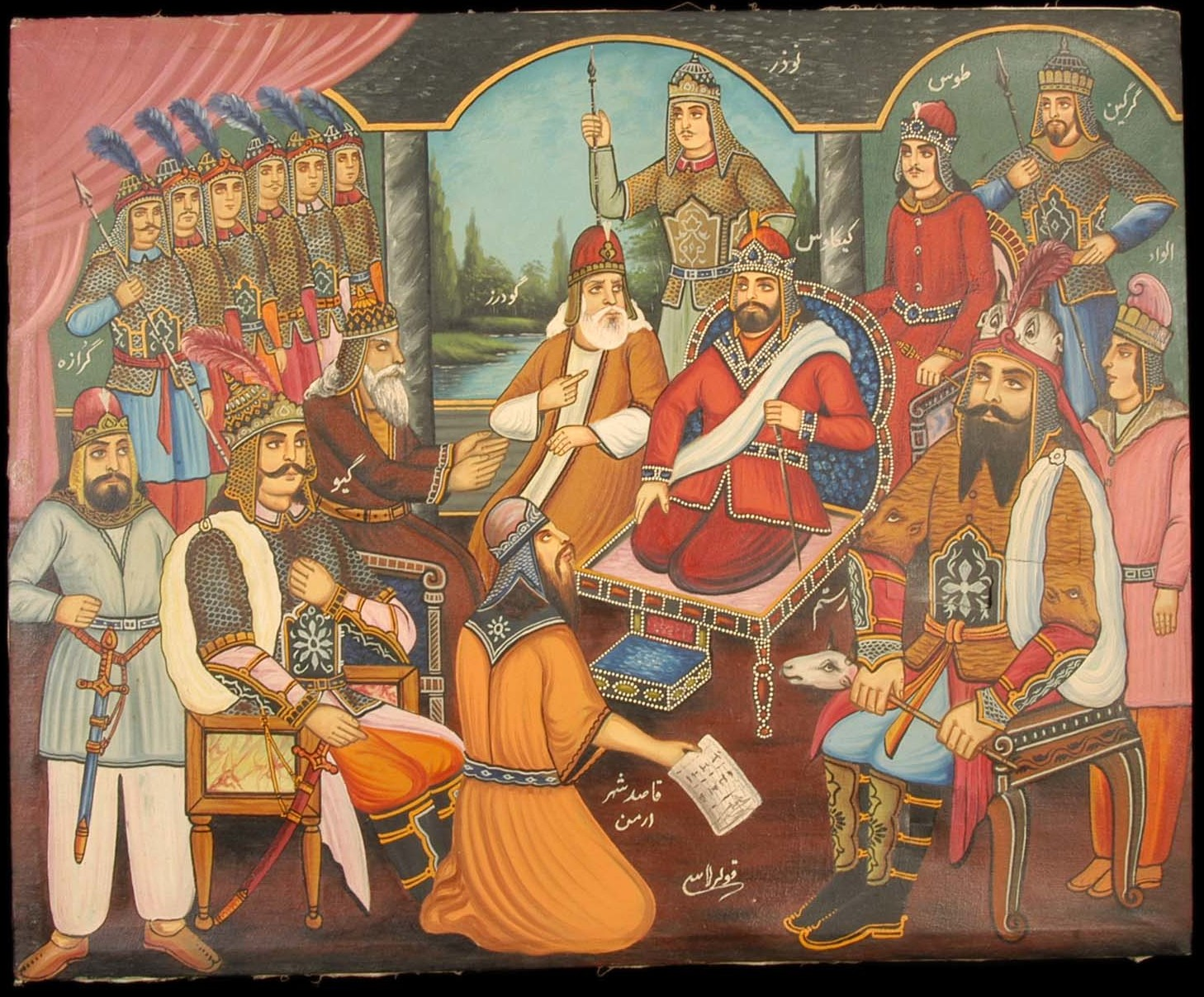
Rostam and Kay Kavus in castle

With Tahmineh, princess of Samangan, Rostam had a son called Sohrab, who was killed accidentally by his father in the time of Kay Kavus. In Banu Goshasp Nama Rostam later had a daughter called Banu Goshasp, who had a full brother called Faramarz, and both became renowned heroes in Turan and India. Goshasp, through her marriage with Giv had a son, Bijan.

Rostam had also a half brother called Shaghad, who was always jealous of him and provoked his death.

Just as famous as Rostam was his horse Rakhsh, which had an incredibly long life like Rostam, due to divine protection, and died at the same time as Rostam.

== Historical basis ==
Ernst Herzfeld maintained that the dynasty of Gondophares represented the House of Suren, highest of the five premier families of Parthian Empire, invested with the hereditary right of commanding the royal armies, and placing the crown on the king's head at the coronation. Probably when around 129 BC, nomad peoples, especially the Indo-Scythians (Sacaraucae, Old Persian Sakaravaka "nomadic Saka” or Saraucae) and the Tocharians attacked the eastern frontier of Parthia, defense was entrusted by the Parthian emperors to the Surens; and the latter eventually not only repelled the Indo-Scythians, but pursued them into Arachosia and the Punjab, this event probably representing interitus Saraucarum ( the perishing of the Sacaraucae) of Gnaeus Pompeius Trogus (Prologue 42).

Echoes of these events are preserved in the legends of the Sistān cycle, partly incorporated in the Shahnameh, but once also surviving as independent epics, such as the Garšāspnāma mentioned in the Tārikh-e Sistān, and the Ketāb al-Sakisarān cited by al-Masudi. These related the deeds of the hero Garshasp and his descendants, Narimān, Sām, Zāl or Dastān, and above all of the latter's son Rostam. It is difficult to relate the Indo-Parthian names known from coins and history to those of the epic, which are possibly honorific titles, since a recently reported silver coin describes Gondophares (spelt in Greek script Hyndopharres) as surnamed Sām. A single ruler may of course have received more than one such title, and the historical names may be repeated in succeeding generations.

Scholars note Rostam was not Ferdowsi's invention. By the end of the Sasanian period, legends of Rostam were well known across all Iranian lands. Ferdowsi was chiefly responsible for glorifying his fame. A substantial collection of Pahlavi texts spoke of the legend of Rostam. The orientalist Josef Markwart traced the background of Rostam, showing his Parthian (Arsacid) origins. The home of Rostam in the Shahnameh was Sakastan, the ancestral seat of the House of Suren, (Note: This is also the House in which the Parthian General Surena originated from.) one of the seven Great Parthian Families of Iran (the Seven Parthian Clans). This indicates that the House of Rostam, in the epic, is directly parallel to a Parthian noble house. Rostam's dragon banner was also directly influenced by the Parthians.

Historian Dariush Zolfaghari has argued that the Shahnameh presents warfare not merely as a struggle over territory, but also as a struggle over the survival of Iranian cultural identity and heritage. He emphasizes Rostam as being a key character who is depicted as a military champion and as a protector of Iranian cultural continuity. His character is partially responsible for symbolically safeguarding Persian identity, customs, and political legitimacy. The epic is seen as both a literary work and a cultural model for preserving national heritage during and after a war, with Rostam playing a key part in this analysis.

== Family tree ==
Garshasp
Nariman
Sām
Zāl
Shaghad

Mardas
Zahhak
Mehrab Kaboli	Sindukht
Rudaabeh
Rostam	Tahmineh
Faramarz	Sohrab

== Gallery ==
Mughal era manuscripts depicting Rostam's seven labours and other feats:

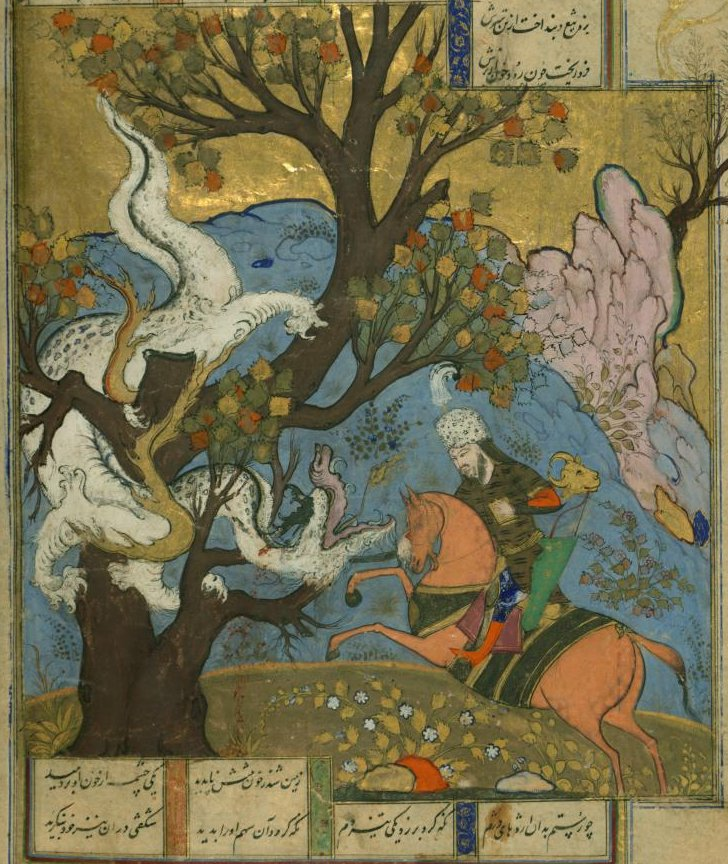
The third feat of Rostam's seven labours: Rostam kills a dragon.

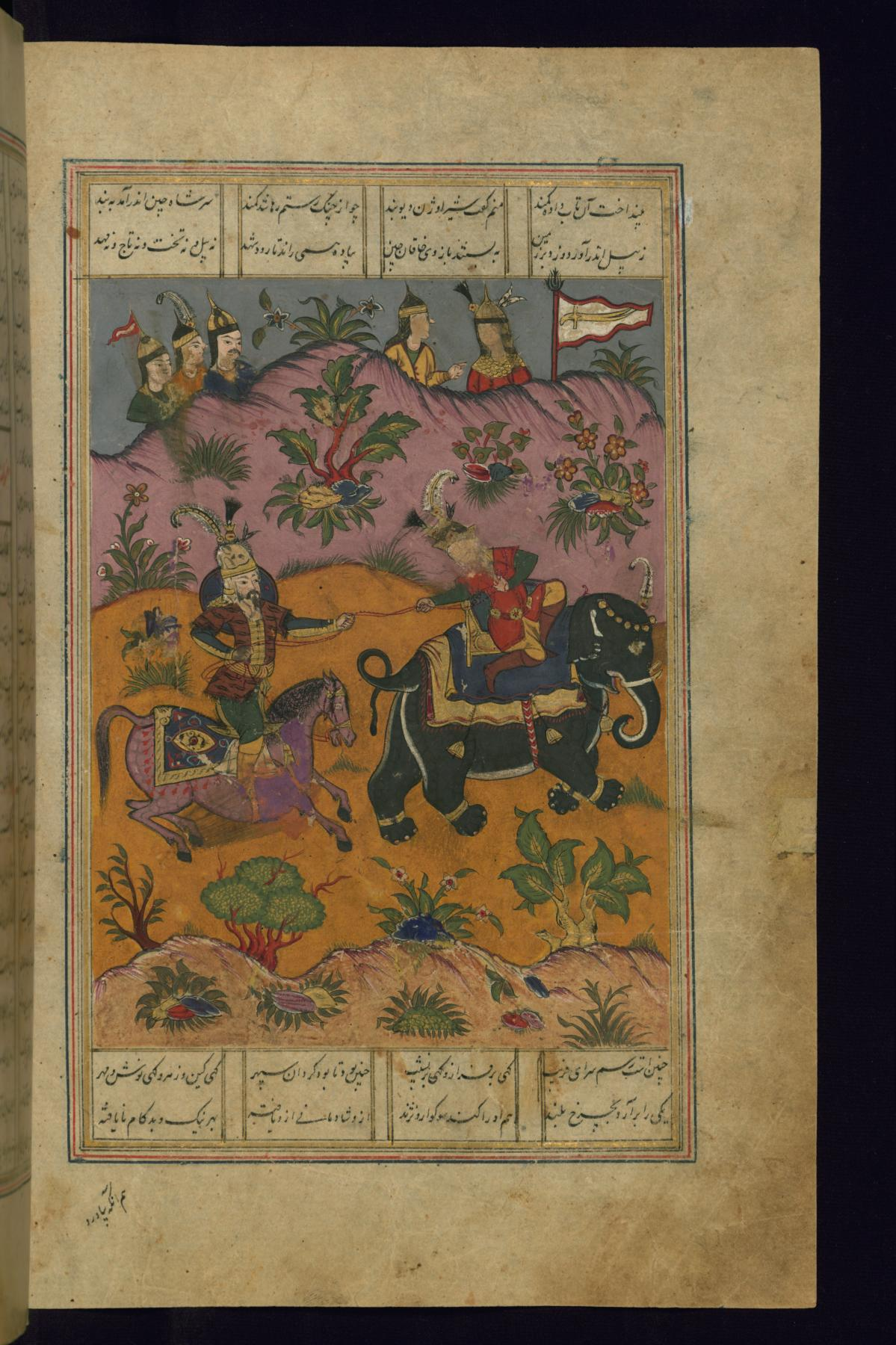
Rustam drags the Khaqan of China from his elephant.

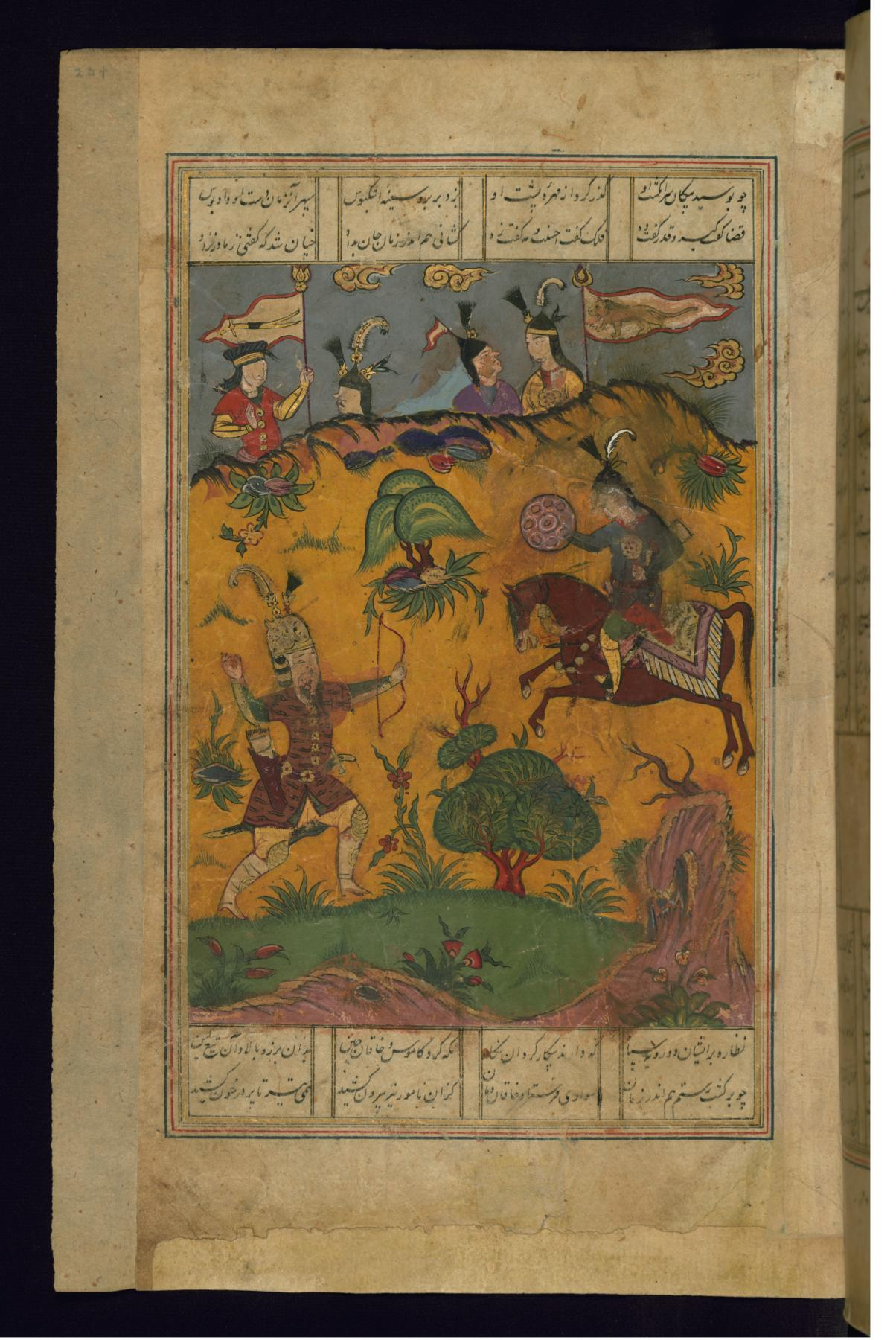
Rustam shoots Ashkabus.

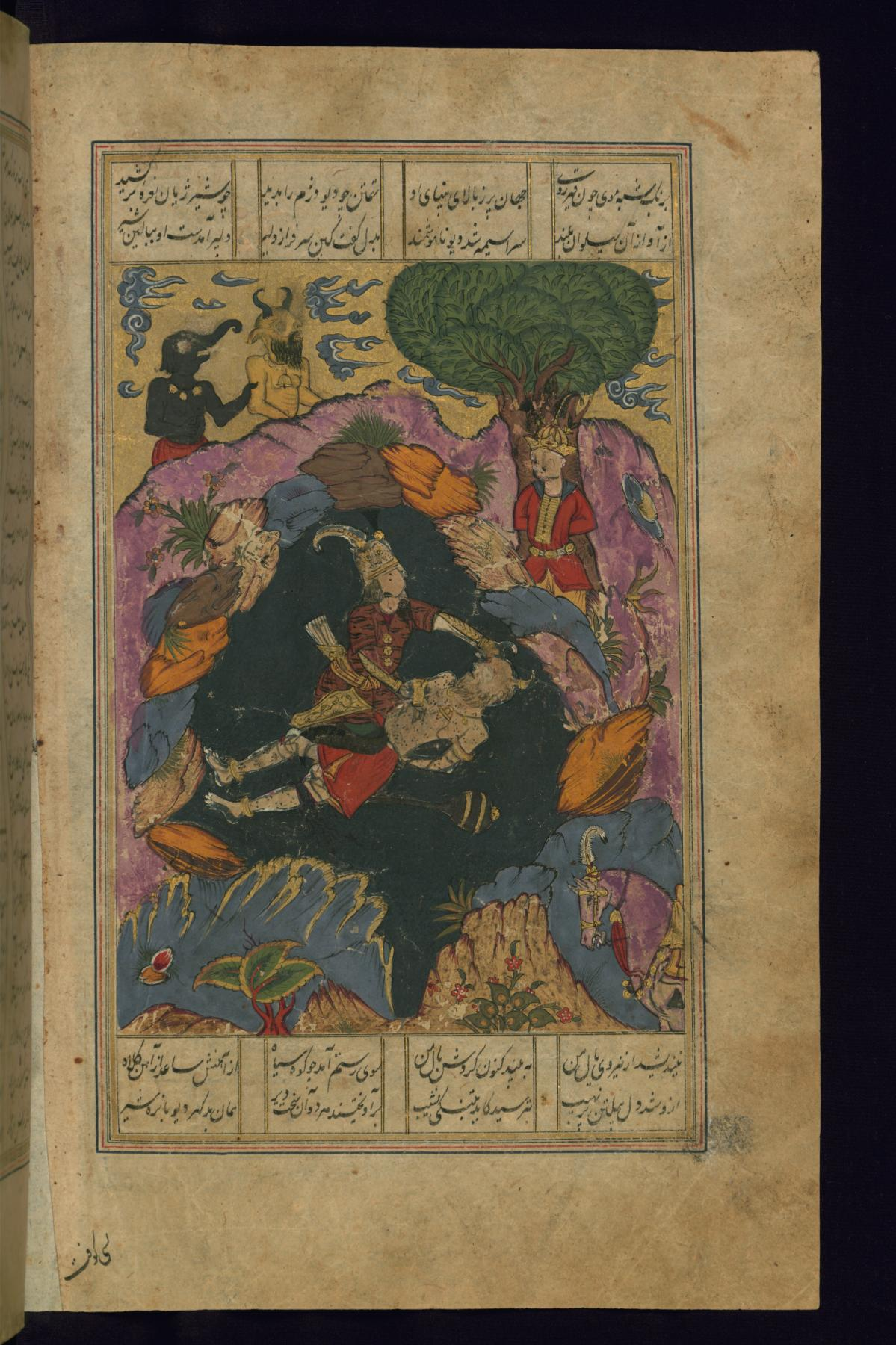
The final feat of Rostam's seven labours: Rostam kills the White Demon.

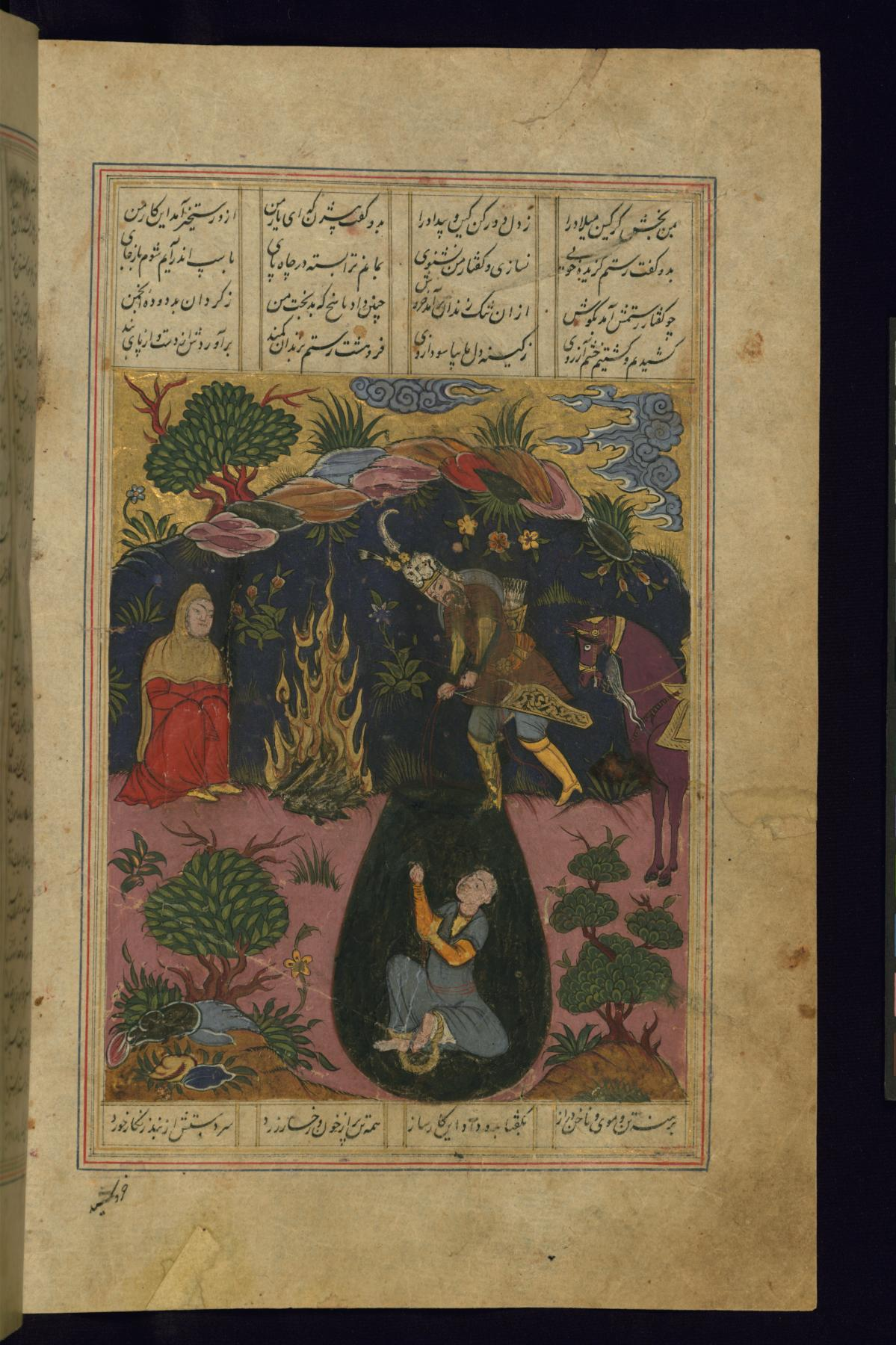
Rustam rescues Bizhan from the pit.

== In popular and traditional culture ==
The word 'Rustam' is synonymous with physical prowess, especially for wrestlers in Persian, Urdu, Hindi and Persianate cultures generally. For example, The Great Gama was popularly referred to as Rustam-e-Hind, or "Rustam of India".

Rustam remains a popular name in Persianate cultures from Turkey to India.

In Afghanistan, there is a Dari proverb, "“Rostam’s name is better than Rostam.” Edward Zellem explained, “This proverb is used when a person’s name or reputation is better than his actual abilities”.

== See also ==
- Shahnameh
- List of Shahnameh characters
- Rostam and Sohrab
- Battle of Rostam and Esfandiyār
- Rostam and Shaghad
- Rostam's Seven Labours
- Zal and Rudabeh
- Garshaspname
- Banu Goshasp
- Naqsh-e Rostam
- Rostami (place)
- Rostami (surname)
- The Knight in the Panther's Skin
- Nadr ibn al-Harith - Contemporary of Muhammad, told stories about Rostam and Esfandiyar.

== Sources ==
- Gazerani, Saghi (2015). The Sistani Cycle of Epics and Iran's National History: On the Margins of Historiography. BRILL. pp. 1–250. ISBN 9789004282964.
- Rezakhani, Khodadad (2017). "East Iran in Late Antiquity". ReOrienting the Sasanians: East Iran in Late Antiquity. Edinburgh University Press. pp. 1–256. ISBN 9781474400305. JSTOR 10.3366/j.ctt1g04zr8. (registration required)
