= Esfandiyār =

Persian mythological hero of the epic poem Shahnameh

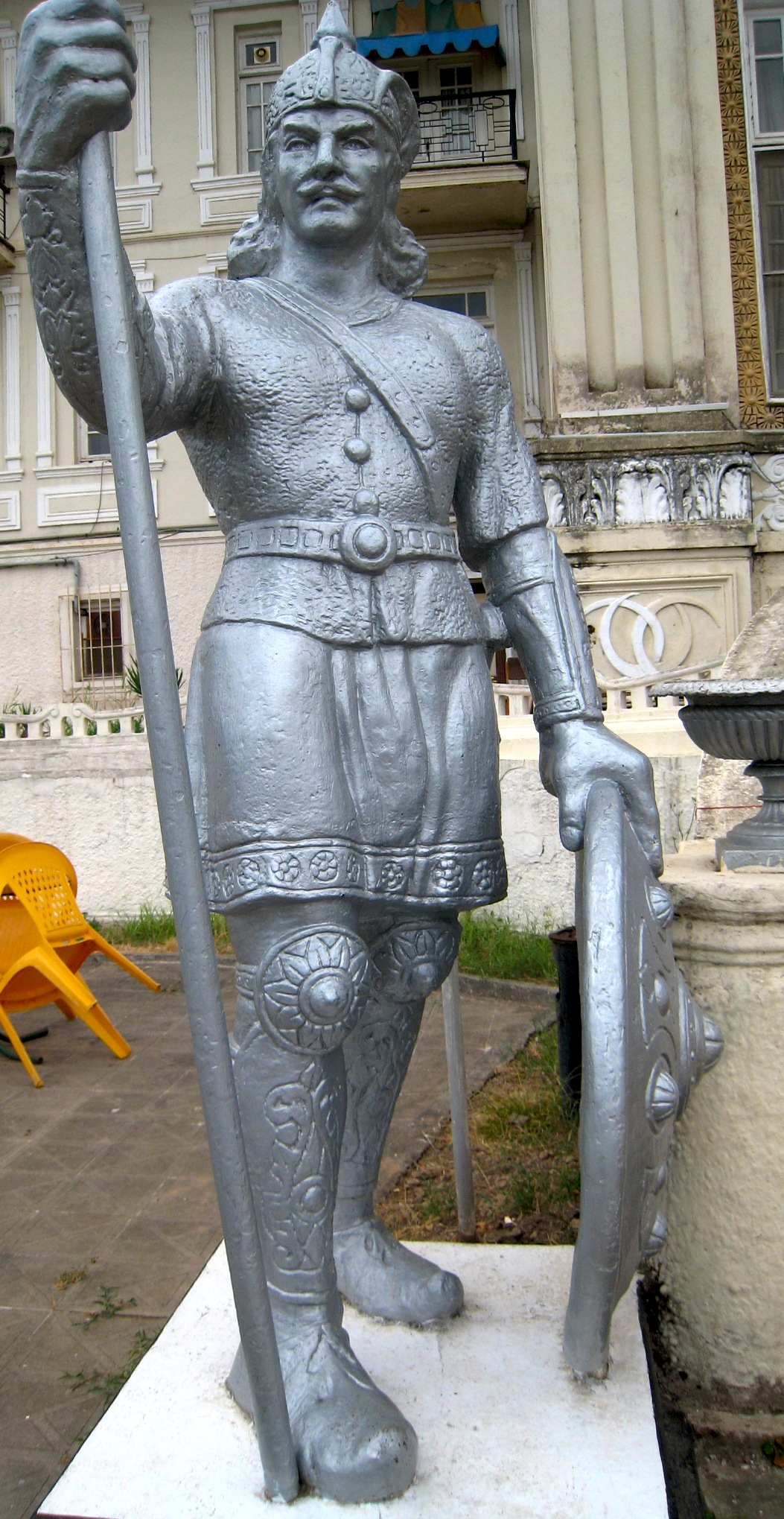
Statue of Esfandiyār in Ramsar, Iran.

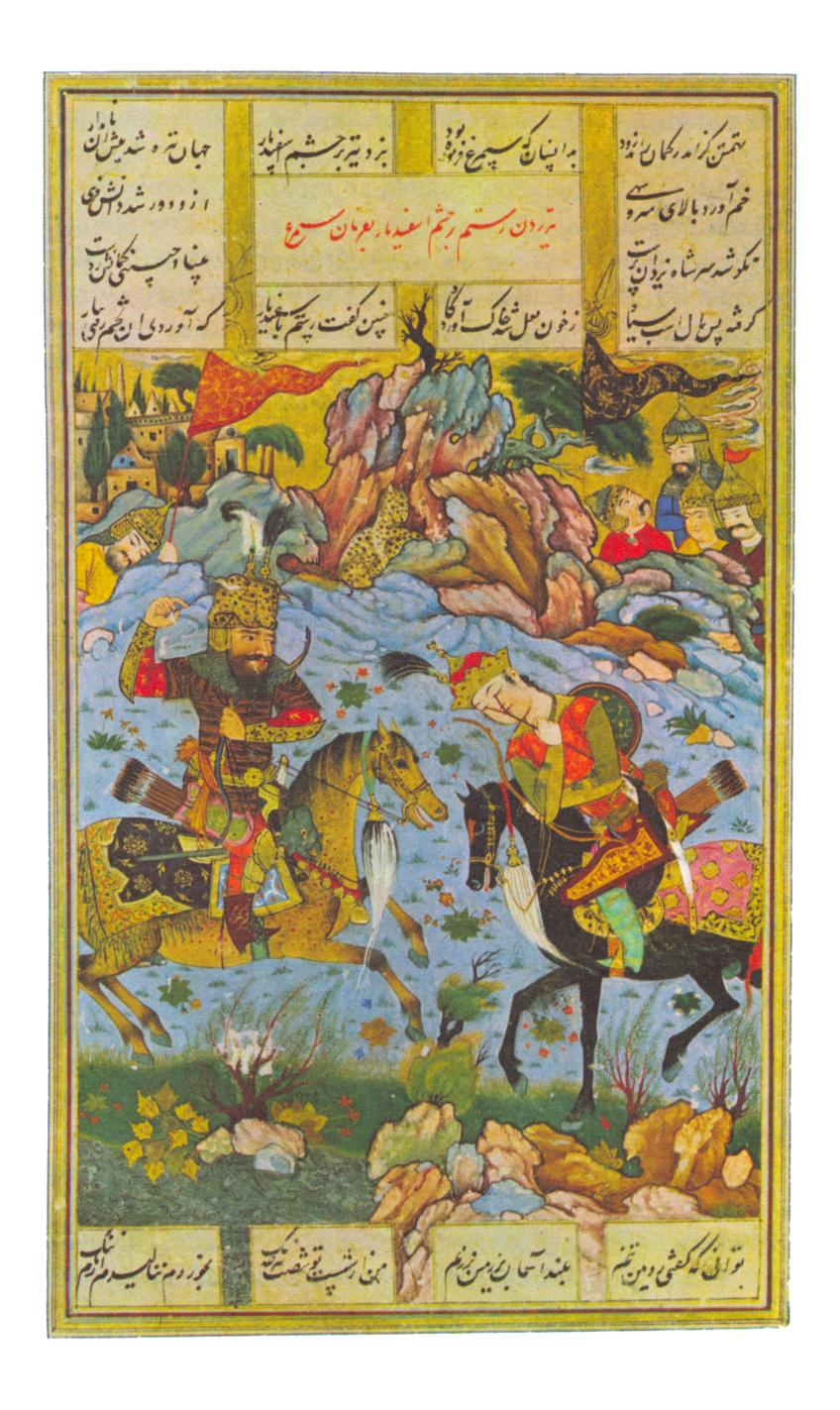
Rostam and Esfandiyar

Esfandiyār (Note: Also spelled Espandiyār Avestan: Spəntōδāta- Middle Persian: Spandadāt Persian: اسفندیار) is a legendary Iranian hero and one of the characters of Ferdowsi's Shahnameh (The Book of Kings). He was the son and the crown prince of the Kayanian King Goshtasp and Queen Katāyoun, the rulers of Bactria. He was the grandchild of Kay Lohrasp.

Esfandiyār is best known for the tragic story of a battle with Rostam described in Ferdowsi's epic Shahnameh. It is one of the longest episodes in Shahnameh and is one of its literary highlights.

== Etymology ==
The Persian word 'Sepandiār' is derived from Middle Persian: Spandadāt or 'Spandyat' (the variance is due to ambiguities inherent in the Pahlavi script), which in turn derives from Avestan: Spəntōδāta- meaning "Given by Spenta Armaiti" which is later personified as sepandarmaz (سپندارمذ), but in original Avestan meant "creative harmonious thought" (usually referring to the physical laws of nature), but in time had come to mean holy or "Given by (the) holy" (See Amesha Spenta for other meanings of spenta).

== In the Shahnameh ==
According to the epic Shahnameh, Esfandiyār was the Crown Prince and a Divine Warrior of ancient Iran who supported the prophet Zarathustra, enabling him to spread the religion of Zoroastrianism. He also fought against many apostates and enemies of Zarathustra to do so. In return, Zarathustra gave Esfandiyār a chain and armor from Heaven. The armor made him invulnerable and the chain had the power to bind anyone, even a demon or evil magician, making them unable to escape. Zarathustra also gave a Divine blessing to the prince and declared that anyone who spills the blood of Esfandiyār shall suffer a cursed life of bad omens until the day he dies, and even after death would be condemned to hell.

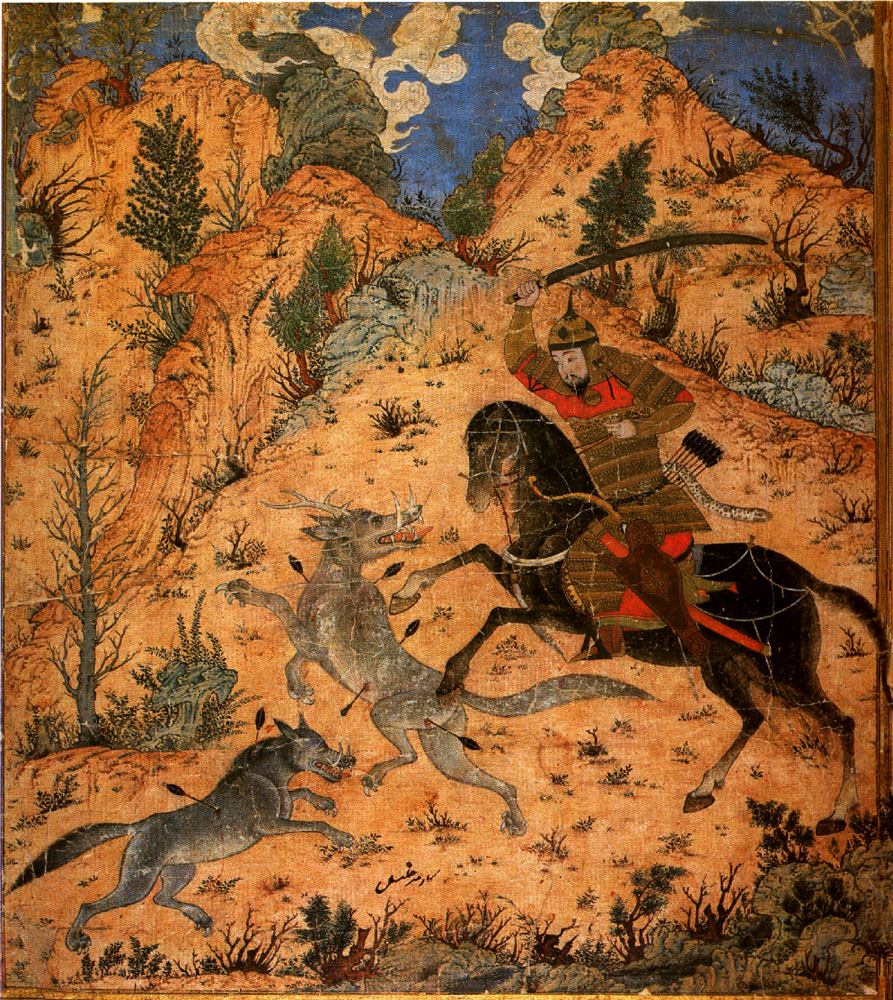
Esfandiyar fighting with wolves.

Esfandiyār's father, Goshtasp, had promised to give him the throne if he manages to repel an invasion in far-off provinces. Esfandiyār successfully carries out the order. Upon his return, Goshtasp informs him that during his absence the king of Turan: Arjāsp had rebelled and attacked Iran's capital and abducted Esfandiyār's two sisters. Goshtasp sends Esfandiyār on another mission to suppress the rebellion and retrieve the abducted princesses.

Esfandiyār sets out in haste passing through a difficult and dangerous path with 7 different battles which would be known later as 7 labors of Esfandiyār. These are:

1. Slaying two monstrous wolves.

2. Slaying two man-eating lions.

3. Slaying a Dragon.

4. Killing a wicked enchantress.

5. Fighting and killing a Simurgh and its two offspring.

6. Braving a three-day-long storm.

7. Crossing a desert.

Esfandiyār then successfully infiltrates the Fortress of Arjāsp known as Roin Dej. (lit. Invincible Fortress) Esfandiyār then kills Arjaasb, rescues his sisters and conquers the fortress. Upon Esfandiyār's return to Iran, Goshtasp, who did not want to part with his throne, hedges once again.

Although Goshtasp is aware of a prediction that foretells the death of Esfandiyār at the hand of Rostam, he compels the young hero to go and bring the aging Rostam in chains for his arrogance and disrespect toward the king, promising that upon completing this mission he will give the throne to Esfandiyār and retire. Esfandiyār initially protests, reminding his father of Rostam's fame, great age, and services to the dynasty, but eventually complies with his father's wishes and sets out towards Rostam's home.

Upon reaching the home of Rostam, Esfandiyār delivers the message, but Rostam refuses to be put in chains, only agreeing to accompany the young prince to his father's palace. Esfandiyār insists, but Rostam, making numerous other concessions, stands his ground and the two eventually meet in single combat. In the subsequent battle, the invincible Esfandiyār is unaffected by Rostam's blows while Rostam is seriously wounded by Esfandiyār's arrows, which had diamond arrowheads and could easily pierce through Rostam's armor. Pleading respite to dress his wounds, Rostam withdraws.

Rostam's father Zāl who was raised by the legendary bird Simurgh (apparently there were two different Simurghs in the Shahnameh, one which is slain in 7 labours of Esfandiyār and another which raised Zāl and lived in the mountains of Iran) summons the Simurgh by burning a feather given to him by the Simurgh herself to ask help for curing his son. Simurgh benevolently cures both Rostam and his horse Rakhsh who was also wounded by Esfandiyār's arrows. Rostam then learns from the Simurgh that the only weapon that can affect Esfandiyār is a special double-headed arrow, made from the branch of a tamarisk tree near the Persian Gulf which must be shot through his eyes. According to scholar Hamid Mahamedi, the Simorgh makes a prophetic declaration to Rostam:

The Simorgh, on advising Rostam not to seek to kill Esfandiyār, warns him thus: "Fortune will sacrifice any man who spills the blood of the hero Esfandiyār; as long as life shall last in that man he will find no deliverance from torment nor will his prosperity endure." In the Davāni story, the Simorgh tells Rostam that he will live for another five hundred years, but if he kills Esfandiyār, he will outlive Esfandiyār by only one year.

Simurgh also warns Rostam about the fate that awaits the killer of Esfandiyār and asks Rostam to consider surrendering to the Prince, and since he is a divine prince there would be no shame in surrendering to him. But Rostam refuses to accept either the shame of surrendering or being chained by anyone. Upon making this decision, Simurgh carries Rostam to the tamarisk tree, where he fashions the double-headed arrow with a feather of Simurgh and a twig of the tamarisk tree. When the battle resumes the next morning, Esfandiyār is blinded by a shot through the eye.

Before dying, Esfandiyār tells Rostam to take his son Bahman under his wing and not to blame himself: it was the false promise of his father and the Arrow of Simurgh that killed him. Esfandiyār tells Rostam that Goshtasp should be guilty as the real murderer. After his death, Esfandiyār is put into a box and sent to Goshtasp.

=== Analysis ===
According to historian Masoumeh Sadeghi, Esfandiyār has direct parallels to the character Achilles in the Iliad of Homer. Ferdowsi was influenced by the Iliad in certain stories of the Shahnameh, which is especially shown in the story of Rostam and Esfandiyār. Both characters are in a conflictual storyline with their respective kings. Esfandiyār desires taking his father's throne with the whole kingdom, and believes he is entitled to it, while Achilles is resentful towards Agamemnon because he kidnapped his beloved woman. Both characters constantly complain about their respective king's unkindness towards them. Both characters also show characteristics of invulnerability: the Avestan tradition states Esfandiyār is washed in Holy Water by Zoroaster, making him immortal. Achilles is also dipped in a river of immortality which made his entire body, except his heel, immortal.

== See also ==
- Battle of Rostam and Esfandiyār
- Esfandiyār's Seven Labors
- The heel of Achilles
- The shoulder of Sigurd (Siegfried)
- The thighs of Duryodhana
- Nadr ibn al-Harith - Contemporary of Muhammad, told stories about Rostam and Esfandiyar.
