= Rakhsh =

Stallion in Persian mythology

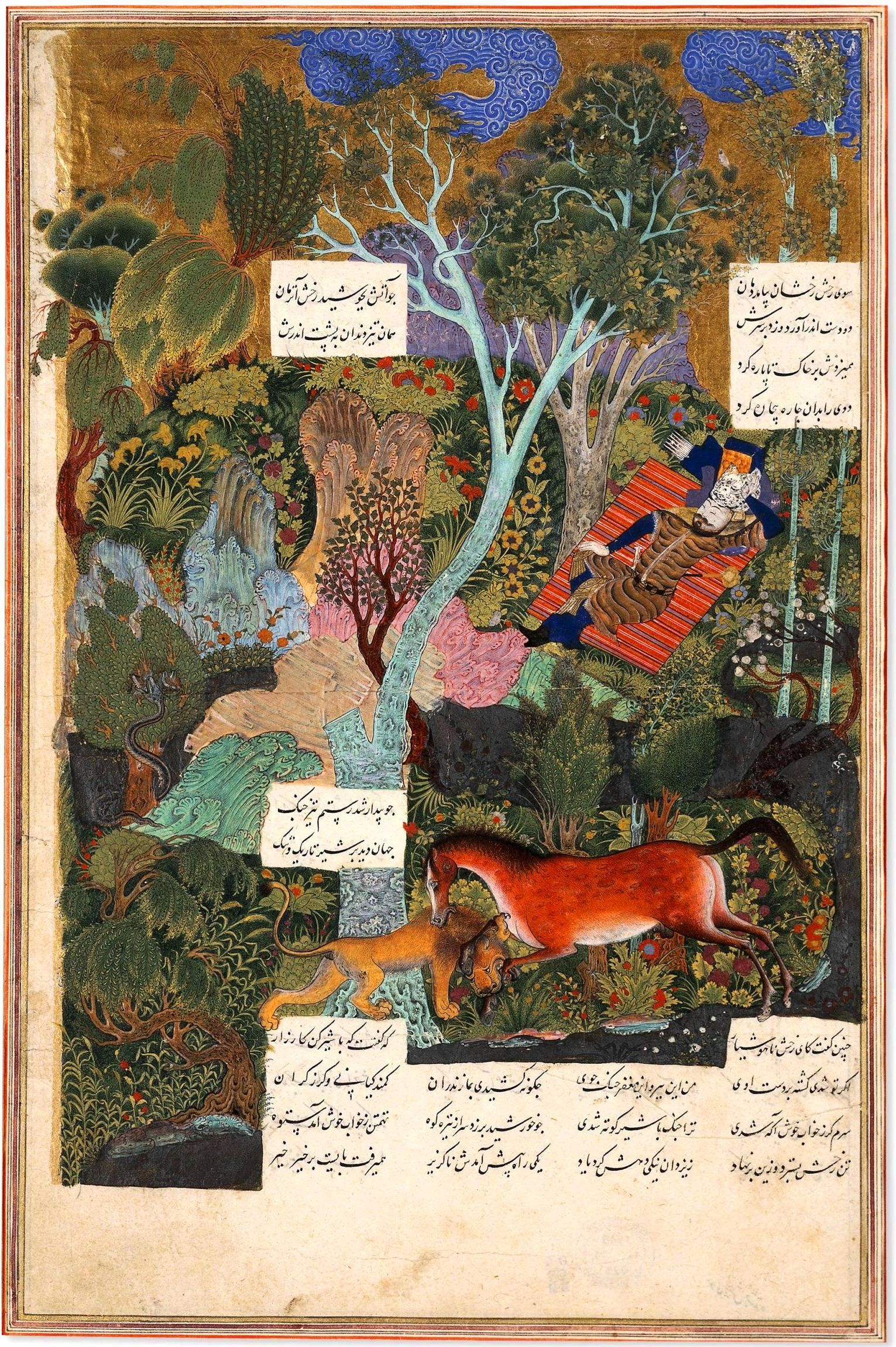
- Rostam sleeps, while his horse Rakhsh fends off a lion. 1515–22

Creature information
- Grouping: Mythical creature
- Folklore: Persian mythology

Origin
- Country: Iran

Rakhsh (Persian: رخش, lit. 'Luminous') is the stallion of the legendary hero Rostam in the Persian national epic Shahnameh by the poet Ferdowsi.

Rakhsh's colour is described as "rose leaves that have been scattered upon a saffron ground" and it is first noticed by Rostam amongst the herds of horses brought over from Zabulistan and Kabul. In this first encounter, Rakhsh is described as a mighty colt with the chest and shoulders of a lion and it appears to have the strength of an elephant. He is highly intelligent and his loyalty is legendary. No one but Rostam ever rides Rakhsh, and Rakhsh recognizes no one but Rostam as his master. Also, he is the only horse ever that Rostam could ride, since Rostam's great strength and weight would kill other horses.

Due to the divine favor protecting Rostam, Rakhsh lives an unusually long life. Rostam and Rakhsh both die due to the treachery of Rostam's half-brother, Shaghad.

Raḵšā (Rakhsha) in Aramaic means horse.

Many hippologues consider Rakhsh to be the famed Nisean breed.

== See also ==
- List of fictional horses
