= Faramarz =

Persian mythological hero of the epic poem Shahnameh

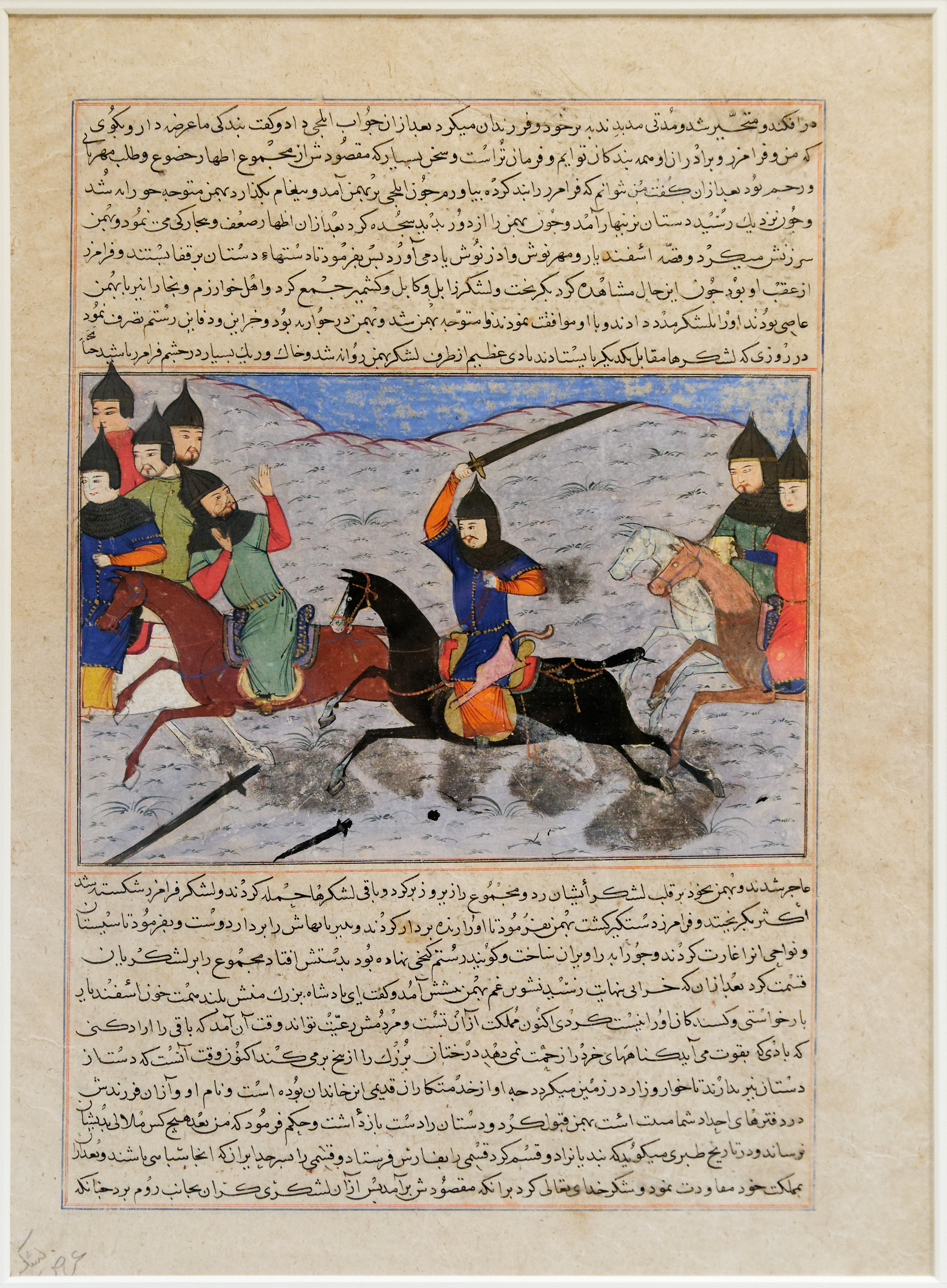
Kay Bahman's attack to Sistan and defeat Faramarz in the book Jami al-tawarikh, written by Hafiz-i Abru. (This book is held in Metropolitan Museum of Art)

Faramarz (Persian: فرامرز) is an Iranian legendary hero (pahlavan) in Ferdowsi's Shahnameh ("Book of Kings"). He was son of Rostam and at last killed by Kay Bahman.

The book Faramarz-nama, written about a hundred years after Shahnameh, is about Faramarz and his wars. Also he is mentioned in other ancient books like Borzu Nama.

== See also ==
- Shahnameh
- Faramarz nama
