= Shaghad =

Character in Iranian mythology

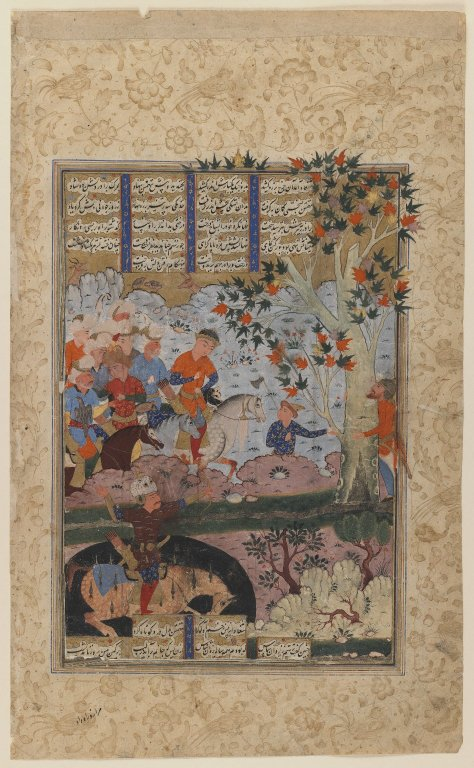
The Death of Rostam in the well, and Rostam's killing of Shaghad while he his hiding behinde a tree

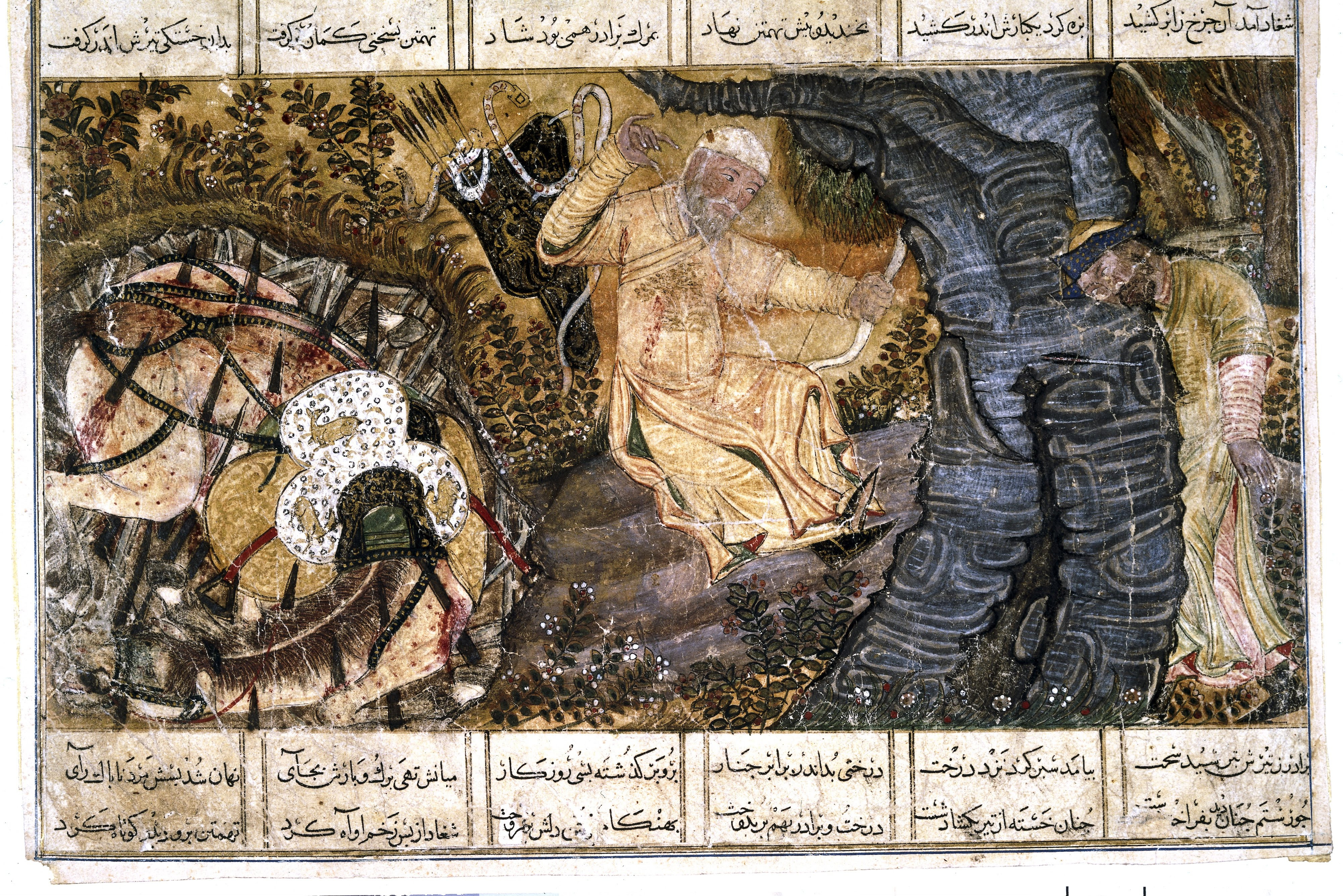
The death of the hero Rustam and his horse Rakhsh

Shaghad or Shoghad (Persian: شغاد) was the half-brother of Rostam, the mighty Iranian hero of the Shahnameh. He treacherously killed Rostam by dropping him into a pit full of swords or other sharp objects.

== Plot ==
Shaghad has always been jealous of Rostam's high status. At long last he finds an opportunity to carry out his evil intention. The King of Kabulestan and Shaghad together conspire against Rostam. They dig a deep well on the way of Rostam and his horse Rakhsh, and set poisoned spears at the bottom of the well. Rostam and Rakhsh fall into the well. Nearing his end, Rostam decides to get revenge. He asks Shaghad for a bow and two arrows. Shaghad agrees to fulfill the last wish of his brother. As soon as Shaghad gives Rostam the bow and arrows, he starts running away. Rostam shoots an arrow through the trunk of a tree at Shaghad and slays him. Then, he himself dies.

== Family tree ==
Sām
Zāl
Shaghad

Mehrab Kaboli
Rudaabeh
Rostam
