= Sām =

Shahnameh character

Sām (Persian: سام), also transliterated Saam, is a mythical hero of ancient Persia, and an important character in the Shahnameh epic. He was the son of Nariman, grandson of Garshasp and father to Zāl. Disheartened by his son Zāl being born with white hair, he ordered that Zāl be left at the Alborz mountains which were home to the Simurgh. The Simurgh cared for the young Zāl until Sām was influenced by a dream to reunite with his son. Sām was Iran's champion during the rule of Fereydun, Manuchehr and Nowzar. He was appointed by Manuchehr to rule Zabulistan (Sistan), and then Mazandaran. After Manuchehr, because of Nowzar's corrupted and failed rulership, Iranian champions asked Sām to rule Iran. Sām did not accept; he supported Nowzar and advised him to follow Fereydun and Manuchehr. Sām returned to Mazandaran, and died soon after that. Afrasiab then attacked Zabulistan. In Shahnameh Saam is associated with strength, bravery, and nobility.

In Persian, based on the Dehkhoda Dictionary, Sām or Saam means Fire.
