= Zāl =

Legendary Iranian king

Pahlavan Zāl Father of Rostam
- زال
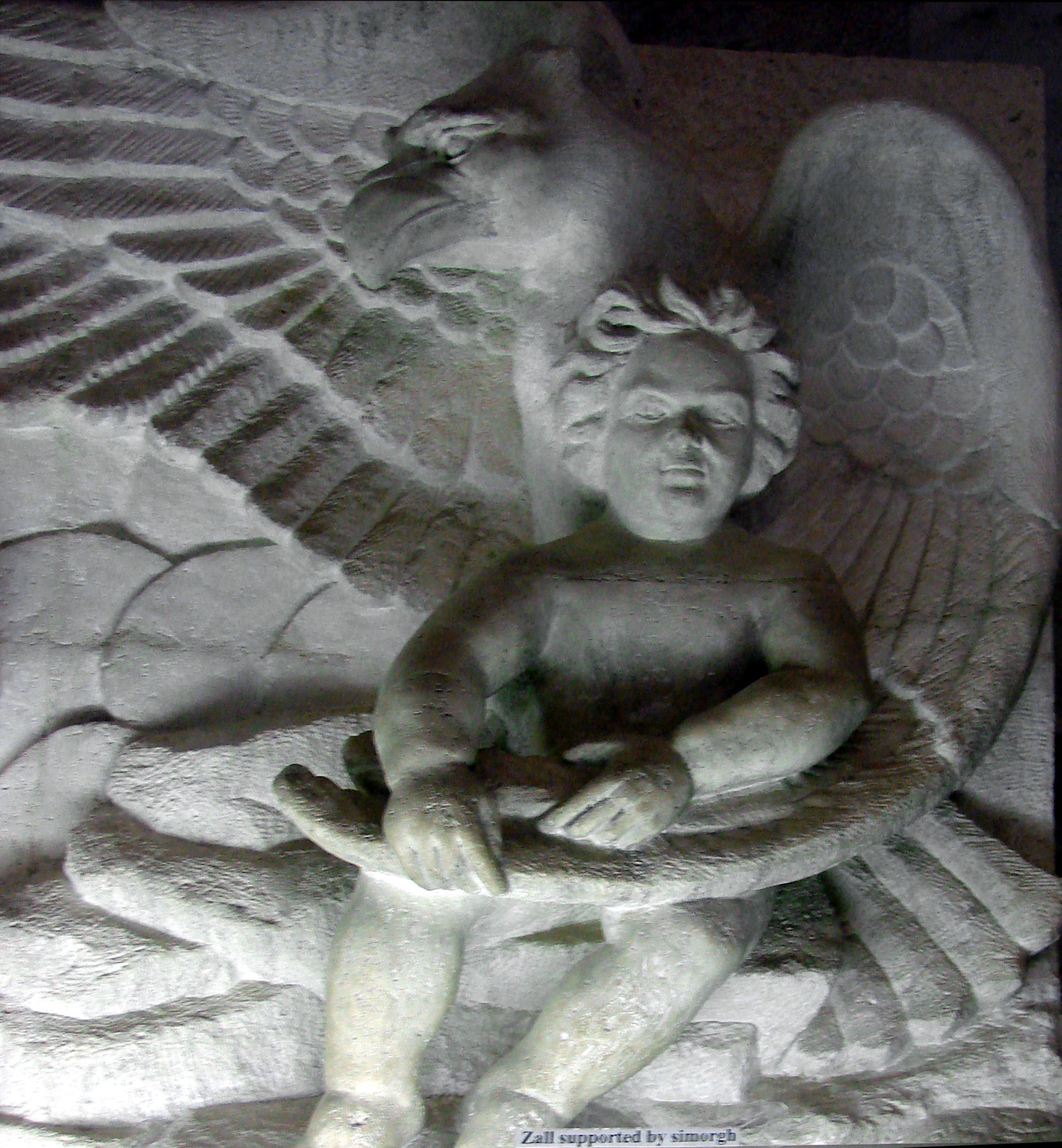
- Sculpture of the infant Zāl being saved by the simurgh, from the Tomb of Ferdowsi
- Born: Zabulistan (modern-day Afghanistan)
- Spouse: Rudaba
- Children: Rostam Zavara Shaghad
- Father: Sam
- Family: Sohrab (grandson)

Zāl (Persian: زال, pronounced [zɒːl]), alternatively spelled as Zaal, is a legendary Iranian king from Sistan, and is recognized as one of the greatest warriors of the Shahnameh epic. He is the father of the equally legendary Iranian hero, Rostam.

== Background ==
Zāl came from a family whose members were legendary warriors, who – for generations – served in the Persian army as great generals. His father, Sām and, later, his son, Rostam were also great heroes of Persia.

Zāl was born with white hair. Because of this, his parents called him Zāl. In the Persian language, zal refers to those who have albinism. Zāl was the son of Sām and the grandson of Nariman, both heroes of ancient Persia and protectors of "Land of Iran" (Iran-zamin). Because of his appearance, Zāl was rejected by his father, who blamed the evil spirit, Ahriman, for the appearance of his son. Zāl was abandoned when only an infant in the Alborz Mountain, which has the highest geographic peak in Iran. The mythical simurgh (a very large and wise bird which darkens the sky when flying, said to be related to the phoenix) found the baby and took him to her nest. After some time, passing caravans noticed a noble young man in the bird's nest, with a mountain of silver on his chest and a reed for a waist. Rumor of this remarkable presence finally reached Sam, who was encouraged by his wise men to hasten to the scene. There, looking up, he saw his son, but when he tried to climb toward him, he couldn't find a way to the lofty perch. He then prayed to God, asking for forgiveness and help. When the simurgh saw Sam, she knew that he had come for her charge. The devoted bird gave Zaal a feather, saying: "Burn this if ever you have need of me, and may your heart never forget your nurse, whose heart breaks for love of you."

The mighty and wise simurgh gave Zāl this one feather to burn when in trouble. She would appear as soon as the feathers were lit.

== Zal and Rudabeh ==
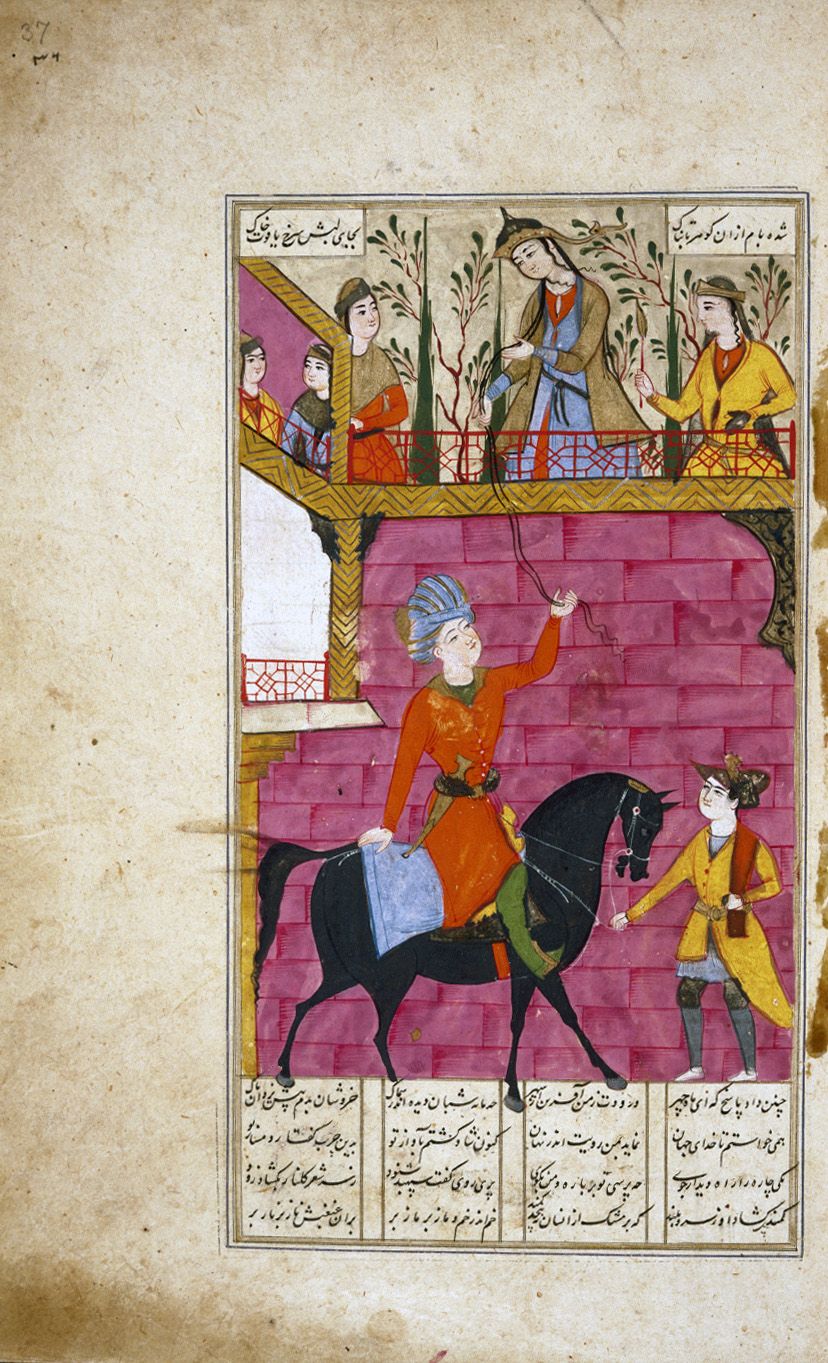
Zal meets Rudabeh.

After reuniting with his son, Sam made every effort to redress past wrongs. Manuchehr, too, gave the young man due regard. When Sam went off to wage war in Mazandaran, Zal, recommended by the elders, was given Sam's kingdom.

Setting forth on a royal progress to view his eastern provinces, Zal at every stage held court and called for wine, harp, and minstrelsy. In Kabul, Mehrab, a vassal king descended from the evil Zahhak, paid homage with gifts of horses and slaves.

Learning of Rudabeh, Mehrab's beautiful daughter, Zal lost his heart in love. But the affair was to progress slowly. Once even, Zal came near Rudabeh's palace where Rudabeh gave her tresses to Zal as a rope. However, he had brought his own, with which he scaled the walls. In a heat of passion, the lovers had sex with each other and Rudabeh conceived. When her father learned of this, he was outraged.

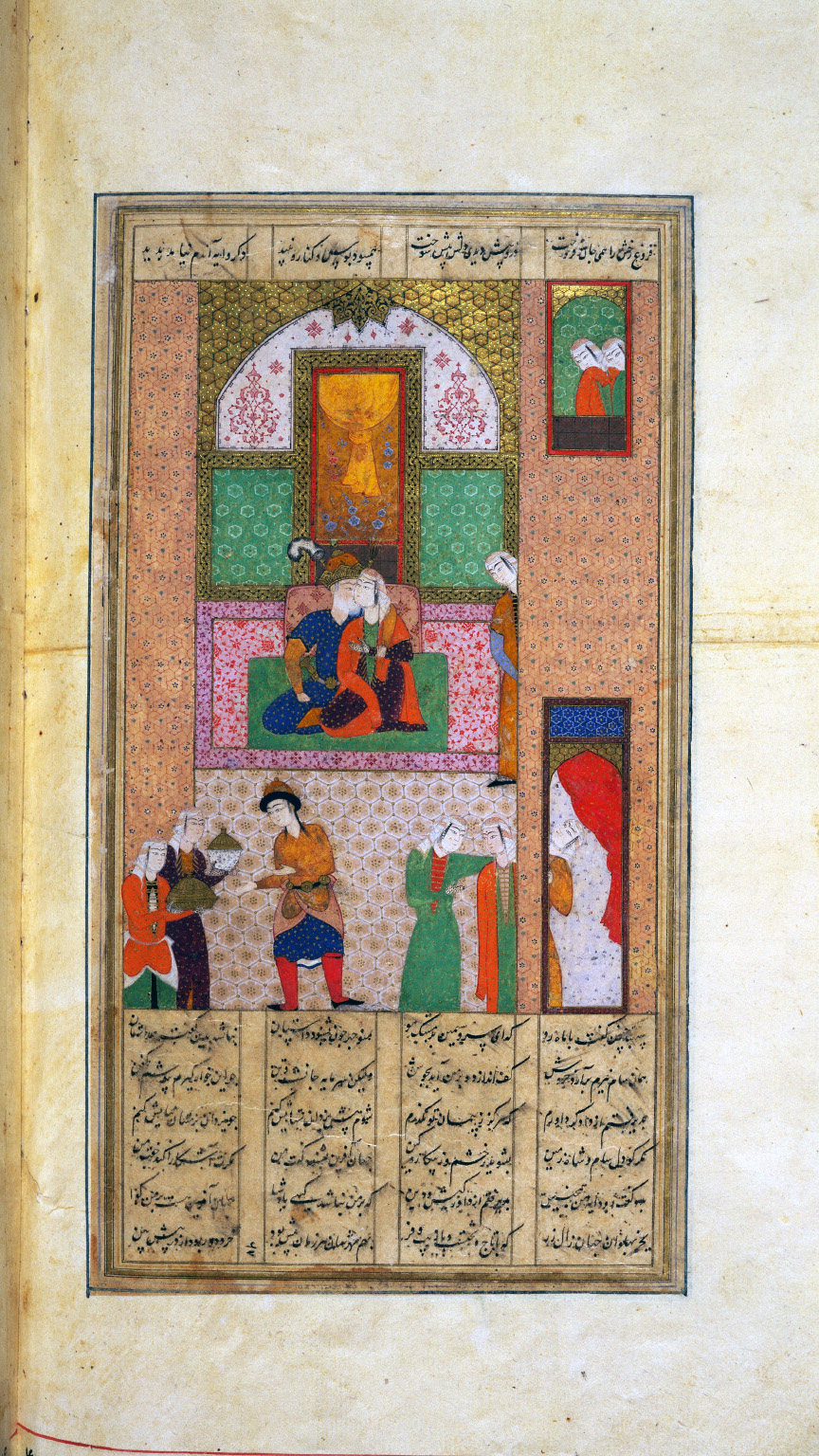
Zal's marriage ceremony

Zal rightly feared that his father and Manuchehr would disapprove of his marrying a descendant of Zahhak, and while Mehrab generally approved of the young prince, some of Zal's actions made him bristle. Zal accordingly wrote a letter to his father and requested him to agree to his marriage, reminding him of the oath he had made to fulfill all his wishes.

Sam and the Mubeds, knowing that Rudabeh's father, chief of Kabul, was Babylonian from the family of Zahhak, did not approve of the marriage.

Finally, the ruler Sam referred the question to astrologers, to know whether or not the marriage between Zal and Rudabeh would be prosperous. He was informed that the offspring of Zal and Rudabeh would be the conqueror of the world. When Zal arrived at the court of Manuchehr, he was instructed by the Emperor to showcase his skills. Zal was asked highly difficult questions and riddles by the emperor's wisest men, which Zal proceeded to answer correctly.

The emperor then held a tournament for Zal to prove himself against the royal warriors. Zal proved himself unparalleled in marksmanship (archery) and in fighting from horseback. The great warrior hurled his javelin with such strength that he was able to impale three shields at once. Finally, Zal succeeded in defeating Menuchehr's warriors and lifted an enemy warrior off his horse with complete ease. Impressed, Menuchehr gave his approval of Zal and Rudabeh's marriage.

After a while, the marriage of Zal and Rudabeh was celebrated in Kabul, where they first met each other. Rostam, the great Persian hero, was born from their wedlock.

Zal used one of the feathers he received from the simurgh when his wife Rudabeh was in a difficult labor, and it looked like she would lose her life as well as the unborn baby. The simurgh appeared and instructed him to run a feather across his wife's belly like a knife. That is how Rostam was born.

== Later life ==
Zal brought up and trained Rostam. He had another son with Rudabeh, named Zawara. He sent Rostam on many campaigns. Zal later ruled Zabulistan and served as a general and advisor to the king. He became famous for his military victories against the Turanians and against many barbarians.

Zal lived for more than three centuries, outliving his wife, Rudabeh. He sired a son, Shagad, with a servant woman. Although he was warned by counselors that the child was evil, Zal refused to abandon, lest he commit the same mistake his father, Sam, did.

When Esfandiyar challenged Rostam, Zal warned his son not to fight, as he was aware that Esfandiyar's murderer would be doomed. When Rostam returned, grievously wounded, Zal healed him and summoned the Simurgh, to find out a way to defeat Esfandiyar.

Later, Zal lived to see his sons kill each other, and the fall of his family. Esfandiyar's son, Bahman, avenged his father's death by invading Zabulistan. Zal was too old to fight, and Bahman threw the ageing king in prison, and took his treasures. Bahman then however released him after own uncle, Pashotan, intervened on Zal's behalf. Bahman later withdrew to Iran, and Zal once again ruled as king. The great king died later of natural causes, and his dynasty splintered.

== Family tree ==
Zahhak
Sām	Mehrab Kaboli	Sindukht
Zāl	Rudabeh
Shaghad	Rostam

== See also ==
- Ferdosi
- Shahnameh
- Simurgh
- Zal and Rudabeh

== Sources ==
- Kia, Mehrdad (2016). The Persian Empire: A Historical Encyclopedia (Vol. 1). ABC-CLIO. ISBN 978-1610693912.
- Shahbazi, A. S.; Cristoforetti, Simone (2009). "ZĀL". Encyclopaedia Iranica.
