= Mazandarani mythology =

Mazandaran is a region of north-central Iran inhabited by the Mazanderani people. It's located between the Alborz Mountains, Hyrcanian forests and Caspian Sea. Mazanderani mythology is based on the Mazanderani people's oral tradition of various folk characters and tales.

== Folk characters ==
=== Bom Sari Kija ===
Bom Sari Kija (translation: "the girl on the roof") was a malign supernatural female, in function somewhat resembling a lulu khorkhore, who was used to frighten children into good behaviour: in the folklore of Mazandaran, it was said that children who behaved badly would be abducted by this being.

=== Dawalpa ===
Dawalpa was an evil being which captured people by winding its flexible, leathery, strap-like legs around their necks, shoulders or waists. Such captives would then be enslaved; forced, on pain of being clawed or half-strangled, to carry the demon around on their backs until they died of exhaustion - at which point the monster would be obliged to seek a fresh victim. This being is best known outside Iran as the Old Man of the Sea (Šayk al-Baḥr) as a result of the popularity of translations of the tales recounting the voyages of Sinbad the Sailor. One of Sinbad's voyages features both the noxious entity and the traditional means of defeating him - namely making him drunk/ataxic enough to be dislodged (and preferably killed) by his unfortunate victim.

=== Reera ===
Reera was a beautiful fairy woman believed to have haunted the Hyrcanian forests.

=== Mina and the Panther ===
The Legend of Mina and the Panther in Kandolus:

The story of Mina and the Panther is a realistic legend from Kandolus, Mazandaran, about a panther that falls in love with the voice of a girl named Mina.

Mina, an orphan with striking red eyes, lived alone in a cottage that still stands today as a tourist attraction. She had a melodious voice and would sing while collecting firewood in the forest. A panther, enchanted by her voice, followed her scent to her home. One night, it climbed onto her roof, and when Mina saw it, she fainted. Over time, she overcame her fear, and a unique friendship formed between them. The panther even helped her gather wood.

As their bond deepened, the villagers noticed the mysterious nightly visits and the panther peeking through Mina's window. When Mina was invited to a wedding in a neighboring village, she feared the panther would follow her. As expected, it tracked her scent but was attacked by dogs and later shot by the wedding guests.

Hearing of the panther's injury, Mina was devastated. She locked herself in her home all winter. Then, one misty spring day, she walked into the forest and was never seen again. Some believe the panther survived and took her into the wild.

The legend endures in Kandolus, where Mina's house remains, and a statue of Mina and the panther has been erected, keeping their story alive. ‌

== Mazandaran in the Shahnameh ==
Mazandaran is the abode of great Divs in the Shahanameh. Devils with the title: Div-e Sepid, Akvan Div, and Arzhang Div have been mentioned as Shah of Mazandaran. In Mazandaran province today, there are places named Div Asiyab, Div Cheshmeh, Div Kela, and Div Hamam.

The location of Mazandaran should not be confused with Mazandaran province, but it may have been a small area in this province. Some scholars believe that Mazandaran was a region in India, others believe that Mazandaran is in the Levant or Egypt.

== See also ==
- Nowruz Eve among Mazandarani people
- Mazanderani dance
- Arash
