= Zal and Rudabeh =

Two characters in the Shanameh

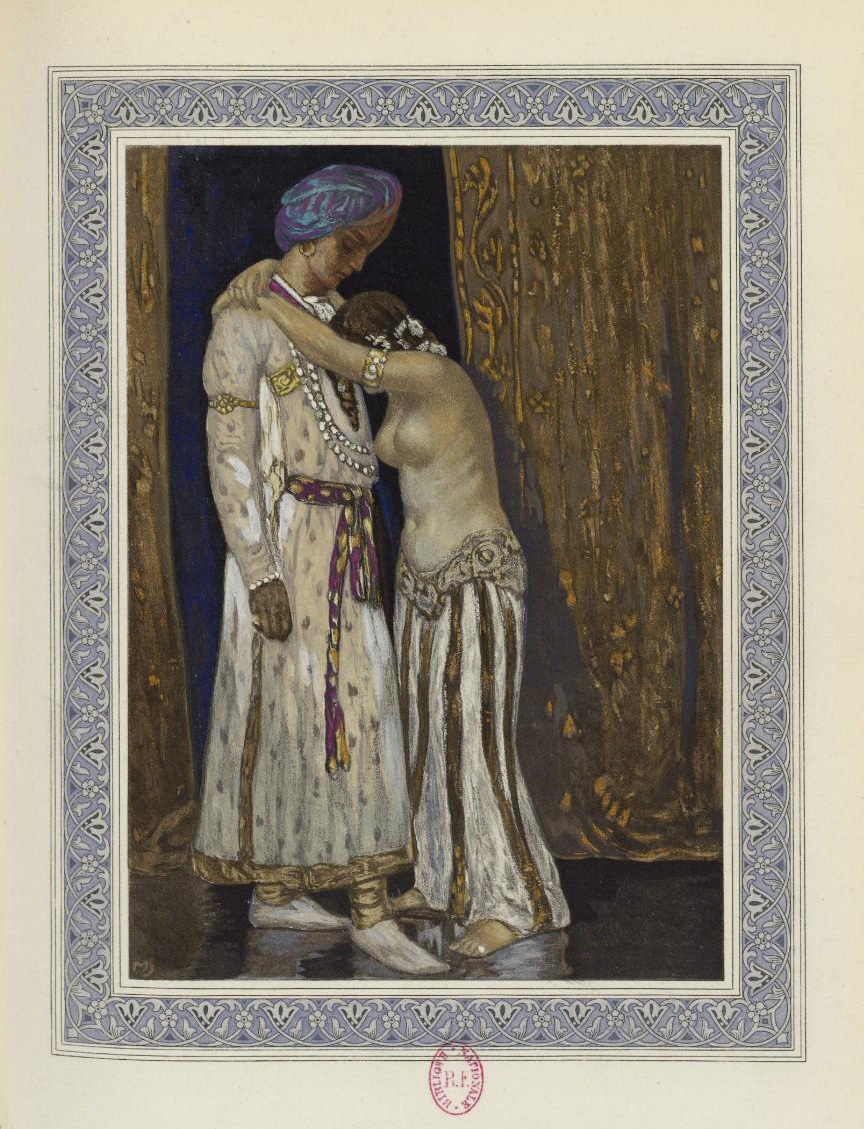
Zal and Rudabeh

Zāl and Rudaba (Persian: زال و رودابه) are the fate of two lovers in the Shahnameh. Zāl's love for Rudaba begins when he enters the suburbs of Kabul under the rule of the governor and hears Mehrab, the ruler of Kabul, have a daughter in the palace. Zal was ruling as a teenager in Zabol and was ordered by King Manuchehr of Iran. It was likely that the tax collection of the countries under the command of Iran was with Zal, and he camped with his battalion on the outskirts of Kabol.

== Dating Zal and Mehrab ==
Mehrab was the ruler of Kabul and the father of Rudaba. Mehrab paid his taxes to Sām as usual, but now his successor is Zal. Mehrab found that Zal had camped on the outskirts of the city, visiting in the morning but with an annual ransom. When Zal was aware of Mehrab's arrival, he accepted her and welcomed her into the Zuboliani tradition and placed her in a high position in parliament. When the party ended and a farewell to Mehrab, one of Zal's commanders told him that Mehrab had a beautiful daughter in the palace. And Zal fell in love with Mehrab's daughter.

Zal was upset at night, but the next day Mehrab went to Zal's tent again for lunch. Zal was very happy about the arrival of Mehrab. He asked Mehrab what he wanted to express, the throne, the royal seal, the sword or the crown. These compliments indicated a lover. And while he had not yet seen the Rudaba. In response, Mehrab said, "I only have one wish to be my guest. Despite the esoteric desire, Zal said Sam would not allow me to do so, and Mehrab left his tent discomfort.

== Zal and white hair ==
Mehrab returned to the palace and praised Zal's glamorous qualities for his wife Sindukht, but said the gladiator had only one flaw and that he had white hair. Rudaba heard the talk but fell in love with Zal's character and wished he could understand her better. Rudaba was restless like Zal and sent five of her slaves to Zal's tent to get to know each other. Eventually, one night Zal climbed the wall of the palace with Rudaba's escort, and the two lovers' wishes came true. But an acute problem later emerged, and it was the Iran king's opposition to their marriage.

== Sources ==
- Ferdowsi Shahnameh. From the Moscow version. Mohammed Publishing. ISBN 964-5566-35-5
