= Nowruz Eve among Mazandarani people =

Tabarian New Year's eve

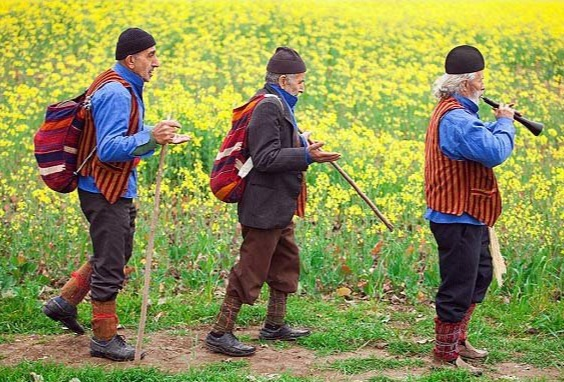
Nowruz eve among Mazanderani people

The Tabarian New Year, or Neowrez, occurs in the pintek days of the Tabarian Calendar.

In the Mazandarani language of Iran, "pintek" means "pentad"; in the Mazanderani calendar, the year is divided into 12 thirty-day months and one pentad of days, often beginning on March 21. Neowrez Khani is one of the strongest and most popular traditions of the Mazanderani people.

The last Wednesday of the old winter is known as "Kal Char Shenba". On this day, every family builds a fire in front of their house, and every member of the family jumps over it while saying "Burea Qa o Biyea Shadi", bidding sadness to go and joy to stay. Households also prepare a soup called Ach and offer it to their neighbors. As a sign of kindness to one another, the Ach dish is not washed.

About fifteen days before spring arrives, groups of singers are formed, and they go from house to house. In return, it is customary for the householders to give them gifts or to offer them sweets, candies, eggs, peas, and other foods. In Mazanderani culture, it is disrespectful to offer them money.

One song includes the lyrics:

Wehareon wa Biyamow / Neowrez Sowltan Biyamow
Mejeda Hadein She Dusston re / Gol Biyamow Goleston re

which translates as:

Feel the wind of spring / Feel the entrance of Neowrez
Congratulate your friends / Flower comes to flowering

On the thirteenth day of spring, women of each village, with their relatives and friends from neighbouring villages, gather to spend time and have fun together. Elsewhere in the village, men hold a wrestling competition that lasts from morning until evening.

== Gallery ==
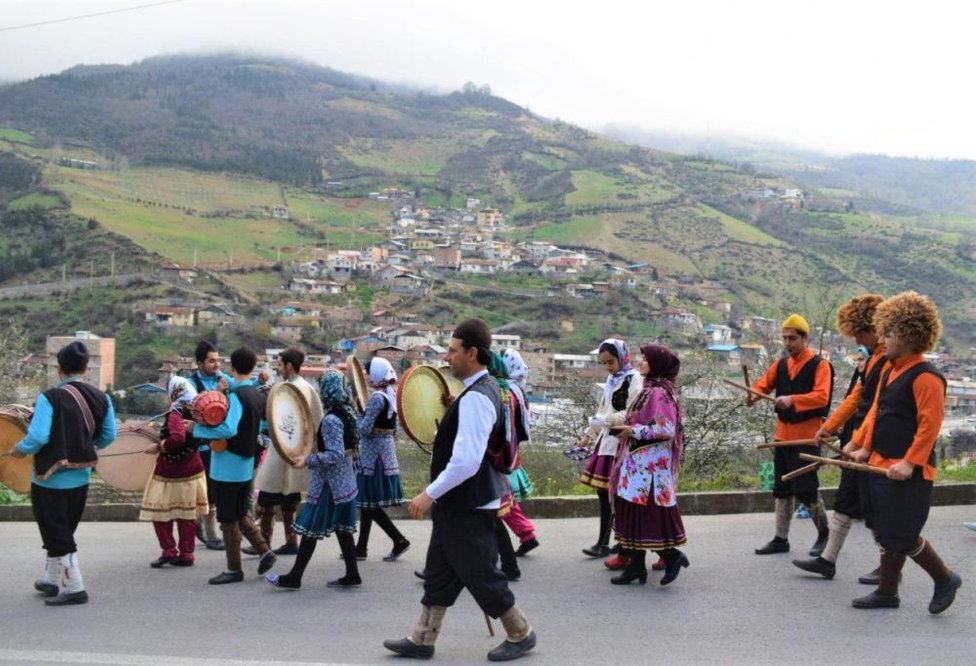

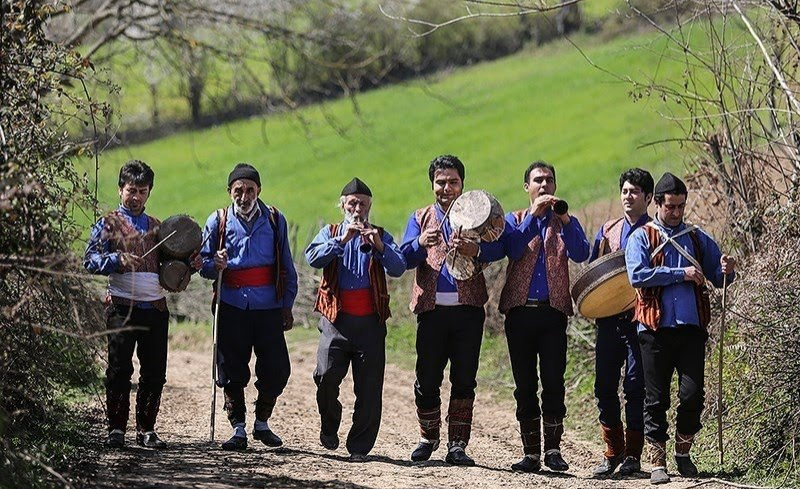

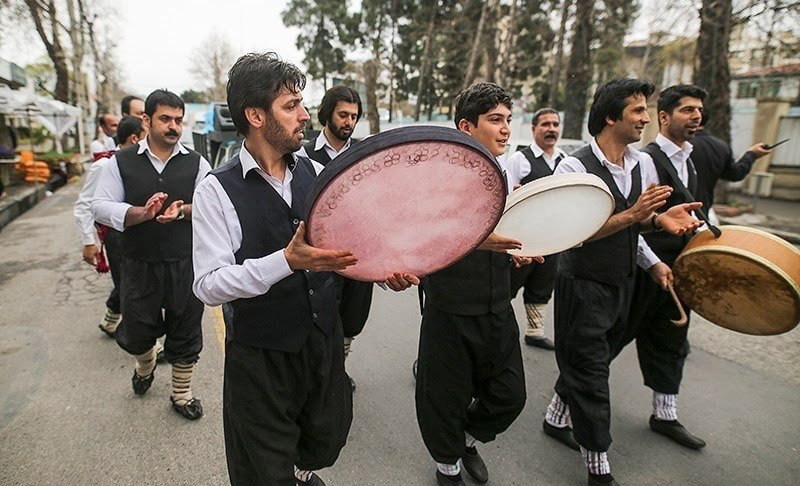

== See also ==
- Nowruz
- Mazanderani dance
- Mazandarani mythology
