= Iranian mythology =

Iranian mythology or Iranic mythology may refer to any of the following mythologies of various Iranian peoples:

- Persian mythology
- Kurdish mythology
- Mazandarani mythology
- Scythian mythology
  - Ossetian mythology
- Azerbaijani mythology

== See also ==
- Iranian religions
- Proto-Indo-Iranian religion
- Ancient Iranian religion
