= Arzhang Div =

Character of Shahnameh of Persian mythology

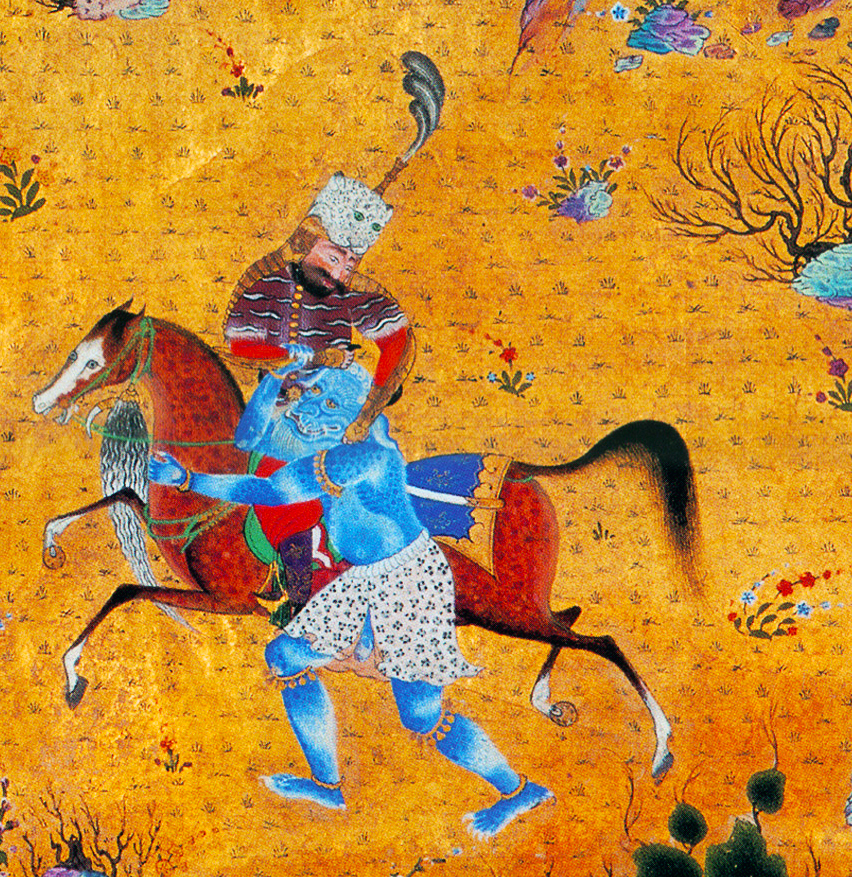
- Illustration of Rostam killing Arzhang Div from the Shahnameh (Book of Kings) by Abu'l-Qasim Manur Firdawsi (c.934-c.1020)

Creature information
- Grouping: Mythical creature
- Folklore: Persian mythology

Origin
- Country: Ancient Iran

Arzhang Div (Persian: ارژنگ دیو, romanized: Aržang Dēw) is a character in Shahnameh of Shah Tahmasp; he is the demon (Div) chief of Mazandaran in Rostam's Seven Labours. Eventually Rostam killed him and rescued Kay Kāvus.

== Arzhang Div and Moral in the Shahnameh ==
In Ferdowsi's epic poem, the Shahnameh, Arzhang Div is one of the largest human figures. Commentators describe him as the commander of demons.

According to interpretations, the defeat of Arzhang the demon was a symbol of the collapse of the demon dynasty.

This episode reflects a broader mythic pattern in Iranian epic literature, where demons are depicted not only as monsters but also as deceitful and tyrannical enemies.

Ultimately, the role of Arzhang div's highlights the moral conflict in the Shahnameh, contrasting the divine power of Rostam with the corrupt power of the demonic rulers.
