= Jamshid (name) =

JAMSHĒD or Jamshīd (Kurdish: Cemşîd, Persian: جمشید, pronounced [dʒæmˈʃiːd]), also spelled as Jamshed, Jamshid, Jamshaid, Jamsheed, Cemşid, Jamshet, or Jamset, is a Persian masculine given name. It is derived from Jamshid, a mythical king from Iranian history. Jamshid is a common name in Iran, Central Asia and among Muslims and Parsis of South Asia. It may refer to the following:

== Given name ==
- Jamshid Shah Miri (died 1343), second Sultan of Kashmir
- Jamshid Afshar, Iranian fighter pilot
- Jamshid Amouzegar (1923–2016), Iranian politician
- Jamshed Ansari (1942–2005), Pakistani film actor
- Jamshed Anwar (born 1974), Pakistani footballer
- Jamshid Behnam (1928–2021), Iranian writer
- Jamshed Bharucha (born 1956), Indian-American educator
- Jamshed Dasti (born 1972), Member of the National Assembly of Pakistan
- Jamshid Delshad (born 1940), Iranian-American politician
- Jamshid Eshaghi (1961–2026), Iranian brigadier general
- Jamshid Giunashvili (1931–2017), Georgian linguist, Iranologist, researcher, author, and diplomat
- Jamshyd Godrej, billionaire Indian industrialist
- Jamsetjee Jejeebhoy (1783–1859), Indian merchant and philanthropist
- Jamshid Karimov (born 1967), Uzbek journalist
- Jamshid Kashani (c. 1380 – 1429), Iranian medieval mathematician
- Jamshid Maharramov (born 1983), Azerbaijani footballer
- Jamshid Momtaz (born 1949), Iranian academic
- Jamshid Nakhchivanski (1895–1938), Imperial Russian, Azerbaijani, and Soviet military commander
- Jamshid Nassiri (born 1959), Iranian footballer
- Jamshid Sharmahd (1955–2024), Iranian-German software engineer
- Jamsetji Tata (1839–1904), Indian industrial pioneer
- Jamshid bin Abdullah of Zanzibar (1929–2024), Sultan of Zanzibar
- Junaid Jamshed (1964–2016), Pakistani singer
- Nasir Jamshed (born 1989), Pakistani cricketer
- Sam Hormusji Framji Jamshedji Manekshaw (1914–2008), Field Marshal of the Indian Army

== See also ==
- Jamshid Nakhchivanski Military Lyceum
- Jamshed Town, Karachi, Sindh, Pakistan
- Jamshedpur, India
