= Div-e Sepid =

Character in the Persian epic of Shahnameh

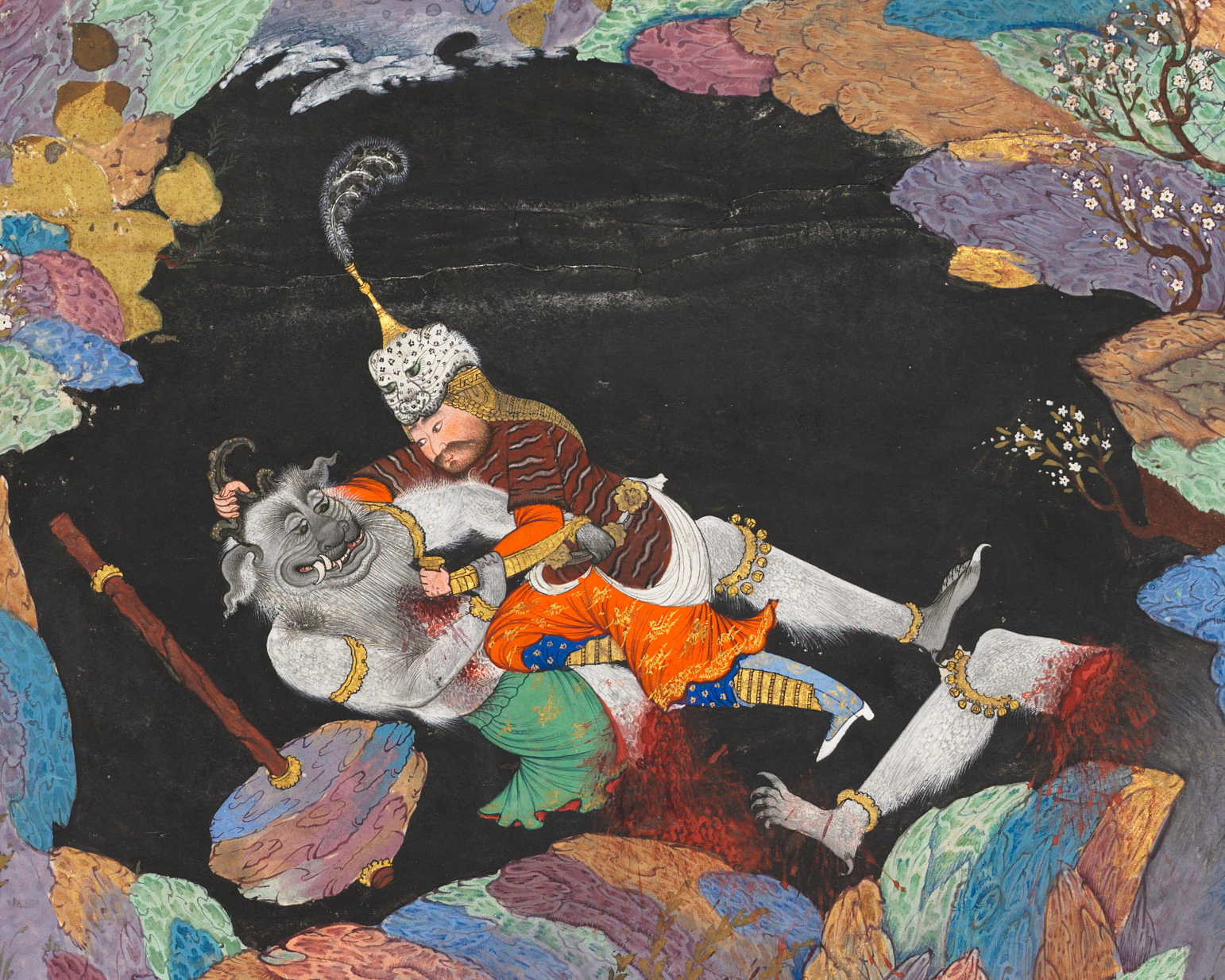
- Rostam dismembering the White Div, demon king of Mazandaran, Persian miniature from the Shahnameh of Shah Tahmasp

Creature information
- Grouping: Mythical creature
- Folklore: Persian mythology

Origin
- Country: Ancient Iran

Div-e Sepid (Persian: دیو سپید, [dēw-i səpēd], lit. White Div), is the chieftain of the Divs (demons) of Mazandaran in the Persian epic the Shahnameh. He is a huge being, possesses great physical strength and is skilled in sorcery and necromancy.

Div-e Sepid uses his magic to destroy the army of Kay Kavus by conjuring a dark storm of hail, boulders, and tree trunks. He then captures Kay Kavus, his commanders, and paladins; blinds them, and imprisons them in a dungeon. The greatest Persian mythical hero Rostam undertakes his "Seven Labors" to free his sovereign. At the end, Rostam slays Div-e Sepid and uses his heart and blood to cure the blindness of the king and the captured Persian heroes. Rostam also takes the Div's head as a helmet and is often pictured wearing it.

== In the Shabrangnama ==
In the Shabrangnama it is revealed that the white demon sired a son.

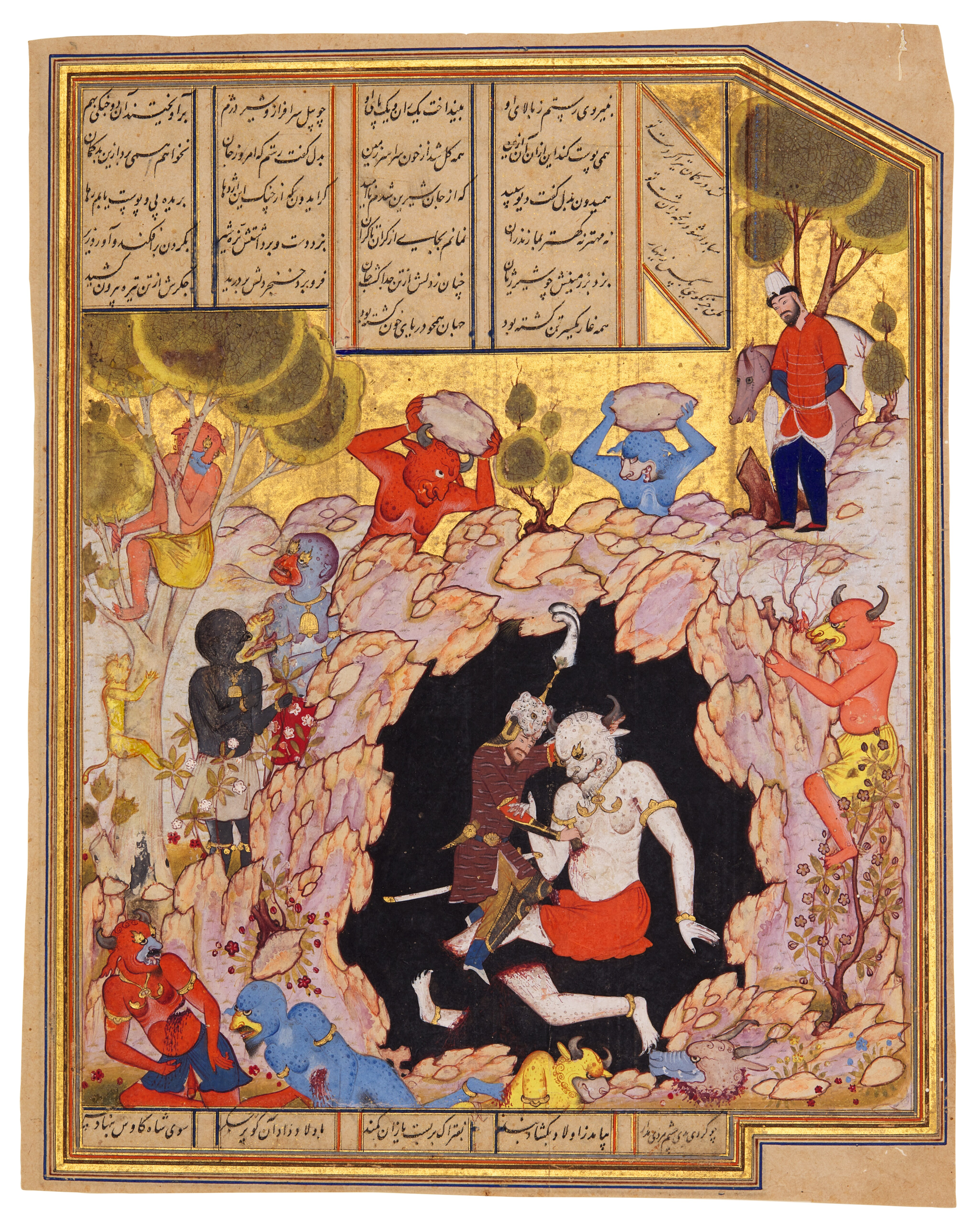
Rostam fights Div-e-Sepid

The Shabrangnama is a heroic epic that follows the story of Shabrang, son of the White Div, seeking revenge on the Iranians for his father's death by Rostam. Born with div-like features, Shabrang grows up and attacks Mazandaran, killing many, including Aulad, who ruled Mazandaran by Rostam's decree. With his mother, Mahyar, as the throne's figurehead, Shabrang leads an army against Iran. Rostam, summoned by Kay Kavus, confronts Shabrang with a group of Iranian heroes. In the ensuing battles, Shabrang uses magic to his advantage, but the Iranians ultimately defeat the divs' army, and Shabrang flees to Turan for help. The epic highlights Shabrang's unique characteristics and the use of magic in battles, providing an engaging narrative different from the Shahnameh.

== Alternative views ==
According to the Journal of the Royal Central Asian Society, the struggle between Rostam and the white demon represents a struggle between Iranians and invaders from the north, from the Caspian provinces.

The Div-e Sepid is believed by Joseph J. Reed to have been a northern prince. Warner believes that he is a personification of the Mazandaranians, who were believed to have skin of an unhealthily pale colour caused by the climate of their homeland. Some scholars opine that these divs of Mazandaran are merely wild people of the forest. Others hold that they are a group of enemy kings of ancient Mazandaran (which might have been different from its modern location) and Tabaristan. Alexander Krappe theorized that Ahriman himself was believed to have white skin. P. Molesworth Sykes believes that the name "White Div" represents a white nation.

According to one source, Zal spoke of the horrid race of white-skinned people. This however contradicts the fact that Zal was an albino himself. Zal means albino in Persian language.

According to the Georgian Chronicles, the one who blinded K'ekapos (Kay Kavus) was the chief of the Laks.

In the Kush Nama written by the poet Iranshah, the White Div is given the name of Eridu (اریدو or ارندو) and is said to have been a descendant of Ham, son of Noah. He is described as having "a body like a camel and a white hide, his strength inspired fear and hope. The Nubians spoke much about him, they call him the White Demon. The men of that land had never seen anyone with such strength in times of battle and trials of honor. His upper body was like the branches of trees, his neck and shoulders like a savage elephant."
