= Mazandaran (Shahnameh) =

Land in Shahnameh

Devil's Land
Mazandaran

Shahnameh Countries
- Type: Ancient Country
- king: Div-e Sepid

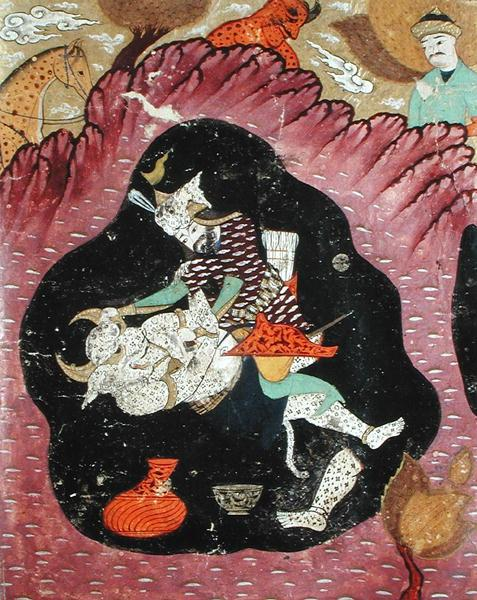
Rostam dismembering the White Div, demon king of Mazandaran

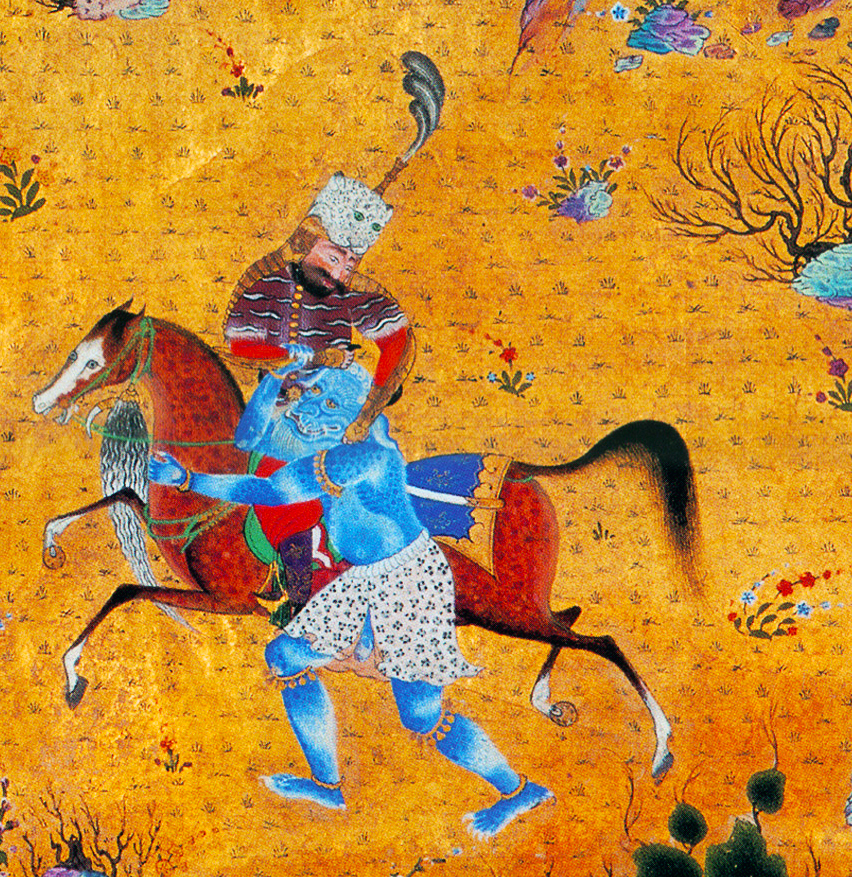
Rostam kills Arzhang Div, demon chief of mazandaran

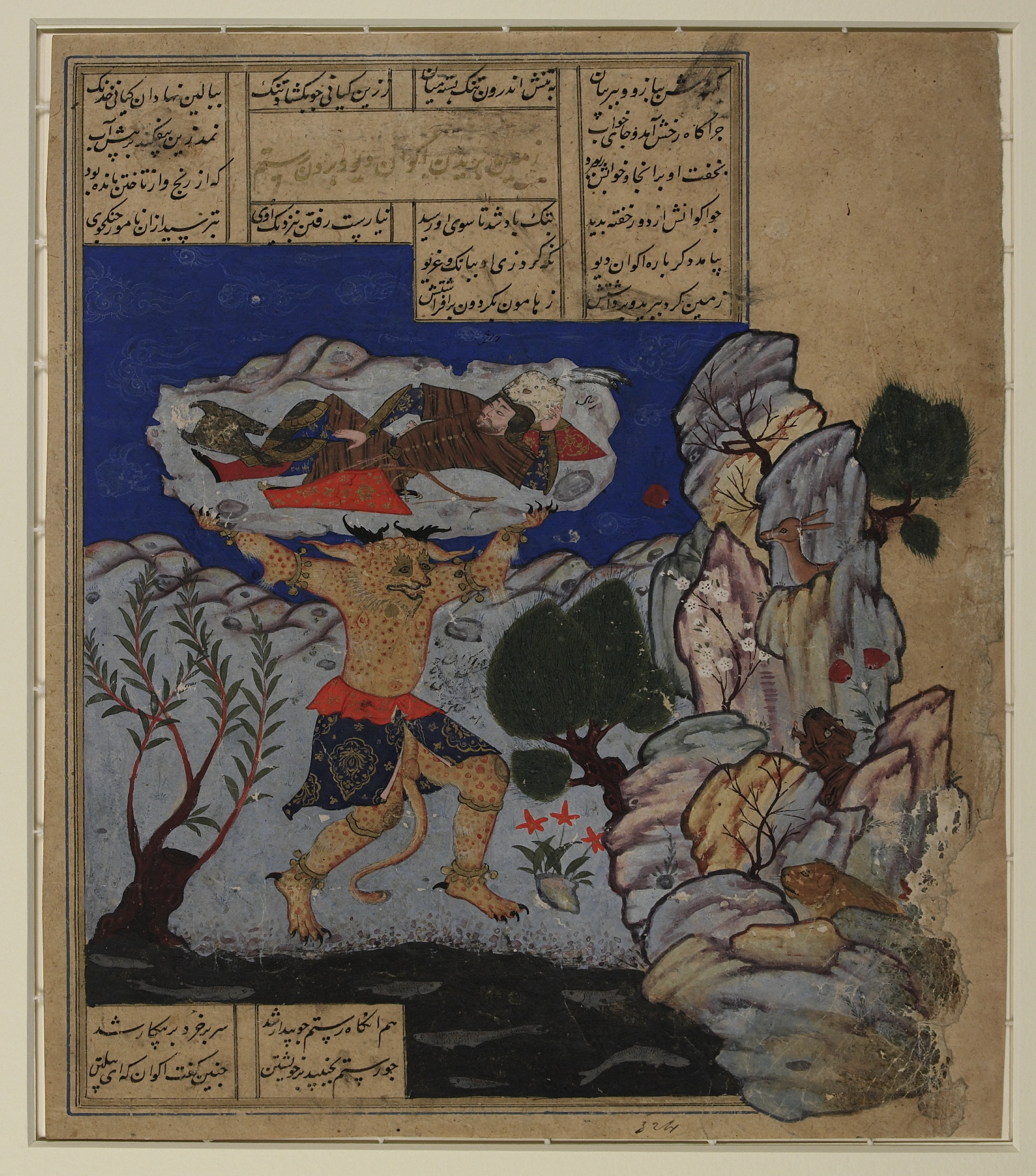
The Akvan Div throws Rustam into the sea

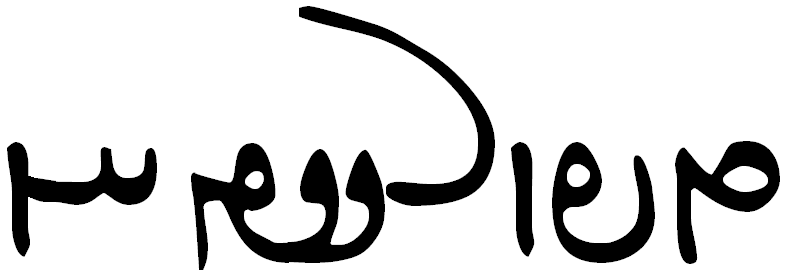
Mâzandarân (Persian: مازندران, ultimately from Middle Persian: ), is an important place known as Devil's Land whose name is mentioned 63 times in the Shahnameh, the national epic of Greater Iran. There are references to the Mazandaran of legend not only in the Shahnameh, but also in the much older Avesta.

It is not clear where Mazandaran was located – various places have been suggested. Some scholars believe that Mazandaran was a region in India, others place it in the Levant or Egypt, but there is no consensus among the scholars.

The Mazandaran of legend was inhabited by a population that was different from other Iranians: godless magicians, they were invincible to other humans, conquerable only by the power of God.

== In the Shahnameh ==
In the Shahnameh, Mazandaran is the abode of great Divs (demons) - so fearful a land that no Shah of Iran dare try to conquer it. One day - so the epic relates - a Div visits Kay Kāvus in order to tempt him by reading him a poem extolling the fabulous wealth and beauty of Mazandaran. Ravished by the Div's description and filled with greed, Kay Kavus, an impulsive and imprudent ruler, resolves to conquer the rich kingdom. Everyone is opposed to this decision, recalling that even such great kings as the ingenious Jamshid and mighty Fereydun had never attempted the conquest of Mazandaran. Unmoved by this wise counsel, Kay Kavus persists in his folly, marching to Mazandaran with his army - only to be defeated, blinded and imprisoned by the Divs, together with two-thirds of his army. He sends a letter to Zāl, begging him to come and rescue him, but Zāl, considering himself too old for such exploits, sends his son, Rostam, instead - despite the fact that the great hero is still only a youth. The safe route to Mazandaran being too roundabout, Rostam has to undertake a shorter path beset with supernatural trials and dangers - and thus come about the celebrated Haftkhān-e-Rostam, the Seven Labours, in which Rostam, ably abetted by his brave and faithful steed Rakhsh, is victorious over the evil beings that try to bar his way as he journeys on his quest to rescue Kāvus and his men from the monstrous Div-e Sepid (White Div).

Prior to the above, there are some references to Mazandaran in the story of Zāl and Rudaba which suggest that Sām, the grandfather of Rostam, may have conquered Mazandaran at the time of Manuchehr.

== Sources ==
- Ferdowsi Shahnameh. From the Moscow version. Mohammed Publishing. ISBN 964-5566-35-5
