= Rostam's Seven Labours =

Series of acts carried out by Rostam

The Seven Tales of Rustam (Persian: هفت خان رستم, romanized: Haftkhān-e-Rostam) were a series of acts carried out by the greatest of the Iranian heroes, Rostam. The story was retold by Ferdowsi in his epic poem, the Shahnameh. The Seven Labours were seven difficult tasks undertaken by Rostam, accompanied, in most instances, only by his faithful and sagacious steed Rakhsh, although in two labours he was accompanied also by the champion, Olad.

== The Haftkhān ==
According to the traditional narrative, the story starts when Kay Kāvus's expedition to Mazandaran fails, and his army is captured by the Divs. Rostam undertakes to liberate it, and achieves his goal by performing the labours. The traditional order of the seven is as follows:

=== 1st Labour: Lion ===
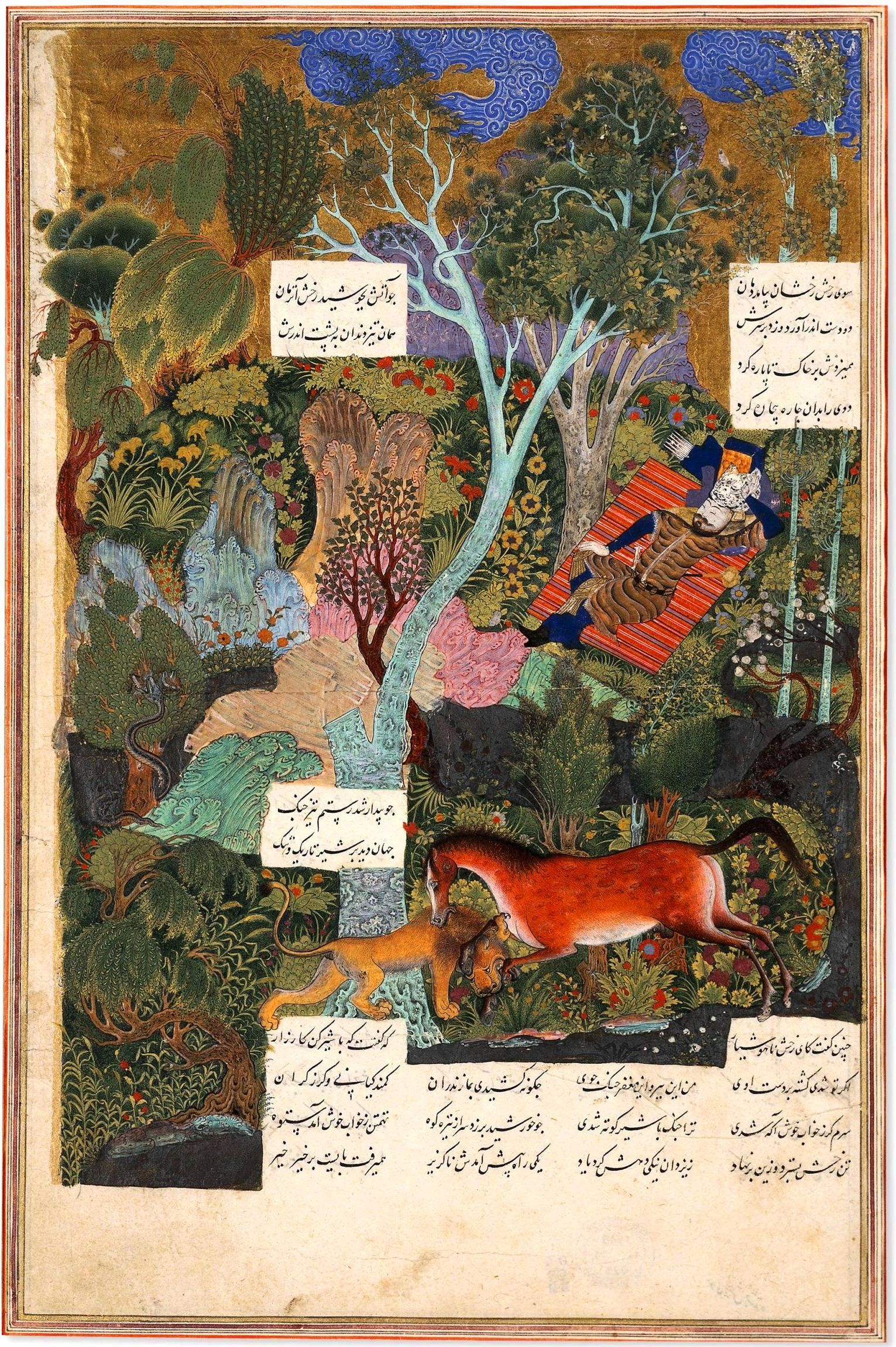
The First Labour

Rostam falls asleep among the reeds. After a short time, a fierce lion appears, and mounts a ferocious attack on his horse Rakhsh; but Rakhsh, although hard-pressed, succeeds in killing the savage beast with his teeth and hooves. Rostam, awakened by the tumult, and seeing the dead lion and the wounded Rakhsh before him, makes haste to heal his beloved steed, before remounting him and continuing on his way toward Mazandaran.

=== 2nd Labour: Thirst ===
Rostam enters a desert, in which no water is to be found. Both horse and rider become oppressed with thirst and therefore, Rostam prays to God. Sweltering under the burning sun, Rostam sees a sheep pass by, which he hails as the harbinger of good. Rising up and grasping his sword in his hand, he follows the animal, and comes to a fountain of water, where he devoutly returns thanks to God for the blessing which has preserved his existence.

=== 3rd Labour: Dragon ===
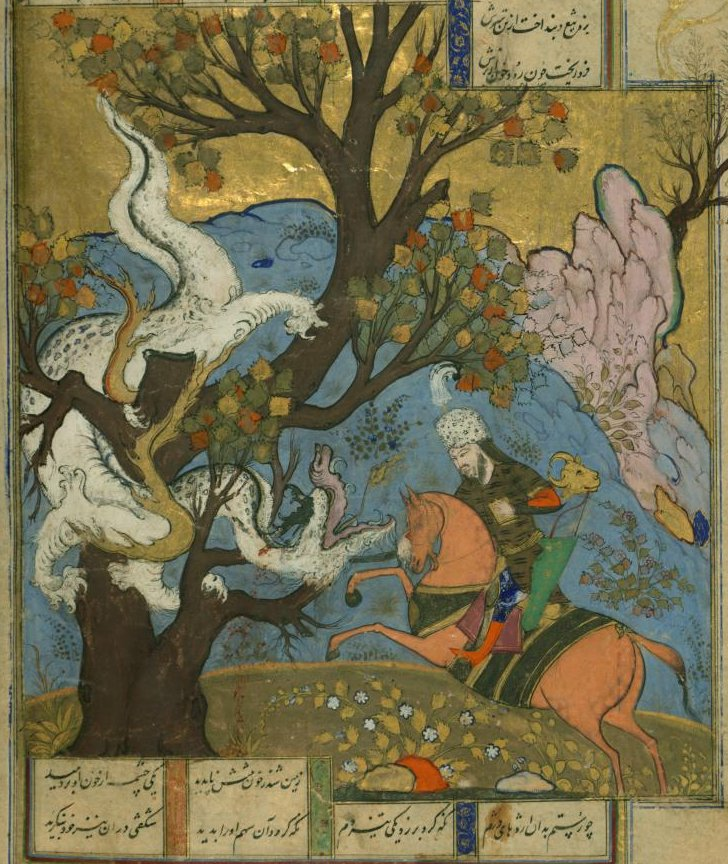
Rostam slays the dragon; 17th-century Persian manuscript

At midnight a monstrous serpentine dragon emerges from the forest; Rakhsh approaches his sleeping master and neighs and beats the ground so furiously, that he succeeds in waking him. Rostam looks around, but, seeing nothing, because the dragon has already vanished, grumbles and goes back to sleep. The dragon appears a second time and once again the faithful horse succeeds in rousing his master. Rostam is even angrier than before; but at this moment sufficient light is providentially given him to allow him to see the monster that has been causing Rakhsh such alarm. Rostam then slays the dragon.

=== 4th Labour: Temptress ===
Rostam, back in the saddle once more, continues his journey through enchanted lands, and comes, at evening, to a beautiful glade refreshed by limpid streams, where he finds, much to his surprise, a ready-roasted deer, together with the bread and salt to accompany it. He sits down to the mysterious banquet, but it vanishes at the sound of his voice. Next, he sees a tanbur and a flask of wine: taking up the instrument, he plays upon it, improvising a ditty about his own wanderings, and the kinds of exploit which he loves best. The song reaches the ears of the alluring sorceress responsible for the fairy banquet, who suddenly appears and sits down at his side. Rostam offers up a prayer of thanks for having been supplied with food, wine, and music in so inhospitable a place as the desert of Mazandaran, and, not realising that the enchantress is, in fact, a demon in disguise, he places in her hands a cup of wine in the name of God; but, at the mention of the Creator, the temptress is forced to resume her true form – that of a black fiend. Seeing this, Rostam holds her fast with his lasso, before drawing his sword and cleaving her in two.

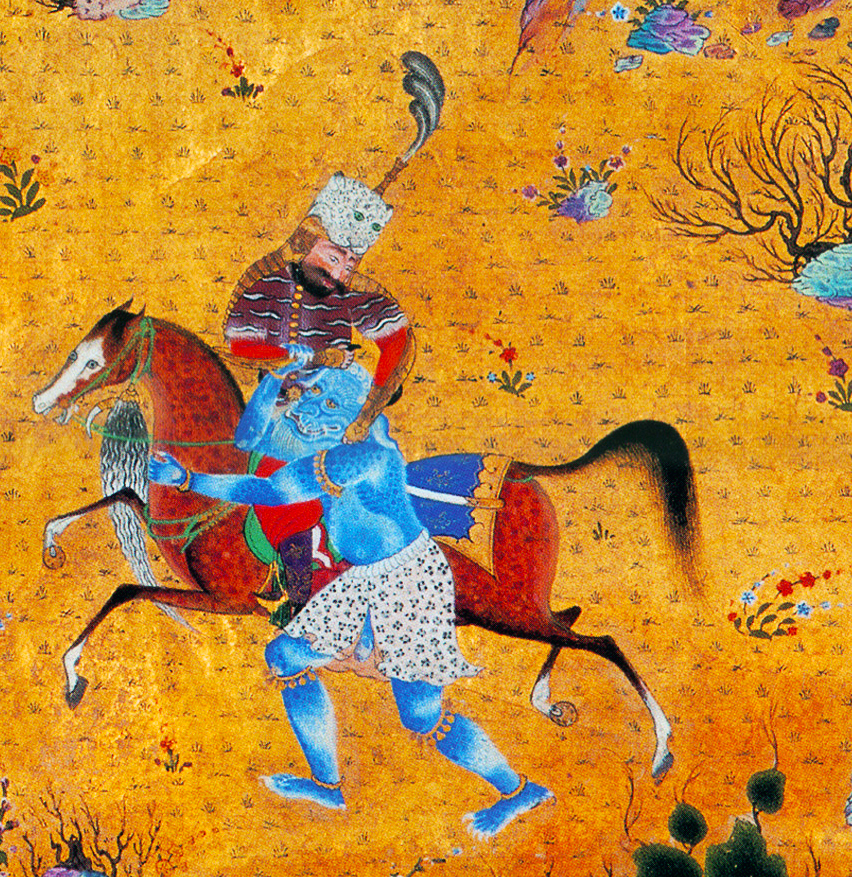
Rostam kills Arzhang in the Shahnameh of Shah Tahmasp

This labour bears a marked resemblance to an episode involving the temptation of Sir Perceval in the Grail quest section of the thirteenth century Arthurian text known as the Vulgate cycle and also as the Lancelot-Grail. This resemblance may be due to the borrowing of material from the Persian text into the European. Such borrowings have been detected before in certain Arthurian romances – notably in the Parzival of Wolfram von Eschenbach and the Jungerer Titurel of Albrecht von Scharfenberg, in which the description of the Grail temple is strongly reminiscent of the Takht-e Soleymān.

=== 5th Labour: Demons ===
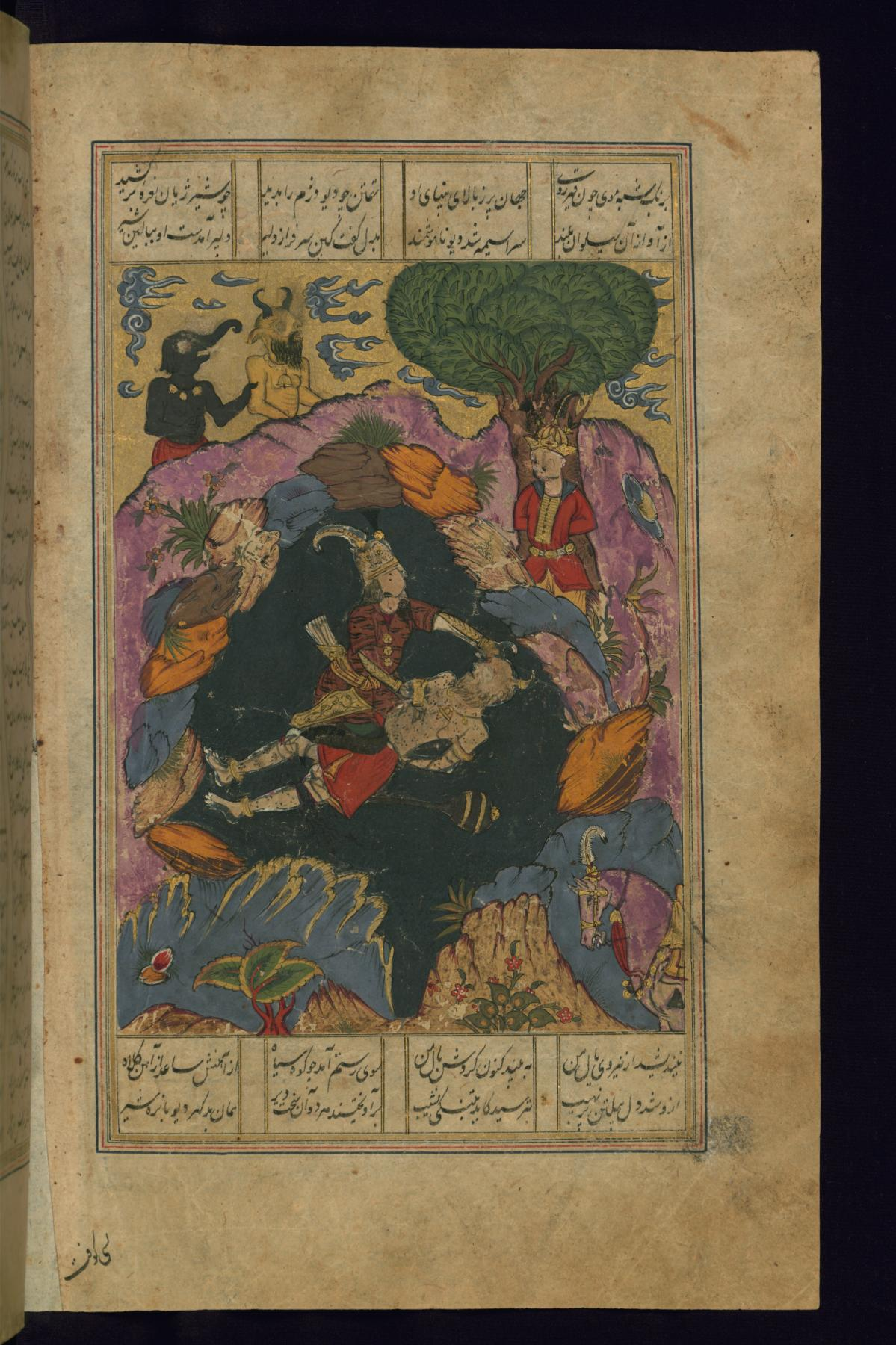
Rustam Kills the White Demon, Div-e Sepid

Rostam conquers the Mazandarani champion Olad Deev, who describes the caves of the demons.

=== 6th Labour: Rescue the king ===
Rostam enters the city of Mazandaran, releases king Kay Kāvus – still blind from the sorcery of the demons – and slays Arzhang Div.

=== 7th Labour: White Demon ===
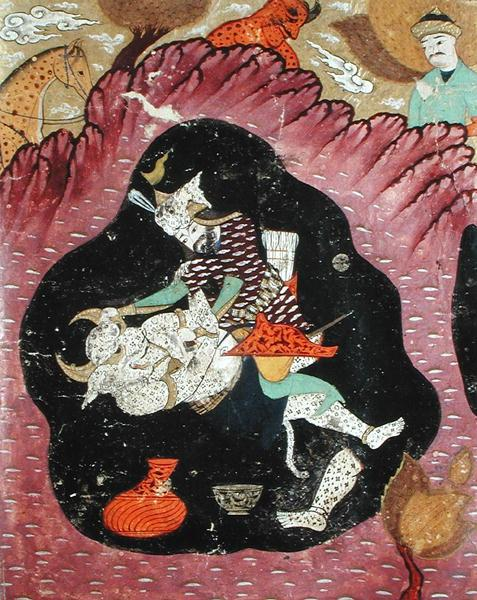
Rostam kills Div-e-Sepid, the White Demon

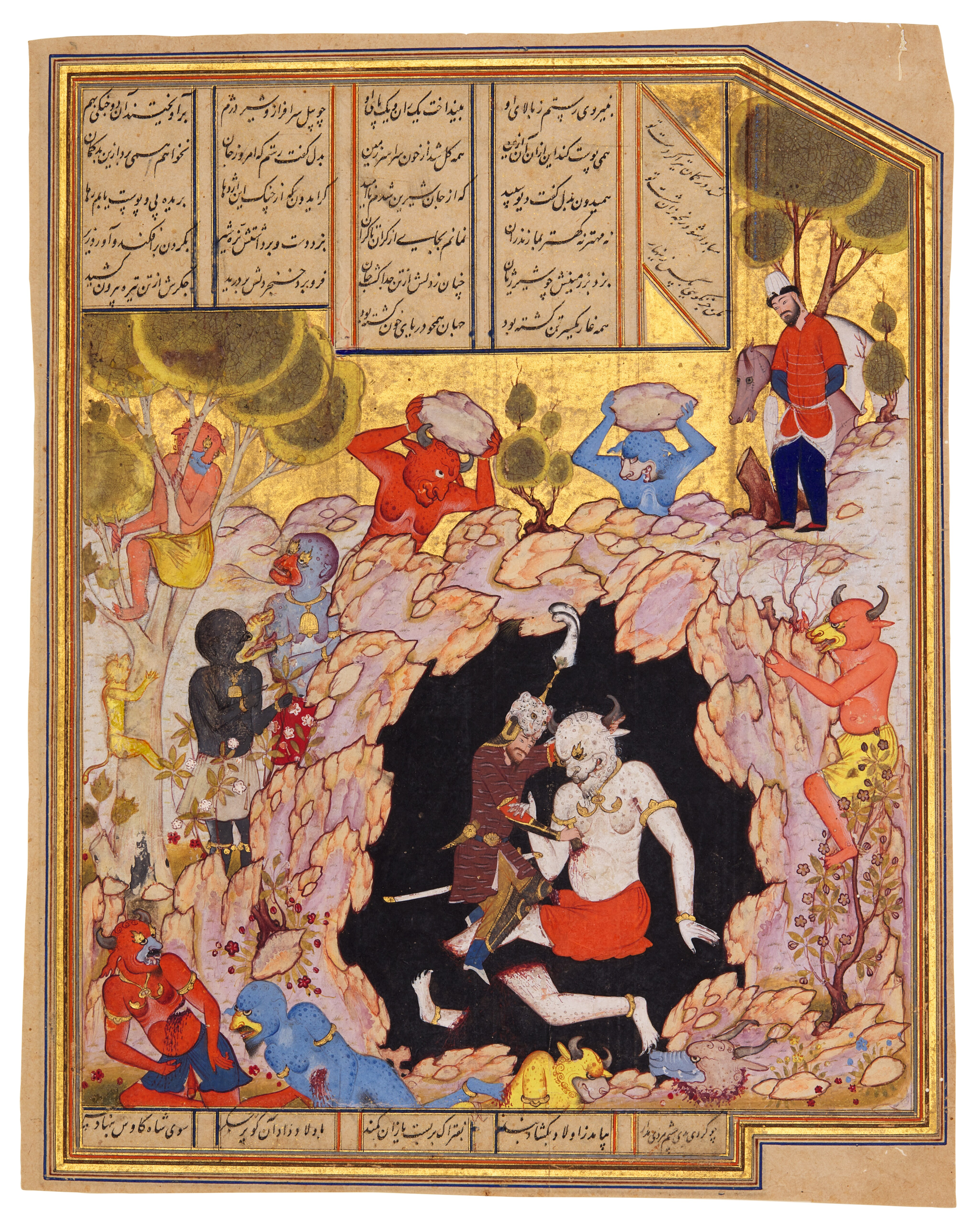
Rostam fights Div-e-Sepid

Rostam overthrows and kills Div-e-Sepid, the White Demon. The blood of the White Demon's heart restores Kay Kāvus's sight. Rostam also kills the magician king of Mazandaran (not to be confused with Mazandaran province) and returns to Estakhr accompanied by the Kay Kāvus and his liberated army.

== See also ==
- Esfandiyār's Seven Labors, another tale from the Shahnameh with the same structure.
- Labours of Hercules, an ancient Greek tale of another Indo-European hero showing similarities to those of Rostam and Esfandiyār.

== Sources and references ==
- Abolqasem Ferdowsi, Dick Davis trans. (2006), Shahnameh: The Persian Book of Kings ISBN 0-670-03485-1, modern English translation (abridged), current standard
- Warner, Arthur and Edmond Warner, (translators) The Shahnama of Firdausi, 9 vols. (London: Keegan Paul, 1905–1925) (complete English verse translation)
- Shirzad Aghaee, Nam-e kasan va ja'i-ha dar Shahnama-ye Ferdousi (Personalities and Places in the Shahnama of Ferdousi, Nyköping, Sweden, 1993. (ISBN 91-630-1959-0)
- Jalal Khāleghi Motlagh, Editor, The Shahnameh, to be published in 8 volumes (ca. 500 pages each), consisting of six volumes of text and two volumes of explanatory notes. See: Center for Iranian Studies, Columbia University.
