= Mazanderani dances =

Mazanderani dances, also known as Tabarian dances, are dances that are performed throughout the world by Mazandarani people, mostly on occasions such as weddings.

== Types of Dances ==
- Lak Sema
- Dasmal Sema
- Majme Sema
- Lampa Sema
- Derum Bakordan (Tak Dast)
- Tesh Sema
- Chakka Sema
- Saz Sema
- Sema Hal

== See also ==
- Mazandarani people
