= Sindukht =

Fictional character in the Shahnameh

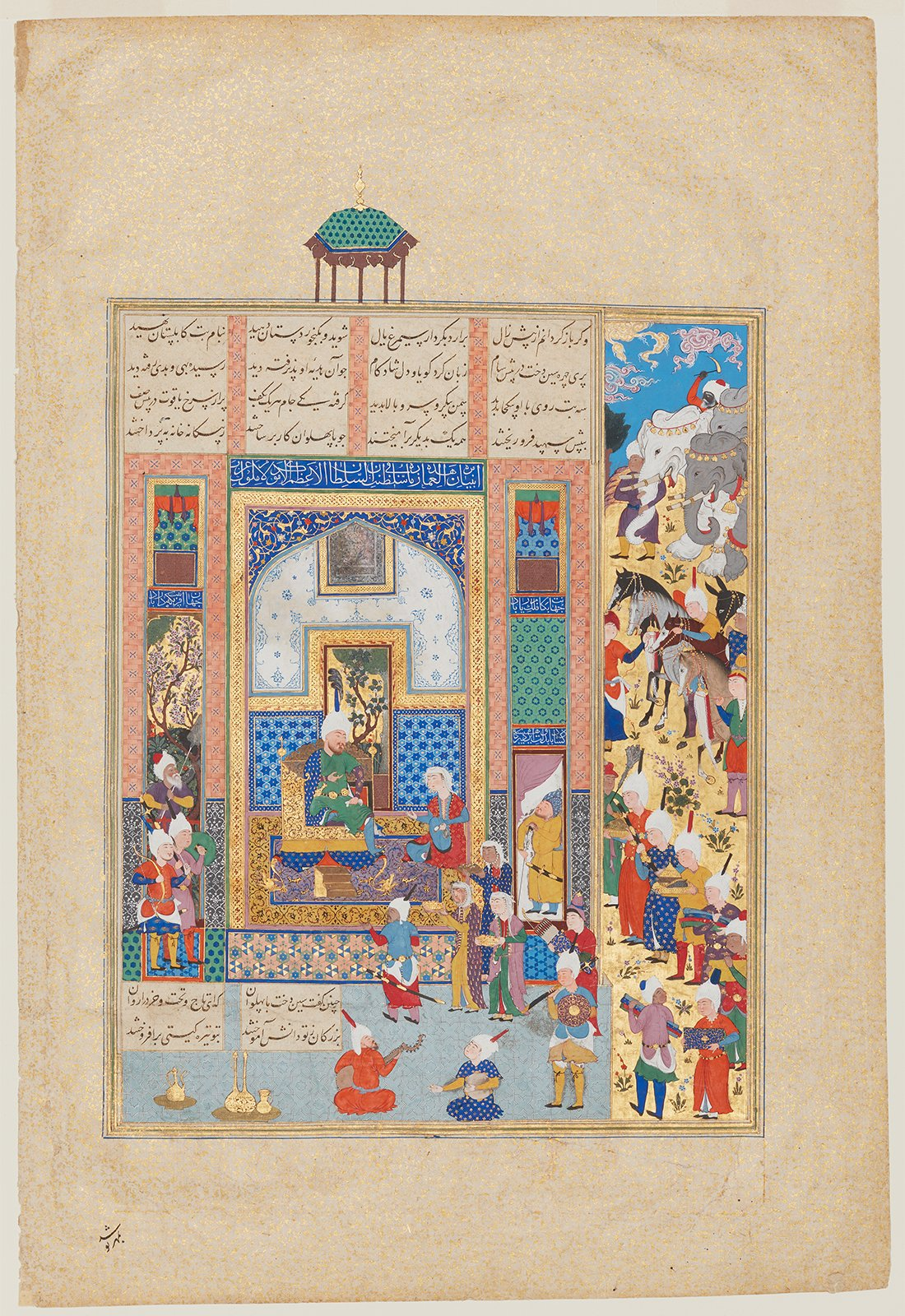
Sindukht comes to Sam Bearing Gifts, Miniature from the Shahnameh of Shah Tahmasp. Tabriz, c. 1525-30. Aga Khan Museum

Sindukht (Persian: سیندُخت) (meaning "the daughter of Simorgh) is the wife of Mehrab Kaboli and the mother of Roodabeh, in the Persian epic poem Shahnameh by Ferdowsi. She is described as "a beautiful and intelligent woman". When she learned about the love between Roodabeh and Zāl, she first became angry, arguing that Sām (father of Zāl) and Manuchehr (then king of Iran) would disapprove of their marriage and so they would destroy Kabul (because they worshiped different religions and Mehrab was of Zahhak's descendants), but when Zāl managed to convince Sām and Manuchehr, Sindukht and Mehrab also supported their marriage. She is the grandmother of Rostam.

== Family tree ==
Zahhak
Sām	Mehrab Kaboli	Sindukht
Zāl	Rudaabeh
Rostam
