= Mehrab Kaboli =

Character in the Shahnameh

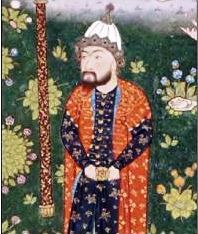
painting of Mihrab in the Shahnama of Shah Tahmasp

Mehrāb Kāboli (Persian: مهراب کابلی) or Mehrāb, is a character in the Persian epic Shahnameh. He is the king of Kabol and is most famous for being the father of Rudaba and the grandfather of her son, the famous Persian hero, Rostam. His wife is Sindukht.

== Heritage and Symbolism of Mehrāb in Persian Epic Tradition ==
In the Shahnameh, Mehrāb of Kabul (Persian: مهرابِ کابلی) appears in the episode of Zāl and Rudāba. He is described as a descendant of Zahhāk, which causes concern among the Iranian nobles when Zāl falls in love with his daughter, Rudāba. Despite his lineage, Mehrāb is portrayed as a wise and noble ruler who governs Kabul with justice and dignity. His willingness to marry his daughter to Zāl — a union between the Iranian and foreign royal lines — symbolizes reconciliation and the bridging of cultural divides in Ferdowsi’s epic narrative.

In later interpretations, Mehrāb’s character is viewed as representing the tension between inherited guilt and personal virtue — a ruler descended from an evil ancestor who nonetheless embodies justice and wisdom.

== Family tree ==
Zahhak
Sām	Mehrab Kaboli	Sindukht
Zāl	Rudaabeh
Rostam
