= Surab =

Surab may refer to:

- Surab, Pakistan, a town in Balochistan, Pakistan
- Sirab, village and municipality of Nakhchivan, Azerbaijan
- Surab, Iranshahr, a village in Sistan and Baluchetan Province, Iran
- Surab, Qaen, a village in South Khorasan Province, Iran

== See also ==
- Sohrab (disambiguation)
- Zurab, Georgian name
