= Rustom O Sohrab =

1929 play by Agha Hashar Kashmiri

- Original language: Urdu language
- Written by: Agha Hashar Kashmiri
- Based on: Rostam and Sohrab in Shahnameh by Ferdowsi
- Characters: Rostam; Sohrab; Tahmineh
- Genre: Tragedy

Rustom O Sohrab or Rustam-Sohrab is an Urdu play by Agha Hashar Kashmiri. It was first published in 1929.

== See also ==
- Rustom Sohrab
