= Pakzad =

Pakzad (Persian: پاکزاد, romanized: 'Pakzâd) is a surname. Notable people with the surname include:

- Bijan Pakzad Iranian designer of menswear and fragrances.
- Izabel Pakzad American actress and filmmaker.
- Suraya Pakzad Afghan women's rights activist.
- Hafiz Pakzad prominent Afghan painter.
- Sohrab Pakzad Iranian singer, composer, and model.
