= Rostam and Sohrab =

Persian legends tale

The tragedy of "Rostam and Sohrab" forms part of the Shahnameh, the 10th-century Persian epic by the Persian poet Ferdowsi. It tells the tragic story of the heroes Rostam and his son, Sohrab.

The story of Rostam and Sohrab is just one small portion of the vast compilation of stories that make up the Iranian national epic, commonly known as the Shahnameh, or Book of Kings. The Shahnameh traces the history of the Iranian nation from the first mythological shah, Kiumars, down to the defeat and death of the last Sasanian emperor, Yazdegerd III, at the hands of the Arab armies of Islam in the middle of the seventh century AD.

The events narrated in the first two-thirds of the Shahnameh—tales both heroic and romantic—belong to a mythical or legendary time. In the last third, these events are set in historical times, and stories are introduced from the biography of Alexander the Great and from the history of the Parthian and Sasanian dynasties (247 BC – AD 651). But the style of presentation does not change: historical figures and events are presented as the stuff of myth and legend.

== Characters ==
=== Rostam ===
Rostam is Iran's greatest national hero, husband to Tahmineh and father to Sohrab. Renowned for his valour and prestige, he possessed a proud nature, valuing honour above all else. In the tale, he departed after marrying Tahmineh, never attempting to seek out his potential offspring; upon the battlefield, he refused to reveal his identity to preserve his reputation, ultimately slaying his own son with his own hands during a fierce engagement.

=== Tahmineh ===
Tahmineh was the princess of Samangan and Sohrab's mother. Bold in matters of love, she chose to unite with Rostam of her own accord, yet driven by conflict and fear, she opted to conceal the truth. Throughout Sohrab's upbringing, she never revealed his father's true identity nor publicly preserved the token left by Rostam. This action utterly extinguished any possibility of father and son recognising each other, laying the groundwork for the tragedy to unfold.

=== Sohrab ===
Sohrab, son of Rostam and Tahmineh, was born valiant and led the Turanian army into battle. Young and impetuous, he possessed a fierce and ambitious nature, aspiring to overthrow the Iranian king Kay Kavus and seize the throne of Afrasiab for himself. Yet he lacked political maturity and prudence. Unaware of his father's identity on the battlefield, he ultimately met his end at his own father's hand through overconfidence and a cruel twist of fate.

=== Afrasiab ===
Afrasiab was king of Turan and Iran's adversary. Cunning and treacherous, he excelled at exploiting circumstances. In this tale, he did not engage directly in battle but instead worked behind the scenes, manipulating events. He exploited Sohrab's youth and ambition to provoke conflict between father and son, thereby weakening Iran's strength.

=== Kay Kavus ===
Kay Kavus was the King of Iran, sovereign of Rostam. By nature he was suspicious, conceited and envious. After Sohrab was mortally wounded by Rostam, though he knew the antidote could save him, he refused to administer it out of jealousy for Sohrab's renown and prowess, thereby directly precipitating the tragedy's irreversible outcome.

=== Hojir ===
Hojir was an Iranian commander who, though loyal to his country, appeared timid and short-sighted. During the battle, he attempted to block Sohrab's path but was captured. In their confrontation, he misled Sohrab with falsehoods, causing the latter to misjudge the state of the battle and the relationship between friend and foe. This indirectly accelerated the unfolding tragedy.

=== Gordafarid ===
Gordafarid was a valiant Iranian warrior renowned for her resourcefulness and boldness. During a brief skirmish with Sohrab on the front lines, she feigned surrender before escaping. Through provocative manoeuvres, she delayed the Turanian advance, buying precious time for the Iranian forces. Whilst her courage was admired, her actions also served to escalate the conflict to some degree.

=== Goudarz ===
Goudarz was an elderly and highly respected veteran of Iran. Though steady in temperament and loyal to his country, he played a pivotal role in propelling events forward. When Sohrab threatened Iran, he persistently urged Rostam to take up arms once more, rendering the fated confrontation between father and son ultimately unavoidable and thus driving the tragedy to its climax.

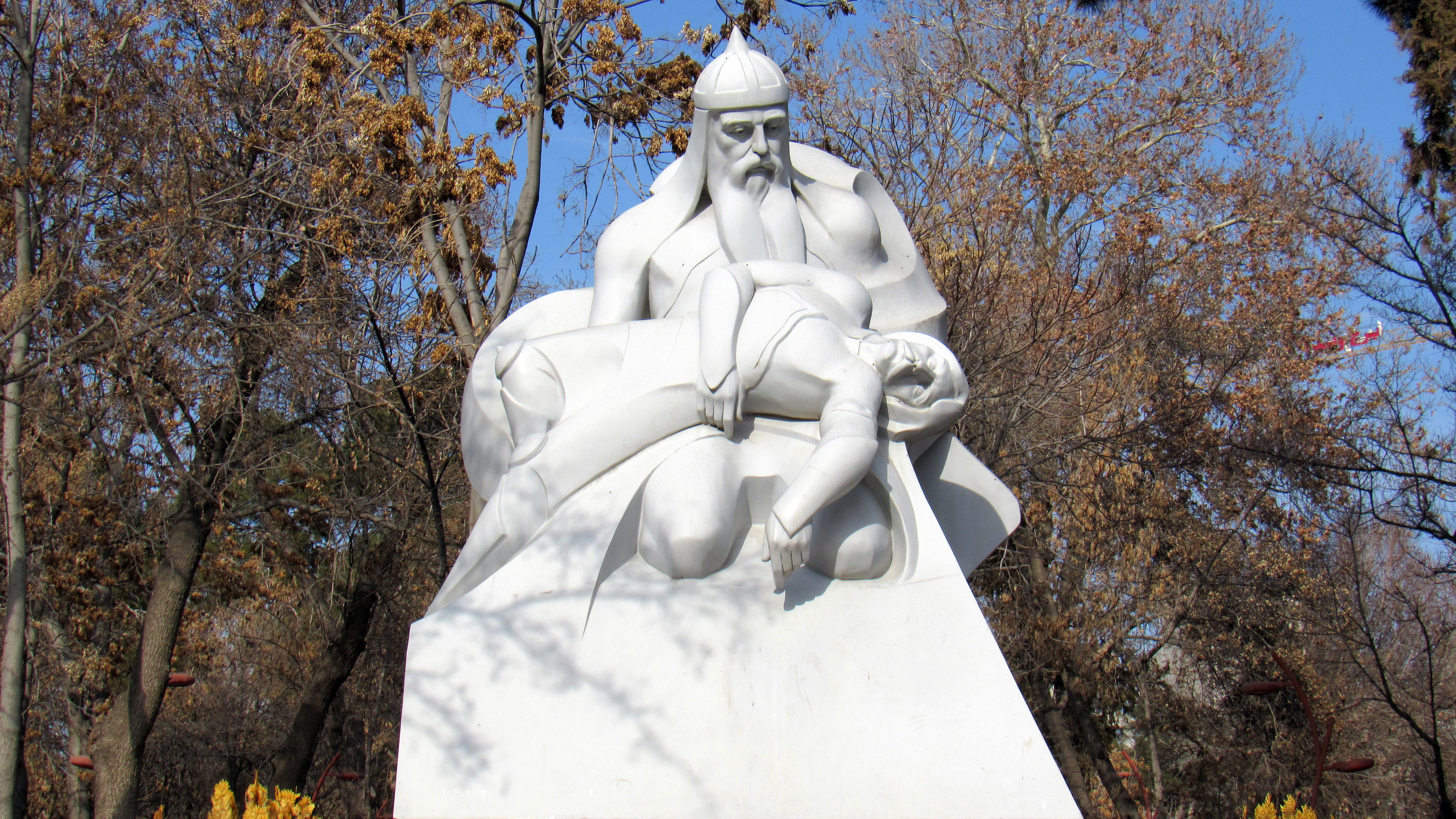
Statue of Rostam and Sohrab

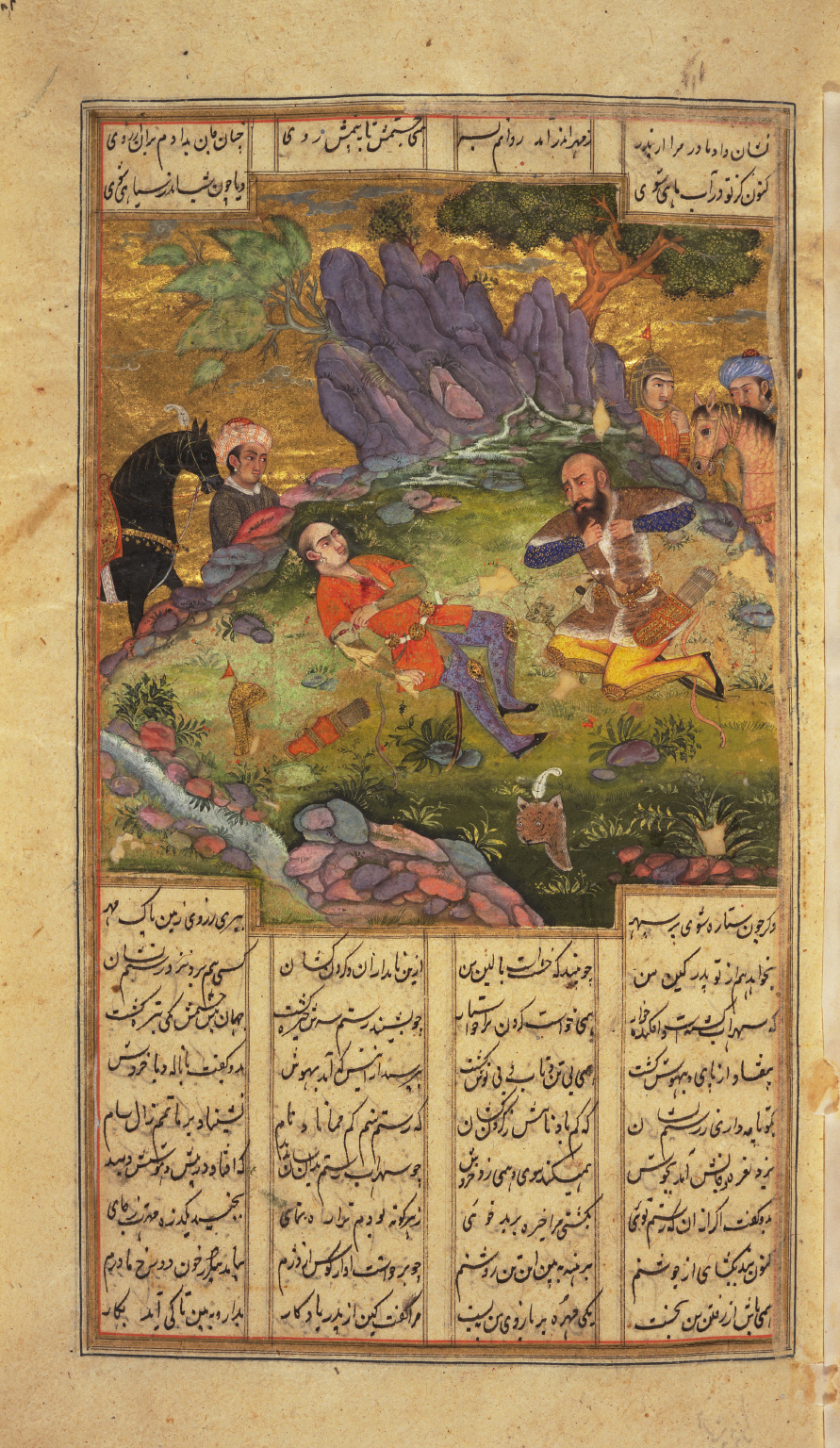
Rustam mourns Suhrab

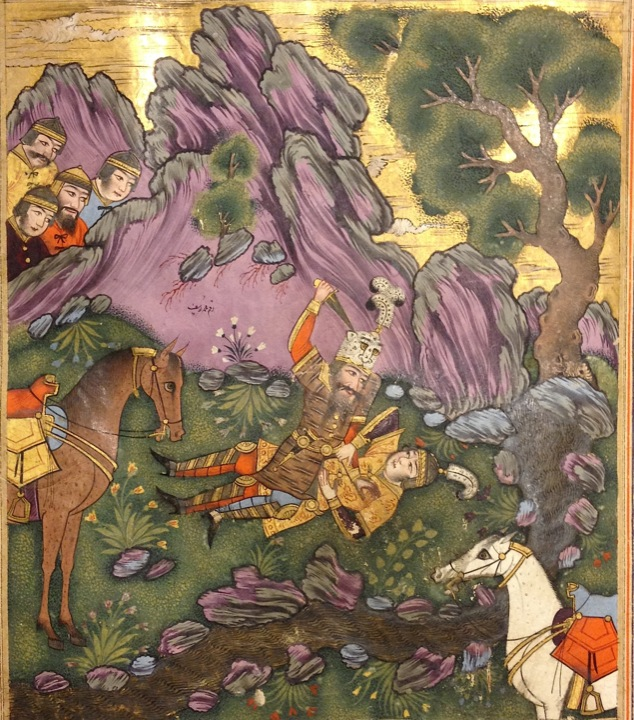
Rostam is stabbing Sohrab

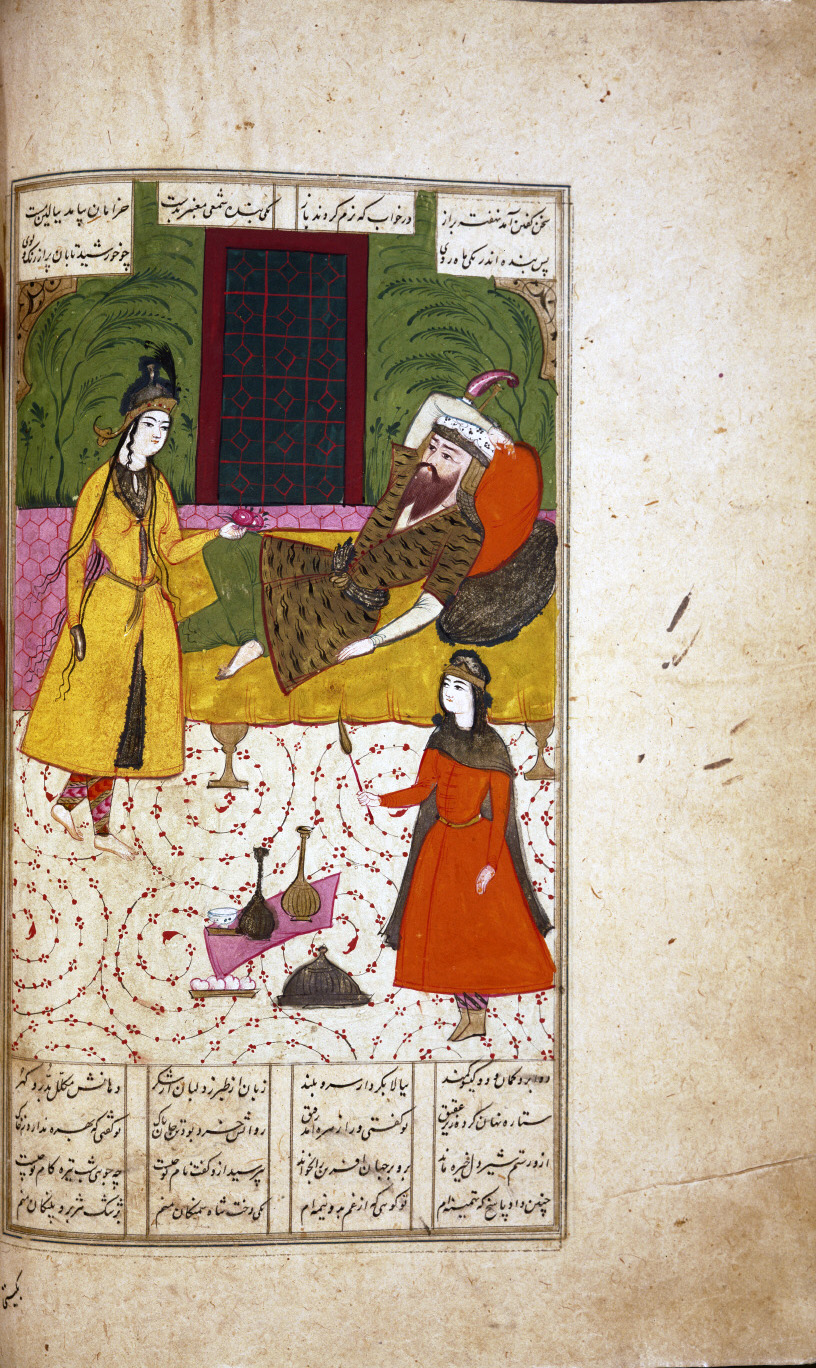
Tahmineh comes to visit Rostam

== Plot ==
The hero Rostam lived in Zabulistan, and was one of the favorites of King Kaykavous. Once, following the traces of his lost horse Rakhsh, he enters the kingdom of Samangan, where he becomes the guest of the king during his search. There, Rostam meets princess Tahmina. She admires Rostam and knows of his reputation. She goes into his room at night and declares her love for him. Rostam married the princess but abruptly leaves after he impregnates Tahmina. Before he leaves, he gives her two tokens: a jewel and a seal. If she has a girl, she is to take the jewel and plait it in the girl's hair. If she has a boy, she is to take the seal and bind it on the boy's arm.

Nine months later, Tahmina bears his child—a son, whom she names Sohrab. Years go by before Rostam and Sohrab finally meet—the war between Zabulistan and Turan is on the horizon. The two armies face each other and prepare for the imminent battle. By then, Sohrab has become known as the best fighter in the Turan army. But Rostam's legend precedes him and the Turan army cowers before the hero. No one else dares to fight Rostam, so Sohrab is sent to wrestle with the legendary hero. Though Sohrab knows his father's name, he is unaware that the man before him is Rostam. On the battlefield, Rostam and Sohrab fight for what seems like an eternity, neither knowing the true name of his opponent.

In the first fight, Sohrab defeats Rostam, but Rostam tricks Sohrab and says: “Young man, don't you know that the law of war is that you can kill me after defeating me twice?” Then, after praying to Dargah Yazdan, Rostam asks for his help in defeating the young warrior. In the second fight, after a very long and heavy bout of wrestling, Rostam breaks Sohrab's back and stabs him. Sohrab, now dying, tells Rostam that his father will avenge his death. He shows him the armband amulet Rostam once gave to Tahmina, who gave it to her son to keep him safe during the war, and only then does Rostam realize his identity. Rostam grieves heavily and sends Goudarz to get medicine (Panacea), but it comes too late. When Tahmina finds out her son is dead, she burns Sohrab's house and gives away all his riches. The story ends as "the breath departed from out her body, and her spirit went forth after Sohrab her son."

However, this is not the only plot, as the story of Rostam and Sohrab itself has undergone numerous adaptations.

== Adaptations ==
=== Literary Works ===
- Sohrab and Rustum (1853), by Matthew Arnold, English language.
- Rustom O Sohrab (1929), by Agha Hashar Kashmiri, Urdu language.

=== Drama / Opera and Music ===
- Rustam and Zohrab (1910), by Uzeyir Hajibeyov, Azerbaijani language.
- Sooge Sohrab (The Tragedy of Sohrab) (2014) (musical piece), by Sahba Aminikia, English language.

=== Films ===
- Rostam va Sohrab (1957), by Shahrok Rafi, Iranian film, Persian language.
- Rustom Sohrab (1963), by Vishram Bedekar, Indian Hindi language film starring Prithviraj, Premnath, Suraiyya and Mumtaz.
- Rustam and Zohrab (1971), by Boris Kimyagarov, Soviet Tajik film, Russian language.
- Sohrab Rustam (1994), by Mamtaz Ali, Bangladeshi Movie Bengali language.

Television / Stage Drama

- Sohrab Rustam (1990), by Riazuddin Badsah, Bangladeshi drama telecast by Bangladesh Television Bengali language.
- Rostam and Sohrab (1988), by Loris Tjeknavorian, Persian language.
- Dastan-e Rustam-ou Suhrab, a Tajik film produced by Benyamin Kimyagarov. The film plot differs from the story in some places. For example, Tahmineh comes to the battlefield trying to stop the fight; Rustam gives an arm band (not a necklace) large enough to only have fit his stout arms, and now only fit Sohrab's arm; and, Rustam uses a poisoned knife to stab his son.

=== Animated Adaptations ===
- Battle of the Kings: Rostam & Sohrab (2013) Iranian animation, by Kianoush Dalvand, Persian language. The film plot differs from the story, for example Sohrab is not dead at the end.

== Analysis ==
In the tale of “Rostam and Sohrab,” the author emphasizes that this tragedy did not stem solely from the inevitability of fate, but rather from the “hypocrisy and concealment” inherent in the characters' choices and actions. Superficially, the story's beginning and conclusion seem to reinforce a fatalistic tone, suggesting Sohrab's death was predestined. However, a close reading of Ferdowsi's deliberate crafting of dialogues and plot reveals how he actually exposes the responsibility borne by characters through their hypocrisy and silence.

In the tale of Rostam and Sohrab, nearly all major characters engage in deception and hypocrisy. Rostam's marriage to Tahmineh defies convention: he never brought his wife home after the wedding, neglected to seek out his potential offspring for twelve years despite knowing they existed, refused to reveal his identity in battle for fear of tarnishing his reputation, and ultimately killed his own son through deceit. Tahmineh concealed Sohrab's true origins for years, even hiding gifts and letters from his father. Sohrab, driven by recklessness and immaturity, attempted to overthrow Kay Kavus and usurp Afrasiab's throne. Afrasiab secretly plotted the father-son conflict, while Kay Kavus, consumed by jealousy, refused to grant the antidote. Hojir misled Sohrab with lies, Gordafarid escaped through deceit and provoked him, while Goudarz fabricated rumors to force Rostam back into battle. It was precisely the hypocrisy, concealment, and dishonesty of these characters at different levels that collectively wove this inevitable tragedy.

Historian Dariush Zolfaghari has argued that the Shahnameh presents warfare not merely as a struggle over territory, but also as a struggle over the survival of Iranian cultural identity and heritage. He emphasizes both Rostam and Sohrab as being a key character who is depicted as a military champion and as a protector of Iranian cultural continuity. His character is partially responsible for symbolically safeguarding Persian identity, customs, and political legitimacy. The epic is seen as both a literary work and a cultural model for preserving national heritage during and after a war, with both Rostam and Sohrab playing a key part in this analysis.

== See also ==
- Babruvahana, a character from the Indian epic Mahabharatam that the story of Rustom-Sohrab resembles, including the father-son duel, a bejewelled memento, and the lost horse.
- Aided Óenfhir Aífe
- Hildebrandslied
