= Rustam Sohrab =

1963 film

- Directed by: Vishram Bedekar
- Based on: Rostam and Sohrab in Shahnameh by Ferdowsi
- Produced by: F.U. Ramsay
- Starring: Suraiya; Prithviraj Kapoor; Prem Nath; Mumtaz
- Music by: Sajjad Hussain
- Release date: 1963
- Country: India
- Language: Hindi

Rustam Sohrab is a 1963 Indian Hindi-language film, produced by F.U. Ramsay and directed by Vishram Bedekar.

The film has Suraiya as the heroine (in the role of Shehzadi Tehmina) and Prithviraj Kapoor (in the role of Rustom Zabuli) as the hero. The story is based on the legendary poem of Rostam and Sohrab by Persian poet Ferdowsi. Prem Nath plays the role of Sohrab, Rustam's son and Mumtaz plays the role of Shahroo, Sohrab's love. The film has music by Sajjad Hussain.

It was the last film of Suraiya, after which she gave up acting and singing altogether. In the film, she sang her swan song "Ye kaisi ajab dastan ho gayi hai", which is regarded as one of her hit film songs.

== Cast ==
- Suraiya as Shehzadi Tehmina
- Prithviraj Kapoor as Rustom Zabuli
- Prem Nath as Sohrab
- Mumtaz as Shahroo

== Soundtrack ==
Song title	Sung By	Lyrics by	Music by	Film notes
"Ae Dilruba Ae Dilruba Nazrein Mila"	Lata Mangeshkar	Jan Nisar Akhtar	Sajjad Hussain	film Rustam Sohrab (1963)
"Yeh Kaisi Ajab Dastaan Ho Gayi Hai"	Suraiya	Qamar Jalalabadi	Sajjad Hussain	Rustam Sohrab (1963 film)
"Phir Tumhari Yaad Aayi Ae Sanam"	Mohammed Rafi, Manna Dey, Sadat Khan & chorus	Qamar Jalalabadi	Sajjad Hussain	film Rustam Sohrab (1963)
"Ab Der Ho Gayi Wallah"	Asha Bhosle	Qamar Jalalabadi	Sajjad Hussain	film Rustam Sohrab (1963)
"Mazandaran Mazandaran"	Talat Mahmood	Jan Nisar Akhtar	Sajjad Hussain	film Rustam Sohrab (1963)
