= Sohrab (disambiguation) =

Sohrab (Persian: سهراب) may refer to:

== People ==
- Sohrab, one of Shahnama's characters
- Sohrab Aarabi, Iranian man whose murder drew international attention to the 2009 Iranian election protests
- Sohrab Ahmari, an Iranian-American journalist
- Sohrab Bakhtiarizadeh, an Iranian football player
- Sohrab Entezari, Iranian retired footballer
- Sohrab Fakir, a Sufi singer
- Sohrab Kashani, Iranian artist
- Sohrab Khan Gorji (Georgian general), Georgian noble and a general of the Georgian army
- Sohrab Khan Gorji (Iranian commander), Iranian commander and chief of staff in the Qajar era of Georgian origin
- Sohrab Khan Gorji (Iranian treasurer), Iranian courtier, treasurer, and chief of customs in the Qajar era of Georgian origin
- Sohrab Mehmed Pasha, an Ottoman official
- Sohrab Modi (1897–1984), Indian theatre and film actor, director and producer
- Sohrab Pournazeri, Iranian musician and composer
- Sohrab Rahimi, was an Iranian poet
- Sohrab Sepehri, was a notable modern Iranian poet and a painter
- Sohrab Shahid-Sales, an Iranian film director
- Sohrab Pakzad, an Iranian singer, composer, and model.

=== surname ===
- Mirza Ahmad Sohrab (1890–1958), Persian-American author
- Ardeshir Burjorji Sorabji Godrej (1868–1936), Indian businessman co-founder of the Godrej Group

== Places ==
- Sohrab, Fars, a village in Fars Province, Iran
- Sohrab, Iran, a village in Kerman Province, Iran

== Businesses ==
- Sohrab Cycles, a Pakistani bicycle manufacturer
