= Craig Minassian =

American public relations specialist

Craig Minassian is the chief communications and marketing officer of the Clinton Foundation as well as a producer and the founder of the PR firm Minassian Media. During the presidency of Bill Clinton he served as assistant press secretary and director of television news in the White House.

== Career ==
Minassian graduated from the University of Miami in 1992. Having interned for various entertainment and sporting events during his studies, he joined HBO after college, working on programs such as Comic Relief, Politically Incorrect with Bill Maher and the organizing committee for World Cup USA 94.

Minassian's work on various campaigns led to his serving as assistant press secretary and director of television news in the White House for President Bill Clinton. Over the years, Minassian worked on the 1996 Clinton/Gore campaign as well as Hillary Clinton's 2008 presidential campaign and served as a senior advisor to the Democratic National Convention Committees in 2008 and 2012. At the end of Clinton's presidency, he returned to HBO to produce and develop programming and served as festival director of the U.S. Comedy Arts Festival. Minassian joined the Clinton Foundation in 2005, and founded the Minassian Media PR company in 2006.

In 2010, Minassian was one of the organizers of the Rally to Restore Sanity and/or Fear. Minassian Media produced the live event portion of the event together with Chris Wayne, another veteran of Clinton's 1996 presidential campaign.

Minassian is an executive producer, together with Will Malnati, of Bill Clinton's podcast on iHeartMedia's iHeartPodcast network titled Why am I Telling You This. Clients of his PR firm include the Clinton Global Initiative, Comedy Central's The Daily Show, Bloomberg and the Wikimedia Foundation.

== Personal life ==
Asked how he got his start in his career, Minassian told Politico: "My mom served in Ralph Bunche’s office at the United Nations and on the support staff for U.N. peacekeeping forces in the Congo. She instilled in me a real interest in the role the U.S., international institutions and the media play in the world. I was also fascinated by comedy that put society through a provocative, honest prism such as 'M*A*S*H.'"

Minassian is married to Shawna Shepherd, a producer on The Daily Show; they had a daughter in 2014.
