= Loris Tjeknavorian =

Iranian Armenian composer and conductor (born 1937)

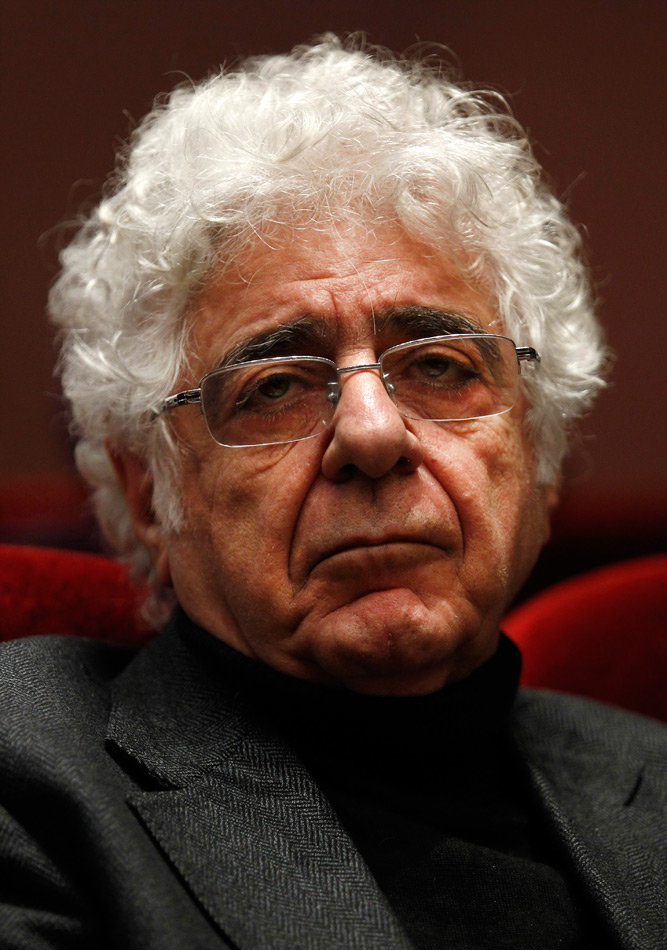
- Tjeknavorian in 2014
- Born: Լորիս Ճգնավորյան; 13 October 1937 (age 88); Boroujerd, Imperial State of Iran
- Education: University of Michigan
- Occupations: Composer and Conductor
- Years active: 1960–present
- Known for: Principal Conductor of Armenian Philharmonic Orchestra
- Children: 3 (including Emmanuel)

Loris Haykasi Tjeknavorian (Armenian: Լորիս Ճգնավորյան; Persian: لوریس چکناواریان; born 13 October 1937) is an Iranian Armenian composer and conductor. He has appeared internationally as a conductor, serving as the principal conductor of the Armenian Philharmonic Orchestra from 1989 to 1998 and later from 1999 to 2000. As a composer Tjeknavorian has written 6 operas, 5 symphonies, choral works, chamber music, ballet music, piano and vocal works, concerti for piano, violin, guitar, cello and pipa, as well as music for documentary and feature films. Among his best known works are the opera Rostam and Sohrab, based on the story of Rostam and Sohrab from Ferdowsi's Shahnameh, and the ballet Simorgh.

After study at the Vienna Music Academy, with Carl Orff at the Salzburg Mozarteum and the University of Michigan, he taught at the Tehran Conservatory. While based in the United Kingdom 1975 to 1985, he was a frequent conductor with various London orchestras and appeared internationally with orchestras in Iran, Israel, Japan, the Soviet Union and the United States. His early compositions evoke the work of Aram Khachaturian, while his oeuvre as a whole is heavily influenced by Armenian folk and sacred music.

He has made some 100 recordings with RCA, Philips, EMI, ASV, and others.

== Early years (1937–1969) ==
Tjeknavorian was born on 13 October 1937 in Boroujerd, Iran, to an Armenian‑immigrant family. Tjeknavorian's early life was succinctly chronicled in the London magazine Gramophone in 1976:

"His father came from Eastern Armenia and his mother had fled from Western Armenia during the 1915 Armenian genocide... Influenced by three cultures, Armenian, Iranian and Western, he benefited from a cosmopolitan upbringing. His grandfather, a doctor, liked to play the violin and as a boy Loris enjoyed listening to professional string-players (Russian, Armenian or Polish immigrants) in local cafés. Although not themselves musical, his parents wanted all three children (one boy, two girls) to play musical instruments. Eight-year-old Loris was given a violin. Despite the lack of a teacher, the boy began to study in earnest; before long he had composed a number of piano pieces, with no formal instruction whatsoever. At 16 he formed a four-part choir and organized and conducted his own orchestra in Teheran.

A year later he was ready to leave for the Vienna Academy of Music as a violin and composition student. (Gramophone, November 1976) While a student there, he wrote a concerto for violin and string orchestra. It was written “in a short time frame in a state of intoxication” in 1956. His violin teacher, Hans-Joachim Drevo, was so impressed by it that he was the soloist for the work's première.

Tjeknavorian graduated with honours and shortly thereafter, the Austrian music publisher Doblinger published four of his piano compositions as well as his Ballet Fantastique for three pianos, celeste and percussion in Vienna.

Following this fruitful period of education, Tjeknavorian went back to Iran in 1961, where he taught music theory at the Tehran Conservatory of Music. At the same time, he was appointed director of Tehran's Music Archives and put in charge of collecting and researching traditional and modern Iranian folk music and instruments. He mounted the first Archives exhibition to great success, and began work on an opera based on the epic poem of Rostam and Sohrab.

Tjeknavorian returned to Austria in 1963 to further his studies in Salzburg at the Mozarteum. There, he met the renowned composer Carl Orff, who was to become the young musician's mentor and enthusiastic supporter. On hearing Tjeknavorian play sections of his opera Rostam and Sohrab, Orff offered him a full one-year scholarship to stay in Salzburg to complete the first draft of the opera. In addition, Orff commissioned Tjeknavorian to compose piano music based on Armenian music for the Schulwerk, Orff's system for teaching music. Tjeknavorian composed over 130 short pieces for beginning to advanced students. These are collected in two volumes called Kaleidoscope for Piano, portions of which were also published by Schott as Bilder Aus Armenia (Pictures from Armenia).

Tjeknavorian moved to the United States in 1965, where he began to study conducting at the University of Michigan. From 1966 to 1967 he was appointed composer-in-residence at Concordia College in Moorhead, Minnesota, and from 1966 to 1970 head of the instrumental and opera departments at Moorhead University in Minnesota.

== Back in Iran (1970–1975) ==
In 1970, the Cultural Ministry of Iran offered Tjeknavorian the positions of composer-in-residence and principal conductor at the Rudaki Opera House in Tehran. While there he conducted a number of major operas, including his own Pardis and Parisa.

Tjeknavorian's extensive study of the technical aspects of traditional Iranian instruments culminated with the composition of the dance-drama Simorgh, the first polyphonic composition scored entirely for Iranian instruments and based on themes from Zoroastrian myth and Persian mystical poetry. Following sold-out performances of the ballet in Tehran, the suite from Simorgh was recorded and released as an LP in London by Unicorn in 1975 to great critical acclaim. Writing about his unique compositional style, Gramophone praised the piece as "strangely beautiful".

In Tehran, Tjeknavorian's talents found huge demand, and he soon became the leading composer of film music in Iran, scoring some 30 scores for documentaries and short and popular feature films, many of them classics of pre-revolutionary Iranian cinema. Among them was the award-winning film Bita, starring Iranian singing and acting legend Googoosh, released in 1972. That same year Tjeknavorian received the Homayoun Order and Medal for Persepolis, his score for the spectacular Son et Lumiere show at the ancient Persian capital. The audience consisted of dignitaries and heads of state from around the world that had gathered in Iran for the 2500th anniversary of the Persian Empire. The show was a highlight of the unprecedented event, and was followed by the release of the score by Philipps.

== Back in the West (1975–1987) ==
In 1975, Tjeknavorian relocated to London where he signed an exclusive conducting contract with the RCA recording company. His first release was the hugely acclaimed recording of Tchaikovsky's Symphony No. 6 ("Pathetique") with the LSO, hailed in Gramophone as "bold and exciting" and by RCA as "an astounding performance of electrifying passion and nobility".

Tjeknavorian's sudden impact on the international music scene in London created a furor, with RCA running two-page advertisement in Gramophone proclaiming him "the greatest conductor of his generation". Attended by talk-of-the-town performances at venues such as the Royal Festival Hall, Tjeknavorian followed this early success with a series of similarly acclaimed recordings with the London Symphony Orchestra, the Royal Philharmonic Orchestra and the London Philharmonic Orchestra, including ground-breaking interpretations of Sibelius, Stravinsky, Shostakovich, Dvorak, and Borodin. Tjeknavorian's also quickly established himself as the world's foremost interpreter of the symphonic music of Aram Khachaturian. His recording of the complete score of the ballet Gayaneh, the first and only of its kind, was hailed by the London critics as "first class" and "the most distinguished of the RCA recordings made by Loris Tjeknavorian" (Gramophone, April 1977 and June 1983).

In 1978, Tjeknavorian organized Music Armenia, described in Gramophone as "the first Armenian Festival on foreign soil. During the day there were symposiums, conferences and comparative studies of Armenian music, and in the evening, concerts presenting Armenian artists and composers." Speaking to the London magazine, Tjeknavorian explained: "Being Christian, the first thing the Armenians did...was to translate the Bible as early as the fourth century AD. Then they started writing music in the fifth century. As soon as the alphabet was created, the chants started to be written down in old neumes. By the eighteenth century they could no longer decipher these neumes, so the musicians got together and renotated all the different chants. When I was studying in Vienna I discovered the Armenian Monastery there, and found a wealth of these chants. I became so involved in searching through all the manuscripts, it took me 15 years, and I found seven different traditions amounting to something like 30,000 melodies... It was far removed from my original idea of having the melodies just for my own compositional use, and I realized that it was of immense interest to musicologists" (Gramophone, May 1979). For his long and dedicated work Tjeknavorian was awarded the Order of "Gregory the Illuminator" by the late Catholicos Vazgen I.

Taking some of the medieval chants he had rediscovered, Tjeknavorian composed the vocal work Life of Christ, first performed during the Festival at the Queen Elizabeth Hall by the Ambrosian Singers. Many of Tjeknavorian's most important compositions were written in this fruitful and personally difficult ten-year period culminating with, and immediately following, the Iranian Revolution in 1979. Foremost among his works during this time are his Second Symphony (Credo) and the oratorio The Book of Revelations, the second and third parts respectively of his trilogy on the Armenian genocide begun with his groundbreaking First Symphony (Requiem for the Massacred) scored for trumpet and percussion and released in London by Unicorn in 1976. Another key work towards the end of this period was his ballet Othello, commissioned by the Northern Ballet Company and premiered in London in 1985 with Princess Ann in attendance. The recording of the piece released that year on EMI with the London Symphony Orchestra was praised by Gramophone as "enormously effective" (Gramophone, November 1985).

== Armenia (1989–2000) ==
Soon after settling in New York City in 1986, Tjeknavorian's destiny was diverted by the devastating Armenian earthquake of December 1988. In response, Tjeknavorian organized a benefit concert at Carnegie Hall to raise relief funds for the victims. The concert featured Plácido Domingo, Mstislav Rostropovich, Alexander Toradze and stars of the New York Metropolitan Opera, including Mirella Freni, Frederica von Stade, Samuel Ramey and Elena Obraztsova. Ticket sales for the event raised $500,000 that was sent to Armenia, where Tjeknavorian relocated a few months later, having been appointed principal conductor and artistic director of the Armenian Philharmonic Orchestra (APO) in Yerevan.

For Tjeknavorian, the most important task was rebuilding the cultural life of Gyumri (then Leninakan), Armenia's second largest city, which had been devastated by the earthquake. In 1991 Tjeknavorian announced his intention to go on a pilgrimage walk from Yerevan to Gyumri in order to raise funds for rebuilding efforts. Thousands of people joined him along the way and a huge percentage of the Armenian population donated money for the cause. Fifteen million rubles, worth around 20 million dollars at the time, were collected nationwide. Unfortunately, several months later the Soviet ruble was devalued and Tjeknavorian was compelled to seek additional money from private sources. Tjeknavorian took over the huge communist party headquarters, which had been destroyed, and in seven years transformed it into the first Academy of Music and Arts in Gyumri. During this time, his fundraising led to the founding of a symphony orchestra, wind ensemble, choir and dance ensemble, the renovation of the theater and restarting of the Gyumri TV station, and purchasing musical instruments for the orchestra and band, whose instruments had all been destroyed in the earthquake, as well as ten grand pianos for the Arts and Music Academy.

Tjeknavorian was also instrumental in the 1991 campaign for Armenian independence. Through his tours in various Armenian cities and an all-night televised performance on national television two days before the measure passed on September 21, 1991, Tjeknavorian managed to increase the "Yes" vote for independence from 30 to 96 per cent. Given the heated controversy and popular passions surrounding the question of independence, the peaceful nature of the victory was unique, reached by Tjeknavorian through the power of music and a positive cultural message.

Following independence, Tjeknavorian served on the committee to reinstate the pre-communist Armenian flag and the national coat-of-arms. He was especially influential in the adoption of the national anthem, "Mer Hayrenik" (Our Fatherland), for which he rewrote the words for the first stanza. During the crippling energy blockade between 1992 and 1995 - a result of the Karabakh war - the capital was gripped by shortages of food, water, heat and electricity. Faithful to his vow that "the doors of culture must never be closed", Tjeknavorian maintained weekly concerts at this time, including a regular series of spiritual music concerts every Saturday in anticipation of the 1700th anniversary of Christianity in Armenia.

During his eleven-year collaboration with the APO, his recordings with the orchestra for ORF (the Austrian radio and television station) and ASV (an English recording company) achieved worldwide recognition; they frequently toured Europe, the United States, Canada, Iran and Lebanon. For three successive years, from 1991 to 1993, the APO was the resident orchestra in the ORF benefit program Licht Ins Dunkel in Vienna.

== Iran (2000 – present) ==
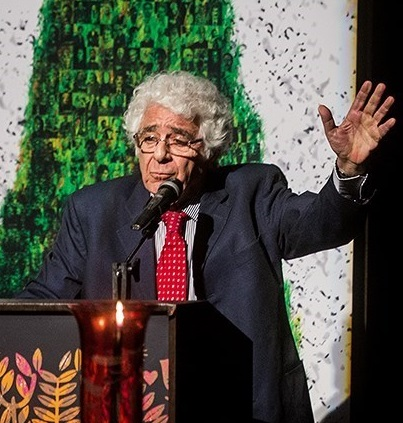
Loris Tjeknavorian speaking in Cheragh Khamosh Nist conference in Iranshahr Hall in Tehran

In 2000, Tjeknavorian resigned from the APO in order to devote more time to composing. During this period he also conducted the Vienna Symphony Orchestra, and performed at the San Francisco Opera House, the Contemporary Music Festival and at the Vienna Music Festival in Hong Kong and Bangkok. He conducted the Austrian premiere of his opera Rostam and Sohrab at the Festspielhaus in St. Pölten.

From 2009 to the present, Tjeknavorian has continued to devote his time to composing, as well as painting and writing short stories. Among his most recent works are the operas Zahak (libretto based on Ferdowsi's Shahnameh) and Mowlana and Shams-e Tabriz (libretto based on the poetry of Rumi), as well as the chamber opera "The Final Hour of Sadegh Hedayat" (libretto based on "The Blind Owl" and other works by the Iranian writer Sadegh Hedayat). Other works include his second concerto for violin and chamber orchestra, a work for solo piano titled "1915", and two major symphonic suites: King Cyrus, about the ancient Persian king, and Takhti, dedicated to the celebrated Iranian wrestler. Tjeknavorian's paintings were exhibited at the Gallery Shirin in Tehran, Gallery Maryam Seyhoun in Los Angeles, and twice at the House of the Artists in Tehran. He has published and presented a sarcastic book under the title of The Land of Asses which is a collection of satiric short stories. Tjeknavarian the man with a humorous disposition has depicted a land that is run by the asses.

On 20 December 2008, Tjeknavorian recorded Hafez Nazeri's The night of Angel (yet to be released) with the London Symphony orchestra.

Tjeknavorian's recent performances include benefit concerts in Tehran and Los Angeles for the organization MAHAK on behalf of children with cancer, a series of concerts with the Armenian Chamber Orchestra at the Talar Vahdat Hall in Tehran, a performance of his Ararat Suite with the Sacramento Symphony, and the world premiere of his King Cyrus symphonic suite with the San Francisco Philharmonic Orchestra in August 2013. In 2011 the Iranian BARBAD recording company issued a 20-CD box set of Tjerknavorian's major works (symphonies, choral works, ballet, chamber music, operas, etc.) plus 2 DVDs of his opera Rostam & Sohrab.

During an interview on the occasion of his 81st birthday, Tjeknavorian said to the journalist of IRNA: "Iran is my homeland. My ancestors have lived in this land. I’ve been born in Iran and will be buried here. I'm emotionally and culturally attached to every inch of this country and feel at home in nowhere except for Iran."

In 2026, at 88 years old, Tjeknavorian received Armenian citizenship. Upon receiving it, he said, "“Although the people accept me, it would have been good for me to have my homeland’s passport as well. I applied, and thank God, my dream came true."

== Armenian Philharmonic ==
In 1989, Tjeknavorian was appointed Principal Conductor and artistic director of the Armenian Philharmonic Orchestra (APO). During his eleven years collaboration with the APO, his recordings for ORF (the Austrian radio and television station) and ASV (an English recording company) achieved worldwide recognition, they frequently toured Europe, the United States, Canada, Iran and Lebanon. In three successive years, from 1991 to 1993, the APO was the resident orchestra in the ORF benefit program "Licht ins Dunkel" ("Light into the Darkness") in Vienna. However, in 2000, Tjeknavorian resigned from this position in order to be able to devote more time to composing and conducting other orchestras.

== Awards ==
- Top Art Medal (June 20, 2002)
- In a ceremony in Vahdat Hall, awarded Iran's highest performing arts medal by Minister of Culture A. Masjedjamei
- Two "Golden Harp Awards" for Highest Artistic Achievement in the 15th and 16th "FAJR" Music Festival in Teheran
- Honorary Professor, Komitas Conservatory, Yerevan
- For services to church music, first recipient of the Cultural Order of "St. Mesrop Mashtotz", conferred by Vazken I, Supreme Catholicos of all Armenians
- Government Order for services supporting earthquake recovery, from Prime Minister Oskanian of the Armenian SSR
- "Khorenatsi" Medal for cultural services to Armenia
- Golden Cross of the Rumanian Church
- BBC Music Magazine Top 1000 CDs Guide
- Gold Medal from University of Armenia
- Macedonian Silver Orb, conferred by Bishop Bartolomeus I of Constantinople, Ecumenical Patriarch of the Eastern Orthodox Churches
- EMG Art of Record Buying Recommendation
- EMG Golden Art of Record Buying Recommendation
- Gramophone Classical Good CD Guide
- Gramophone Critics' Choice
- Gramophone Editor's Choice
- Gramophone Recommended Recording
- Hi-Fi World Record of the Month
- High Fidelity Critics' Choice
- Penguin Guide to Compact Discs *** Outstanding performance and recording
- Records & Recording Pick of the Month, Pick of the Year
- Homayoon Order and Medal for composition of Son et Lumiere Persepolis 2500
- Golden Conducting Baton for Artistic Achievement from the Armenian Philharmonic Choir
- Golden Cultural Medal from the Armenian Ministry of Culture

== Filmography ==
- 1983: Armenian Philharmonic Orchestra & conductor Loris Tjeknavorian - (Tours in Austria, Germany, Greece) ARM TV 108min. Director cameraman Levon Mkrtchyan The script of film Hrachuhi Taturyan
- 1991: Pilgrimage To Gyumri
- 1998: Armenian Philharmonic in Baalbek - conductor Loris Tjeknavorian, director Levon Mkrtchyan
- 2000: Rostam and Sohrab - Opera statement in Iran, Tehran, director cameraman Levon Mkrtchyan

== See also ==
- Music of Iran
- List of Iranians
- Persian Symphonic Music
- Rostam and Sohrab (opera)
- Kayvan Mirhadi

Preceded by Vahagn Papian	Principal Conductor, Armenian Philharmonic Orchestra; 1989–1998	Succeeded by Michael Avetissian
Preceded by Michael Avetissian	Principal Conductor, Armenian Philharmonic Orchestra; 1999–2000	Succeeded by Eduard Topchjan
