= Clinton Foundation =

American non-profit organization

- Bill, Hillary & Chelsea Clinton Foundation
- Founded: 2001; 25 years ago
- Founder: Bill Clinton
- Type: Nonprofit
- Tax ID no.: 31-1580204
- Legal status: 501(c)(3) organization
- Location(s): New York, New York; Little Rock, Arkansas
- Key people: Bill Clinton (2001–present); Hillary Clinton (2013–2015); Chelsea Clinton (2011–present); Donna Shalala (president, 2015–2017); Eric Braverman (president, 2013–2015); Bruce Lindsey (president, 2004–2011); Skip Rutherford (president, 1997–2004); Ira Magaziner (head of Clinton Health Access Initiative); Doug Band (originator of Clinton Global Initiative)
- Revenue: $20 million (2018)
- Endowment: $292,393,055 (2018)
- Employees: 2,000 (2015)
- Website: www.clintonfoundation.org
- Formerly called: William J. Clinton Presidential Foundation

The Clinton Foundation (founded in 2001 as the William J. Clinton Presidential Foundation, and renamed in 2013 as the Bill, Hillary & Chelsea Clinton Foundation) is a nonprofit organization under section 501(c)(3) of the U.S. tax code. It was established by former president of the United States Bill Clinton with the stated mission to "strengthen the capacity of people in the United States and throughout the world to meet the challenges of global interdependence." Its offices are located in New York City and Little Rock, Arkansas.

Through 2016, the foundation had raised an estimated $2 billion from U.S. corporations, foreign governments and corporations, political donors, and various other groups and individuals. The acceptance of funds from wealthy donors has been a source of controversy. The foundation "has won accolades from philanthropy experts and has drawn bipartisan support". Charitable grants are not a major focus of the Clinton Foundation, which instead uses most of its money to carry out its own humanitarian programs.

This foundation is a public organization to which anyone may donate and is distinct from the Clinton Family Foundation, a private organization for personal Clinton family philanthropy.

According to the Clinton Foundation's website, neither Bill Clinton nor his daughter, Chelsea Clinton (both are members of the governing board), draws any salary or receives any income from the foundation. When Hillary Clinton was a board member, she reportedly also received no income from the foundation.

Beginning in 2015, the foundation was accused of wrongdoing, including a bribery and pay-to-play scheme, but multiple investigations through 2019 found no evidence of malfeasance. The New York Times reported in September 2020 that a federal prosecutor appointed by attorney general Bill Barr to investigate the origins of the 2016 FBI Crossfire Hurricane investigation had also sought documents and interviews regarding how the FBI handled an investigation into the Clinton Foundation. In May 2023, it was revealed that the Justice Department had continued to investigate the Foundation until days before the end of the first Trump presidency, when FBI officials insisted the DOJ acknowledge in writing that there was no case to bring.

== History ==
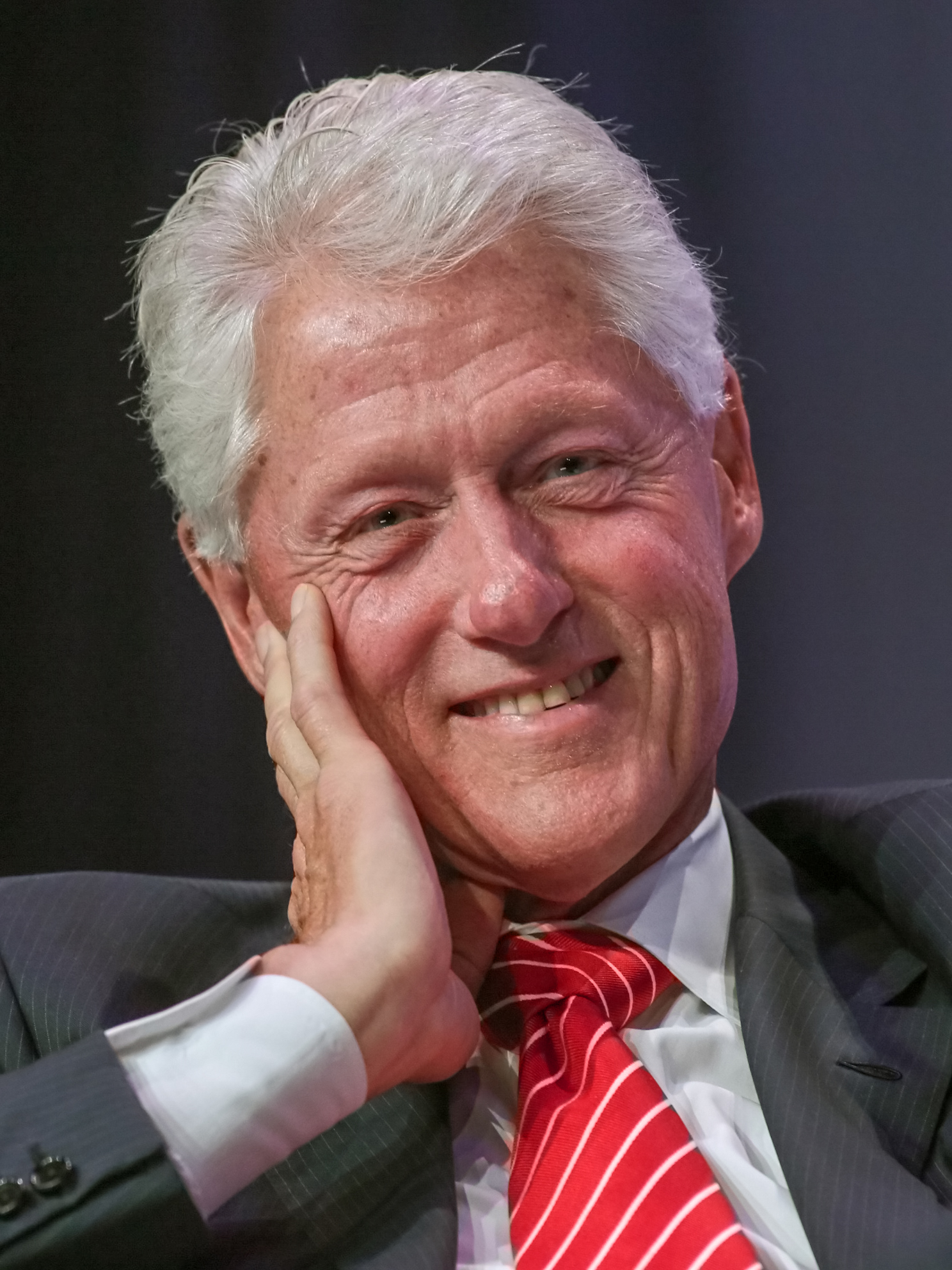
Former president of the United States Bill Clinton

The origins of the foundation go back to 1997, when then-president Bill Clinton was focused mostly on fundraising for the future Clinton Presidential Center in Little Rock, Arkansas. He founded the William J. Clinton Foundation in 2001, following the completion of his presidency. Longtime Clinton advisor Bruce Lindsey became the CEO in 2004. Later, Lindsey moved from being CEO to being chair, largely for health reasons. Other Clinton hands who played an important early role included Doug Band and Ira Magaziner. Additional Clinton associates who have had senior positions at the foundation include John Podesta and Laura Graham.

The foundation's success is spurred by Bill Clinton's worldwide fame and his ability to bring together corporate executives, celebrities, and government officials. Similarly, the foundation areas of involvement have often corresponded to whatever Bill suddenly felt an interest in.

Preceding Barack Obama's 2009 nomination of Hillary Clinton as United States Secretary of State, Bill Clinton agreed to accept a number of conditions and restrictions regarding his ongoing activities and fundraising efforts for the Clinton Presidential Center and the Clinton Global Initiative. Accordingly, a list of donors was released in December 2008.

By 2011, Chelsea Clinton was taking a dominant role in the foundation and had a seat on its board. To raise money for the foundation, she gave paid speeches, such as her $65,000 2014 address at the University of Missouri in Kansas City for the opening of the Starr Women's Hall of Fame.

In 2013, Hillary Clinton joined the foundation following her tenure as Secretary of State. She planned to focus her work on issues regarding women and children, as well as economic development. Accordingly, at that point, it was renamed the "Bill, Hillary & Chelsea Clinton Foundation". Extra attention was paid to the foundation due to the 2016 United States presidential election, Hillary resigned from the board of the Clinton Foundation in April 2015.

In July 2013, Eric Braverman was named CEO of the foundation. He is a friend and former colleague of Chelsea Clinton from McKinsey & Company. At the same time, Chelsea Clinton was named vice chair of the foundation's board. The foundation was also in the midst of a move to two floors of the Time-Life Building in Midtown Manhattan.

Chelsea Clinton moved the organization to an outside review, conducted by the firm of Simpson Thacher & Bartlett. Its conclusions were made public in mid-2013. The main focus was to determine how the foundation could achieve firm financial footing that was not dependent upon the former president's fundraising abilities, how it could operate more like a permanent entity rather than a start-up organization, and thus how it could survive and prosper beyond Bill Clinton's lifetime. Dennis Cheng, a former Hillary Clinton campaign official and State Department deputy chief, was named to oversee a $250 million endowment drive. The review also found the management and structure of the foundation needed improvements, including an increase in the size of its board of directors that would have a more direct involvement in planning and budget activities. Additionally, the review said that all employees needed to understand the foundation's conflict of interest policies and that expense reports needed a more formal review process.

In January 2015, Braverman announced his resignation. Politico attributed the move to being "partly from a power struggle inside the foundation between and among the coterie of Clinton loyalists who have surrounded the former president for decades and who helped start and run the foundation." He was succeeded at first in an acting capacity by former deputy assistant secretary, Maura Pally.

On February 18, 2015, The Washington Post reported that, "the foundation has won accolades from philanthropy experts and has drawn bipartisan support, with members of the George W. Bush administration often participating in its programs." In March 2015, former Secretary of Health and Human Services in the Clinton administration, Donna Shalala, was selected to run the Clinton Foundation. She left in April 2017.

In August 2016, The Boston Globe's editorial board suggested that the Clinton Foundation cease accepting donations. The Globe's editorial board offered praise for the foundation's work but added that "as long as either of the Clintons are in public office, or actively seeking it, they should not operate a charity, too" because it represents a conflict of interest and a political distraction.

In 2016, Reuters reported that the Clinton Foundation suspected that it had been the target of a cyber security breach. As a consequence of the suspected cyber security breach, Clinton Foundation officials retained a security firm, FireEye, to evaluate its data systems. The cyber security breach has been described as sharing similarities with cyberattacks that targeted other institutions, such as the Democratic National Committee.

In October 2016, The Wall Street Journal reported that four FBI field offices—in New York, Los Angeles, Washington, and Little Rock—had been collecting information about the Clinton Foundation to determine whether "there was evidence of financial crimes or influence-peddling". In a reported separate investigation, the Washington field office was investigating Terry McAuliffe before he became a board member of the Clinton Foundation. CNN reported in January 2018, that the FBI is investigating allegations of corruption at the Clinton Foundation in Arkansas. Sources said that federal prosecutors are checking to see if foundation donors were improperly promised policy favors or special access to Hillary Clinton during her tenure as secretary of state in return for donations and whether tax-exempt funds were misused by the foundation's leadership. The Washington Post reported in January 2020, that an additional Justice Department investigation into the matter, initiated after Donald Trump took office in 2017, was winding down after finding nothing worth pursuing.

== Board of directors ==
As of January 2018, the board members are:

- Bill Clinton, chairman
- Chelsea Clinton, vice chair
- Frank Giustra
- Rolando Gonzalez-Bunster
- Eric Goosby
- Hadeel Ibrahim
- Lisa Jackson
- Bruce Lindsey, counselor to the chair
- Cheryl Mills
- Donna Shalala

== Programs and initiatives ==
=== Clinton Health Access Initiative (CHAI) ===
As of January 1, 2010, the Clinton HIV/AIDS Initiative, an initiative of the Clinton Foundation, became a separate nonprofit organization called the Clinton Health Access Initiative (CHAI). Organizations such as the Clinton Foundation continue to supply anti-malarial drugs to Africa and other affected areas; according to director Inder Singh, in 2011 more than 12 million individuals will be supplied with subsidized anti-malarial drugs.

In May 2007, CHAI and UNITAID announced agreements that help middle-income and low-income countries save money on second-line drugs. The partnership also reduced the price of a once-daily first-line treatment to less than $1 per day. To procure these low-cost drugs, Bill Clinton repeatedly visited Indian manufacturers of generic drugs, which helped legitimize India's pharmaceutical industry.

CHAI was spun off into a separate organization in 2010; Ira Magaziner became its CEO (he had been a key figure in the Clinton health care plan of 1993). Chelsea Clinton joined its board in 2011, as did Tachi Yamada, former president of the Global Health Program at the Bill & Melinda Gates Foundation.

=== Clinton Global Initiative (CGI) and CGI U ===
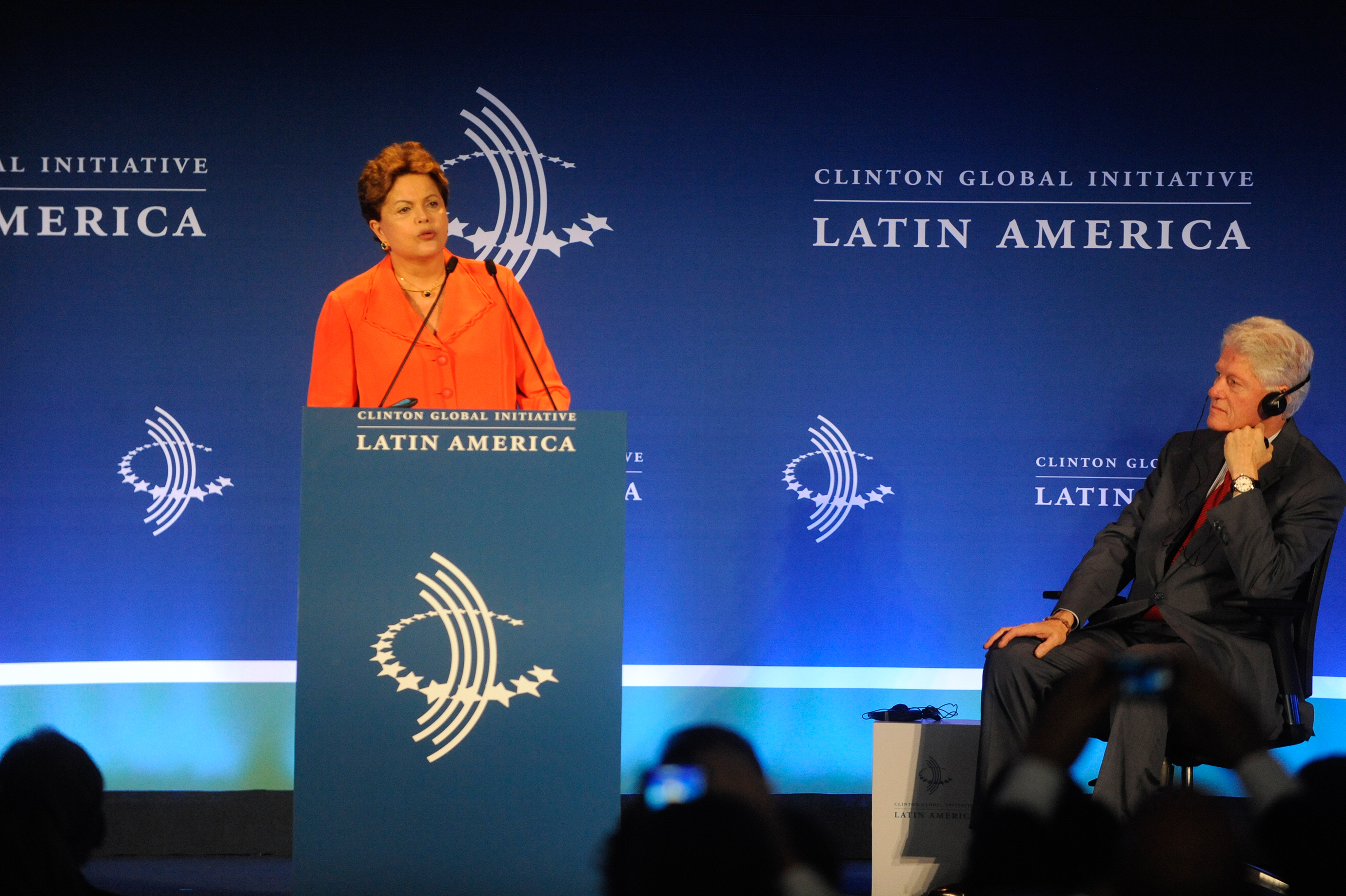
President of Brazil Dilma Rousseff opens Clinton Global Initiative Latin America in Rio de Janeiro, 2013.

The Clinton Global Initiative (CGI) was founded in 2005 by Bill Clinton. Doug Band, counselor to Bill, was integral to its formation. Clinton has credited Band with being the originator of CGI and has noted that "Doug had the idea to do this." Band left his paid position at CGI in 2010, preferring to emphasize his Teneo business and family pursuits, but remains on the CGI advisory board. The overlap between CGI and Teneo, of which Bill was a paid advisor, drew criticism. According to his attorneys during 2007 plea negotiations on sex offense charges, financier Jeffrey Epstein also formed "part of the original group that conceived the Clinton Global Initiative", though his name was not mentioned in any of the organization's founding documents.

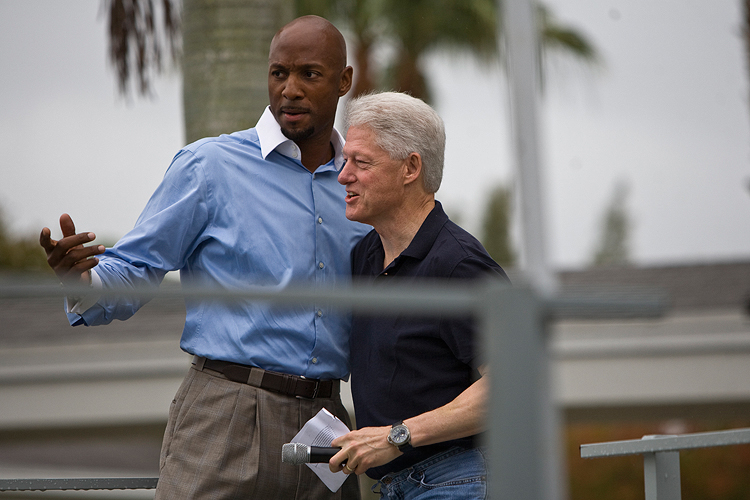
Bill Clinton with Alonzo Mourning during CGI University Day of Service in Miami, Florida

In 2007, Bill started CGI U, which expanded the model of CGI to students, universities, and national youth organizations. CGI U has been held at Tulane University, the University of Texas at Austin, the University of Miami, the University of California, San Diego, The George Washington University, Washington University in St. Louis, Arizona State University, and the University of California, Berkeley. Panelists and speakers have included Jon Stewart, Madeleine Albright, Vandana Shiva, Bill and Chelsea Clinton, Stephen Colbert, Jack Dorsey, Greg Stanton, U.S. rep. Gabby Giffords, Shane Battier, Salman Khan (founder of Khan Academy), and U.S. rep. John Lewis.

In September 2016, it was announced that the Initiative would be winding down to be discontinued and that 74 employees would be let go at the end of the year. In January 2017, it was announced that another 22 employees would be let go by April 15, 2017, and that CGI University would be continued.

=== Clinton Global Citizen Awards ===
The Clinton Global Citizen Awards are a set of awards which have been given by the Clinton Global Initiative every year since 2007. The awards are given to individuals who, in the opinion of the Clinton Foundation, are "outstanding individuals who exemplify global citizenship through their vision and leadership". Past recipients of the award include Mexican businessman and philanthropist Carlos Slim, Irish billionaire Denis O'Brien, Moroccan entrepreneur Mohammad Abbad Andaloussi, Rwandan president Paul Kagame, Afghan women's rights activist Suraya Pakzad, Dominican Republic president Leonel Fernández, and Pakistani labor rights activist Syeda Ghulam Fatima.

=== Clinton Climate Initiative (CCI) ===
In August 2006, Bill Clinton started a program to fight climate change, the Clinton Foundation's Climate Initiative (CCI). The CCI directly runs various programs to prevent deforestation and to rehabilitate forests and other landscapes worldwide, develop clean energy, and help island nations threatened by rising ocean levels.

On August 1, 2006, the foundation entered into a partnership with the Large Cities Climate Leadership Group, agreeing to provide resources to allow the participating cities to enter into an energy-saving product purchasing consortium and to provide technical and communications support.

In May 2007, CCI announced its first project which will help some large cities cut greenhouse gas emissions by facilitating retrofitting of existing buildings. Five large banks committed $1 billion each to help cities and building owners make energy-saving improvements aimed at lowering energy use and energy costs. At the 2007 Clinton Global Initiative, Bill Clinton announced the 1Sky campaign to accelerate bold federal policy on global warming. The 1Sky campaign supports at least an 80% reduction in climate pollution levels by 2050.

On May 19, 2009, CCI announced the global Climate Positive Development Program where it will work with the U.S. Green Building Council to promote "climate positive" city growth.

Norway and Germany are among the countries co-financing projects with the CCI in numerous developing and third-world countries.

=== Clinton Development Initiative (CDI) ===
The Clinton Development Initiative, originally the Clinton Hunter Development Initiative, was formed in 2006 as a partnership with Scottish philanthropist Sir Tom Hunter's Hunter Foundation to target the root causes of poverty in Africa and promote sustainable economic growth.

=== The Alliance for a Healthier Generation ===
The Alliance for a Healthier Generation is a partnership between the Clinton Foundation and the American Heart Association that was working to end the childhood obesity epidemic in the United States by 2010.

The Robert Wood Johnson Foundation, which provided an initial $8 million to start the Healthy Schools Program, awarded a $20 million grant to expand the program to over 8,000 schools in states with the highest obesity rates.

At the industry level, the Alliance struck agreements with major food and beverage manufacturers to provide kids with nutritional options, and established nutrition guidelines for school vending machines, stores and cafeterias to promote healthy eating. Some of the companies involved in these efforts are Coca-Cola, Cadbury plc, Campbell's, Groupe Danone, Kraft Foods, Mars and PepsiCo.

=== Clinton Giustra Sustainable Growth Initiative ===
Established in 2007 with Canadian mining executive Frank Giustra — founder of the petroleum company Pacific Rubiales (renamed Pacific Exploration & Production in 2015) — CGSGI describes itself as "pioneering an innovative approach to poverty alleviation." Giustra's involvement with the Clinton Foundation has been criticized by the International Business Times, The Washington Post, and the American Media Institute because it was accompanied by a sudden reversal in Hillary Clinton's position while Secretary of State concerning the United States–Colombia Free Trade Agreement, an agreement which she had previously opposed "as bad for labor rights."

=== Clinton Health Matters Initiative (CHMI) ===
In November 2012, Bill Clinton announced the launch of the Clinton Health Matters Initiative (CHMI). CHMI is a national initiative, building on the Clinton Foundation's work on global health and childhood obesity, that works to improve the health and well-being of people across the United States by activating individuals, communities, and organizations to make meaningful contributions to the health of others. CHMI holds an annual Health Matters conference every January in the Coachella Valley.

=== Disaster relief ===
The foundation has funded extensive disaster relief programs following the 2004 Indian Ocean earthquake and Hurricane Katrina in 2005. Shortly after Hurricane Katrina hit, President George W. Bush asked former Presidents George H. W. Bush and Bill Clinton to raise funds to help rebuild the Gulf Coast region. The two Presidents, having worked together to assist victims of the Indian Ocean tsunami, established the Bush-Clinton Katrina Fund to identify and meet the unmet needs in the region, foster economic opportunity, and to improve the quality of life of those affected. In the first month after the hurricane, the Fund collected over 42,000 online donations alone; approximately $128.4 million has been received to date from all 50 states and $30.9 million from foreign countries.

Both the foundation and the Clintons personally have been involved in Haiti before and after the 2010 Haiti earthquake. Bill Clinton was named the head of the Interim Haiti Recovery Commission (IHRC) in 2010 after serving as UN special envoy to Haiti in the immediate aftermath of the disaster. The Clinton Foundation itself raised $30m and played an important part in the creation of the Caracol Industrial Park. The IHRC mandate was removed by the Haitian legislature in 2011.

=== No Ceilings project ===
In 2013, Hillary Clinton established a partnership between the foundation and the Gates Foundation to gather and study data on the progress of women and girls around the world since the United Nations Fourth World Conference On Women in Beijing in 1995. This is called "No Ceilings: The Full Participation Project". The project released a report in March 2015.

=== Clinton Global Initiative Ukraine Action Network ===
In September 2023, the launch of the Clinton Foundation's initiative for supporting Ukraine — Clinton Global Initiative Ukraine Action Network — was announced to support non-profit organizations working in Ukraine.

== Financials ==
The Clinton Foundation relies on donation from various groups or individuals, donors such as Bill & Melinda Gates Foundation donated over $25 million over the years. Throughout the years, donations have been varying from one year to the other according to their financial reports.

Revenues in millions $
Year	Revenues
2004	58.7
2005	71.1
2006	112.7
2007	131.4
2008	234.8
2009	246.2
2010	313.6
2011	253.2
2012	134.2
2013	294.7
2014	338.0
2015	298.8
2016	224.8
2017	56.8
2018	20.2
2019	

Revenues in millions $

== Charity review sources ==
In March 2015, the charity watchdog group Charity Navigator added the Clinton Foundation to a watch list (a designation meant to warn donors that questions have been raised about an entity's practices), after several news organizations raised questions over donations from corporations and foreign governments. It removed the foundation from its watch list in late December of that year. In September 2016, it gave it its highest possible rating, four out of four stars, after its customary review of the foundation's financial records and tax statements. A different charity monitor, CharityWatch, said that 88% of the foundation's money goes toward its charitable mission and gave the foundation an A rating for 2016. In 2015, based on revenue of $223 million and an expense ratio of 12% the foundation spent in excess of $26 million to complete its mission.

== Private philanthropy ==
The Clinton Foundation is a public organization to which anyone may donate. Due to their similar names, the public foundation has sometimes been confused with the Clinton Family Foundation, which is reserved for the Clintons' private philanthropy. The two foundations have sometimes been conflated by news sources. The significantly smaller Clinton Family Foundation is a traditional private foundation that serves as the vehicle for their personal charitable giving. Headquartered in Chappaqua, New York, it received nearly all of the approximately $14 million the Clintons gave to charity from 2007 to 2013.

== Controversies ==
=== Transparency ===
Around 2007, the Clinton Foundation was criticized for a lack of transparency. Although U.S. law did not require charities, including presidential foundations, to disclose the identities of their contributors, critics said that the names of donors should be disclosed because Hillary Clinton was running to be the Democratic nominee for President of the United States. Commentator Matthew Yglesias opined in a Los Angeles Times op-ed that the Clintons should make public the names of foundation donors to avoid any appearance of impropriety.

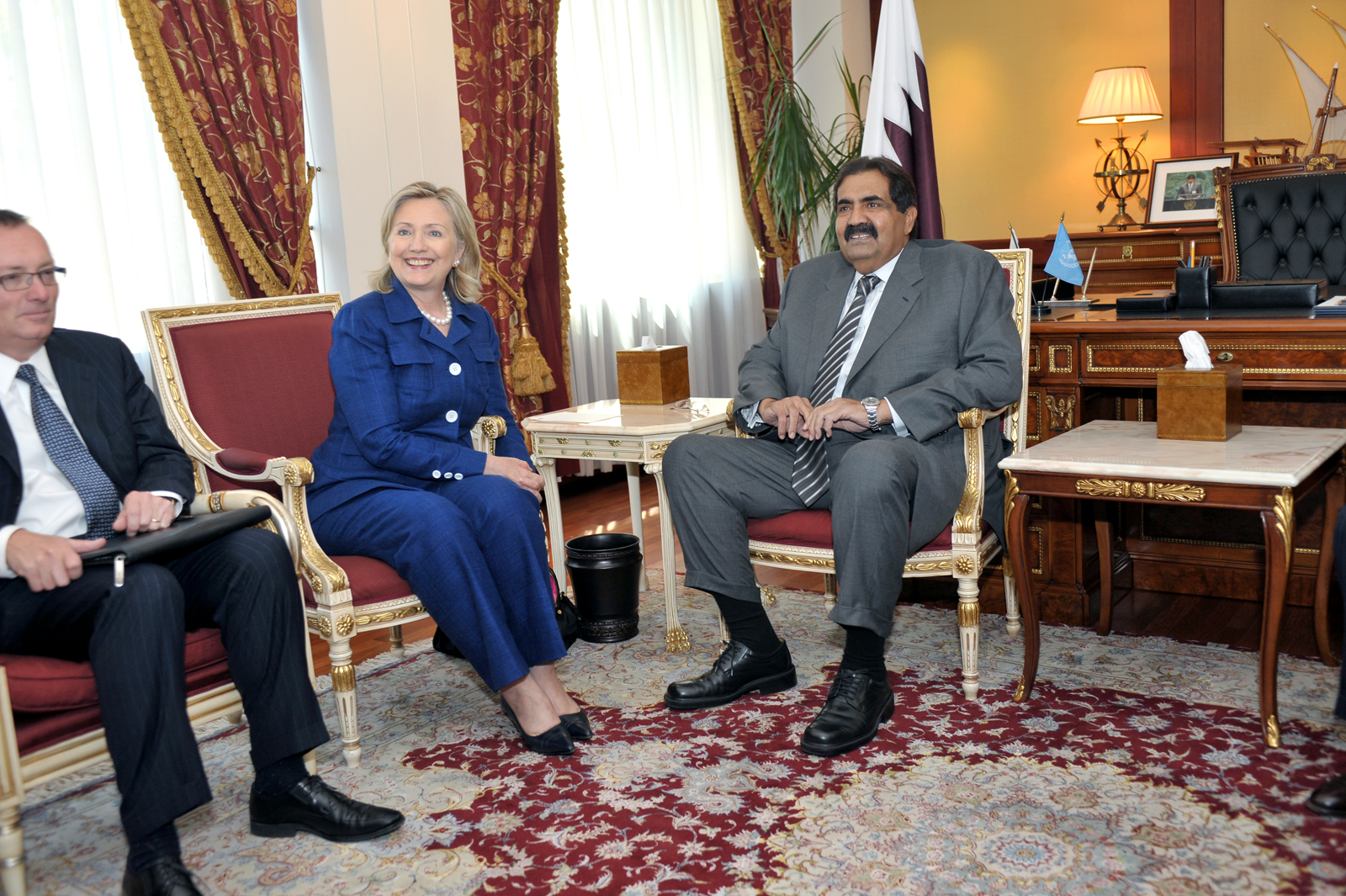
Secretary of State Clinton meets with Qatari Emir Hamad bin Khalifa Al Thani, September 21, 2010.

A lengthy donors list was then released by the foundation in December 2008, which included several politically sensitive donors, such as the Kingdom of Saudi Arabia and Blackwater Worldwide. The foundation stated that the disclosures would ensure that "not even the appearance of a conflict of interest" would exist once Hillary Clinton was Secretary of State.

The foundation has been criticized for receiving donations from Middle-Eastern countries which are seen to oppress women (stoning for adultery, not being able to drive, requiring a male guardian, etc.). This particularly included Saudi Arabia, which donated between $10 million and $25 million. Apart from the Middle Eastern countries like the United Arab Emirates and Oman, other foreign government donations came from Australia, Germany, and a Canadian government agency. The foundation accepted these donations even though Hillary Clinton's 2016 presidential campaign platform guaranteed to break down barriers that held women back.

In November 2016, Reuters reported that "The Clinton Foundation has confirmed it accepted a $1 million gift from Qatar while Hillary Clinton was U.S. Secretary of State without informing the State Department, even though she had promised to let the agency review new or significantly increased support from foreign governments." Washington Post columnist Jennifer Rubin opined that the Qatari gift "raised ethical questions" because of the nation's support for Hamas.

The ethics agreement between the State Department and the Clinton Foundation that had been put into force at the beginning of Hillary Clinton's tenure as Secretary of State in 2009 came under scrutiny from the news media during February 2015 as polls showed her the likely 2016 Democratic nominee for president. The Wall Street Journal reported that the Clinton Foundation had resumed accepting donations from foreign governments once Secretary Clinton's tenure had ended. Contributions from foreign donors, which are prohibited by law from contributing to political candidates in the U.S., constitute a major portion of the foundation's income. An investigation by The Washington Post of 2014 donations showed that there was "substantial overlap between the Clinton political machinery and the foundation". The investigation revealed that almost half of the major donors who had backed Ready for Hillary, a group which supported her 2016 presidency bid, had given at least $10,000 to the foundation, either personally or through foundations or companies they run. The Clinton Foundation's chief communications officer Craig Minassian explained that it is a "false choice to suggest that people who may be interested in supporting political causes wouldn't also support philanthropic work."

A subsequent Washington Post inquiry into donations by foreign governments to the Clinton Foundation during the Secretary's tenure found, in addition to six cases where such governments continued making donations at the same level they had before Clinton became Secretary as envisioned under the agreement, one instance of a new donation, $500,000 from Algeria for earthquake relief in Haiti, that was outside the bounds of the continuation provision and should have received a special ethics review, but did not. Foundation officials said that if the former Secretary decided to run for president in 2016, they would again consider what steps to take in reference to foreign donations. But in general, they stressed that, "As with other global charities, we rely on the support of individuals, organizations, corporations and governments who have the shared goal of addressing critical global challenges in a meaningful way. When anyone contributes to the Clinton Foundation, it goes towards foundation programs that help save lives." State Department spokesperson Jen Psaki attested that the foundation's commitment to the ethics agreement in question "has been over and above the letter of the law". In August 2016, after Clinton's securing the Democratic nomination, the Clinton Foundation announced that it will stop accepting foreign donations if she were elected.

In March 2015, Reuters reported that the Clinton Health Access Initiative had failed to publish all of its donors, and to let the State Department review all of its donations from foreign governments after it was spun off from the Clinton Foundation in 2010. In April 2015, The New York Times reported that when Hillary Clinton was Secretary of State, the State Department had approved transactions that allowed Russian state-owned corporation Rosatom to take a majority stake in Uranium One, whose chairman had donated to the Clinton Foundation. The State Department "was one of nine government agencies, not to mention independent federal and state nuclear regulators, that had to sign off on the deal." FactCheck.org stated there is "no evidence" that the donations influenced Clinton's official actions or that she was involved in the State Department's decision to approve the deal, and PolitiFact concluded that any "suggestion of a quid pro quo is unsubstantiated".

=== 2015 State Department subpoena ===
In February 2016, The Washington Post reported that the United States Department of State issued a subpoena to the foundation in the fall of 2015. According to the report, the subpoena focused on "documents about the charity's projects that may have required approval from federal government during Hillary Clinton's term as secretary of state" and "also asked for records related to Huma Abedin, longtime Clinton aide who for six months in 2012 was employed simultaneously by the State Department, the foundation, Clinton's personal office, and a private consulting firm with ties to the Clintons."

=== Australian government donations ===
Donations totalling tens of millions of dollars from successive Australian and New Zealand governments to the Clinton Foundation were the subject of criticism from a number of groups including the Taxpayers union of New Zealand for a perceived lack of accountability and perceived conflicts of interest, some of the donations were made directly and some through AUSAID.

In 2006, the then foreign minister Alexander Downer and former President Clinton jointly signed a Memorandum of Understanding in February 2006 that gave more than A$25 million to the Clinton Foundation across four years for a project to provide screening and drug treatment to AIDS patients in Asia. The donation was later made through an affiliate of the charity known as the Clinton Health Access Initiative (CHAI). The Australian government ceased funding CHAI in 2016. In 2017 the Specialist Health Service (SHS) in a report commissioned by DFAT noted "Previously, there appears to have been an over-reliance on the Clinton Health Access Initiative (CHAI) for facilitating market access".

In 2011, a pledge of A$270 million was made by Australian Julia Gillard government to the Global Partnership for Education which in 2014 joined the Clinton Global Initiative. Julia Gillard was made a member of the board of Global Partnership for Education in 2014 after losing the Australian federal election.

According to DFAT, Australia contributed A$340.8 million to the Global partnership for education between 2007 and 2014 including A$90 million in replenishment between 2018 and 2020.

=== Ethics controversies and use of taxpayer funds ===
According to the hacked Podesta emails, Doug Band, an employee of the Clinton Foundation, accused Chelsea Clinton's husband Marc Mezvinsky of being involved in conflicts of interest. According to Band, Mezvinsky used the foundation to raise money for his hedge fund. Band also said that he could name 500 different conflicts of interest involving the foundation and some that involved Bill Clinton.

Using the Former Presidents Act Bill Clinton used taxpayer funds to supplement the pay of aides at the Clinton foundation and also used funds for IT equipment. Clinton withdrew 16 million dollars using the president act which was more than any other living president had withdrawn.

=== Cash for access ===
In 2011, Raj Fernando, who gave between $100,000 and $250,000 to the Clinton Foundation, was appointed to the International Security Advisory Board within the State Department despite being unqualified. Fernando's appointment came at the request of Clinton aide Cheryl Mills and Hillary Clinton. Fernando resigned from the position shortly after an inquiry was made by ABC.

In 2009, foundation aide Doug Band emailed Huma Abedin requesting a meeting with Hillary Clinton for Salman bin Hamad Al Khalifa, who had donated $32 million to the Clinton Foundation. Two days later, the meeting was arranged.
