= Borzu Nama =

Medieval Persian epic poem

The Borzu Nama (pronounced as Borzū-Nāma or Borzū-Nāme) (Persian: برزونامه) is a Persian epic poem of about 65,000 couplets recounting the exploits and adventures of the legendary hero Borzu, son of Sohrab and grandson of Rostam.

== Plot ==
Abraham Hyacinthe Anquetil-Duperron identifies the author as 'Ata'i, who is further identified as 'Amid Abu'l 'Ala' 'Ata b. Yaqub Kateb Razi by Blochet. He was a poet of the Ghaznavid court and died around 1078-1079. The language of the Borzu-nama is characteristics of texts of the 11th century. The story is versified in the same meter and style of Ferdowsi's Shahnama. The Borzu-nama is possibly the longest of the post Shahnama epic poems and includes material from Iranian national legends not used by Ferdowsi.

The story starts with Sohrab the son of Rostam. On his way from Turan to fight the Iranians he marries a woman named Shahru. Before leaving, he gives her a token to give to their unborn child. The child is named Borzu by Shahru and she raises him without disclosing his father's identity. The young Borzu is recruited into Afrasiab's, the King of Turan, army. Borzu eventually forces his mother to reveal his father's name. On finding that it was Sohrab, he sets off to battle Rostam to avenge his father's death. Afrasiab then sends him with an army to Iran, but Borzu is captured by Rostam's son Faramarz and taken to Sistan. Shahru is informed of Borzu's capture, and helps him escape. He is recaptured by Rostam, and not recognizing his grandfather, Borzu battles Rostam. His life is spared at the last minute when Shahru reveals their relationship. Borzu and Rostam embrace and Borzu joins the Iranian forces. Afrasiab learns of this and sends Susan-e Rameshgar, a musician and sorceress to capture Rostam and Borzu. Afrasiab arrives with his army and the epic takes up a long series of battles and adventures that include famous Iranian and Turanian heroes from the Shahnameh, along with Divs, Paris (fairies) and wizards. The tale concludes with the death of Borzu at the hands of a Div.

== Editions ==
The Borzu-nama has not yet been published in a critical edition, but versions of the text have been included in the Shah Nama editions of both Turner Macan (pp. 2160–296) and Dabirsiāqi.

== Possible influences ==
Friedrich von Suhtschek, in a discussion of the Iranian sources of the Grail legend, claimed, but did not prove, that the Borzu Nama is the direct source of Wolfram von Eschenbach’s Parzifal.

== See also ==
- Ferdowsi
- List of Persian poets and authors
- Persian literature
