= Zurabishvili =

Zurabishvili, also French transliteration Zourabichvili, is a Georgian surname (Georgian: ზურაბიშვილი). Notable people with the surname include:

- David Zurabishvili (born 1957), Georgian politician
- François Zourabichvili (1965–2006), French philosopher
- Hélène Zourabichvili (1929–2023), French political historian
- Nicolas Zourabichvili (born 1936), French composer
- Salome Zourabichvili (born 1952), Georgian politician and diplomat

== See also ==
- Zurab
