= Raj Fernando =

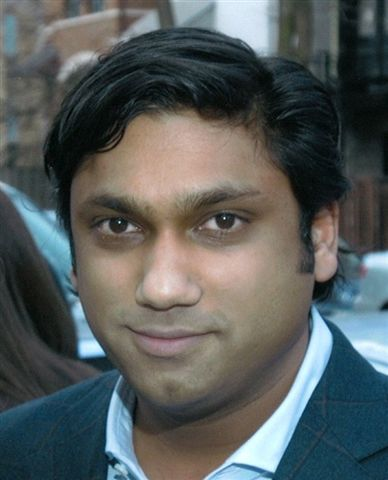
- Born: Rajiv Kumar Fernando; July 8, 1971 (age 55)
- Education: Beloit College

Rajiv K. "Raj" Fernando (born July 8, 1971) is an American businessman, political fundraiser and donor, and philanthropist. He is the current chairman and CEO of Workstorm.com and the former CEO of Chopper Trading.

== Early life and education ==
Fernando was born to CK and Laura Fernando while the two were living in Denmark, after CK completed a Fulbright Scholarship at New York University and Laura completed her studies in classical piano under a Juilliard School professor. He was born the youngest of three children after his two sisters, Netasha and Tanya, and moved to the United States before the age of one.

Fernando attended Beloit College, where he earned bachelor's degrees in economics and history. He also studied at the University College London.

In 2018, Fernando received the Distinguished Service Citation from Beloit College. The award recognizes alumni on the basis of overall achievements, personal growth in career, and outstanding civic, cultural, and professional/business service.

== Career ==
While in college, Fernando volunteered at the Chicago Mercantile Exchange. From 1991 to 2001, Fernando worked in various roles including trading positions at the Chicago Mercantile Exchange and the Chicago Board of Trade.

In 2002, Fernando founded Chopper Trading, a Chicago-based proprietary trading firm that concentrated in the areas of fixed income, equities, and other products. Fernando became CEO of the company. During Chopper's development, Fernando designed, implemented, and managed sophisticated risk management, communications, trading, monitoring, and source code security systems. Since the company's founding, Fernando's work helped make the company a major participant on the world's largest global exchanges including the CME, Nasdaq, LSE, ICE, and Eurex with approximately 250 employees globally.

In 2010, Fernando was part of a staff roundtable discussion on disruptive trading practices for the U.S. Commodity Futures Trading Commission.

In January 2015, Fernando sold Chopper Trading to DRW Trading Group in "a deal that [would] fuse two of the best known companies in Chicago's proprietary trading community."

In 2015, Fernando founded Workstorm, a technology company based in Chicago. Workstorm’s digital collaboration platform is built to be highly secure and includes videoconferencing, secure messaging, email and calendar integration, file sharing and custom integration capabilities. In 2020, Business Insider called Workstorm a “more secure Slack competitor.” Fernando is currently CEO of Workstorm.

== Foreign policy ==
Fernando is a board member of the Chicago Council of Global Affairs. He previously served on the boards of the American Security Project and the Foreign Policy Leadership Committee at the Brookings Institution.

Fernando was appointed to the State Department's International Security Advisory Board (ISAB) during the tenure of Secretary of State Hillary Clinton. He submitted his resignation to Secretary Clinton on August 17, 2011, citing a self-proclaimed need to "focus my energy on the operations of my company" because of "unique, unexpected, and excessive volatility in the international markets." According to State Department emails later obtained by Citizens United and given to ABC News, Fernando submitted his resignation two days after an ABC News investigative team contacted the State Department asking about his qualifications to be a member of the ISAB and the procedure that led to Fernando's appointment. Wade Boese, then Chief of Staff for the Office of the Under Secretary of State for Arms Control and International Security, said in one of the released emails that "the true answer is simply that S [Secretary Clinton] staff (Cheryl Mills) added him. The board's membership preceded me. Raj was not on the list [of prospective members] sent to S; he was added at their insistence."

Defending Fernando's appointment, ISAB executive director Richard Hartman called him as an expert in "cyber security" and said Fernando had experience in the private sector implementing sophisticated risk management systems, information technology and international financial markets. Retired Brigadier General Stephen A. Cheney, an ISAB member and CEO of American Security Project, said Fernando's "expertise in cyber-security [is] a great asset to [U.S.] national security."

In 2011, Fernando worked with the National Democratic Institute to monitor the first presidential election in Egypt.

== Political contributions ==
Fernando has made political contributions to Democratic candidates since 2003. He fundraised for Hillary Clinton's 2008 presidential campaign, raising up to $100,000. Fernando donated US$9,400 to Hillary Clinton's 2016 presidential campaign. He also fundraised for Barack Obama's 2008 presidential campaign. He donated $30,000 to WomenCount, a political action committee whose aim is to elect Democratic women who run for office.

== Philanthropy ==
Fernando serves on the board of directors for PAWS Chicago, a no-kill animal shelter, and the board of trustees for Beloit College. He previously served on the board of trustees for the Chicago Symphony Orchestra. He has supported Wounded Warriors, and Big Brothers Big Sisters of Metropolitan Chicago. Fernando has also been a contributor to The Steppenwolf Theatre, Cedars-Sinai Medical Center in Los Angeles, and the Illinois Holocaust Museum, among other organizations. He has donated between $100,000 and $250,000 to the Clinton Foundation.
