= Zurab =

Name list

Zurab (Georgian: ზურაბ) is a Georgian masculine given name. It derives from the Persian Sohrab, a name of the legendary warrior from Ferdowsi's Shahnameh. It may refer to:

- Zurab Adeishvili (born 1972), Georgian jurist and politician, Minister of Justice of Georgia since 2008
- Zurab Arziani (born 1987), Georgian footballer
- Zurab Avalishvili (1876–1944), Georgian historian, jurist and diplomat
- Zurab Azmaiparashvili (born 1960), chess Grandmaster from Georgia
- Zurab Ionanidze (born 1971), footballer for FC Zestaponi, in Georgia's Umaglesi Liga
- Zurab Khizanishvili (born 1981), Georgian professional football player who plays for Reading
- Zurab Mamaladze (born 1982), Georgian association footballer who plays for Zestaponi
- Zurab Menteshashvili (born 1980), football midfielder from Georgia
- Zurab Nadareishvili (born 1957), Georgian composer
- Zurab Noghaideli (born 1964), Georgian businessman, politician, Prime Minister of Georgia 2005–2007
- Zurab Pochkhua (born 1963), Georgian colonel and Commander of Georgian Air Forces since 2008
- Zurab Pololikashvili (born 1977), Georgian politician, diplomat, Secretary-General of the World Tourism Organization
- Zurab Rtveliashvili, Georgian poet and multi-media performer
- Zurab Sakandelidze (1945–2004), Georgian basketball player
- Zurab Sanaya (born 1968), Russian professional football coach and a former player
- Zurab Semyonovich Tsereteli (1953–1992), Georgian professional footballer
- Zurab Tchiaberashvili (born 1972), Georgian political rights activist, politician, philosopher and journalist
- Zurab Tsereteli (1934–2025), controversial Georgian painter, sculptor and architect, President of the Russian Academy of Arts
- Zurab Tsiklauri (born 1974), Russian professional footballer
- Zurab Zhvania (1963–2005), Georgian politician, Prime Minister of Georgia and Speaker of the Parliament of Georgia
- Zurab Zviadauri (born 1981), Georgian judoka

== See also ==
- Zurabishvili
