= Suraya Pakzad =

Afghan women's rights activist

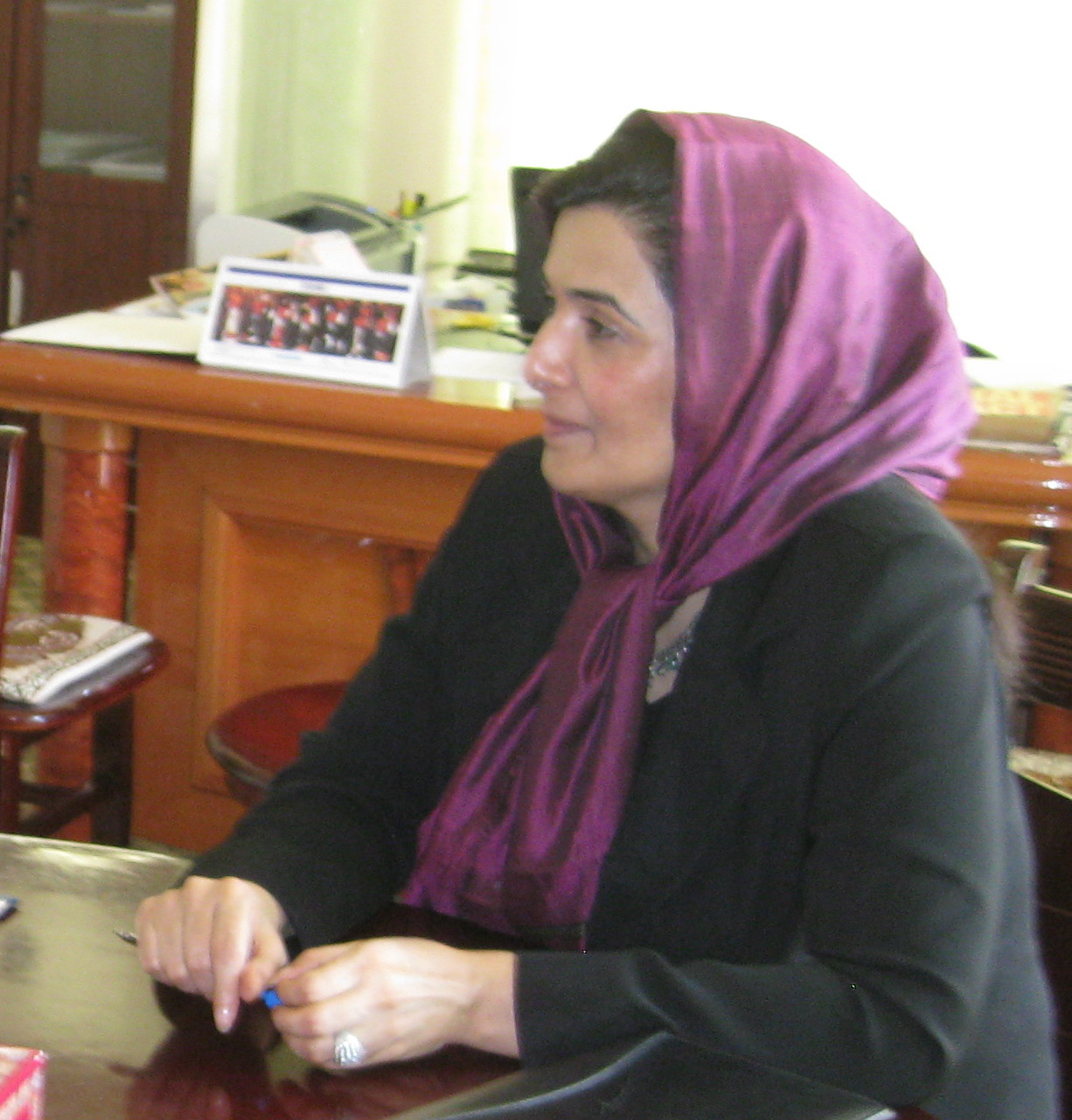
Suraya Pakzad

Suraya Pakzad (Dari: ثریا پاکزاد) is an Afghan women's rights activist. In 1998 she founded the organization Voice of Women, which began by teaching girls how to read, and now provides women with shelter, counseling, and job training. The organization worked in secret until 2001 because of the Taliban. In fact, on two occasions, the girls being taught to read had to burn their books for fear of being caught. Voice of Women was named as an official NGO in 2001, and in 2002 it officially registered with the government of Afghanistan. It also helped develop the Afghan constitution.

Pakzad received an International Women of Courage Award from the US Secretary of State, and a “Malali Medal” from the President of Afghanistan, both in 2008. She was named one of the Time 100 in 2009.

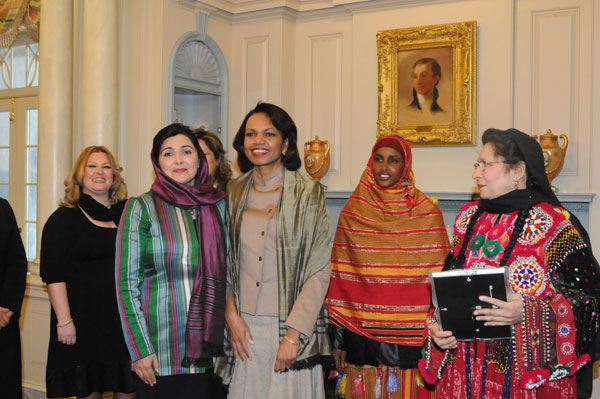
2008 Secretary of State's Awards for International Women of Courage. Suraya Pakzad stands (left) next to Condoleezza Rice.

In 2010 she received an honorary doctorate degree from the University of Pennsylvania and an honorary Associate of Arts degree from Burlington County College, as well as the Clinton Global Citizen Award. In 2011 Newsweek named her as one of 150 Women Who Shake the World. In 2012 she received the Female Leader of the Year Award from the Austria Female Leadership Foundation in Germany.
