= Qaleh Sohrab =

Qaleh Sohrab قلعه سهراب
- Village
- Location within Iran
- Coordinates: 27°30′37″N 53°15′38″E
- Country: Iran
- Province: Fars
- County: Lamerd
- Bakhsh: Alamarvdasht
- Rural District: Kheyrgu

Population (2006)
  - Total: 307
- Time zone: UTC+3:30 (IRST)
  - Summer (DST): UTC+4:30 (IRDT)

Qaleh Sohrab (Persian: قلعه سهراب, also Romanized as Qal‘eh Sohrāb; also known as Sohrāb) is a village in Kheyrgu Rural District, Alamarvdasht District, Lamerd County, Fars province, Iran. At the 2006 census, its population was 307, in 55 families.
