= Sohrab =

Persian mythological hero of the epic poem Shahnameh

Pahlavan Sohrab
- سهراب
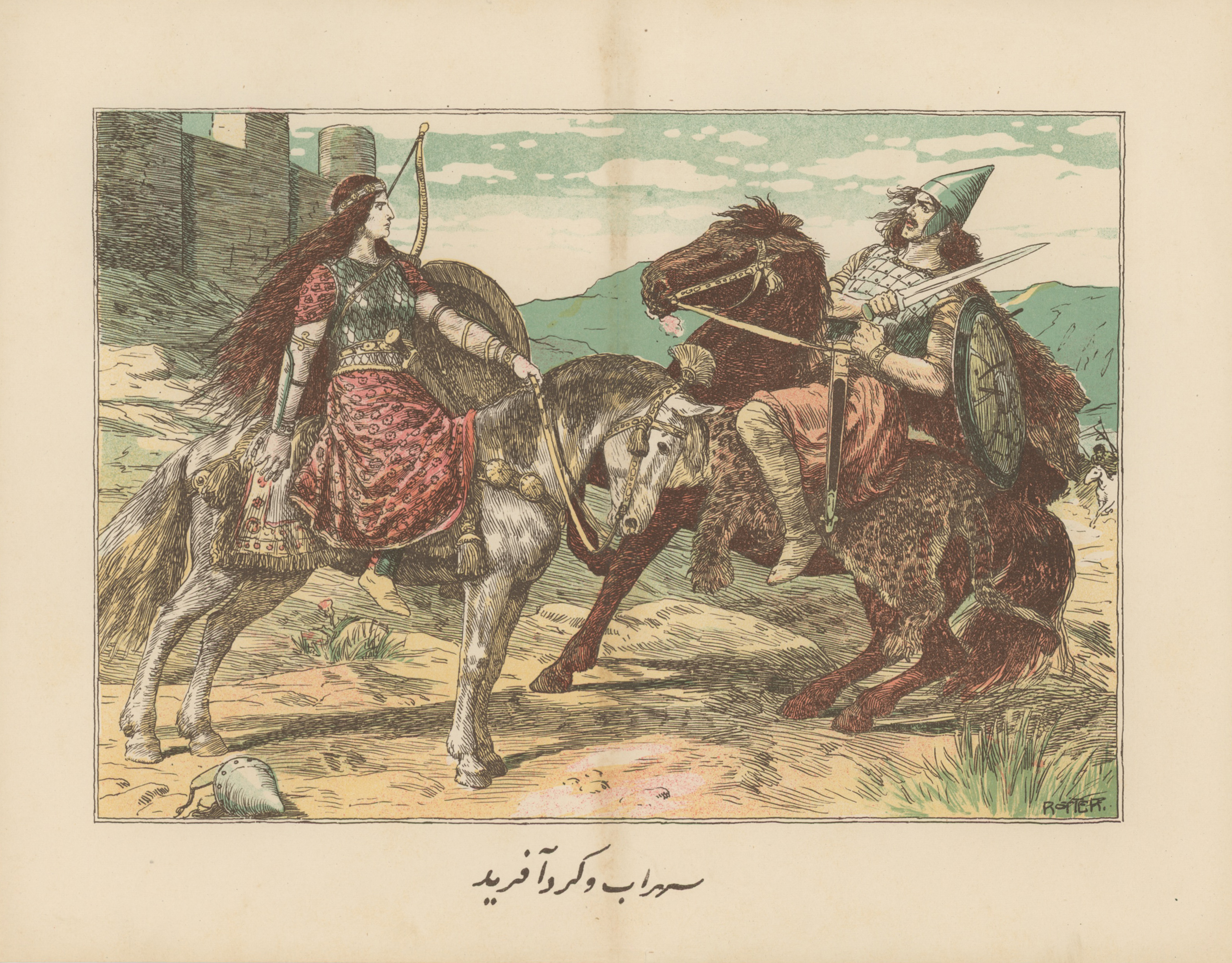
- Sohrab and Gordafarid
- Born: Kingdom of Samangan (present-day Aybak, Samangan, Afghanistan)
- Died: Turan
- Cause of death: Killed in combat by his father, Rostam, with neither Rostam nor Sohrab aware of their kinship.
- Known for: Battle with Rostam
- Children: Borzu (in Borzu Nama)
- Parents: Rostam (father); Tahmina (mother)
- Family: Zal (grandfather) Zavara (uncle)

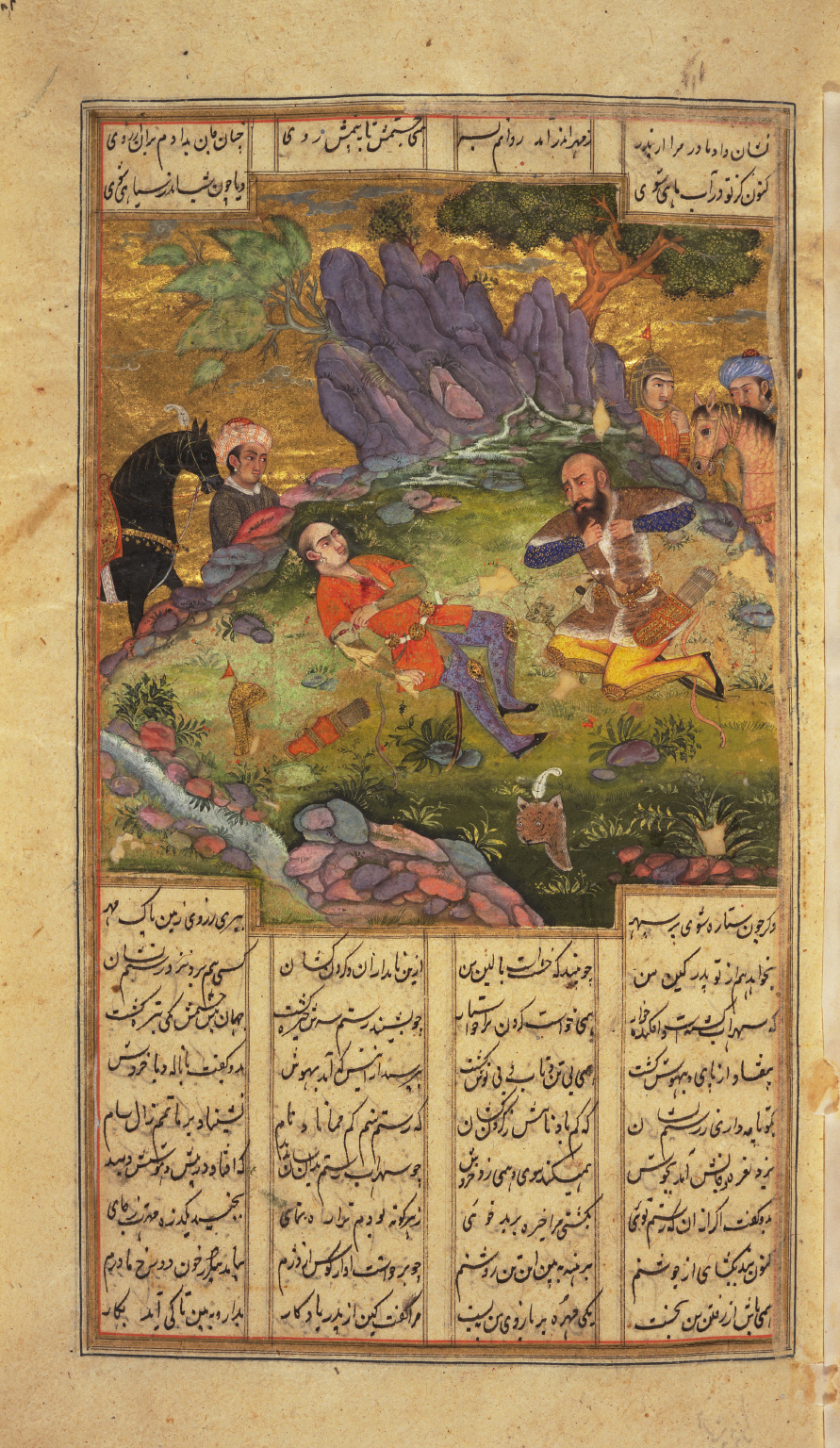
Persian manuscript painting: Rustam lamented for Suhrab

Sohrāb or Suhrāb (Persian: سهراب) is a legendary warrior from the Shahnameh, or the Tales of Kings by Ferdowsi in the tragedy of Rostam and Sohrab. He was the son of Rostam, who was an Iranian warrior, and Tahmineh, the daughter of the king of Samangan, a neighboring country. He was slain at a young age by his father Rostam. Rostam found out that he was his son only after fatally wounding him in a duel. Kaykavous, the king of Iran, delayed giving Rostam the panacea (Noush Daru) to save Sohrab as he feared losing his power to the alliance of the father and the son. Rostam gave Tahmineh a bracelet as a reminder and a sign to his son.

His name means “hot red water”, and is analogous with the modern Persian term, "Sorkh-ab". It can also mean "beautiful and illustrious/shining face". The name Sohrab is associated with tremendous bravery and courage.

== Family tree ==
Nariman
Sām	Mehrab Kaboli	Sindukht
Zāl	Rudaabeh
Rostam	Tahmineh
Sohrab

== In popular and traditional culture ==
The legend of Rostam and Sohrab is significant part of Persianate cultures.

Sohrab Cycles one of the biggest bicycle manufacturers in Pakistan is named after Sohrab.

Sohrab remains a popular name in Persian-influenced cultures from Turkey to India.

== See also ==
- Rostam and Sohrab
- Sohrab and Rustum – 1853 narrative poem by Matthew Arnold
- Zurab – Georgian masculine given name
