= Surab, Iranshahr =

Surab سوراب
- Village
- Location within Iran
- Coordinates: 27°10′24″N 60°41′08″E
- Country: Iran
- Province: Sistan and Baluchestan
- County: Iranshahr
- Bakhsh: Central
- Rural District: Howmeh

Population (2006)
  - Total: 338
- Time zone: UTC+3:30 (IRST)
  - Summer (DST): UTC+4:30 (IRDT)

Surab (Persian: سوراب, also Romanized as Sūrāb) is a village in Howmeh Rural District, in the Central District of Iranshahr County, Sistan and Baluchestan Province, Iran. At the 2006 census, its population was 338, in 72 families.
