= Gordafarid =

Persian mythological heroine of the epic poem Shahnameh

- Shahnameh character
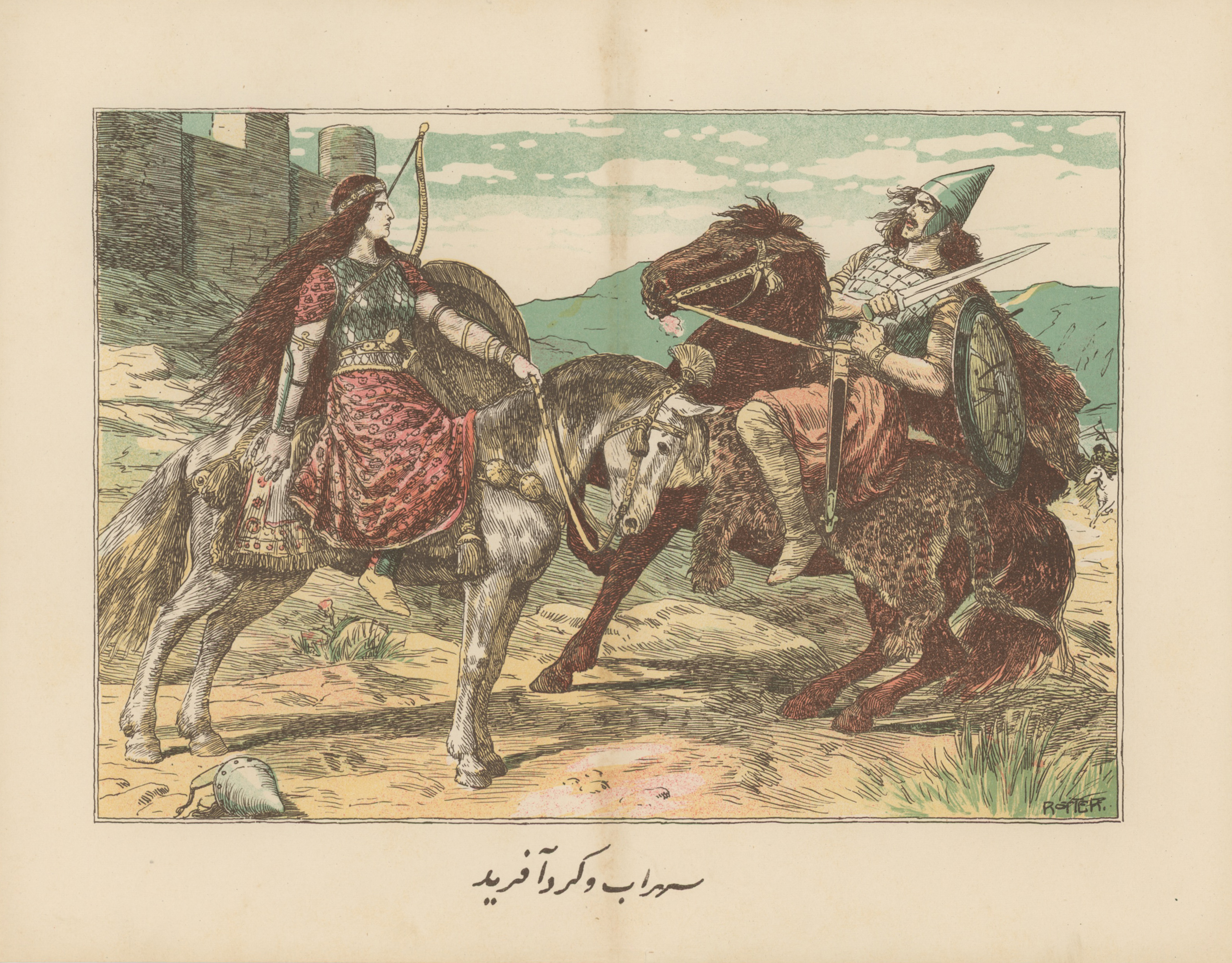
- Sohrab and Gordafarid

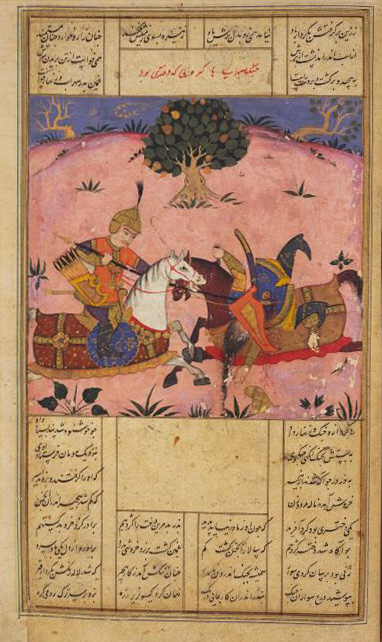
Sohrab fights Gordafarid

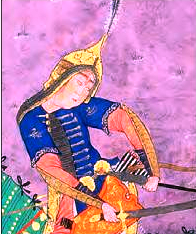
Gordafarid in the Shahnameh of Shah Tahmasp

Gordāfarīd (Persian: گردآفريد) is one of the heroines of the Shāhnāmeh "The Book of Kings" or "The Epic of Kings", an enormous poetic opus of Persian literature written by Ferdowsi around 1000 AD. She was a champion who fought against Sohrab (another Iranian hero who was the commander of the Turanian army) and delayed the Turanian troops who were marching on Persia. She is a symbol of courage and wisdom for Persian women.

But one of those within the fortress was a woman, daughter of the warrior Gazhdaham, named Gordafarid. When she learned that their leader had allowed himself to be taken, she found his behaviour so shameful that her rosy cheeks became as black as pitch with rage. With not a moment's delay she dressed herself in a knight's armour, gathered her hair beneath a Rumi helmet, and rode out from the fortress, a lion eager for battle. She roared at the enemy ranks, "Where are your heroes, your warriors, your tried and tested chieftains?"

— Ferdowsi, Shāhnāmeh

== Role and significance in the Shahnameh ==
In Ferdowsi’s Shahnameh, Gordāfarīd (Persian: گردآفرید) is portrayed as a brave and intelligent warrior woman from the White Fortress (Dezh-e Sepid). When the Turanian army led by Sohrab attacks the fortress, she dons armor and rides out to face him in single combat. Although eventually defeated, Sohrab admires her courage and spares her life. Her defiance delays the Turanian advance and allows the Iranian forces time to prepare for defense.

Modern scholarship often highlights Gordāfarīd as an early and distinctive instance of female heroism in Persian epic, whose intervention at the White Fortress both delays the Turanian advance and challenges the poem’s predominantly male heroic code. Her portrayal has been compared to “Amazon-like” figures in other world epics, such as Penthesilea and Joan of Arc, as Ferdowsi presents courage, prudence, and tactical intelligence as virtues not limited to male warriors.

English translations and critical studies note that Ferdowsi’s vivid characterization and narrative pacing make Gordāfarīd one of the most memorable female figures in Persian literature. In modern Iranian culture, she has been celebrated as a symbol of women’s courage, wisdom, and national pride, appearing in theatre, painting, and literary reinterpretations of the Shahnameh.
