= Rostam and Sohrab (opera) =

Rostam and Sohrab is an opera by Loris Tjeknavorian. It is based on the story Rostam and Sohrab in the epic Shahnameh. Its composition took 25 years. In 1963, Carl Orff granted Loris Tjeknavorian a scholarship which allowed him to reside in Salzburg and to complete his opera in Austria.

This work is regarded as the first opera composed within Iran that systematically incorporates the melodic and rhythmic characteristics of Iranian folk, religious, and professional music traditions. Rather than directly borrowing existing material, the composer developed the work within the framework of “ethnomusical thinking.”

== Creation and Performance History ==
1963: Received funding from Carl Orff at the Mozarteum and completed the first draft of the opera in Salzburg.

2000: According to the Armenian News Agency, during the Armenian National Philharmonic's visit to Iran, Tjeknavorian performed “Rostam and Sohrab” at Tehran's Vahdat Hall, conducting the work himself.

2001: Hermes Records: Armenian Philharmonic Orchestra & Choir / L. Tjeknavorian, Rostam & Sohrab (2CD, selections; 1:37:00)

2002: The European premier of opera "Rostam & Sohrab" (Concert vertion) at the St. Pöltner festspielhaus. With NTO Symphony Orchestra, Bratislava Philharmonic Choir and well known Austrian soloists conducted by the composer.

2005–2006: Behrouz Gharibpour adapted it into a puppet opera:Premiered at Tehran's Ferdowsi Hall in 2005, featuring 100 puppets and 15 puppeteers; Iran's first puppet opera on this subject.

2025: The Yerevan State Opera and Ballet Theatre premiered a new two-act production, receiving coverage from official sources and media outlets.

== Adaptation:Puppet Opera Version ==
The puppet opera Rustam and Sohrab, directed by Behrouz Garibpour and produced by the Alen Puppet Theater, premiered at Tehran's Ferdowsi Hall in 2005. To support the production, the hall underwent specialized stage renovations between 2003 and 2005, adding multi-level fly galleries, stage machinery with a seven-meter span, and lifting systems to accommodate large-scale marionette performances. The production employed approximately 100 puppets, each standing 80 centimeters tall and operated by 15 puppeteers. Each puppet comprised around 200 components, forming an intricate and complex manipulation system requiring collaboration among a professionally trained, tiered team. The musical component relies on a soundtrack composed and conducted by Loris Cheknavarian, meticulously synchronized via chronology with puppet movements, lighting, and scene changes. This “pre-recorded synchronization” mechanism, combined with the multidimensional staging of ensemble sequences, amplifies the epic tragedy's expressive power. Simultaneously, it imbues the puppet theater with new symbolic significance within contemporary expressions of religious and epic narrative traditions. This production not only signifies the experimental fusion of Iranian puppetry with modern opera but also achieved institutionalized production and sustained performances through its residency at Ferdowsi Hall and the establishment of the Puppet Opera Museum.

== See also ==
- Music of Iran
- Persian theatre
