= Tahmina =

Princess of Samangan

Shahdokht Tahmina Princess of the Kingdom of Samangan
- تهمینه
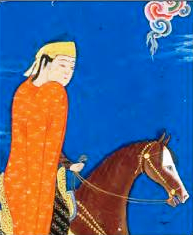
- Tahmina visits Rostam
- Born: Kingdom of Samangan (present-day Aybak, Samangan, Afghanistan)
- Died: Kingdom of Samangan
- Known for: Rostam and Sohrab
- Spouse: Rostam
- Children: Sohrab

Tahmina or Tahmineh (Persian: تَهمينه Tahmīna Persian pronunciation: [tæhˈmiːne], Tajik: Таҳмина Tahmīna, various other transcriptions like Tahmeena, Tehmina, Tahmineh, Tahmina) is a female character in the story Rostam and Sohrab, part of the 10th-century Persian epic of Shahnameh. Her name is mentioned as the wife of Rostam and as the daughter of Samanganshah, the sovereign of Samangan.

== References in the Shahnameh ==
In the Shahnameh, Rostam and Sohrab's story begins when Rostam loses his horse, Rakhsh. Grieved and angry, Rostam reaches Samangan, where he is greeted by the king, who offers him the assurance that Rakhsh was too well known for his hiding place not to be soon discovered.

The king of Samangan invites Rostam to stay for the night, therefore, he provides a lodging for the hero in his own palace.

That night, Tahmina comes to Rostam's bedchambers and declares her love for him. As described in the Shahnameh (Dick Davis translation), she told Rostram:

Like a legend I have heard the story
Of your heroic battles and your glory,
Of how you have no fear, and face alone
Dragons and demons and the dark unknown,
Of how you sneak into Turan at night
And prowl the borders to provoke a fight,
I bit my lip to hear such talk, and knew
I longed for you.
(Shahnameh, Sohrab 8:2)

Rostam commands that a virtuous Mubad should come and crave her for him from her father. After their marriage, Rostam sleeps with Tahminah and later gives her a jewel from the band around his arm, saying:

If a daughter is granted to you by fate, take and bind it on her tresses to secure good fortune and as a talisman to brighten the world.
But if the stars send a son, bind it upon his arm in token of his father.
He will attain the stature of Sam son of Nariman, and he will have the valour and spirit of noble men.
He will bring down the eagle in swift flight out of the clouds, and the sun will not shine on him with overpowering heat. '

Upon finding his horse, Rostam leaves the city of Samangan and returns to Iran. After nine months, Tahmina bears Rostam a son, Sohrab.

In the final Iran-Turan battle, when Rostam kills Sohrab, he discovers the jewel, realizing that Sohrab is his son. Tahmina's name appears once again in the Shahnama when she receives the tidings of her son's death. She is recorded to have cried:

To whom shall I clasp upon my bosom now?
Who is there that will rid me of my grief?
Whom shall I call upon to take thy place?
To whom impart my pain and misery?
Woe for his soul and body, eye and lustre, That dwell in dust instead of hall and garden!
(Shahnameh/ Sohrab 18:29:11)

== Sources and references ==
- Abolqasem Ferdowsi, Dick Davis trans. (2006), Shahnameh: The Persian Book of Kings ISBN 0-670-03485-1, modern English translation (abridged), current standard
- Warner, Arthur and Edmond Warner, (translators) The Shahnama of Firdausi, 9 vols. (London: Keegan Paul, 1905–1925) (complete English verse translation)
- Shirzad Aghaee, Nam-e kasan va ja'i-ha dar Shahnama-ye Ferdousi(Personalities and Places in the Shahnama of Ferdousi, Nyköping, Sweden, 1993. (ISBN 91-630-1959-0)
- Jalal Khāleghi Motlagh, Editor, The Shahnameh, to be published in 8 volumes (ca. 500 pages each), consisting of six volumes of text and two volumes of explanatory notes. See: Center for Iranian Studies, Columbia University.
