= Sohrab Pakzad =

Sohrab Pakzad سهراب پاکزاد
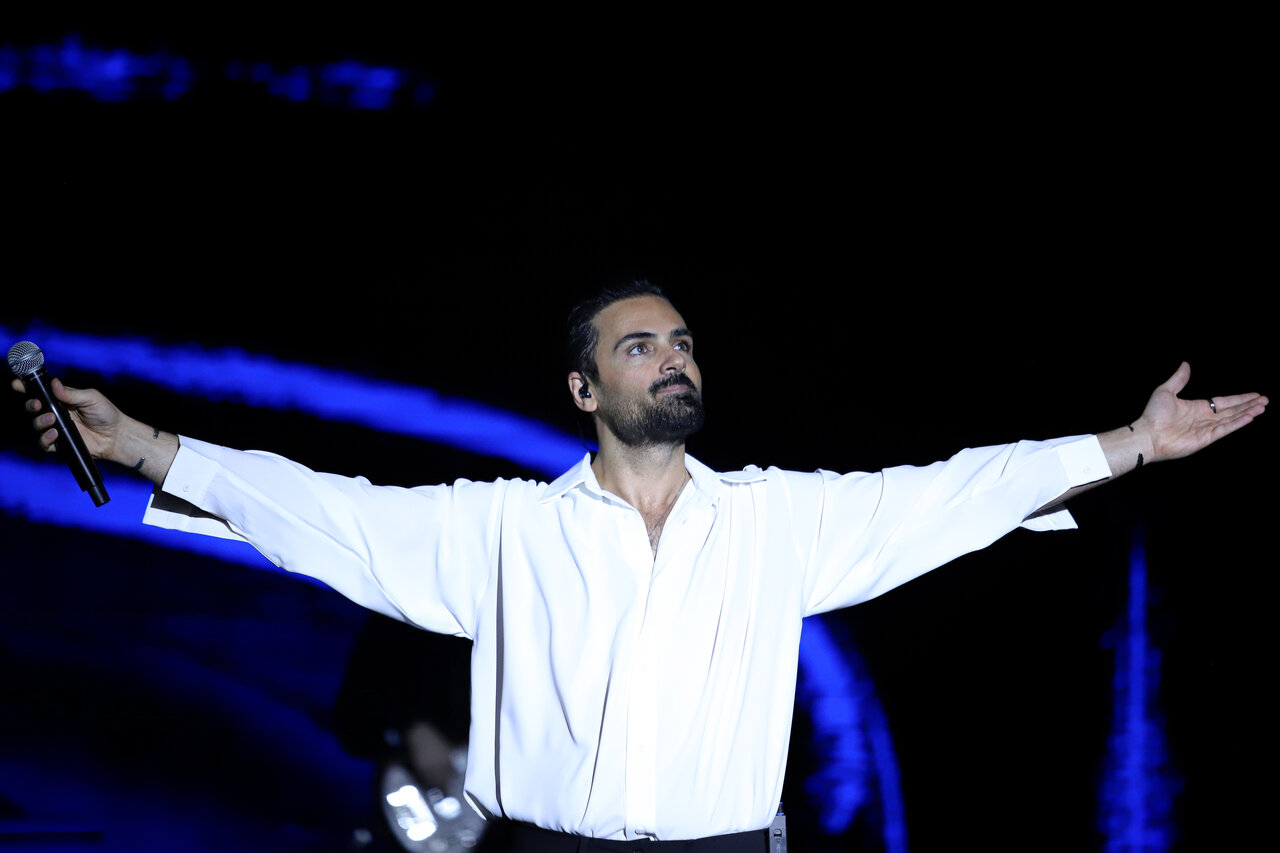
- Concert of music by Sohrab Pakzad for people with special needs at the Milad Tower conference hall, March 1, 2024

Background information
- Born: July 3, 1981 (age 45)
- Origin: Tehran, Iran
- Genres: Persian pop; House
- Occupations: Singer; Songwriter; Composer; Model
- Instrument: guitar
- Years active: 2000–present

Sohrab Pakzad Persian: سهراب پاکزاد (born July 3, 1981 in Tehran) is an Iranian singer, composer, and model. He began his professional career in the mid-2000s and rose to fame with the release of the album "Under The Rain" (2009), which was considered the first authorized house album in Iran. The song "In Che Hesieh" is one of his most famous works.

== Biography and education ==
Sohrab Pakzad was born on July 3, 1981 in Tehran. He holds a master's degree in business administration from the Iran University of Science and Technology. Pakzad began his musical career experimentally by playing the guitar, and then took solfege courses under the supervision of teachers such as Hooman Javid. Before and even simultaneously entering the music world professionally, he also worked in modeling and advertising.

== Career ==
=== The beginning of the career and the album "Under the Rain" ===
Sohrab Pakzad's serious career began with his collaboration with Amir Tabari. The result of this collaboration was the release of the song "Zire Baroon" which was widely acclaimed. In 2009, he managed to obtain a license for the album "Zire Baroon". This album was disruptive due to its use of modern arrangements and the House style, which had been rarely heard in the Iranian licensed market until then, and achieved high sales. The song "In Che Hesieh" from this album became one of the mega hits of pop music of those years.

=== The era of silence and return ===
After the success of his first album, Pakzad was less active for a while, focusing more on singles. He returned to the music scene in the late 2024 by changing his work team and collaborating with newer artists such as Asef Aria and Ali Yasini. The release of songs such as "Shokhi Mage" and "Emza" brought him back to the top of the pop charts.

=== Concerts ===
Sohrab Pakzad held his first independent concert in late 2009 at the Arike Iranian Hall, with Mohammad Reza Golzar playing drums. After returning to his peak, he resumed his concert tour in Tehran and other cities in Iran.Sohrab Pakzad also held a concert for people with special needs and Down syndrome in Iran, which received attention.

== Margins ==
In early 2025, a video circulated online showing women dancing without a hijab at Sohrab Pakzad's concert. After the video was published, Sohrab Pakzad was detained for a while.

== Discography ==
=== Albums ===
- Under the Rain (2009) - (with the collaboration of Amir Tabari and arrangements by Nima Varasteh)

Under the Rain, Ahang Parsian
Year	Album name	Singer	Row	Title	Writer(s)	Producer(s)	Arrangement	Notes
2009	Under the Rain (Zire Baroon)	Sohrab Pakzad & Amir Tabari	1	"Zire Baroon"	Sohrab Pakzad	Sohrab Pakzad & Amir Tabari	Nima Varasteh	Mixing, Mastering, and Piano-Keyboard: Nima Varasteh; Recording supervisor and sound engineer: Ali Hosseinzadeh; Darbuka: Homayoun Nasiri; Recording Studio: Avalin Khaneye Honar Studio (Nima Varasteh)
2009	Under the Rain (Zire Baroon)	Sohrab Pakzad & Amir Tabari	2	"Aroom Aroom"	Sohrab Pakzad	Sohrab Pakzad & Amir Tabari	Nima Varasteh	Mixing, Mastering, and Piano-Keyboard: Nima Varasteh; Recording supervisor and sound engineer: Ali Hosseinzadeh; Darbuka: Homayoun Nasiri; Recording Studio: Avalin Khaneye Honar Studio (Nima Varasteh)
2009	Under the Rain (Zire Baroon)	Sohrab Pakzad & Amir Tabari	3	"In Che Hesieh"	Sohrab Pakzad	Sohrab Pakzad & Amir Tabari	Nima Varasteh	Mixing, Mastering, and Piano-Keyboard: Nima Varasteh; Recording supervisor and sound engineer: Ali Hosseinzadeh; Darbuka: Homayoun Nasiri; Recording Studio: Avalin Khaneye Honar Studio (Nima Varasteh)
2009	Under the Rain (Zire Baroon)	Sohrab Pakzad & Amir Tabari	4	"Bazi"	Aria Zakikhani	Sohrab Pakzad & Amir Tabari	Nima Varasteh	Mixing, Mastering, and Piano-Keyboard: Nima Varasteh; Recording supervisor and sound engineer: Ali Hosseinzadeh; Darbuka: Homayoun Nasiri; Recording Studio: Avalin Khaneye Honar Studio (Nima Varasteh)
2009	Under the Rain (Zire Baroon)	Sohrab Pakzad & Amir Tabari	5	"Roo Be Rooye Ayeneh"	Ali Mehregan	Sohrab Pakzad & Amir Tabari	Nima Varasteh	Mixing, Mastering, and Piano-Keyboard: Nima Varasteh; Recording supervisor and sound engineer: Ali Hosseinzadeh; Darbuka: Homayoun Nasiri; Recording Studio: Avalin Khaneye Honar Studio (Nima Varasteh)
2009	Under the Rain (Zire Baroon)	Sohrab Pakzad & Amir Tabari	6	"Nazanin"	Marjan Nouri Nejad	Sohrab Pakzad & Amir Tabari	Nima Varasteh	Mixing, Mastering, and Piano-Keyboard: Nima Varasteh; Recording supervisor and sound engineer: Ali Hosseinzadeh; Darbuka: Homayoun Nasiri; Recording Studio: Avalin Khaneye Honar Studio (Nima Varasteh)
2009	Under the Rain (Zire Baroon)	Sohrab Pakzad & Amir Tabari	7	"Mehraboon"	Aria Zakikhani	Sohrab Pakzad & Amir Tabari	Nima Varasteh	Mixing, Mastering, and Piano-Keyboard: Nima Varasteh; Recording supervisor and sound engineer: Ali Hosseinzadeh; Darbuka: Homayoun Nasiri; Recording Studio: Avalin Khaneye Honar Studio (Nima Varasteh)
2009	Under the Rain (Zire Baroon)	Sohrab Pakzad & Amir Tabari	8	"Azize Delam"	Aria Zakikhani	Sohrab Pakzad & Amir Tabari	Nima Varasteh	Mixing, Mastering, and Piano-Keyboard: Nima Varasteh; Recording supervisor and sound engineer: Ali Hosseinzadeh; Darbuka: Homayoun Nasiri; Recording Studio: Avalin Khaneye Honar Studio (Nima Varasteh)
