= Artaxias =

Artaxias (also called Artaxes or Artashes) may refer to:

== Kings and monarchs of Armenia ==
- Artaxiad dynasty (190 BC–12 AD) eponymously named after its founder Artaxias or Artashes
  - Artaxias I, reigned 190–159 BC, founder of the Artaxiad dynasty
  - Artaxias II, reigned 34–20 BC
- Artaxias III, reigned 18–35; no relation to the Artaxiad dynasty
- Artaxias IV, reigned 422–428, last king of the Arsacid dynasty; no relation to the Artaxiads

== Kings of Iberia ==
- Artaxias I of Iberia (died 78 BC)
- Arshak II of Iberia (died 1), also known as Artaxias II of Iberia

== Modern people ==
- Artashes Avoyan (born 1972), Armenian lawyer
- Artashes Arakelian (1909–1993), economist and member of the Armenian Academy of Sciences
- Artashes Babalian (1886–1959), Armenian doctor and politician
- Artashes Baghdasaryan (born 1984), Armenian football defender
- Artashes Geghamyan (born 1949), Armenian politician
- Ardashes Harutunian (1873–1915), Armenian poet and translator
- Artashes Kalaydzhan (born 1971), Russian Armenian footballer
- Arthur Meschian, (born 1949), Armenian rock musician, artist, and architect
- Artashes Minasian (born 1967), Armenian chess Grandmaster
- Artashes Shahinyan, founder of the PhysMath School after A. Shaninyan (Yerevan)

== Places ==
- Artashat (ancient city), also known as Artaxata, a city in Armenia
- Hartashen, Syunik, also known as Artashe, a rural community in Armenia

== See also ==
- Ardeshir (disambiguation)
- Artaxerxes (disambiguation)
- Asha
