= Katayun (name) =

Katayun (also Katayoun and Katajun) is a given name.

== People ==
- Katajun Amirpur (born 1971), German-Iranian professor
- Katayoun Copeland, American lawyer and politician
- Katayoun Khosrowyar (born 1987), Iranian-American football coach
- Katayun Mazdapour (born 1943), Iranian linguist
- Katayun Pracher-Hilander (born 1971), Austrian politician
- Katayoun Riahi (born 1961), Iranian actress
- Katayoon Shahabi (born 1968), Iranian film producer
- Katayun Virkar (1918–2011), Indian medical researcher

== Other uses ==
- Katāyoun, in Persian mythology, the wife of Goshtāsb and the mother of Esfandiār
