= Ard Yasht =

Zoroastrian religious hymn

- ← Den Yasht Ashtad Yasht →
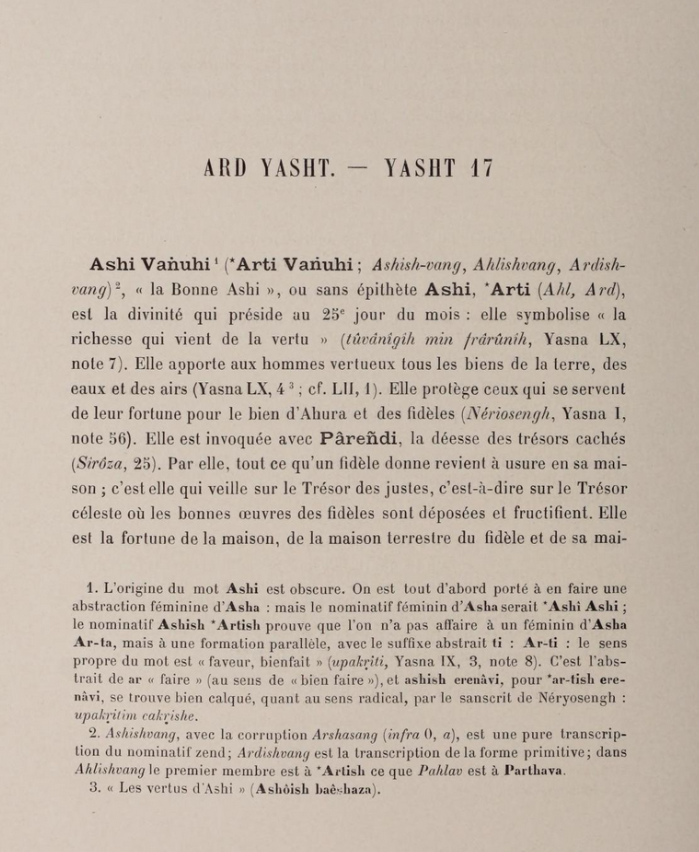
- First page of the Ard Yasht in Darmesteter's French translation

Information
- Religion: Zoroastrianism
- Language: Avestan
- Period: Avestan period
- Chapters: 10 kardes
- Verses: 62

The Ard Yasht or Arshishvang Yasht is the seventeenth hymn of the 21 Yashts. It is named after and dedicated to the praise of Ashi, the Zoroastrian divinity representing recompense and capricious luck.

== Overview ==
The Ard Yasht consists of 62 stanzas, which are further grouped into 10 sections called kardas. This makes it relatively short among the so-called Great Yashts. Regardless, it is considered to be of high literary quality and covers a wide range of topics. The yasht does not have a commentary in Middle Persian. In the Zoroastrian calendar, it is celebrated on the 25th day of the month dedicated to Ashi.

== Name ==
In his edition of the Avesta, Geldner notes that the yasht is called both Ard and Arishvang in the different manuscript traditions. Here, Ard is the Middle Persian name for Avestan Ashi, whereas Arishvang is the name of Ashi is some Middle Persian sources, and is ultimately derived from Avestan Ashish vaŋuhi (the good Ashi). Ashi in turn is a personified abstraction of Avestan aṣ̌i/arti (Note: For the Avestan variation between ṣ̌ and rt see here.) with the meaning of the thing attained or reward.

== Structure and content ==
Following Darmesteter, the Ard Yasht can be divided thematically into several parts. The first part (kardas I-II) is dedicated to a description of Ashi's characteristics as a goddess of luck, and her connection with Zarathustra. The next part (kardas III-IX) follows the general outline of many of the so-called Legendary Yasht, by describing how legendary heroes of old offer sacrifice to her:

We sacrifice to Ashi Vanguhi, who is shining, high, tallformed, well worthy of sacrifice, with a loud-sounding chariot, strong, welfare-giving, healing, with fulness of intellect and powerful.

To her did Haoshyangha, the Paradhata, offer up a sacrifice, upon the enclosure of the Hara, the beautiful height, made by Mazda.

He begged of her a boon, saying: 'Grant me this, O great Ashi Vanguhi! that I may overcome all the daevas of Mazana; that I may never fear and bow through terror before the daevas, but that all the daevas may fear and bow in spite of themselves before me, that they may fear and flee down to darkness.'

The great Ashi Vanguhi ran and came to his side: Haoshyangha, the Paradhata, obtained that boon.
For her brightness and glory, I will offer her a sacrifice [...]

— Ard Yasht karda III: verses 17.23 - 17.26 (translated by James Darmesteter).

The rest of this part, i.e. kardas IV-IX, follows the same structure. Each karda starts with an introductory verse, followed by a few verses which describe the worshipper and the boon they requested from Ashi, and finally a verse how the request was granted by her. Next to Haosyangha, this list contains Yima Khshaéta (karda IV), Thraêtaona (karda V), Haoma (karda VI), Husravah (karda VII), Zarathustra (karda VIII) and Vishtaspa (karda IX). The same list is also found in Yasht 9, where the worship is, however, addressed to Drvaspa instead of Ashi. The last part (karda X) describes how Ashi will not accept worship from people, who cannot engage in reproductive sexual activity, or who do so outside a marital relationship. (Note: The latter refers to consensual relationships but may also include sexual assault depending on the translation.)
