= Asha =

Central and complex Zoroastrian theological concept

Asha (/ˈʌʃə/) or arta (/ˈɑːrtə/; Avestan: 𐬀𐬴𐬀 Aṣ̌a / Arta) is a Zoroastrian concept with a complex and highly nuanced range of meaning. It is commonly summarized in accord with its contextual implications of 'truth' and 'right' (or 'righteousness'), 'order' and 'right working'. It is of cardinal importance to Zoroastrian theology and doctrine. In the moral sphere, aṣ̌a/arta represents what has been called "the decisive confessional concept of Zoroastrianism". The opposite of aṣ̌a is druj (Avestan: 𐬛𐬭𐬎𐬘, lit. 'deceit, falsehood').

Its Old Persian equivalent is arta-.^{[c]} In Middle Iranian languages the term appears as ard-.^{[a]}

The word is also the proper name of the divinity Asha, the Amesha Spenta that is the hypostasis or "genius" of "Truth" or "Righteousness". In the Younger Avesta, this figure is more commonly referred to as Asha Vahishta (Aṣ̌a Vahišta, Arta Vahišta), "Best Truth".^{[b]} The Middle Persian descendant is Ashawahist or Ardwahisht; New Persian Ardibehesht or Ordibehesht. In the Gathas—the oldest texts of Zoroastrianism, thought to have been composed by Zoroaster—it is seldom possible to distinguish between moral principle and the divinity. Later texts consistently use the 'Best' epithet when speaking of the Amesha Spenta; only once in the Gathas is 'best' an adjective of aṣ̌a/arta. The Ashem Vohu, which is one of the most important prayers Zoroastrianism is dedicated to Asha.

== Etymology ==
Avestan aṣ̌a and its Vedic equivalent ṛtá both derive from Proto-Indo-Iranian *Hṛtá- "truth", which in turn continues PIE *h₂r-to- "properly joined, right, true", from the root *h₂er. The word is attested in Old Persian as arta.

It is unclear whether the Avestan variation between aṣ̌a and arta is merely orthographical. Benveniste suggested š was only a convenient way of writing rt and should not be considered phonetically relevant. According to Gray, ṣ̌ is a misreading, representing – not /ʃ/ - but /rr/, of uncertain phonetic value but "probably" representing a voiceless r. Miller suggested that rt was restored when a scribe was aware of the morpheme boundary between the /r/ and /t/ (that is, whether the writer maintained the –ta suffix).^{[h]}

Avestan druj, like its Vedic Sanskrit cousin druh, appears to derive from the PIE root *dhreugh, also continued in Persian دروغ d[o]rūġ "lie", Welsh drwg "evil", and German Trug "fraud, deception". Old Norse draugr and Middle Irish airddrach mean "spectre, spook". The Sanskrit cognate druh means "affliction, afflicting demon". In Avestan, druj- has a secondary derivation, the adjective drəguuaṇt- (Young Avestan druuaṇt-), "partisan of deception, deceiver" for which the superlative draojišta- and perhaps the comparative draoj(ii)ah- are attested (Kellens, 2010, pp. 69 ff.).

== Meaning ==
Aṣ̌a "cannot be precisely rendered by some single word in another tongue" but may be summarized as follows:

It is, first of all, 'true statement'. This 'true statement', because it is true, corresponds to an objective, material reality that embraces all of existence. Recognized in it is a great cosmic principle since all things happen according to it.^{[j]} "This cosmic [...] force is imbued also with morality, as verbal Truth, 'la parole conforme', and Righteousness, action conforming with the moral order."

The correspondence between "truth", reality and an all-encompassing cosmic principle is not far removed from Heraclitus' conception of Logos.

=== As "truth" ===
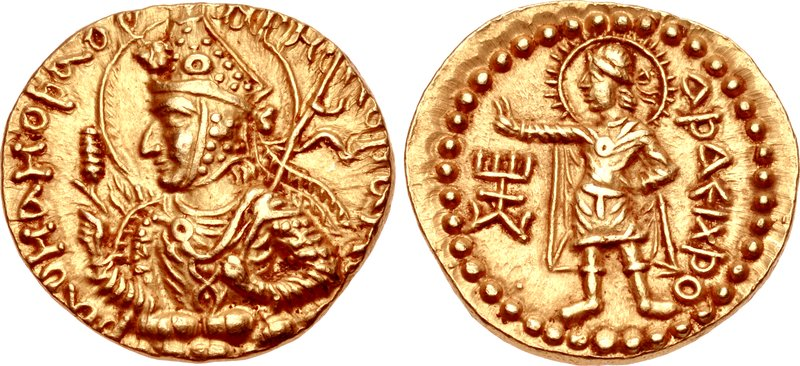
Coinage of Kushan ruler Huvishka, with "Asha Vahishta" (ΑϷΑΕΙΧϷΟ, Ashaiexsho) on the reverse

Both Avestan aṣ̌a/arta and Vedic ŗtá- are commonly translated as "truth" as this best reflects both the original meaning of the term as well as the opposition to their respective antonyms. The opposite of Avestan aṣ̌a/arta is druj-, "lie." Similarly, the opposites of Vedic ṛtá- are ánṛta- and druh, likewise "lie".

That "truth" is also what was commonly understood by the term as attested in Greek myth of Isis and Osiris 47, Plutarch calls the divinity Αλήθεια Aletheia, "Truth."

=== As "existence" ===
The adjective corresponding to the noun aṣ̌a/arta, "truth", is Avestan haithya- (haiθiia-), "true", the opposite of which is also druj-. Avestan haithya- derives from Indo-Iranian *sātya that in turn derives from Indo-European *h_{1}s-ṇt- "being, existing". The Sanskrit cognate sátya- means "true" in the sense of "really existing." This meaning is also preserved in Avestan, for instance in the expression haiθīm varəz, "to make true" as in "to bring to realization."

Another meaning of "reality" may be inferred from the component parts of the aṣ̌a/arta: from (root) ŗ with a substantivizing -ta suffix. The root ŗ corresponds to Old Avestan arəta- and Younger Avestan ərəta- "established", hence aṣ̌a/arta "that which is established."

The synonymy of aṣ̌a and "existence" overlaps with the stock identification of Ahura Mazda as the creator (of existence itself). Truth is existence (creation) inasmuch as falsehood is non-existence (uncreated, anti-created). Also, because aṣ̌a is everything that druj- is not (or vice versa), since aṣ̌a is, druj- is not.

This notion is already expressed in the Avesta itself, such as in the first Yasht, dedicated to Ahura Mazda, in which the "fifth name is the whole good existence of Mazda, the seed of Asha" ( Yasht 1.7). Similarly, in the mythology of Gandarəβa, the 'yellow-heeled' dragon of the druj- that emerges from the deep to destroy the "living world (creation) of Aṣ̌a" (Yasht 19.41)

In the ethical goals of Zoroastrianism ("good thoughts, good words, good deeds"), Vohu Manah is active in good thoughts, Sraosha in good words and Aṣ̌a in good deeds. (Denkard 3.13-14). Aṣ̌a is thus "represented as active and effective."

=== As "right working" ===
Subject to context, aṣ̌a/arta- is also frequently translated as "right working" or "[that which is] right". The word then (cf. Bartholomae's and Geldner's translations as German language "Recht") has the same range of meaning of "right" as in the English language: truth, righteousness, rightfulness, lawfullness, conformity, accord, order (cosmic order, social order, moral order).

These various meanings of "right" are frequently combined, such as "the inexorable law of righteousness," or as "the eternal fitness of things that are in accord with the divine order."

As (the hypostasis of) regularity and "right working", aṣ̌a/arta- is present when Ahura Mazda fixed the course of the sun, the moon and the stars (Yasna 44.3), and it is through aṣ̌a that plants grow (Yasna 48.6).

"Right working" also overlaps with both Indo-European *ár- "to (properly) join together" and with the notion of existence and realization (to make real). The word for "established", arəta-, also means "proper". The antonymic anarəta- (or anarəθa-) means "improper". In Zoroastrian tradition, prayers must be enunciated with care for them to be effective. The Indo-Iranian formula *sātyas mantras (Yasna 31.6: haiθīm mathrem) "does not simply mean 'true Word' but formulated thought which is in conformity with the reality' or 'poetic (religious) formula with inherent fulfillment (realization)'".

=== In comparison to Vedic usage ===
The kinship between Old Iranian aṣ̌a-/arta- and Vedic ŗtá- is evident in numerous formulaic phrases and expressions that appear in both the Avesta and in the RigVeda. For instance, the *ŗtásya path, "path of truth", is attested multiple times in both sources: Y 51.13, 72.11; RV 3.12.7, 7.66.3. Similarly "source of truth", Avestan aṣ̌a khá and Vedic khâm ṛtásya (Y 10.4; RV 2.28.5)

The adjective corresponding to Avestan aṣ̌a/arta- is haiθiia- "true". Similarly, the adjective corresponding to Vedic ŗtá- "truth" is sátya- "true". The opposite of both aṣ̌a/arta- and haithya- is druj- "lie" or "false". In contrast, in the Vedas the opposite of both ŗtá- and sátya- is druh- and ánŗta-, also "lie" or "false".

However, while the Indo-Iranian concept of truth is attested throughout Zoroastrian tradition, ŗtá- disappears in post-Vedic literature and is not preserved in post-Vedic texts. On the other hand, sátya- and ánrta- both survive in classical Sanskrit.

The main theme of the Rig Veda, "the truth and the gods", is not evident in the Gathas. Thematic parallels between aṣ̌a/arta and ŗtá-, however, exist such as in Yasht 10, the Avestan hymn to Mithra. There, Mithra, who is the hypostasis and the preserver of covenant, is the protector of aṣ̌a/arta. RigVedic Mitra is likewise preserver of ŗtá-.

== Fire as the agent of Truth ==
Asha Vahishta is closely associated with fire. Fire is "grandly conceived as a force informing all the other Amesha Spentas, giving them warmth and the spark of life." In Yasht 17.20, Angra Mainyu clamours that Zoroaster burns him with Asha Vahishta. In Vendidad 4.54-55, speaking against the truth and violating the sanctity of promise is detected by the consumption of "water, blazing, of golden color, having the power to detect guilt."

This analogy of truth that burns and detecting truth through fire is already attested in the very earliest texts, that is, in the Gathas and in the Yasna Haptanghaiti. In Yasna 43–44, Ahura Mazda dispenses justice through radiance of His fire and the strength of aṣ̌a. Fire "detects" sinners "by hand-grasping" (Yasna 34.4). An individual who has passed the fiery test (garmo-varah, ordeal by heat), has attained physical and spiritual strength, wisdom, truth and love with serenity (Yasna 30.7). Altogether, "there are said to have been some 30 kinds of fiery tests in all." According to the post-Sassanid Dadestan i denig (I.31.10), at the final judgement a river of molten metal will cover the earth. The righteous, as they wade through this river, will perceive the molten metal as a bath of warm milk. The wicked will be scorched. For details on aṣ̌a's role in personal and final judgement, see aṣ̌a in eschatology, below.

Fire is moreover the "auxiliary of the truth," "and not only, as in the ordeal, of justice and of truth at the same time." In Yasna 31.19, "the man who thinks of aṣ̌a, [...] who uses his tongue in order to speak correctly, [does so] with the aid of brilliant fire". In Yasna 34-44 devotees "ardently desire [Mazda's] mighty fire, through aṣ̌a." In Yasna 43–44, Ahura Mazda "shall come to [Zoroaster] through the splendour of [Mazda's] fire, possessing the strength of (through) aṣ̌a and good mind (=Vohu Manah)." That fire "possesses strength through aṣ̌a" is repeated again in Yasna 43.4. In Yasna 43.9, Zoroaster, wishing to serve fire, gives his attention to aṣ̌a. In Yasna 37.1, in a list of what are otherwise all physical creations, aṣ̌a takes the place of fire.

Asha Vahishta's association with atar is carried forward in the post-Gathic texts, and they are often mentioned together. In Zoroastrian cosmogony, each of the Amesha Spentas represents one aspect of creation and one of seven primordial elements that in Zoroastrian tradition are the basis of that creation. In this matrix, aṣ̌a/arta is the origin of fire, Avestan atar, which permeates through all Creation. The correspondence then is that aṣ̌a/arta "penetrates all ethical life, as fire penetrates all physical being."

In the liturgy Asha Vahishta is frequently invoked together with fire. (Yasna l.4, 2.4, 3.6, 4.9, 6.3, 7.6, 17.3, 22.6, 59.3, 62.3 etc.). In one passage, fire is a protector of aṣ̌a: "when the Evil Spirit assailed the creation of Good Truth, Good Thought and Fire intervened" (Yasht 13.77)

In later Zoroastrian tradition, Asha Vahishta is still at times identified with the fire of the household hearth.

== In eschatology and soteriology ==
In addition to the role of fire as the agent of Truth, fire, among its various other manifestations, is also "the fire of judicial ordeal, prototype of the fiery torrent of judgement day, when all will receive their just deserts 'by fire and by Aṣ̌a' (Y 31.3)."

In the Avesta, the "radiant quarters" of aṣ̌a is "the best existence", i.e. Paradise (cf. Vendidad 19.36), entry to which is restricted to those who are recognized as "possessing truth" (aṣ̌avan). The key to this doctrine is Yasna 16.7: "We worship the radiant quarters of Aṣ̌a in which dwell the souls of the dead, the Fravašis of the aṣ̌avans; the best existence (=Paradise) of the aṣ̌avans we worship, (which is) light and according all comforts."

'Aṣ̌a' derives from the same Proto-Indo-European root as 'Airyaman', the divinity of healing who is closely associated with Asha Vahishta. At the last judgement, the common noun airyaman is an epithet of the saoshyans, the saviours that bring about the final renovation of the world. The standing epithet of these saviour figures is 'astvatәrәta', which likewise has arta as an element of the name. These saviours are those who follow Ahura Mazda's teaching "with acts inspired by aṣ̌a" (Yasna 48.12). Both Airyaman and Asha Vahishta (as also Atar) are closely associated with Sraosha "[Voice of] Conscience" and guardian of the Chinvat bridge across which souls must pass.

According to a lost Avestan passage that is only preserved in a later (9th century) Pahlavi text, towards the end of time and the final renovation, Aṣ̌a and Airyaman will together come upon the earth to do battle with the Az, the daeva of greed (Zatspram 34.38-39).

The Ardwahisht Yasht, which is nominally addressed to Asha Vahishta, is in fact mostly devoted to the praise of the airyaman ishya (airyәmā īšyo, "Longed-for airyaman"), the fourth of the four great Gathic prayers. In present-day Zoroastrianism it is considered to invoke Airyaman just as the Ashem Vohu, is the second of the four great Gathic prayers, is dedicated to Aṣ̌a. All four prayers (the first is the Ahuna Vairya, the third is the Yenghe Hatam) have judgement and/or salvation as a theme, and all four call on the Truth.

It is Airyaman that – together with fire – will "melt the metal in the hills and mountains, and it will be upon the earth like a river" (Bundahishn 34.18). In Zoroastrian tradition, metal is the domain of Xshathra [Vairya], the Amesha Spenta of "[Desirable] Dominion", with whom Aṣ̌a is again frequently identified. Dominion is moreover "a form of truth and results from truth."

In Denkard 8.37.13, Asha Vahishta actually takes over Airyaman's healer role as the healer of all spiritual ills and Airyaman then only retains the role of healer of corporeal ills. Although Airyaman has no dedication in the Siroza, the invocations to the divinities of the Zoroastrian calendar, Airyaman is twice invoked together with Aṣ̌a. (Siroza 1.3 and 2.3)

Aogemadaecha 41-47 prototypes death as a journey that has to be properly prepared for: As mortals acquires material goods as they go through life, so also should they furnish themselves with spiritual stores of righteousness. They will then be well provisioned when they embark on the journey from which they will not return.

Aṣ̌a's role is not limited to judgement: In Bundahishn 26.35, Aṣ̌a prevents daevas from exacting too great a punishment to souls consigned to the House of Lies. Here, Aṣ̌a occupies the position that other texts assign to Mithra, who is traditionally identified with fairness.

For the relationship between Aṣ̌a, eschatology and Nowruz, see in the Zoroastrian calendar, below.

Although there are numerous eschatological parallels between Aṣ̌a and Aši "recompense, reward" (most notably their respective associations with Sraosha and Vohu Manah), and are on occasion even mentioned together (Yasna 51.10), the two are not etymologically related. The feminine abstract noun aši/arti derives from ar-, "to allot, to grant." Aši also has no Vedic equivalent.

== In relationship to the other Amesha Spentas ==
In Zoroastrian cosmogony and cosmology, which—though alluded to in the Gathas—is only systematically described in Zoroastrian tradition (e.g. Bundahishn 3.12), aṣ̌a is the second (cf. Yasna 47.1) of the six primeval creations realized ("created by His thought") by Ahura Mazda. It is through these six, the Amesha Spentas that all subsequent creation was accomplished.

In addition to Asha Vahishta's role as an Amesha Spenta and hence one of the primordial creations through which all other creation was realized, Truth is one of the "organs, aspects or emanations" of Ahura Mazda through which the Creator acts and is immanent in the world.

Although Vohu Manah regularly stands first in the list of the Amesha Spenta (and of Ahura Mazda's creations), in the Gathas Asha Vahishta is the most evident of the six, and also the most commonly associated with Wisdom (Mazda). In the 238 verses of these hymns, Aṣ̌a appears 157 times. Of the other concepts, only Vohu Manah "Good Purpose" appears nearly as often (136 occurrences). In comparison, the remaining four of the great sextet appear only 121 times altogether.

Although a formal hierarchy is not evident in the Gathas, the group of six "divides naturally into three dyads." In this arrangement, Aṣ̌a is paired with Vohu Manah. This reflects the frequency in which the two appear (together) in the Gathas and is in turn reflected in Zoroastrian tradition. In Bundahishn 26.8, Vohu Manah stands at the left hand of God, while Aṣ̌a stands at the right.

== In divine epithets ==
=== Of Ahura Mazda ===
Yasht 1, the hymn dedicated to Ahura Mazda, provides a list of 74 "names" by which the Creator is invoked.^{[f]} In the numbered list of Yasht 1.7, 'Asha Vahishta' "Best Truth" is the fourth name. A later verse, Yasht 1.12, includes 'Aṣ̌avan' "Possessing Truth" and 'Aṣ̌avastəma' "Most Righteous". In Yasna 40.3, Ahura Mazda is aṣ̌aŋāč "having aṣ̌a following".

=== Of other divinities ===
One of Haoma's stock epithets is aṣ̌avazah- "furthering aṣ̌a" (Yasht 20.3; Yasna 8.9, 10.1.14, 11.10 et al.). Atar "possesses strength through aṣ̌a" (aṣ̌a-ahojah, Yasna 43.4).

== In the Zoroastrian calendar ==
In the Zoroastrian calendar, the third day of the month and the second month of the year are dedicated to and named after aṣ̌a and Asha Vahishta (calledارديبهشت Ordibehesht in Modern Persian both in Iranian Calendar and Yazdgerdi calendar).

A special service to aṣ̌a and Aṣ̌a, known as the 'Jashan of Ardavisht', is held on the day on which month-name and day-name dedications intersect. In the Fasli and Bastani variants of the Zoroastrian calendar, this falls on April 22.

Rapithwin, one of the five gahs (watches) of the day, under the protection of Aṣ̌a. (Bundahishn 3.22) This implies that all prayers recited between noon and three invoke Aṣ̌a. Noon is considered to be the "perfect" time, at which instant the world was created and at which instant time will stop on the day of the final renovation of the world.

In the winter months, the daevic time of year, Rapithwin is known as the Second Havan (the first Havan being from dawn to noon), and with the first day of spring, March 21, Rapithwin symbolically returns. This day, March 21, is Nowruz

Nowruz, the holiest of all Zoroastrian festivals is dedicated to Aṣ̌a. It follows immediately after Pateti, the day of introspection and the Zoroastrian equivalent of All-Souls Day. Nowruz, Zoroastrianism's New Year's Day, is celebrated on the first day of spring, traditionally understood to be the day of rebirth, and literally translated means "New Day". The first month of the year of the Zoroastrian calendar is Farvadin, which is dedicated to and named after the Fravašis, the ancestral higher spirits.

"The underlying idea of the dedication" of the second month of the year to Asha Vahishta "may be revivification of the earth after the death of winter."

== Iconography ==
On Kushan coins, Asha Vahishta "appears as Aṣ̌aeixšo, with a diadem and nimbus, like Mithra in the same series."

== In proper names ==
"Arta- (Mid. Iranian ard-), representing either the Av. divinity Aṣ̌a or the principle aṣ̌a, occurs frequently as an element in Iranian personal names."

Hellenized/Latinized names include:

- Artabanos (Greek, Latin Artabanus, Modern Persian اردوان Ardavān), from *Artabānu "glory of arta".
- Artabazanes (Latin) a variant of either Artabazus or Artabrzana
- Artabazus, Artabazos (Greek, Latin Artavasdes), attested as Avestan Ashavazdah, perhaps meaning "powerful/persevering through arta"
- Artabrzana (Greek), from *Artabrzana "exalting arta"
- Artaphrenes (Greek), either from Artamainyu "spirit of arta" (phrene: Greek 'spirit') or a corruption of Artafarnah "[divine] Glory of arta"
- Artasyras (Greek), from *Artasura, "powerful through arta"
- Artaxata, Artaxiasata (Greek, Armenian Artashat), meaning "joy of arta".
- Artaxias (Greek, Armenian Artashes), from an Aramaic form of Artaxṣ̌acā (Artaxerxes, see below).
- Artaxerxes (Latin, variant Artoxerxes, Greek Artaxesses, Hebrew/Aramaic Artaxṣ̌ast or Artaxṣ̌asta), a compound of Arta and Xerxes, the latter not being a part of the original Old Persian Artaxṣ̌acā, "whose reign is through arta" or "dominion of arta."
- Ardahan, Ardahan (Turkish, Georgian Artaani), meaning "city of arta".
- Artazostre (Greek), from *Artazaushri "who is in favor of arta" or "who takes delight in arta"
- Artembares (Greek), from *Artempara "who encourages arta" or "who furthers arta."

Other names include:

- Artavardiya (Old Persian) and Irdumardiya (Elamite), meaning "doer of Justice"
- Arda Viraz, the "righteous Viraz" (having an eschatological connotation)
- Ardeshir, Middle Persian form of Old Persian Artaxṣ̌acā (i.e. Artaxerxes), literally "whose reign is through arta"; actually means "Holy Kingship".

Middle Iranian ard- is also suggested to be the root of names of the current day Iranian cities of Ardabil, Ardekan, Ardehal and Ardestan.

== See also ==
- Ṛta
- Vasishtha
- Truth
- Ma'at
- Logos (Christianity)
- Brahman
- Tao
- Teotl

== Notes ==
a)	Middle Iranian ard- denoting aša-/arta- should not be confused with another ard-, denoting "fortune." The latter derives from Avestan aši- or arti-, which has a different gender.
b)	Avestan vahišta (as in Asha Vahishta) is a superlative of the adjective vohu- "good", hence "vahišta" "best". As a noun however, "vohu-" means "possession".
c)	Aside from its use in proper names, Old Persian ạrta is only attested in one source, Xerxes' "daiva inscription" (XPh). In this one text, the word appears in two forms: One form is as adjectival ạrtavan-, which corresponds to Avestan ašavan-. The other form is in a thrice-repeated phrase ạrtācā brazmaniya, the reading/meaning of which is not conclusively established. For a review of various interpretations, see Kent, 1945 and Skjærvø, 1987.
d)	This meaning of ašavan was not considered in some translations of other texts, leading to the assumption that the Avesta did not preserve all nuances of Indo-Iranian *ŗtávan.
e)	The doctrinal basis for this extension of meaning is uncertain, but is "probably" due to the polar opposition of ašavan to drəgvant "liar" (YAv. drvant). It could then also be a continuation of the principle that ašavan is not only an intrinsic property of divinities, but also applies to everything that pertains to the domain of Ahura Mazda and/or Aša, and thus everything that is not drəgvant/drvant.
f)	Aša appears as "holy" in Darmesteter's 1883 translation of Yasht 1 (in SBE 23).
g)	Saoshyant may have been a term originally applied to Zoroaster himself (e.g. Yasna 46.3)
h)	Miller maintains "/Ř/ is the normal phonological reflex of *-rt-, and that rt has been restored according to Kuryłowicz's 'Fourth Law of Analogy' in motivating categories where there was still awareness of a morpheme boundary between the /r/ and the /t/." That is, "rt passes to š by a regular phonological law, and š was then replaced morphologically by rt when the morpheme cut was still evident."
j)	The source reads: "We can conclude, without entering into more detail, that Iran, as India, presents us with a term which has had to signify first of all 'true statement'; that this statement, because it was true, had to correspond to an objective, material reality; and that, as the discourse did, this reality must embrace all things; and, finally that one recognized in it a great cosmic principle since all things happen according to it."

== Bibliography ==
- Babbitt, Frank Cole (ed., trans.) (1936), Plutarch: Moralia: Volume V. Isis and Osiris, Cambridge: Harvard UP (Loeb Classical Library) p. 115.
- Bartholomae, Christian (1904), Altiranisches Wörterbuch, Strassburg: Trübner (fasc., 1979, Berlin: de Gruyter)
- Boyce, Mary (1970), "Zoroaster the Priest", Bulletin of the School of Oriental and African Studies, 33 (1): 22–38, doi:10.1017/S0041977X00145100, S2CID 170473160
- Boyce, Mary (1975), A History of Zoroastrianism, Vol. I, Leiden/Köln: Brill
- Boyce, Mary (1987), "Ardwashišt", Encyclopedia Iranica, vol. 2, New York: Routledge & Kegan Paul: 389-390
- Boyce, Mary (1989), "Ātaš", Encyclopedia Iranica, vol. 3, New York: Routledge & Kegan Paul: 1-5
- Dani, Ahmad Hasan; Harmatta, János (1999), History of Civilizations of Central Asia, Motilal Banarsidass Publ., ISBN 978-81-208-1408-0
- Dhalla, Maneckji Nusservanji (1938), History of Zoroastrianism, New York: OUP
- Duchesne-Guillemin, Jacques (1963), "Heraclitus and Iran", History of Religions, 3 (1): 34–49, doi:10.1086/462470, S2CID 62860085
- Geldner, Karl (1908), Religionsgeschichtliches Lesebuch – die Zoroastrische Religion, Tübingen: JC Mohr
- Gershevitch, Ilya (1955), "Word and Spirit in Ossetic", Bulletin of the School of Oriental and African Studies, 17 (3): 478–489, doi:10.1017/S0041977X0011239X, S2CID 194030467
- Gershevitch, Ilya (1964), "Zoroaster's Own Contribution", Journal of Near Eastern Studies, 23 (1): 12–38, doi:10.1086/371754, S2CID 161954467
- Gnoli, Gerardo (1987), "Ašavan", Encyclopaedia Iranica, vol. 2, New York: Routledge & Kegan Paul: 705-706
- Gray, Louis H. (1904), "The Origin of the Names of the Avesta Months", The American Journal of Semitic Languages and Literatures, 20 (3): 194–201, doi:10.1086/369511, S2CID 170668526
- Gray, Louis H. (1926), "List of the Divine and Demonic Epithets in the Avesta", Journal of the American Oriental Society, 46: 97–153, doi:10.2307/593793, JSTOR 593793
- Gray, Louis H. (1941), "On Avesta Š = ÁRT, Ṛ́T, ŌI = AI, and Å̄ = Ā(H)", Journal of the American Oriental Society, 61 (2): 101–104, doi:10.2307/594254, JSTOR 594254
- Kent, Roland G. (1945), "Old Persian artācā brazmaniya", Language, 21 (4): 223–229, doi:10.2307/409690, JSTOR 409690
- Lommel, Hermann (1930), Die Religion Zarathushtras nach dem Avesta dargestellt, Tübingen: JC Mohr
- Miller, Gary D. (1968), "rt-Clusters in Avestan", Language, 44 (2.1): 274–283, doi:10.2307/411623, JSTOR 411623
- Schlerath, Bernfried (1968), Awesta Wörterbuch, Vorarbeiten II: Konkordanz, Wiesbaden: O. Harrassowitz
- Schlerath, Bernfried (1987), "Aša: Avestan Aša", Encyclopaedia Iranica, vol. 2, New York: Routledge & Kegan Paul: 694-696
- Skjærvø, Prods Oktor (1987), "Aša: Old Persian Ạrta", Encyclopaedia Iranica, vol. 2, New York: Routledge & Kegan Paul: 696
- Williams Jackson, A. V. (1913), "The Ancient Persian Conception of Salvation according to the Avesta, or Bible of Zoroaster", The American Journal of Theology, 17 (2): 195–205, doi:10.1086/479172, hdl:2027/nnc1.cu58974733
- Zaehner, Richard Charles (1961), The Dawn and Twilight of Zoroastrianism, New York: Putnam
