= Katāyoun =

Female figure in Iranian mythology

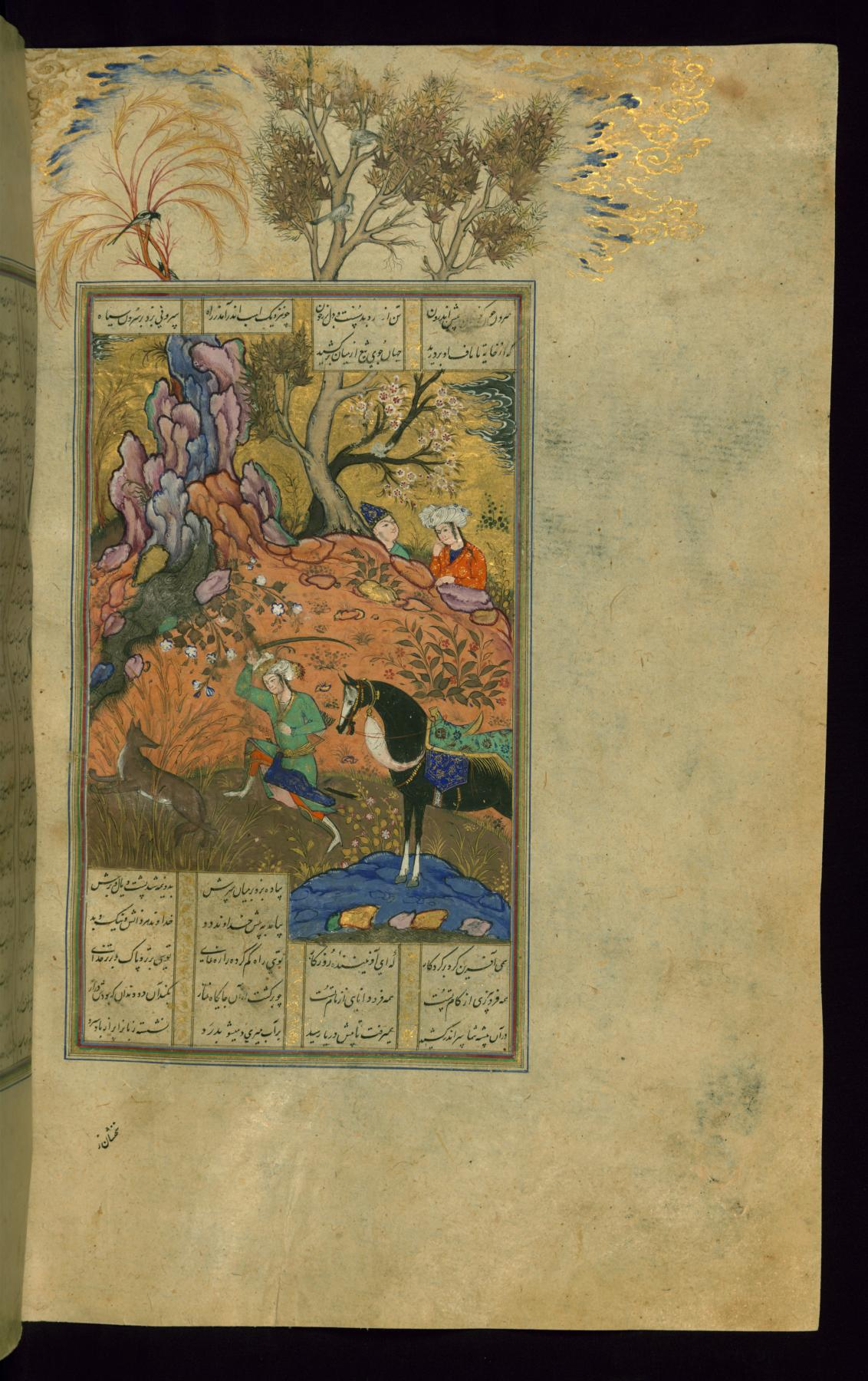
- Katayoun watches the Goshtasp bravery
- Post: Queen of Iran
- Father: Kaiser Rûm

In-universe information
- Nickname: Princess Rûm
- Spouse: Goshtasp
- Children: Esfandiyar and Zarir
- Nationality: Ancient Rome

Katāyoun (Persian: کَتایون) is a female figure in the Shāhnāmeh and Iranian mythology. She is married to Goshtāsb and the mother of Esfandiār. In the Shāhnāme, she is the daughter of the Kaiser of Rûm, while in both the Avestā and in Pahlavi texts, she is called Hutaosā and identified as an Iranian girl and a descendant of Nowzar.

== In Shāhnāmeh ==
Goshtāsb is the son of Lohrāsp, the shahanshah of Iran. Goshtāsb asks his father to become king, but his father rejects this request and because of this, Goshtāsb goes to Rûm. The Kaiser of Rûm has a daughter, named Katāyoun, and he wants to find a husband for her. One night Katāyoun sees a dream in which a stranger (Goshtāsb) offers her a bouquet and she accepts. When the Kaiser invites the nobles and grandees of the country to a feast, Katāyoun meets Goshtāsb and they fall in love. The Kaiser is opposed to this marriage, however, in Rûm, women are free in choosing their husbands and the Bishop of Rûm warns Kaiser that his opposition is in contradiction to this custom. The Kaiser has no way other than to accept this marriage, however, after the marriage of Katāyoun and Goshtāsb, he invalidates this custom and impose difficult conditions for anyone that wants to marry his two other girls, one of them has to kill a wolf, and the other has to kill a dragon that lives in the mount Saqilā. The daughters have suitors already, but they are unable to do these jobs. Fortune-tellers say to them that no one could do these jobs, except a man from Iran that has previously married the daughter of Kaiser. Then they find Goshtāsb and ask him to kill the wolf and the dragon for them, and Goshtāsb is able to do so. Kaiser, who does not know that Goshtāsb has killed the wolf and the dragon, invites all nobles of the country to a feast. Katāyoun asks Goshtāsb to go to this feast and in there, Kaiser sees Goshtāsb's skills in horse-riding and shooting with bow, and finally he discovers that it was Goshtāsb that killed the wolf and the dragon. Kaiser then apologizes Goshtāsb for not accepting him as his son-in-law at the first place. Goshtāsb then become a grandee in the court of Kaiser and Kaiser sends him to suppress a rebellion from Elyās, the king of Khazars. The reputation of Goshtāsb reaches to an extent that Kaiser sends an ambassador to Lohrāsp, the Shah of Iran, and asks him to pay tribute. When Lohrāsp finds out that Goshtāsb is in the court of Kaiser and has married his daughter, he sends his other son, Zarir, to Rûm in order to bring Goshtāsb and Katāyoun back to Iran. Lohrāsp then makes Goshtāsb the Shahanshah of Iran.

== See also ==
- Ketevan
- Katayun (name)

== Sources ==
- Ferdowsi Shahnameh. From the Moscow version. Mohammed Publishing. ISBN 964-5566-35-5
