= Peshotanu =

Eschatological figure of the medieval texts of Zoroastrian tradition

Peshotanu (Avestan Pəšōtanu, Middle Persian Peshyotan, Peshotan) is an eschatological figure of the medieval texts of Zoroastrian tradition, in particular in the apocalyptic Zand-i Wahman yasn.

In these texts, Peshotanu is an assistant of the Saoshyant, the future benefactor who brings about the final renovation of the world. In these texts, Peshotanu is also one of the Zoroastrian "immortals" (anoshag-ruwan, "of immortal soul"), and the name peshotanu is an allusion to this idea; the Avestan language word literally means "of surrendered (pesh-) body (-tan)", and is also used as a common adjective as a euphemism for "deceased" (also in a derogatory sense of "of forfeited body" in the context of capital offenses). The development of the legend of Peshotanu has been traced from that of a dead prince whose departed spirit is honored (Yasht 13.103) to that of the eschatological hero who is "he is immortal, undecaying, hungerless, and thirstless, living and predominant in both existences, those of the embodied beings and of the spirits." (Denkard 4.81)

In the genealogy of the legendary Kayanians, Peshotanu is the youngest son of Vishtaspa (Wistasp, Goshtasp, the patron of Zoroaster), and brother of Spentodata (Spandadat, Esfandiyar). In various texts, Peshotanu is portrayed as one of seven "immortal rulers", residing in Kangdez — a mythical "Fort of Kang" that was initially in the other world (at "star level") but invited down to earth where it landed in eastern Turan (Pahlavi Rivāyat 49). At the fort, Peshotanu and Hvarchithra (Khwarshedchehr), respectively the younger sons of Vishtaspa and Zoroaster, together with their righteous (ahlav) army, await the final battle against Ahriman and his creatures. This description appears in Bundahishn XXXIII, Denkard VII and IX, and in Zand-i Wahman yasn VII. In Denkard IX, this information is attributed to the lost Sudgar Nask.

The principal source of information on the figure is the apocalyptic Zand-i Wahman yasn (also incorrectly known as the Zand-i Vohuman Yasn or Bahman Yasht, which – despite these names – has neither to do with Vohu Manah nor is it an Avestan language Yasht). The Zand-i Wahman yasn is a pseudo-prophetic account of what was to happen to the Zoroastrians and their religion in the future. In the second half of that text, Peshotan is described as a "protector of the religion", who brings about a revival of the faith at the end of the "eleventh millennium." Until that revival – which supposedly will come when the daevas will have exceeded their term of rule by 1,000 years – Peshotanu remains at "Khandez" with 150 of his disciples. Thereafter, so the tale, Peshotanu will come down to battle the armies of the demons and restore Iran and its religion. In the fight, Mihr (Avestan: Mithra) will intervene on Peshotanu's behalf, and together they will drive the demon Kheshm (Avestan: Aeshma) and his forces back into the underworld.
