= Luarsab =

Luarsab may refer to:

- Luarsab I (died 1556), King of the Georgian Kingdom of Kartli from 1527 to 1556;
- Luarsab II (1592–1622), King of the Georgian Kingdom of Kartli from 1606 to 1615, Marty and Saint of the Georgian Orthodox Church;
- Luarsab (given name)
