= Avoyan =

Avoyan (Armenian: Ավոյան) is a popular Armenian surname. Notable people with the surname include:

- Artashes Avoyan (born 1972), Armenian lawyer
- Hovhannes Avoyan (born 1965), Armenian entrepreneur
- Tatoul Avoyan (born 1964), Armenian rabiz singer
