= Vishtaspa =

Figure in Zoroastrianism

Vishtaspa (Avestan: 𐬬𐬌𐬱𐬙𐬁𐬯𐬞𐬀 Vištāspa; Old Persian: 𐎻𐏁𐎫𐎠𐎿𐎱 Vištāspa; Persian: گشتاسپ Guštāsp; Ancient Greek: Ὑστάσπης Hustáspēs) is the Avestan-language name of a figure appearing in Zoroastrian scripture and tradition, portrayed as an early follower of Zoroaster, and his patron, and instrumental in the diffusion of the prophet's message. Although Vishtaspa is not epigraphically attested, he is – like Zoroaster – traditionally assumed to have been a historical figure, although obscured by accretions from legend and myth.

In Zoroastrian tradition, which builds on allusions found in the Avesta, Vishtaspa is a righteous king who ruled from Bactria (present-day Afghanistan), and helped propagate and defend the faith. In the non-Zoroastrian Sistan cycle texts, Vishtaspa is a loathsome ruler of the Kayanian dynasty who intentionally sends his eldest son to a certain death. In Greco-Roman literature, Zoroaster's patron was the pseudo-anonymous author of a set of prophecies written under his name.

== In the Avesta ==
Vishtaspa is referred to in the Gathas, the oldest texts of Zoroastrianism which were considered to have been composed by Zoroaster himself. In these hymns, the poet speaks of Vishtaspa as his ally (Yasna 46. 14), follower of the path of Vohu Manah (Y. 51. 16), and committed to spreading the prophet's message (Y. 51. 16, 46. 15, 53. 2). In Yasna 28. 1–28. 7, Zoroaster appeals to Mazda for several boons, including the power to vanquish their foes for Vishtaspa and himself. Considered collectively, the Gathas celebrate Vishtaspa as the "patron of Zoroaster and the establisher of the first Zoroastrian community. "

The Gathic allusions recur in the Yashts of the Younger Avesta. The appeal to Mazda for a boon reappears in Yasht 5 (Yt. 5.98), where the boon is asked for the Haugvan (Note: YAv. Haugvan is Gathic Hvogva. Named members of this clan are Jamaspa and Frashaoshtra (Y 51. 17-18, Gatha 3), two members of Vishtaspa's court. In Yasna 53 (Gatha 5), Zoroaster is the celebrant priest at the marriage of his daughter, Pouruchista, to Jamaspa Hvogva. In Zoroastrian tradition (e.g. Denkard 21. 17), one of Zoroaster's wives, Hvovi, is the daughter of the other named Hvogva, Frashaoshtra.) and Naotara families, and in which Vishtaspa is said to be a member of the latter. (Note: In Yasht 15. 95–96, Vishtaspa's wife Hutaosa is also said to be a member of the Naotara clan. In Yasht 17, Ashi (Fortune) is said to have fled from the "swift-horsed" Naotaras. The meaning of this myth is obscure.) Later in the same hymn, Zoroaster is described as appealing to Mazda to "bring Vishtaspa, son of Aurvataspa, to think according to Daena (Religion), to speak according to the Religion, to act according to the Religion." (Yt. 5. 104–105). In Yasht 9. 25–26, the last part of which is an adaptation of the Gathic Yasna 49. 7, the prophet makes the same appeal with regard to Hutaosa, wife of Vishtaspa.

In Yasht 9.30, Vishtaspa himself appeals for the ability to drive off the attacks of the daeva-worshipping Arejataspa and other members of drujvant Hyaona family. Similarly in Yasht 5. 109, Vishtaspa pleads for strength that he may "crush Tathryavant of the bad religion, the daeva-worshipper Peshana, and the wicked Arejataspa." Elsewhere (Yt. 5. 112–113), Vishtaspa also pleads for strength on behalf of Zairivairi (Pahl. Zarēr), who in later tradition is said to be Vishtaspa's younger brother. The allusions to conflicts (perhaps battles, see below) are again obliquely referred to in Yasht 13 (Yt. 13.99–13.100), in which the fravashis of Zoroaster and Vishtaspa are described as victorious combatants for Asha, and the rescuers and furtherers of the religion. This description is repeated in Yasht 19 (Yt. 19.84–19.87), where Zoroaster, Vishtaspa and Vishtaspa's ancestors are additionally said to possess khvarenah. While the chief hero of the conflicts is said to be Vishtaspa's son, Spentodhata, (Yt. 13. 103) in Yasht 13. 100, Vishtaspa is proclaimed to have set his adopted faith "in the place of honor" amongst peoples.

Passages in the Frawardin Yasht (Yt. 13.99–13.103) and elsewhere have enabled commentators to infer family connections between Vishtaspa and several other figures named in the Avesta. The summaries of several lost Avestan texts (Wishtasp-sast nask, Spand nask, Chihrdad nask, and Warshtmansr nask), as reported in the Denkard (respectively 8. 11, 8. 13, 8. 14, and 9. 33. 5), suggest that there once existed a detailed "history" of Vishtaspa and his ancestors in scripture. The Yasht 13 mentions Zairiuuairi, Piší šiiaoθna (Vishtaspa's eschatological son Pišišōtan), Spəṇtōδāta (Spandyād), Bastauuairi (Bastwar), Kauuarazman, Frašaoštra and Jāmāspa (the Huuōguua brothers in the Gathas), all of whom are featured in the Pahlavi narrative about the war between Vishtaspa and Arzāsp (Arjāsp, king of the Xiiaonas). In Yasht 9.31, Vishtaspa prays to Druuāspā that he may successfully fight and kill various opponents and, apparently, turn Humaiiā and Varəδakanā away from the lands of the Xiiaonas.

In Yasna 12, the Zarathustra, Vishtaspa, Frašaoštra and Jāmāspa, and the three Saošiiaṇts, Zarathustra's eschatological sons, and in Yasna 23.2 and 26.5, the fravashi of Gaiia Marətān, Zarathustra, Vishtaspa, and Isaṯ.vāstra (another of Zarathustra's eschatological sons) are listed as the principal fighters for Asha.

The meaning of Vishtaspa's name is uncertain. Interpretations include "'he whose horses have (or horse has) come in ready (for riding, etc.)'"; "'he who has trained horses'"; and "'whose horses are released (for the race)'". (Note: For a review of older (early 20th century) interpretations, see Kent 1945, pp. 55–57.) It agrees with the description from Yasht 5.132 in which was a prototypical winner of the chariot race.

== In tradition and folklore ==
=== In Zoroastrian tradition ===
In the Gathas, Vishtaspa is repeatedly (Y. 46. 14, 51. 16, 53. 2) referred to as a kavi, which is etymologically a term for a mantic seer, or poet-priest, and in Yasna 28. 11 is also used of Zoroaster's enemies. In the Younger Avesta the term is also applied to wise men generally, to include Vishtaspa and his ancestors. In tradition however, the kavis are kings, "evidently because Vīštāspa and his forebears, the 'kavis' par excellence, were princely rulers. Presumably the gift of prophecy, of mantic poetry, was hereditary in their family. " Both scripture and tradition refer to Vishtaspa's ancestors but do not mention Vishtaspa's successors; Vishtaspa was apparently the last of his line, and the last of the kavis. In Zoroastrian apocalyptic chronology, the dynasties of the world are divided into seven ages, each named after a metal. According to this chronology (Zand-i Wahman yasn 2. 16, Dabistan 140), Vishtaspa (in Zoroastrian Middle Persian Wishtasp) ascent to the throne ended the reign of silver, and his reign was over the age of gold. In tradition, the works of Zoroaster were said to have been kept in a royal library that was then destroyed by Alexander the Great. In Denkard 3. 420, it is Vishtaspa who is said to have been the king who had those texts made and placed in the royal library.

The Yasht's allusions to conflicts are amplified in the 9th–11th century books of Zoroastrian tradition, where the conflicts are portrayed as outright battles of the faith. So for example the surviving fragments of a fragmentary text that celebrates the deeds of Zairivairi, Vishtaspa's brother and captain of his forces against Arejat.aspa, chief of the Hyonas. According to that text (Ayadgar i Zareran, 10–11), upon hearing of Vishtaspa's conversion, Arejat.aspa sent messengers to demand that Vishtaspa "abandon 'the pure Mazda-worshipping religion which he had received from Ohrmazd', and should become once more 'of the same religion'" as himself. The battle that following Vishtaspa's refusal left Vishtaspa victorious.

The conversion of Vishtaspa is likewise a theme of the 9th–11th century books, and these legends remain the "best known and most current" among Zoroastrians today. According to this tradition, when Zoroaster arrived at Vishtaspa's court, the prophet was "met with hostility from the kayags and karabs (kavis and karapans), with whom he disputed at a great assembly–a tradition which may well be based on reality, for [Vishtaspa] must have had his own priests and seers, who would hardly have welcomed a new prophet claiming divine authority. " The tradition goes on to relate that Zoroaster triumphed after three days of debate, only to be maligned by his enemies to Vishtaspa, who then had the prophet imprisoned. But, from prison, Zoroaster cured one of Vishtaspa's favourite horses (which had suddenly become paralyzed), for which the prophet then gained Vishtaspa's support and admiration. The tale is obliquely referred to in the Anthology of Zadspram (24. 6), which seems to presume that the reader already knows it, and it is summarized in the Denkard (7. 4. 64–86), and – as "workings of popular fancy" – described in detail in the later Book of Zoroaster (942–1094). (Note: "On theological issues, the Book of Zoroaster does not demonstrate significant differences to the older Middle Persian tractates. However, the untypical focus on the figure of Zoroaster on the one hand, and the assimilation of the figure of Zoroaster with the prophetic "type" intrinsic to Mohammed on the other hand, are unmistakable. Without losing its Zoroastrian character, the text portrays Zoroaster as the bearer of the perfect book, as the figure of a prophet in the Islamic sense. The perhaps most obvious example of the Islamization of Zoroaster's functions is in the scene in which, according to the Book of Zoroaster, Zoroaster presents himself to Vishtaspa with 'I am the prophet that God has sent to you' [ZN 281], in which the originally Arabic word rasul – in Islam used for the 'Prophet of God' – is used. ") In the myth, Zoroaster cures each of the horse's four legs in exchange for four concessions: first, that Vishtaspa himself accept Zoroaster's message; secondly, that Vishtaspa's son Spentodata (MP: Esfandiar) do the same; third, that Vishtaspa's wife Hutaosa (MP: Hutos) also convert; (Note: In an alternate tradition based on Yasht 9. 25–26, Hutaosa is said to have been the first to listen to Zoroaster's teachings.) and finally that the men who maligned Zoroaster be put to death. When these four wishes are granted, the horse stands up rejuvenated.Vishtaspa, having accepted the faith from Zoroaster, then asks for four favours in return: first, that he, Vishtaspa, should know his place in the next world; secondly, that he should become invulnerable; third, that he should know the future; and fourth that his body should not leave his soul until the resurrection. Zoroaster replies that these are too great to all be given to one man, and that he should choose one. Vishtaspa agrees, and chooses the first. Zoroaster then gives him consecrated wine to drink, which puts Vishtaspa in a trance in which he has an epiphany; he sees his spirit ascend to heaven where it beholds the glories of God. (Note: In the Book of Zoroaster, Zoroaster performs the dron yasht, a lesser service at which he consecrates wine, milk, incense and a pomegranate. The wine he gives to Vistaspa, who then falls into a dream in which he learns of his soul's ascent to heaven. The remaining three favors are distributed among Vishtaspa's son Peshotanu (MP: Peshotan), who becomes undying by drinking the milk: Vishtaspa's minister Jamasp, who gains all knowledge by inhaling the incense; and Spentodata, who attains invincibility by eating the pomegranate.) Vishtaspa's conversion is traditionally said to have taken place during Zoroaster's forty-second year, "a figure undoubtedly reached by later calculation".

In medieval Zoroastrian chronology, Vishtaspa is identified as a grandfather of "Ardashir", i.e. the 5th century BCE Artaxerxes I (or II). This myth is tied to the Sassanid (early 3rd–early 7th century) claim of descent from Artaxerxes, and the claim of relationship to the Kayanids, that is, with Vishtaspa and his ancestors. The full adoption of Kayanid names, titles and myths from the Avesta by the Sassanids was a "main component of [Sassanid] ideology. " The association of Artaxerxes with the Kayanids occurred through the identification of Artaxerxes II's title ('Mnemon' in Greek) with the name of Vishtaspa's legendary grandson and successor, Wahman: both are theophorics of Avestan Vohu Manah "Good Mind(ed)"; Middle Persian 'Wahman' is a contraction of the Avestan name, while Greek 'Mnemon' is a calque of it. The Sassanid association of their dynasty with Vishtaspa's is a development dated to the end of the 4th century, and which "arose to some extent because this was when the Sasanians conquered Balkh, the birthplace of Vishtasp and the 'holy land' of Zoroastrianism. " (Note: In "a legend [that] persisted down to Sasanian times and beyond, [...] both Zoroaster and his patron Vishtaspa [were associated] with the Bactrian capital of Balkh", Bactria was not the only region that claimed Vishtaspa for its own; as recorded in post-Sassanid sources (but apparently older), at least four other Iranian provinces – Parthia, Drangiana (Sistan), Atropatene and Persia – also attributed events in their local history to Vishtaspa.)

As was also the case for the fourth century Roman identification of Zoroaster's patron with the late-6th century BCE father of Darius I (see below) – the identification of Vishtaspa as a grandfather of "Ardashir" (Artaxerxes I/II) was once perceived to substantiate the "traditional date" of Zoroaster, which places the prophet in the 6th century BCE. The traditional descriptions of Vishtaspa's ancestors as having chariots (a description that puts them fully in the Bronze Age) also contribute to the academic debate on the dating of Zoroaster; for a summary of the role of Vishtaspa's ancestors in this issue, see Boyce 1984, p. 62, n. 38. (Note: Additionally, and within the framework of the arguments that Cyrus the Great was a Zoroastrian, Boyce 1982, pp. 68–69 speculates that the reason why "[Cyrus'] name is never mentioned in the Pahlavi books or in the later royal genealogies" was because tradition identified Cyrus with Vishtaspa, with the use of Vishtaspa's name instead of Cyrus', thus leading to "complete oblivion for Cyrus in Zoroastrian tradition".)

=== In the Sistan heroic cycle ===
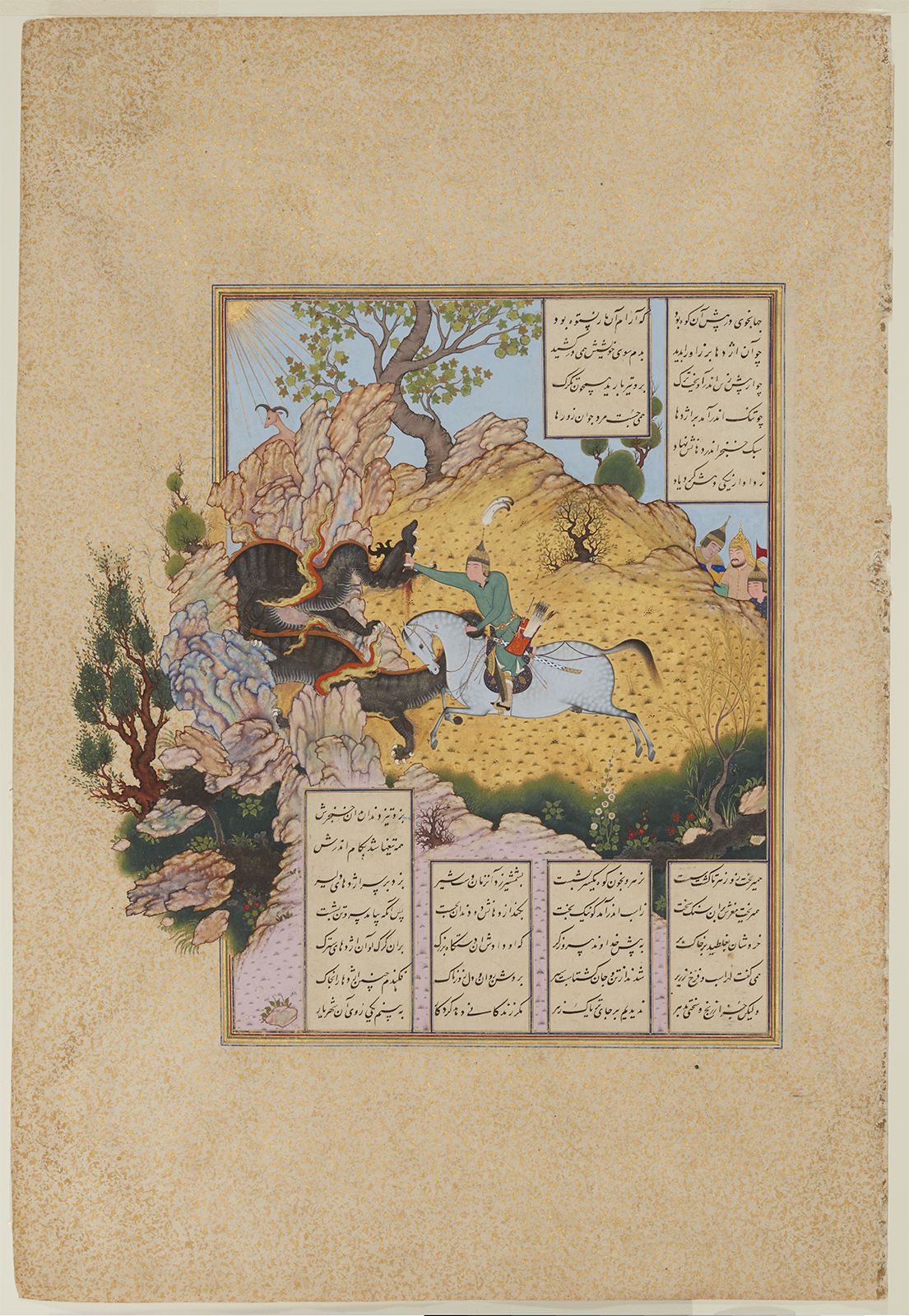
Gushtasp Slays the Dragon of Mount Saqila. Miniature by Mirza Ali from the Shahnameh of Shah Tahmasp. Tabriz, c. 1530-1535 Aga Khan Museum

Non-Zoroastrian literature in New Persian and Arabic uniformly reflects the regular development of Middle Persian wi- into gu-, with Middle Persian Wishtasp thus becoming Goshtasb in Sistan national history (Tarikh-e Sistan), Goshtasp in Firdausi's Book of Kings (Shahnameh), Goshtasf in the Mojmal al-tawarikh, Beshtashb by Al-Tabari.

In several respects, for instance in Goshtasb's/Goshtasf's (etc.) mythological genealogy, the Sistan cycle texts continue the Zoroastrian tradition. So, for example, Goshtasp is identified as a member of the Kayanian dynasty, is the son of Lohrasp/Lohrasb (etc.), is the brother of Zareh/Zarer (etc.), is the father of Esfandiar/Isfandiar (etc.) and Bashutan/Beshotan (etc.), and so on. However, in the Sistan legends, Goshtasb/Goshtasf (etc.) is an abominable figure, altogether unlike the hero of Zoroastrian tradition. The reason for this discrepancy is unknown. According to the Sistan tradition, Goshtasb demands the throne from his father Lohrasp, but storms off to India ("Hind") when the king declines. Goshtasb's brother Zareh (Zareh/Zarer etc., Avestan Zairivairi) is sent to fetch him, but Goshtasb flees to "Rome" where he marries Katayoun (Katayun/Katayoun etc.), the daughter of the 'qaysar'. Goshtasb subsequently becomes a military commander for the Roman emperor, and encourages the emperor to demand tribute from Iran. Again Zareh is sent to fetch Goshtasb, who is then promised the throne, and is thus persuaded to return.

Back in Sistan, Goshtasb imprisons his own son Esfandiar (Esfandiar/Isfandiar etc., Avestan Spentodata), but then has to seek Esfandiar's help in defeating Arjasp (Avestan Aurvataspa) who is threatening Balkh. Goshtasb promises Esfandiar the throne in return for his help, but when Esfandiar is successful, his father stalls and instead sends him off on another mission to suppress a rebellion in Turan. Esfandiar is again successful, and upon his return Goshtasb hedges once again and – aware of a prediction that foretells the death of Esfandiar at the hand of Rostam – sends him off on a mission in which Esfandiar is destined to die. In the Shahnameh, the nobles upbraid Goshtasb as a disgrace to the throne; his daughters denounce him as a heinous criminal; and his younger son Bashutan (Avestan Peshotanu) condemns him as a wanton destroyer of Iran.

As in Zoroastrian tradition, in the Sistan cycle texts Goshtasp is succeeded by Esfandiar's son, Bahman (< MP Wahman). The identification of Bahman with 'Ardashir' (see above) reappears in the Sistan cycle texts as well.

== In Greek and Roman thought ==
The name "Vishtaspa" is "Hystaspes" in the Greek and Latin texts of the Hellenistic era. Besides referring to historically attested persons named Vishtaspa, it was also applied to Zoroaster's patron, who the Greeks and Romans imagined to be a sage of great antiquity, and the putative author of a set of prophecies written under his name. (Note: For the primary sources, see Bidez & Cumont 1938, vol. I: pp. 215–223; vol. II: pp. 359–377.) Although the works attributed to Pseudo-Hystaspes draw on real Zoroastrian sources, the Greek and Roman portraits of his person are just as fanciful as those of the other two les Mages hellénisés, Pseudo-Zoroaster and Pseudo-Ostanes. While Pseudo-Zoroaster was identified as the "inventor" of astrology, and Pseudo-Ostanes was imagined to be a master sorcerer, Pseudo-Hystaspes seems to have been stereotyped as an apocalyptic prophet.

None of the works attributed to him are still extant, but quotations and references have survived in the works of others, especially in those of two early Christian writers – Justin Martyr (ca. 100-165 CE) in Samaria and the mid-3rd century Lactantius in North Africa – who drew on them by way of confirmation that what themselves held to be revealed truth had already been uttered. Only one of these pseudepigraphic works – referred to as the Book of Hystaspes or the Oracles of Hystaspes or just Hystaspes – is known by name. This work (or set of works) of the first century BCE is referred to by Lactantius, Justin Martyr, Clement of Alexandria, Lydus, and Aristokritos, all of whom describe it as foretelling the downfall of the Roman Empire, the return of rule to the east, and of the coming of the saviour.

Lactantius provides a detailed summary of the Oracles of Hystaspes in his Divinae Institutiones (Book VII, from the end of chapter 15 through chapter 19). It begins with Hystaspes awaking from a dream, and needing to have it interpreted for him. This is duly accomplished by a young boy, "here representing, according to convention, the openness of youth and innocent to divine visitations. " As interpreted by the boy, the dream "predicts" the iniquity of the last age, and the impending destruction of the wicked by fire. The divine fire will burn both the righteous and the wicked, but only the wicked will be hurt and neither will be destroyed. During the eschatological inferno, the "followers of truth" will separate themselves from the wicked and ascend a mountain. The evil king who dominates the world will be angered on hearing this, and he will resolve to encircle the mountain with his army. The righteous implore to "Jupiter", who sends them a saviour, who will descend from heaven accompanied by angels and before him a flaming sword. Hystaspes "prophesies" that the wicked king (i.e. the Roman emperor) will survive the destruction of his armies, but will lose power. It was "presumably" the prophecy of the destruction of a victorious power (i.e. the Roman Empire) that caused the work to be proscribed by Rome; according to Justin Martyr (Apologia, I. 44. 12), reading the work was punishable by death.

Unlike the works attributed to the other two les Mages hellénisés, the Oracles of Hystaspes was apparently based on the genuine Zoroastrian myths, and "the argument for ultimate magian composition is a strong one. [...] As prophecies they have a political context, a function, and a focus which radically distinguish them from the philosophical and encyclopedic wisdom of the other pseudepigrapha. " Although "[p]rophecies of woes and iniquities in the last age are alien to orthodox Zoroastrianism", there was probably a growth of Zoroastrian literature in the late fourth-early third centuries denouncing the evils of the Hellenistic age, and offering hope of the coming kingdom of Ahura Mazda.

The Greco-Roman obsession with Zoroaster as the "inventor" of astrology also influenced the image of Hystaspes. So for example in Lydus' On the months (de Mensibus II. 4), which credits "the Chaldeans in the circle of Zoroaster and Hystaspes and the Egyptians" for the creation of the seven-day week after the number of planets.

The fourth century Ammianus Marcellinus (xxiii. 6. 32) identifies Zoroaster's patron with another Vishtaspa, better known as Hystaspes in English, the (late-6th century BCE) father of Darius I. The sixth century Agathias was more ambivalent, observing that it wasn't clear to him whether the name of Zoroaster's patron referred to the father of Darius or to another Hystaspes (ii. 24). As with the medieval Zoroastrian chronology that identifies Vishtaspa with "Ardashir" (see above), Ammianus' identification was once considered to substantiate the "traditional date" of Zoroaster.

== Sources ==
- Christensen, Arthur (1931), Les Kayanides, Copenhagen: AF Høst & Søn.
- Beck, Roger (1991), "Thus Spake Not Zarathushtra: Zoroastrian Pseudepigrapha of the Greco-Roman World", in Boyce, Mary; Grenet, Frantz (eds.), A History of Zoroastrianism, vol. 3, Leiden: Brill, pp. 491–565.
- Bidez, Joseph; Cumont, Franz (1938), Les Mages Hellénisés, Le Muséon 512, Paris: Société d'Éditions Les Belles Lettres.
- Boyce, Mary (1975), History of Zoroastrianism, vol. 1, Leiden: Brill.
- Boyce, Mary (1982), History of Zoroastrianism, vol. 2, Leiden: Brill.
- Boyce, Mary (1984), "On the Antiquity of Zoroastrian Apocalyptic", Bulletin of the School of Oriental and African Studies, 47 (1): 57–75, doi:10.1017/S0041977X0002214X, S2CID 170804351.
- Boyce, Mary; Grenet, Frantz (1991), History of Zoroastrianism, vol. 3, Leiden: Brill.
- Boyce, Mary (1992), Zoroastrianism: Its Antiquity and Constant Vigour, Costa Mesa: Mazda Press.
- Daryaee, Touraj (1995), "National History or Keyanid History?: The Nature of Sasanid Zoroastrian Historiography", Iranian Studies, 28 (3/4): 129–141, doi:10.1080/00210869508701832.
- Hinnels, John R. (1973), "The Zoroastrian Doctrine of Salvation in the Roman World: A Study of the Oracles of Hystaspes", in Sharpe, Eric John; Hinnels, John R. (eds.), Man and His Salvation, Manchester: Manchester UP, pp. 125–148.
- Kent, Roland G. (1945), "The Name of Hystaspes", Language, 21 (2): 55–58, doi:10.2307/409718, JSTOR 409718.
- Lukonin, V. G. (1983), "Political, Social and Administrative Institutions", in Yarshater, Ehsan (ed.), Cambridge History of Iran, vol. 3(2): The Seleucid, Parthian and Sasanian Periods, London: Cambridge UP, pp. 681–747
- Mayrhofer, Manfred, ed. (1977), "Vištāspa", Die avestischen Namen, Iranisches Personennamenbuch, vol. I(1), Vienna: Verlag der Österreichischen Akademie der Wissenschaften, n. 379, p. 97.
- Russell, James R. (1993), "On Mysticism and Esotericism among the Zoroastrians", Iranian Studies, 26 (2): 73–94, doi:10.1080/00210869308701787.
- Shabazi, A. Shapur (2003), "Goštāsp", Encyclopedia Iranica, vol. 11, Costa Mesa: University of California Press, pp. 171–176.
- Skjaervo, Prods Oktor (2013), Kauui Vištāspa, Kay Wištāsp, Kay Beštāsb/Goštāsb, Encyclopædia Iranica
- Stausberg, Michael (2002), Die Religion Zarathushtras, vol. I, Stuttgart: Kohlhammer.
- Williams Jackson, A. V. (1893), "Where Was Zoroaster's Native Place?", Journal of the American Oriental Society, 15: 221–232, doi:10.2307/592356, JSTOR 592356.
- Williams Jackson, A. V. (1899), Zoroaster, the prophet of ancient Iran, New York: Columbia UP

Preceded by Kay Lohrasp	Legendary Kings of the Shāhnāma; 120 years (2871–2991 after Keyumars)	Succeeded by Kay Bahman
