= Hystaspes =

Vishtaspa (Avestan: 𐬬𐬌𐬱𐬙𐬁𐬯𐬞𐬀 Vištāspa; Old Persian: 𐎻𐏁𐎫𐎠𐎿𐎱, Vištāspa), hellenized as Hystáspes (Ὑστάσπης, Hustáspēs), may refer to:

- Vishtaspa (fl. between 10th and 6th century BCE, if historical), the first patron of Zoroaster
- Hystaspes (father of Darius I) (fl. 550 BCE), satrap of Bactria and possibly also of Fārs, and father of Darius the Great
- Hystaspes (son of Darius I) (fl. c. 480 BCE), son of Darius the Great
- Hystaspes (son of Xerxes I) (fl. c. 460 BCE), son of Xerxes I of Persia
- Hystaspes (fl. 4th-century BCE), obscure relative of Darius III, married to the anonymous granddaugher of Artaxerxes III (and possible daughter of Bisthanes) mentioned in the Histories of Alexander the Great of historian Quintus Curtius Rufus
- Hystaspes, the older brother of the legendary king Zariadres of the North Caucasus
