= Artaxerxes =

Artaxerxes /ˌɑːrtəˈzɜːrksiːz/ may refer to:

The throne name of several Achaemenid rulers of the 1st Persian Empire:

- Artaxerxes I (died 425 BC), Artaxerxes I Longimanus, r. 466–425 BC, son and successor of Xerxes I
- Artaxerxes II (436 BC–358 BC), Artaxerxes II Mnemon, r. 404–358 BC, son and successor of Darius II
- Artaxerxes III (425 BC–338 BC), Artaxerxes III Ochus, r. 358–338 BC, son and successor of Artaxerxes II
- Artaxerxes IV (died 336 BC), Artaxerxes IV Arses, r. 338–336 BC, son and successor of Artaxerxes III
- Artaxerxes V (died 329 BC), Artaxerxes V Bessus, r. 330–329 BC, nobleman who seized the throne from Darius III

Artaxerxes may also refer to:

- Ardeshir (disambiguation), the Middle and Modern Persian name descended from Old Persian equivalent of Artaxerxes, Artaxšacā
- Artaxerxes (opera), a 1762 opera by Thomas Arne
- 7212 Artaxerxes, a main-belt asteroid
- The wizard Artaxerxes, a character in J.R.R. Tolkien's novella "Roverandom"

== See also ==
- Asha
- Artaxias (disambiguation)
- Artaserse
