= Ardeshir =

Ardeshir, Ardashir or Ardasher may refer to:

== Throne name of several rulers ==
- Artaxerxes (disambiguation), the Hellenized form of Ardeshir
- Ardashir Orontid, r. 5th century BC, Armenian king from the Orontid dynasty
- Ardashir I (180–242), r. 224–242, founder of the Sassanid Empire
- Ardashir II (died 383), r. 379–383, son of Hormizd II and successor of Shapur II "the Great"
- Ardashir III (621–630), r. 628–630, the youngest of the Sassanid kings
- Ardashir I Kushanshah (died 245), ruler of the Kushano-Sasanian Kingdom from 233 to 245
- Ardashir I (Bavandid ruler) (Ardashir I of Mazandaran, died 1205), r. 1173–1205, ruler of the Bavand dynasty
- Ardashir II (Bavandid ruler) (Ardashir II of Mazandaran, died 1249), r. 1238–1249, ruler of the Bavand dynasty

== Given name ==
- Ardaseer Cursetjee (1808–1877), the first Indian elected a Fellow of the Royal Society
- Ardeshir Cowasjee (1926–2012), Pakistani journalist
- Ardeshir Dalal (1884–1949), Indian civil servant and businessman
- Ardeshir Farah, Iranian-British musician and guitarist
- Ardeshir Godrej (1868–1936), Indian inventor and engineer
- Ardeshir Hosseinpour (1962–2007), Iranian scientist
- Ardeshir Irani (1886–1969), Indian screenwriter and director
- Ardeshir Kamkar (born 1962), Iranian musician
- Ardeshir Kazemi (born 1938), Iranian actor
- Ardeshir Mahdavi, Iranian-Austrian architect
- Ardeshir Mohasses (1938–2008), Iranian illustrator
- Ardeshir Ovanessian (1905–1990), Iranian communist leader
- Ardeshir Pashang (born 1979), Kurdish-Iranian politician
- Ardeshir Reporter (1865–1932), Parsi spy
- Ardeshir Darabshaw Shroff (1899–1965), Indian industrialist, banker, and economist
- Ardeshir Furdorji Sohrabji (1897–1990), Indian cricket commentator
- Ardeshir Tarapore (1923–1965), Indian soldier, Param vir chakra recipient
- Ardashir Vakil (born 1962), British-Indian author
- Ardeshir Ruttonji Wadia (1888–1971), Indian author and politician
- Ardeshir Zahedi (1928–2021), Iranian diplomat

== Places ==
- Ardasir oil field, near Kharg Island, Iran
- Ardeshir, Iran, a village in East Azerbaijan Province
- Mons Ardeshir, a mountain on the Moon
