= Avestan phonology =

Sounds used in an Iranian language

This article deals with the phonology of Avestan. Avestan is one of the Iranian languages and retained archaic voiced alveolar fricatives. It also has fricatives rather than the aspirated series seen in the closely related Indo-Aryan languages.

== Consonants ==
| | | Labial | Dental | Alveolar | Post- alveolar | Retroflex | Palatal | Velar | | Glottal |
| | | Labial | Dental | Alveolar | Post- alveolar | Retroflex | Palatal | plain | labial | Glottal |
|---|---|---|---|---|---|---|---|---|---|---|
| Nasal | | m /m/ | n /n/ | | | | ń /ɲ/ | ŋ /ŋ/ | ŋʷ /ŋʷ/ | |
| Plosive | voiceless | p /p/ | t /t/ | | č /tʃ/ | | | k /k/ | | |
| Plosive | voiced | b /b/ | d /d/ | | ǰ /dʒ/ | | | g /ɡ/ | | |
| Fricative | voiceless | f /f/ | θ /θ/ | s /s/ | š /ʃ/ | ṣ̌ /ʂ/ | š́ /ɕ/ | x /x/ | xʷ /xʷ/ | h /h/ |
| Fricative | voiced | β /β/ | δ /ð/ | z /z/ | ž /ʒ/ | | | γ /ɣ/ | | |
| Approximant | | | | | | | y /j/ | | v /w/ | |
| Trill | | | r /r/ | | | | | | | |

According to Beekes, [ð] and [ɣ] are allophones of /θ/ and /x/ respectively(in Old Avestan).

=== ṣ̌ versus rt ===
Avestan ṣ̌ continues Indo-Iranian *-rt-. Its phonetic value and its phonological status (one or two phonemes) are somewhat unclear. The conditions under which change from -rt- to -ṣ̌- occurs are fundamentally ill-defined, though it is likely to occur if the preceding vowel is accented. Thus, for example, Gathic/Younger ərəta/arəta ('establish') is a variant of aṣ̌a but is consistently written with r t/. Similarly, arəti ('portion') and aši ('recompense'). But aməṣ̌a ('immortal') is consistently written with ṣ̌, while marəta ('mortal') is consistently written with r t. In some instances, a change is evident in only Younger Avestan. For example, the Gathic Avestan word for "bridge" is pərətūm, while in Younger Avestan it is pəṣ̌ūm. Both are singular accusative forms, but when the word is singular nominative, the Younger Avestan variant is again (and all but once) with r t.

Benveniste suggested ṣ̌ was only a convenient way of writing /rt/ and should not be considered phonetically relevant. According to Gray, ṣ̌ is a misreading, representing /r r/, of uncertain phonetic value but "probably" representing a voiceless r.

Miller follows the older suggestion that Avestan ṣ̌ represents a phoneme of its own, for which he introduces the symbol "/Ř/" and identifies phonetically as [r̝̥] (the voiceless allophone of Czech ř). He goes on to suggest that in writing, -rt- was restored when a scribe was aware of a morpheme boundary between the /r/ and /t/.

=== Consonants history ===
Table
| Proto-Indo-European | Proto-Iranian | Avestan | | Conditions |
| Proto-Indo-European | Proto-Iranian | Older | Younger | Conditions |
PIE labials
| *p | *p | p | | |
| *p | *p | f | | before consonants except t (but not tr) |
| *pH | *f | f | | |
| *b, *bʰ | *b | b | b | |
| *b, *bʰ | *b | b | β, uu | word-internally except after nasals and sibilants |
PIE coronals
| *d, *dʰ | *z (before *d) | z | | |
| *d, *dʰ | *d | d | d | |
| *t | *d (after voiced aspirated consonants) | d | δ | word-internally except after nasals or sibilants |
| *t | *s (before *t) | s | | |
| *t | t | t | | |
| *t | t | θ | | before consonants |
| *tH | *θ | θ | | |
PIE dorsals
| *k, *kʷ | *č (before *e, *i) | c | | before PIE *e, *i |
| *k, *kʷ | *k | k | | |
| *k, *kʷ | *k | x | | before consonants |
| *kH | *x | x | | |
| *ḱ | *c | s | | |
| *g, *gʷ, *gʰ, *gʰʷ | *ǰ (before *e, *i) | j | j | |
| *g, *gʷ, *gʰ, *gʰʷ | *ǰ (before *e, *i) | j | ž | word-internally except after nasals and sibilants |
| *g, *gʷ, *gʰ, *gʰʷ | *g | g | g | |
| *g, *gʷ, *gʰ, *gʰʷ | *g | g | ɣ | word-internally except after nasals and sibilants |
| *g, *gʷ, *gʰ, *gʰʷ | *g | g | ∅ | word-internally before u or uu |
| *ǵ, *ǵʰ | *j | *z | | |
PIE sibilants
| *s | *ž (after aspirated dorsals; or r, semivowels, high vowels + before voiced obstruents) | ž | | |
| *s | *š (after dorsals, *r, semivowels, and high vowels) | š | | |
| *s | *s (before voiceless stops and *n) | s | | |
| *s | *h | h | | |
| *s | *h | ŋh | | in the sequence -ā̆hā̆- |

== Vowels ==
| | Front | | Central | | Back | |
| | short | long | short | long | short | long |
|---|---|---|---|---|---|---|
| Close | i /i/ | ī /iː/ | | | u /u/ | ū /uː/ |
| Mid | e /e/ | ē /eː/ | ə /ə/ | ə̄ /əː/ | o /o/ | ō /oː/ |
| Open | | | a /a/ | ā /aː/ | | å /ɒː/ |
| Nasal | | | ą /ã/ | | | |

== Transcription ==
There are various conventions for transliteration of the Avestan alphabet. We adopt the following one here. Vowels:

a ā ə ə̄ e ē o ō å ą i ī u ū

Consonants:

k g γ x xʷ č ǰ t d δ θ t̰ p b β f
ŋ ŋʷ ṇ ń n m y w r s z š ṣ̌ ž h

The glides y and w are often transcribed as ii and uu, imitating Avestan orthography. The letter transcribed t̰ indicates an allophone of /t/ with no audible release at the end of a word and before certain obstruents.

== Bibliography ==
- Gray, Louis H. (1941), "On Avesta Š = ÁRT, Ṛ́T, ŌI = AI, and Å̄ = Ā(H)", Journal of the American Oriental Society, 61 (2): 101–104, doi:10.2307/594254, JSTOR 594254
- Miller, Gary D. (1968), "rt-Clusters in Avestan", Language, 44 (2.1): 274–283, doi:10.2307/411623, JSTOR 411623
- de Vaan, Michiel (2014), Introduction to Avestan (Brill Introductions to Indo-European Languages, Band 1), Brill, ISBN 978-90-04-25809-9.
