= Kangdez =

Fortress in Iranian myths

Kangdez (literally "Fortress of Kang") is a legendary fortress in Iranian mythology, which resembles paradise.

== Sources ==
- Lurje, Pavel (2010). "Kangdez". In Yarshater, Ehsan (ed.). Encyclopædia Iranica. Vol. XV/5: Ḵamsa of Jamāli–Karim Devona. London and New York: Routledge & Kegan Paul. pp. 498–499. ISBN 978-1-934283-28-8.
