= Zareh =

Male given name

Zareh (Armenian: Զարեհ) is an Armenian masculine given name, derived from a legendary king mentioned in chapter 1.31 of Movses Khorenatsi's History of Armenia. The name is of Iranian origin. It was in use among Armenians from the second century BCE to the fourth century CE, after which it fell out of use. It was revived in the nineteenth century and is now a common male name.

== Given name ==
- Zareh I (1915–1963), Armenian Catholic patriarch of Cilicia and religious figure
- Zareh Baronian (1941–2017), Armenian-Romanian theologian and abbot
- Zareh Kalfayan (1887–1939), Ottoman painter of Armenian descent
- Zareh Moskofian (1898–1987), Ottoman painter of Armenian descent
- Zareh Mutafian (1907–1980), French painter of Armenian descent
- Zareh Nubar (1883–1963), Armenian philanthropist
- Zareh Sinanyan (born 1973), Armenian-American politician
- Zareh Vorpuni (1902–1980), Armenian writer, novelist and editor
- Zareh Yaldizciyan (1924–2007, pen name Zahrad), Armenian Turkish poet

== Surname ==
- Leila Zare (born 1980), Iranian actress
- Mohammad Hashim Zare (born 1953), Afghan politician and governor
