= Ardeshir Mahdavi =

Austrian architect

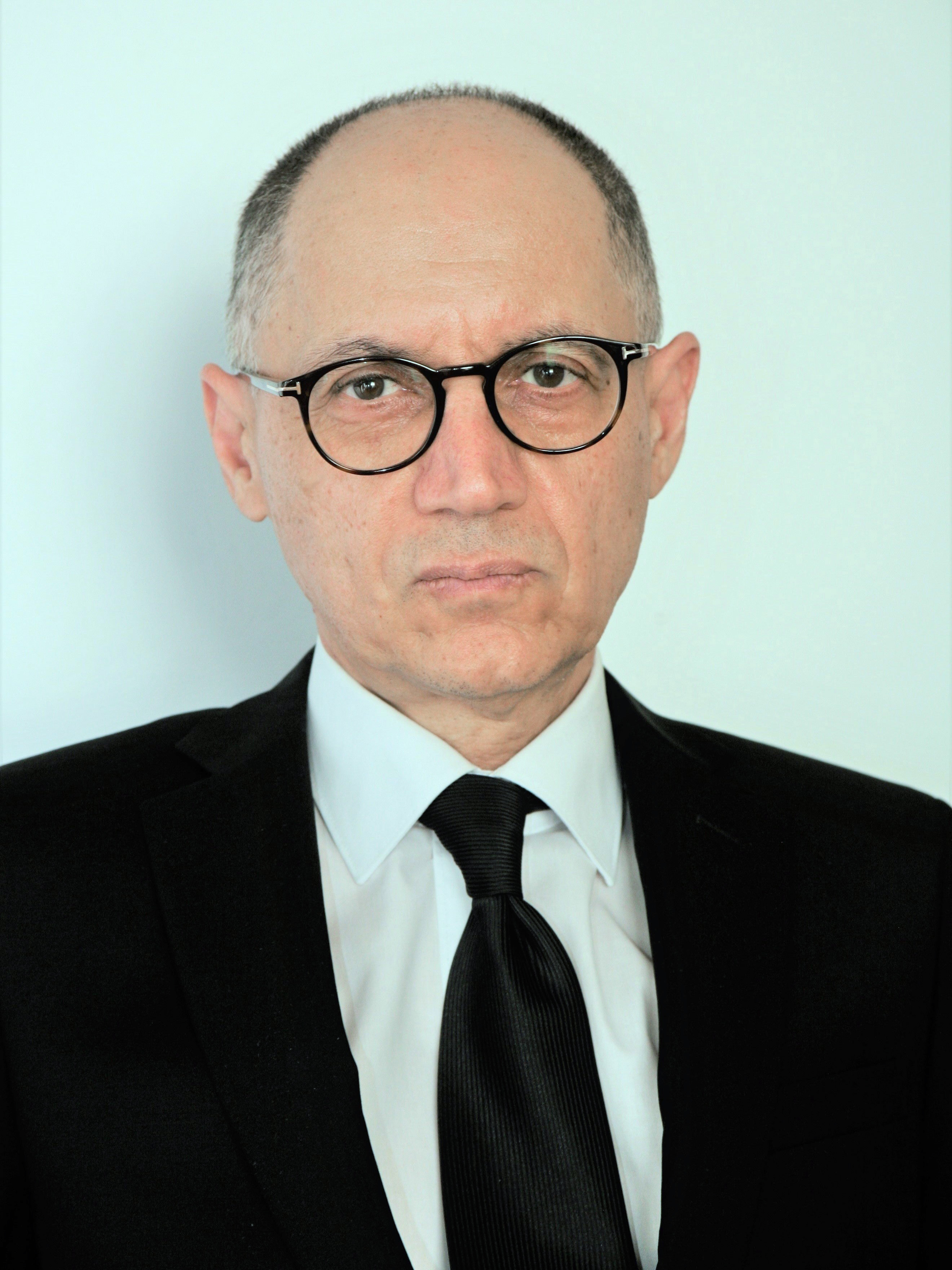
Ardeshir Mahdavi

Ardeshir Mahdavi is an expert in building physics, architectural science, and human ecology.

== Education ==
Ardeshir Mahdavi has a Diplom-Ingenieur degree, a Ph.D., and a Post-Doc (Habilitation) degree from TU Wien, Austria.

== Academic positions ==
Prior to his current affiliation at TU Graz, Professor Mahdavi was the Director of the Department of Building Physics and Building Ecology and the Chair of Graduate Studies in Building Science and Technology at TU Wien. He acted also as the Chair of the Institute of Architectural Sciences at TU Wien. Before returning to Austria, Professor Mahdavi was a Full Tenured Professor of Building Physics at Carnegie Mellon University (CMU), Pittsburgh, USA. He has supervised more than 65 Ph.D. students and more than 180 Master of Science students.

== Research ==
Mahdavi has conducted scientific research in multiple fields, including building engineering physics (thermal, visual, and acoustical performance of built environments, energy-efficient building design and operation), Building Performance Simulation, Building Controls and Diagnostics, Building Ecology, and Human Ecology.

Specific scientific contributions of Mahdavi include the development of a comprehensive ontology for monitored building data, the conception and implementation of an exclusively simulation-powered predictive building systems control methodology, analysis and modeling of the urban microclimate, including the urban heat island phenomena, development and evaluation of sky radiance and luminance distribution models, work on probabilistic room acoustics modes and the development and evaluations of models of building users' presence and behavior in buildings.

Mahdavi tends to work on multiple research questions simultaneously. One essential line of inquiry he has pursued over the last 15 years addresses the inadequacy of models of buildings’ inhabitants, their presence, their requirements, their perception and evaluation processes, and their behavior and actions. Another area of concentration concerns the challenges of modelling the urban microclimate and urban-level energy transfer processes. He has been also working on the ontological aspects of building modelling.

== Teaching ==
Mahdavi has thought introductory and advanced courses in building physics and building ecology, as well as scientific research methods. He has acted as a Visiting Professor at academic Institutes around the world. The topics of a number of his recently taught courses include:

- An introduction to Building Physics
- Space, sound, music, etc.
- Fundamentals of Building Ecology
- Research methods and design
- An introduction to the philosophy of science

Regarding his teaching and academic supervision philosophy, Mahdavi suggested in a recent interview:

Our students, as future scientists, engineers and designers will have to deal with multiple critical and complex challenges, involving environment, technology, human factors and economic constraints, as well as demographic and political developments. Needless to say, deep understanding of building physics and expertise in computational methods represents the indispensable core requirement in the education of our students in the building performance simulation domain. But intelligent and productive deployment of the rich potential of computational modeling requires, in my view, much more. If I had to identify a single most important message, it would be the capacity for independent, systemic and critical reasoning.

— Ardeshir Mahdavi, IBPSANews-27-2

== Current and past personal affiliations ==
Mahdavi is a fellow of International Building Performance Simulation Association (IBPSA). In the past, he has acted as a member of ASHRAE (American Society of Heating, Refrigerating and Air Conditioning Engineers, Inc.), IESNA (Illuminating Engineering Society of North America), CIB (Conseil International Du Batiment Pour La Recherch L'Etude Et La Documentation), ÖNORM (Austrian Institute for Standardization), and SHE (The North-America Society for Human Ecology).

== Awards ==
Ardeshir Mahdavi is the recipient of the IBPSA Distinguished Achievement Award. Moreover, he received the "Der Baupreis 2006" and "Der Baupreis 2005" awards in the research category. Mahdavi is also the recipient of the "Henry Hornbostel Teaching Award" of the College of Fine Arts, Carnegie Mellon University.

== Publication and presentation activities ==
Ardeshir Mahdavi is the author or co-author of over 250 journal papers as well as over 650 conference papers. He is also a frequent Keynote speaker at different international conferences such as IBPSA, CLIMA, PLEA, CIB, BAUSIM, BSA, CAAD Futures, eCAADe and ECPPM.
