= Katayun Virkar =

Indian scientist

- Katayun Virkar, from a 1976 publication
- Born: 4 August 1918; Bombay, British India
- Died: 28 July 2011 (aged 92); India
- Occupation(s): Medical researcher, physician

Katayun Dattatraya Virkar (4 August 1918 – 28 July 2011) was an Indian physician and medical researcher, head of the contraception division at India's National Institute of Research on Reproductive Health (NIRRH).

== Early life ==
Virkar was born in Bombay (now Mumbai). She earned a medical degree at the University of Mumbai in 1946. She held a Technical Assistance Fellowship from the Population Council, to study obstetrics and gynaecology at the University of Michigan Medical Center in the United States in 1964.

== Career ==
Virkar's early career included hospital positions in Surat and Pune. She was a reproductive physiology researcher at the Indian Cancer Research Center. Virkar's research concerned the physiological effects of contraceptive methods, including intrauterine devices and hormonal contraceptives in pill, implant, and injection forms. She was head of the contraception division at the National Institute for Research on Reproductive Health (NIRRH) in Mumbai, and active in the Family Planning Association of India (FPAI). In the 1980s she did research for the World Health Organization's Task Force on Oral Contraceptives.

Virkar's research was published in international scholarly journals, including Contraception,Fertility and Sterility, Journal of Obstetrics and Gynaecology of India, Indian Journal of Medical Research, Journal of Reproduction and Fertility, Journal of Family Welfare, and American Journal of Obstetrics and Gynecology.

Virkar was a member of the council of the Indian Academy of Cytologists, and presented the academy's 1979 oration, on the subject "Review of Vaginocervical Cytology with Exogenous Estrogens and Progestins". She held memberships in the Bombay Obstetrics and Gynaecology Society, the Fertility and Sterility Association, the All-India Medical Women's Association, and Friends of Trees.

== Publications ==
- "Effect of a Plastic Intrauterine Device upon Implantation in the Rabbit" (1966, with William J. Ledger and L. A. Irvin)
- "Socio-economic study of women attending an urban clinic and their attitude towards oral contraceptives" (1966, with M. R. Kirtikar)
- "Liver function tests in women using oral contraceptives" (1967, with A. R. Sheth, M. A. Adarkar, S. S. Rao, and S. Kora)
- "Experience with oral contraceptives" (1968)
- "Cytological studies of smears from removed loops" (1968, with S. D. Kelkar)
- "Effect of steroidal contraceptives on antibody formation in the human female" (1971, with Usha M. Joshi, Shanta S. Rao, Shaila J. Kora, Suhasini S. Dikshit)
- "Long-acting injectable therapy for fertility control" (1971, with S. J. Kora, S. S. Dikshit, and M. J. Lodaya)
- "The effect of oral contraceptives on concentrations of various components of human milk" (1973, with Villi M. Barsivala)
- "Thyroid functions of women taking oral contraceptives" (1974, with Villi M. Barsivala and Ramesh D. Kulkarni)
- "Short-term effect of ovral and norgestrel on the vitamin B6 and B1 status of women" (1975, with Usha M. Joshi, Anurupa Lahiri, Shaila Kora, and Suhasini Dikshit)
- "The effect of combination and low dose progestogen oral contraceptives on serum lipids" (1975, with Uday M. Donde)
- "Carbohydrate metabolism of Indian women taking steroid contraceptives" (1976, with Villi M. Barsivala and R. D. Kulkani)
- "Cytological follow-up of 200 women using copper device for contraception" (1976, with M. Z. Affandi)
- "Effect of contraceptive steroids on human lactation" (1977, with Willi S. Toddywalla and Lata Joshi)
- "Effect of an Ayurvedic preparation on peripheral parameters of the menstrual cycle" (1977, with J. Joshi and P. K. Devi)
- "A comparative study of loop smears and copper device smears" (1979, with K. Gopalkrishnan)

== Personal life ==
Virkar was married to a fellow doctor, and had two sons, Jeevan and Prakash. She died in 2011, in India, at the age of 92.
