= Artashes Baghdasaryan =

Armenian football defender

Personal information
- Full name: Artashes Baghdasaryan
- Date of birth: 11 February 1984 (age 42)
- Place of birth: Yerevan, Soviet Union
- Height: 1.83 m (6 ft 0 in)
- Position: Right back

Team information
- Current team: Impuls Dilijan

Senior career*
Years	Team	Apps	(Gls)
2003–2004	Kotayk Abovyan	9	(0)
2004–2006	Kilikia Yerevan	49	(1)
2006–2007	Austria Kärnten	2	(0)
2007–2008	Kilikia Yerevan	9	(0)
2008	Ulisses	8	(1)
2010 –	Impuls Dilijan	0	(0)

International career^{‡}
2004–2006	Armenia U-21	5	(0)
2006	Armenia	1	(0)
- * Club domestic league appearances and goals as of 1 January 2009 ‡ National team caps and goals as of 15 July 2008

Artashes Baghdasaryan (Armenian: Արտաշես Բաղդասարյան; born 11 February 1984, in Yerevan, Armenia) is an Armenian football defender, currently with Armenian Premier League club Impuls FC Dilijan. He is also a member of the Armenia national football team, and has 1 cap since his debut in 2006. Playing for Austria Kärnten, he was injured and soon moved to Armenia. He currently plays for Ulisses.
