= Kay Lohrasp =

Character in the Shahnameh

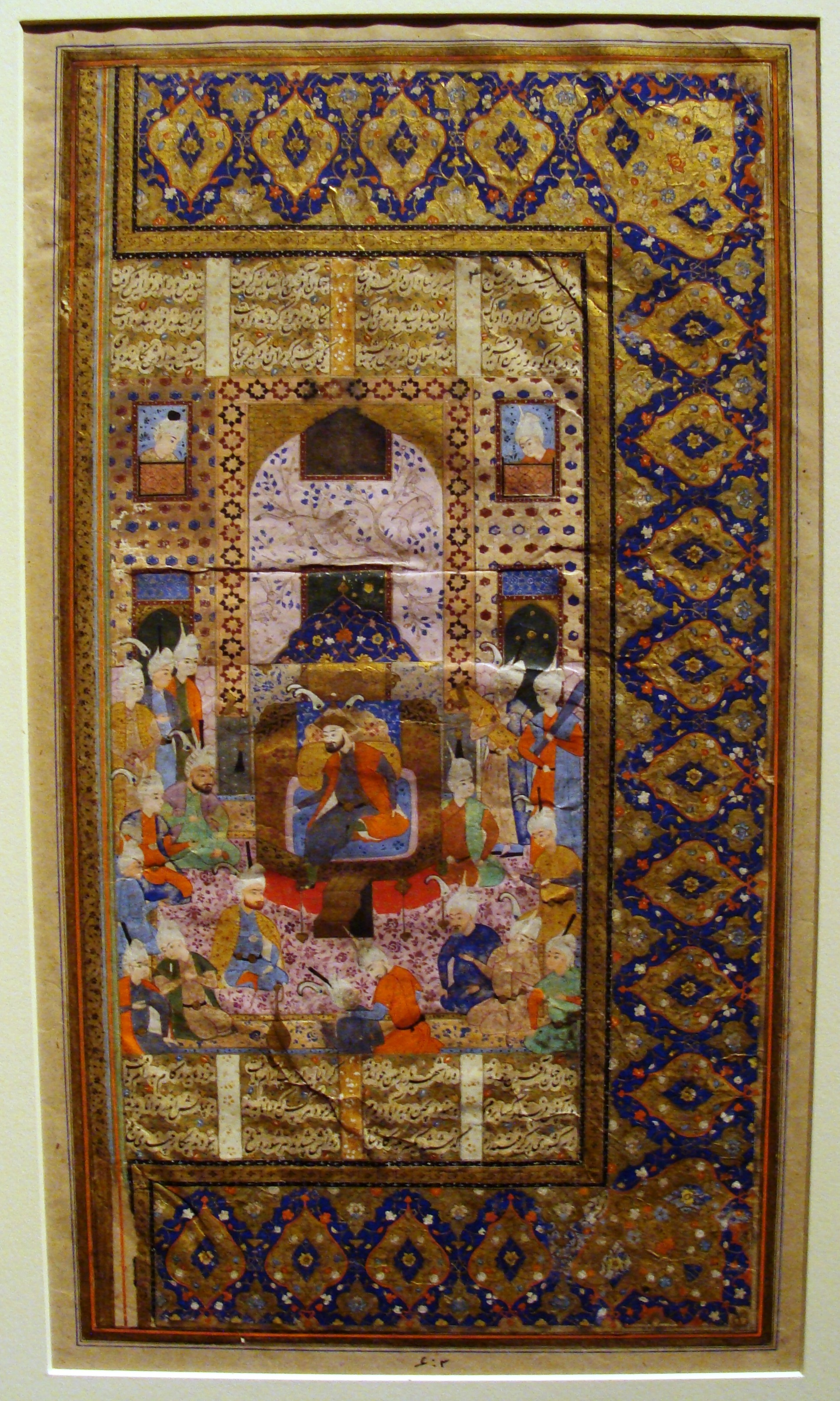
16th-century Shahnameh illustration of Kay Lohrasp seated on his throne.

Kay Lohrasp (Persian: لهراسپ) was a legendary Iranian king who ruled Iran after Kay Khosrow. He had two brave sons Vishtaspa (also known as Gushtasp) and the younger Zarir. Vishtaspa ruled Iran after his father. One of Kay Lohrasp’s most notable works is the construction of Balkh.

== Lohrasp in the Shahnameh ==
Lohrasp was not really the king of Iran; he ruled only part of Iran and was the head of his great tribes. The land he occupied is called Arzan or Arzāniān, and his whereabouts are still unknown. In fact, his son Goshtāsep and his grandson Esfandiyār are very famous. The character of the Lohraspian dynasty is God-worshiping, and it was by his son that the Zoroastrian religion was adopted in Iran.

Lohrasp was involved in the Kay Khosrow war but was not very famous. Zāl in his argument describes a weak and powerless person. Kay Khosrow was great during the war, but after all his victories, he broke once and closed all the doors of the palace and worshiped all the time. Shahnameh reports that Kay Khosrow chose Lohrasp but is not very trusted. Lohrasp is the other land and is very far from the Kay Khosrow . In the reign, Lohrasp only quarreled with his son Gushtasp, and Gushtasp intended to take his father's place, but the father would not allow it. Finally, Gushtasp goes to Rûm.

== Other accounts ==
Al-Tabari describes Lohrasp as having established many government agencies, and he also describes Nebuchadnezzar as one of his vassals, whom he sent to attack the Israelites. In the 6th century text, the Menog-i Khrad, Kay Lohrasp is said to have demolished Jerusalem, and dispersed and scattered the Jews. According to Ḥamza, the reason that Nebuchadnezzar was sent by Lohrasp to destroy Jerusalem was because the Jews had killed their king, a prophet descended from David, The Denkard says that "Bakhtenarsiya", (a later commentator says that the name Bakhtenarsiya refers to Rohham) was sent by Lohrasp to fight the idol worshipping king of Jerusalem.

== period of time ==
Preceded by Kai Khosrow	Legendary Kings of the Shahnameh; 120 years (2751–2871 after Keyumars)	Succeeded by Vishtaspa

== Gallery ==
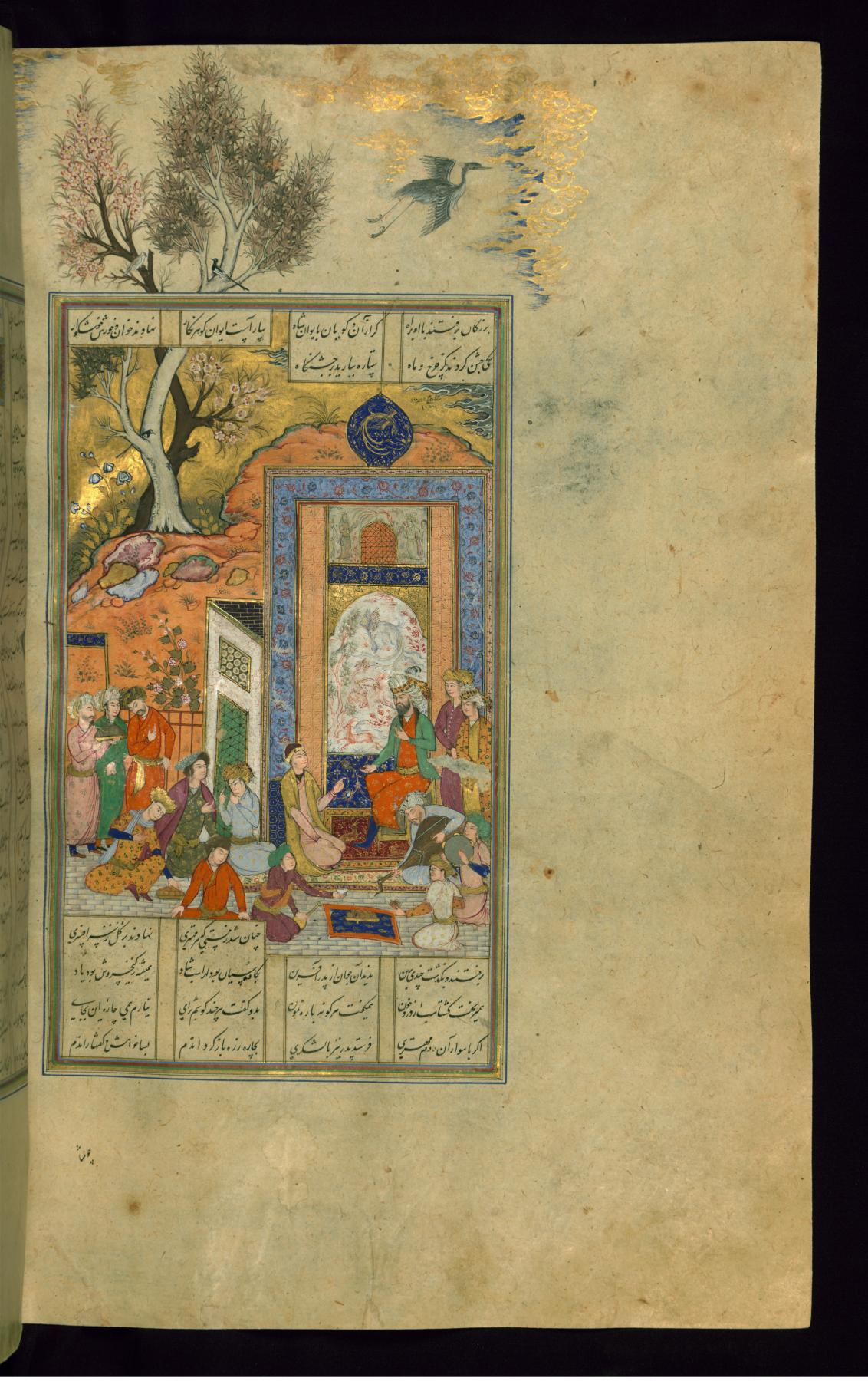
Lohrasp Enthroned

== See also ==
- Luarsab (given name)

== Sources ==
- Ferdowsi Shahnameh. From the Moscow version. Mohammed Publishing. ISBN 964-5566-35-5
- Brief History of the Earth p.10-12
- Lohrasp and Nebuchadrezzar, archived version
