= Luarsab (given name) =

- Gender: Male

Origin
- Origin: Persian
- Meaning: Red Horse
- Region of origin: Georgia

Luarsab (Georgian: ლუარსაბ) is a Georgian male name derived from the Persian Lohrāsp, a name of the legendary Kayanid king from Ferdowsi’s Shahnameh who reigned for 120 years.

== Notable people bearing this name ==
- Luarsab I
- Luarsab II
- Prince Luarsab of Kartli (died 1652)
- Prince Luarsab of Kartli (died 1698)
