= Ardeshir, Iran =

Ardeshir اردشير
- Village
- Location within Iran
- Coordinates: 38°45′01″N 46°44′50″E
- Country: Iran
- Province: East Azerbaijan
- County: Varzaqan
- Bakhsh: Central
- Rural District: Ozomdel-e Shomali

Population (2006)
  - Total: 68
- Time zone: UTC+3:30 (IRST)
  - Summer (DST): UTC+4:30 (IRDT)

Ardeshir (Persian: اردشير, also Romanized as Ardeshīr; also known as Ardashil’ and Ardashīr) is a village in Ozomdel-e Shomali Rural District, in the Central District of Varzaqan County, East Azerbaijan Province, Iran. At the 2006 census, its population was 68, in 17 families.
