= Katayun Pracher-Hilander =

Austrian politician (born 1971)

Member of the National Council
- Incumbent
- Assumed office 24 October 2024
- Constituency: Federal list

Personal details
- Born: 11 February 1971 (age 55)
- Party: Freedom Party

Katayun Pracher-Hilander (born 11 February 1971) is an Austrian politician of the Freedom Party serving as a member of the National Council since 2024. She is a psychologist in industrial and organizational and social psychology, and previously worked as a lecturer at UMIT Tirol and the Theresian Military Academy.
