= Ashi =

Zoroastrian goddess of fortune, wealth and matrimony

Ahrishwang
- Goddess of fortune, wealth and matrimony
- Ahrishwang depicted in a Kushan statue alongside Khwarrah
- Other names: Ashi Vanguhi, Ahrishwang, Ardokhsho, Ardoxsho, Ard, Arad, Ashishvang
- Avestan: 𐬀𐬴𐬌 𐬬𐬀𐬤𐬵𐬍
- Affiliation: The Thirty-Three Deities, Guardians of the Days of the Month
- Symbols: Cornucopia
- Day: 25th day of each month
- Texts: Ard Yasht, Mihr Yasht
- Gender: Female
- Region: Iran, Central Asia

Equivalents
- Greek: Tyche
- Hindu: Lakshmi
- Roman: Fortuna

See also Asha

Ashi (Avestan: Aši Vaŋuhī, “Good Reward”), also known as Ahrishwang in Middle Persian and Ardokhsho in Bactrian, is a Zoroastrian yazata and goddess of fortune, recompense, prosperity, fertility, and matrimony in ancient Iranian religion. Originally associated with the pre-Zoroastrian concept of “capricious luck”, she came to be understood in Zoroastrianism as the personification of rewards for good and evil conduct. She is as an essentially amoral divinity who nevertheless became “good” through her association with the Ahuric religion. Her name derives from the Indo-Iranian ṛti-, meaning “the act of obtaining” or “the thing obtained”. Her later ethnical characterization in the Gathas as "recompense for good deeds" was applied to her by Zoroaster, despite her affiliation with specifically material luck in her hymn.

Ahrishwang is described as beautiful, tall, strong, profit-bringing, and endowed with healing powers and high intelligence. Among the gifts she bestows is khwarrah, a concept itself personified as an independent divinity. She is regarded as the daughter of Ohrmazd and appears in the Mihr Yasht as the charioteer of Mithra. The twenty-fifth day of each month in the Zoroastrian calendar is dedicated to her.

The Avestan Ahrishwang, whose name derives from Proto-Iranian ṛti- (“reward”), is known from several devotional poems, particularly Yasht 17, which also describes her relationships with other deities. Her name, accompanied by the adjective “good”, her standing epithet in Zoroastrian times, also appears on the coinage of the Kushan kings in eastern Iran. On these coins, she is represented as a female figure holding a cornucopia.

== Etymology ==
The Avestan noun aši- (from arti-) literally means the “thing attained”, from the verbal root ar- (“get”). As a common noun, it denotes what is acquired, whether through luck or merit, with the latter sense prevailing in the Gathas. The word is an abstract noun formed from the root ar- (“to grant”) with the suffix -ti, belonging to the group of Younger Avestan personified abstracts such as Rāman (Joy, Peace), Daēnā (Conscience, Religion), Chista (Doctrine), and Hušiti (Good [Safe] Dwelling). The underlying root ar-, meaning “allot”, is illustrated by the expression aši- ar-, “grant, allot a share” (Y. 9.3, 52.3, 56.3). The word has no equivalent in Old Indian, according to P. Thieme, although H. Lommel proposed a different interpretation.

Other derivations have also been proposed. Schlerath considers unconvincing S. Insler's derivation of aši- from a root ar- meaning “deserve”, which Insler identifies in ārəm (Y. 43.10), allowing only a secondary association with ar- (“grant”). Schlerath likewise regards as highly unlikely G. Dumézil's proposal that Aši replaced an Indo-Iranian Bhaga (Old Indian bhaga-, “portion”), a view also advanced by J. Duchesne-Guillemin. The goddess probably received her characteristic epithet “great-gifted” or “treasure-laden” (mązā-rayi-) through her earlier character as a pagan goddess of Fortune.

In Zoroastrian Middle Persian, the name Aši and her standing epithet vaŋuhī became joined in the form Ahrishwang. The word aši- also developed normally into Middle and New Persian Ard, which existed alongside the theological-philological Avestan loan Ahrishwang.] In a Manichean Middle Persian text, the goddess appears as Baγ-ard (written bγʾrd), the guardian spirit of the border of Hurāsān (hwrʾsʾn wymndbʾn). Her name as a day of the month appears in Manichean texts as Erd (ʾyrd). Bīrunī's Chronology records Persian ʾrd, Sogdian ʾrdḵ, and Khwarazmian ʾrǰwḵy (artsūxī), the last two deriving from Ṛti-wahwī. In Bactrian and other Eastern Iranian languages, the deity's name may similarly derive from ṛti-wahwīš, “good reward”, yielding Bactrian αρδοχþο (Ardoxšo), Sogdian ʾrǰwxy, and Khwarezmian ʾrǰwxy, forms that distinguish these languages from western Iranian.

== Origin and development ==
The concept of Ahrishwang goes back to pre-Zoroastrian, “pagan” times. In the archaic Yasna Haptanghāiti, the Ahura is invoked with the Waters, his “wives”, and a group of divinities who, together with the fructifying waters, appear to represent the sustaining and fecund aspect of creation. This section was probably originally devoted largely to Vouruna. The divinities are Ahrishwang (Reward), Iš (Prosperity), Āzūiti (Fatness or Plenty), Frasasti (Satisfaction), and Parəndi (Nourishment). Several of these personified words have particular associations with sacrifice and worship, in addition to their general meanings. Parəndi, the last named, is also familiar from the Younger Avesta.

In the Gathas, Ahrishwang occurs seventeen times, without any trace of personification. Its epithet “the good one” (Younger Avestan vaŋuhī, cf. Pahlavi Ahrišwang) appears three times: Y. 51.10, “I call truth to me, to come with good reward”; Y. 51.21, “I pray for this good reward”; and Y. 43.5, “You appoint reward for deed and word: bad for the bad, good reward for the good.” In the last passage, “good reward” is opposed to the neuter akəm, “the bad, the evil”. Ahrishwang depends on human conduct, so that each individual can “rule at will over (his) reward” (Y. 50.9). The ethical Gathas accordingly use the common noun Ahrishwang in the sense of reward for good or ill, rather than unmerited acquisition. the divinity similarly becomes the personification of due recompense instead of capricious luck. In this interpretation, she is regularly called the “good Ahrishwang”, Ahrishwang vanhvī, presumably to distinguish her from the amoral pagan concept. This distinction is questioned by Schlerath, who doubts Boyce's statement that she is “regularly spoken of in the Zoroastrian scriptures as the ‘good Ahrishwang’ . . . in distinction presumably to the amoral pagan concept”.

The Gathas associate reward with good intention (vohu manah), since good and evil conduct depend on the moral choice of the individual. Zoroaster speaks to Ohrmazd of “that hand by which you hold these rewards (Ahrishwangš) which you will give to the follower of the Druj and to the follower of Asha” (Y. 43.4), and declares: “At the birth of the world ... you established an evil (reward) for evil, a good reward (Ashi) for good” (Y. 43.5). The individual, as master of his own reward (Y. 50.9), may act wisely to obtain a good Ahrishwang (Y. 50.3), while reward is associated several times with vohu manah, as in Y. 33.13. As a divinity, Ahrishwang is invoked in a dvandva compound with Armaiti (Y. 31.4) and appears apportioning the sentence or reward assigned to each person hereafter (Y. 34.12, 43.12). In the latter verse, she accompanies Soroush, the yazata of Obedience and guardian of prayer: “Soroush, accompanied by great-gifted Ahrishwang, who shall apportion the rewards (Ashiš) to the two groups ...”. Soroush bears the epithet Ahrishwangvant, “possessing rewards, rewarding”, suggesting his close relationship with Ahrishwang and his part in individual judgment. As with Ahrishwang, the name Soroush occurs in the Gathas alongside the common noun with which it is identical.

The rewards described in the Gathas need not be understood as spiritual gifts alone, any more than rewards in the pagan context should be regarded as exclusively material. The wealth-granting reward (ašī mazā-rayā) mentioned by Zoroaster in Y. 43.12 is probably material wealth serving as the outward token of spiritual reward. By contrast, H. Humbach adopts a purely “materialistic” understanding of Gathic Ahrishwang. In a later development, Ahrishwang may have suffered a gradual eclipse as Anahid gained greater popularity. Boyce suggests that Anahid's hymn came to be more frequently recited and better preserved, thereby acquiring the appearance of greater antiquity. Since “great-gifted” Ahrishwang was herself a Gathic figure worshipped of old, verses originally addressed to her may subsequently have been uttered in her rival's honour, making Anahid the debtor rather than the source of the earlier tradition.

The depiction of Ahrishwang as a woman on Kushan coins represents, according to Kreidl and Choksy, the final phase of an anthropomorphization that began with the feminine descriptions in her Yašt, since Ahrishwang was not personified in the Gathas. In Bactrian sources, Ardoxsho is extremely common on Kushan coinage but absent from the Rabatak inscription, later Bactrian documents, and theophoric names. On the coins of Kanishka and Huvishka, Ardoxsho (ΑΡΔΟΧϷΟ, incorrectly stamped as ΑϷΑΕΙΧϷΟ) is represented in a manner resembling the Greek goddess Tyche. She appears seated on a throne with a cornucopia, standing with a cornucopia, holding a victory palm, or raising one hand. These representations were copied in part from the Tyche of Antioch, depicted on the silver coinage of the Parthian king Mithradates I (ca. 171–138 BCE) and the bronze coinage of Vologeses III (104–107 and 111–146 CE), reflecting both Greek and Iranian influences on religious art and royal imagery. The combined etymological and visual evidence thus identifies the Bactrian continuation of Ahrishwang as a deity of fortune and wealth.

== Myths and worship ==
The pagan conception of Ahrishwang as Fortune, most generous to those in whose house she, “the giver of prosperity, sets her feet”, is conveyed in verses 6–14 of her yašt. Bailey describes these verses as expressing a “free and sober recognition of the values of the good things of this world”, emphasizing the pleasure taken in earthly riches, including women, cattle, gold, and silver. In verses 6–11 and 14, the homes of her favorites are described as full of treasures, cattle, and beautiful furniture, while their wives and young girls are richly clad and adorned with precious jewelry. A. Christensen remarked that this description accords well with the refined civilization of the Achaemenid empire, although it is uncertain whether this section of the yašt was composed as late as that period. As the goddess of fortune, Ahrishwang also confers victory on those whom she favors (vv. 12–13).

In the Younger Avesta, Ahrishwang is a goddess to whom an entire hymn, the Ard Yašt (Yt. 17), is dedicated. This hymn appears to preserve older material suggesting that she was once an important goddess of fertility and matrimony. As a goddess of abundance, Ahrishwang forbade her offerings to the sterile and immature, including old men and women and young boys and girls. Verse 53 specifies those excluded from receiving a share in her offerings: men whose semen has dried up, the “prostitute” (ǰahikā, a term used for any “bad” woman) who has passed the age of fertility, and young men and women who have not yet reached puberty. Her yašt thus presents Ahrishwang not only as a goddess of abundance but also as a goddess of fertility, who abhorred the immature as well as the barren.

This aversion to the immature is reflected in an old myth preserved in verses 55–56 of her hymn. Pursued by the Turas, or Turanians, and the swift-horsed Naotaras, or Naotarids, Ahrishwang concealed herself first beneath the foot of a bull and then beneath the neck of a ram, but was betrayed on both occasions by young boys and unwed girls. The episode recalls the story of Ulysses and the Cyclops, although its precise meaning remains obscure. Zoroaster's patron, Vištāspa, was himself a Naotara. In verses 57–59, Ahrishwang further complains to Ahura Mazdā about the “prostitute” with a barren womb, the woman who brings her husband a child fathered by another man, and powerful men who leave young women unmarried. She asks whether these circumstances require her to hide herself in heaven or beneath the earth. Ohrmazd responds in verses 60–61 by inviting her into his beautiful, royal house, where he promises to worship her with a sacrifice like that offered by Vištāspa.

Within the Avestan pantheon, Ahrishwang is the daughter of Ohrmazd and Spənta Ārmaiti, the sister of the Amehraspands, Soroush, Rashn, Mithra, and Daēnā (Yt. 17.16). It has been suggested that Soroush's epithet Ahrishwangia- signifies “related to or associated with Ahrishwang”. Ahrishwang herself drives swiftly in a chariot, perhaps to bestow her bounty on her worshippers, and also helps speed the chariot of Mithra, although precisely how she does so remains obscure. Her original connection with Mithra has been interpreted as that of Fortune attending the god of war. Cumont accordingly identified her with the Fortune depicted on Mithraic monuments.

Various depictions of the Goddess Ahrishwang

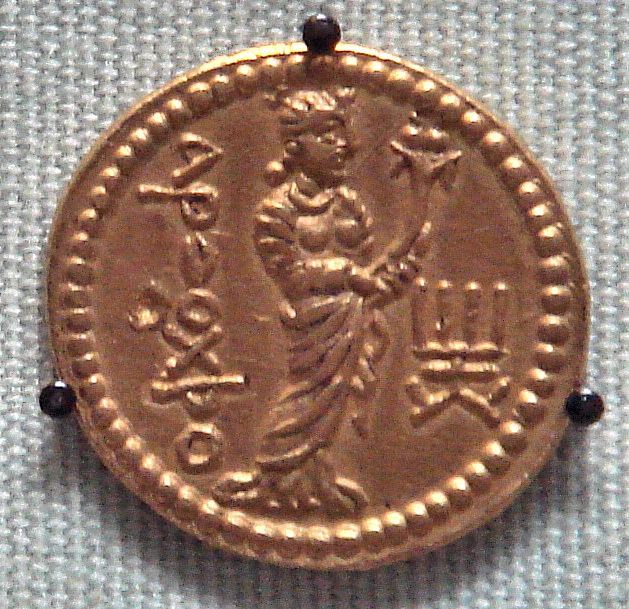

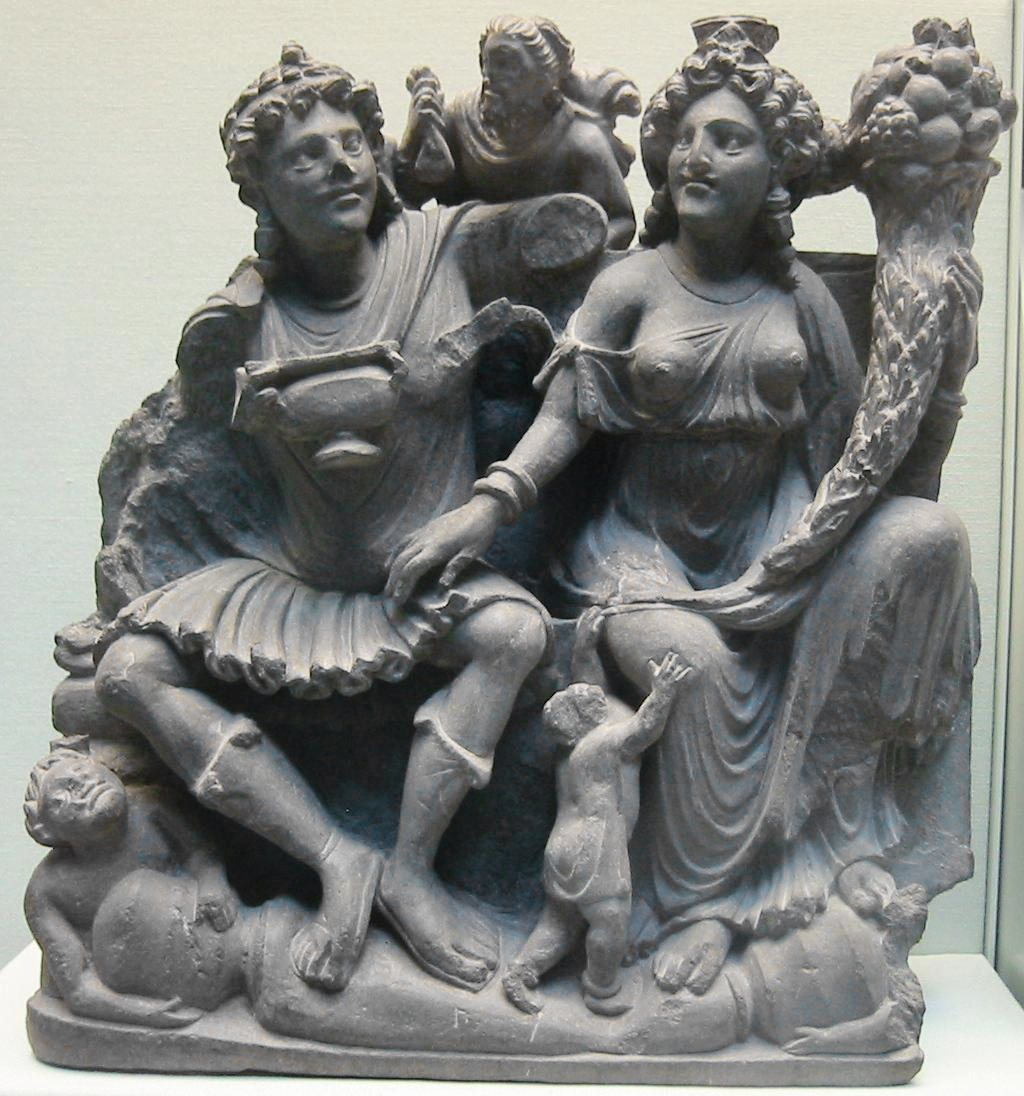

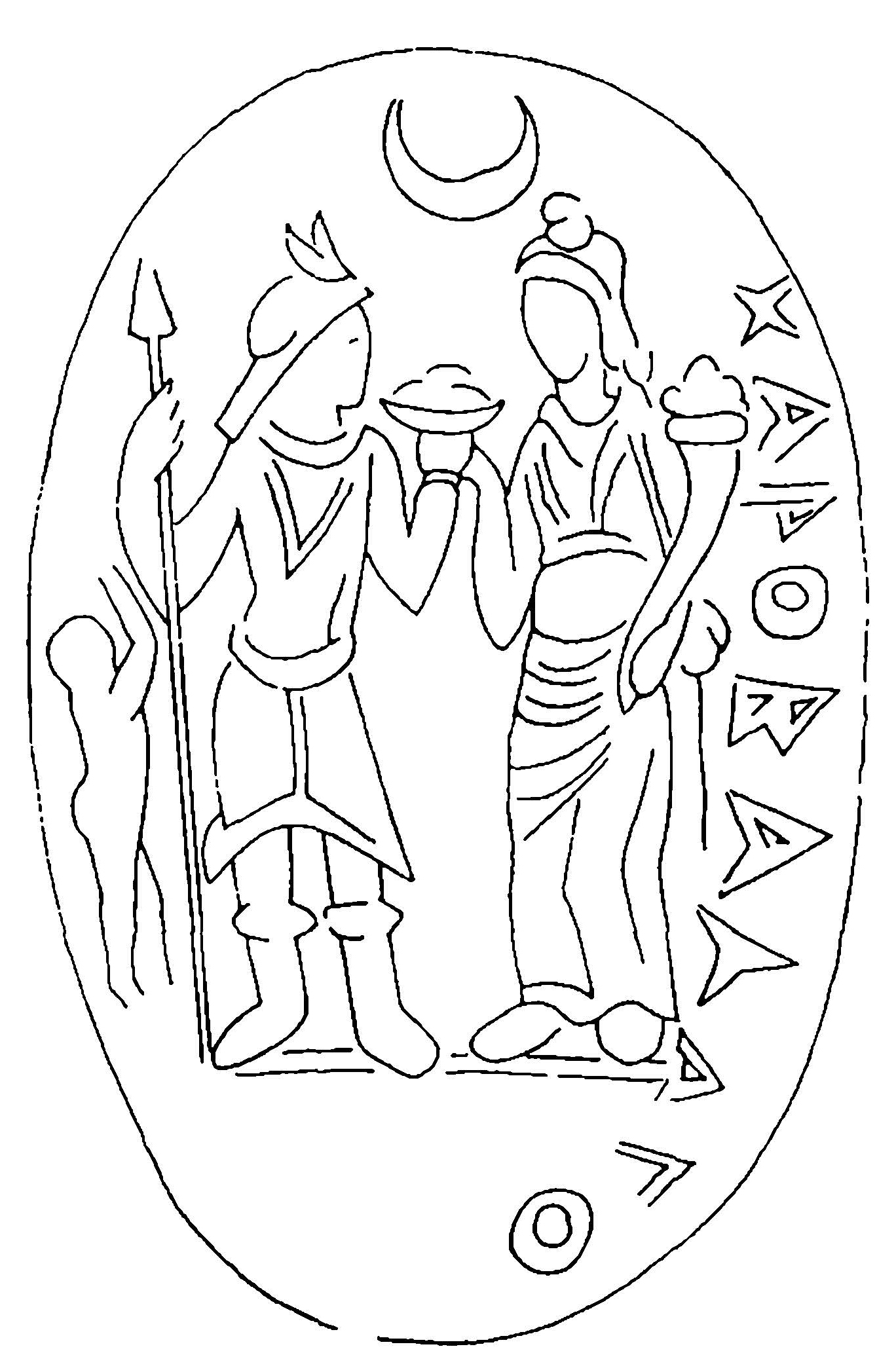

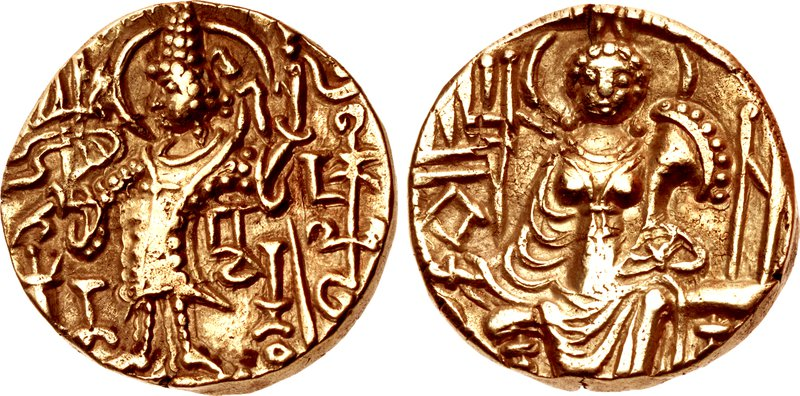

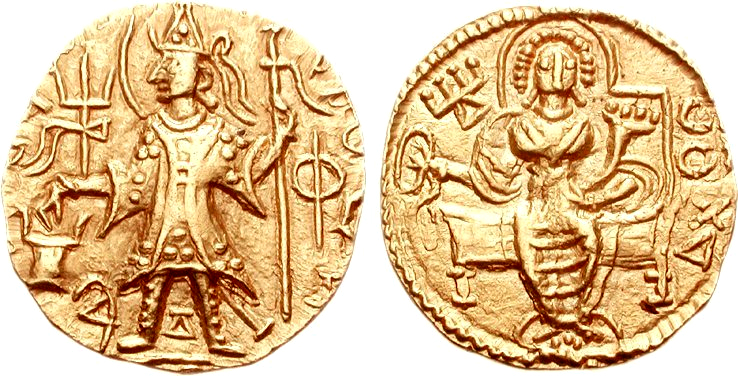

== Bibliography ==
- Boyce, Mary (1975), A History of Zoroastrianism, vol. 1, Leiden: Brill: 19f., 225f., 268ff.
- Dhalla, Maneckji Nusservanji (1938), History of Zoroastrianism, New York: OUP: 207–210.
- Schlerath, Bernfried (1983), "Ahrišwang", Encyclopaedia Iranica, vol. 1, New York: Routledge & Kegan Paul: 673–674.
- Schlerath, Bernfried & Skjærvø, Prods Oktor (1987), "Aši", Encyclopaedia Iranica, vol. 2, New York: Routledge & Kegan Paul: 750–751.
- Skjærvø, Prods Oktor (1987), "Ard Yašt", Encyclopaedia Iranica, vol. 2, New York: Routledge & Kegan Paul: 355–356.
