= Artashes Avoyan =

Armenian lawyer and politician

Artashes Avoyan (Armenian: Արտաշես Ավոյան; born December 25, 1972, in Yerevan) is an Armenian lawyer and politician. He graduated in 1994 from the faculty of Law of Yerevan State University.

In 1994–1997 during his compulsory military service he served as an investigator and senior investigator in the Military Prosecutor’s Office of Artsakh. In 1997–1998 he worked in the law division of the Union of Lawyers and Political Scientists of Armenia. In 1998–1999 he was senior adviser in the RA NA Standing Committee on State and Legal Affairs. In 1999–2002 he was an expert of Country of Law faction. In 1999–2004 he was a member of RA Central Electoral Commission. In 2004–2005 he was a Chief Adviser of the Minister of Culture and Youth Affairs. In 2005–2007 he was a member of RA Central Electoral Commission.

On May 12, 2007, he was elected as a deputy of the National Assembly by proportional electoral system.

On July 22, 2008, he was appointed Chief of Staff to the National Security Council of Armenia.
