= Bloodhound (missile) =

British surface-to-air missile system

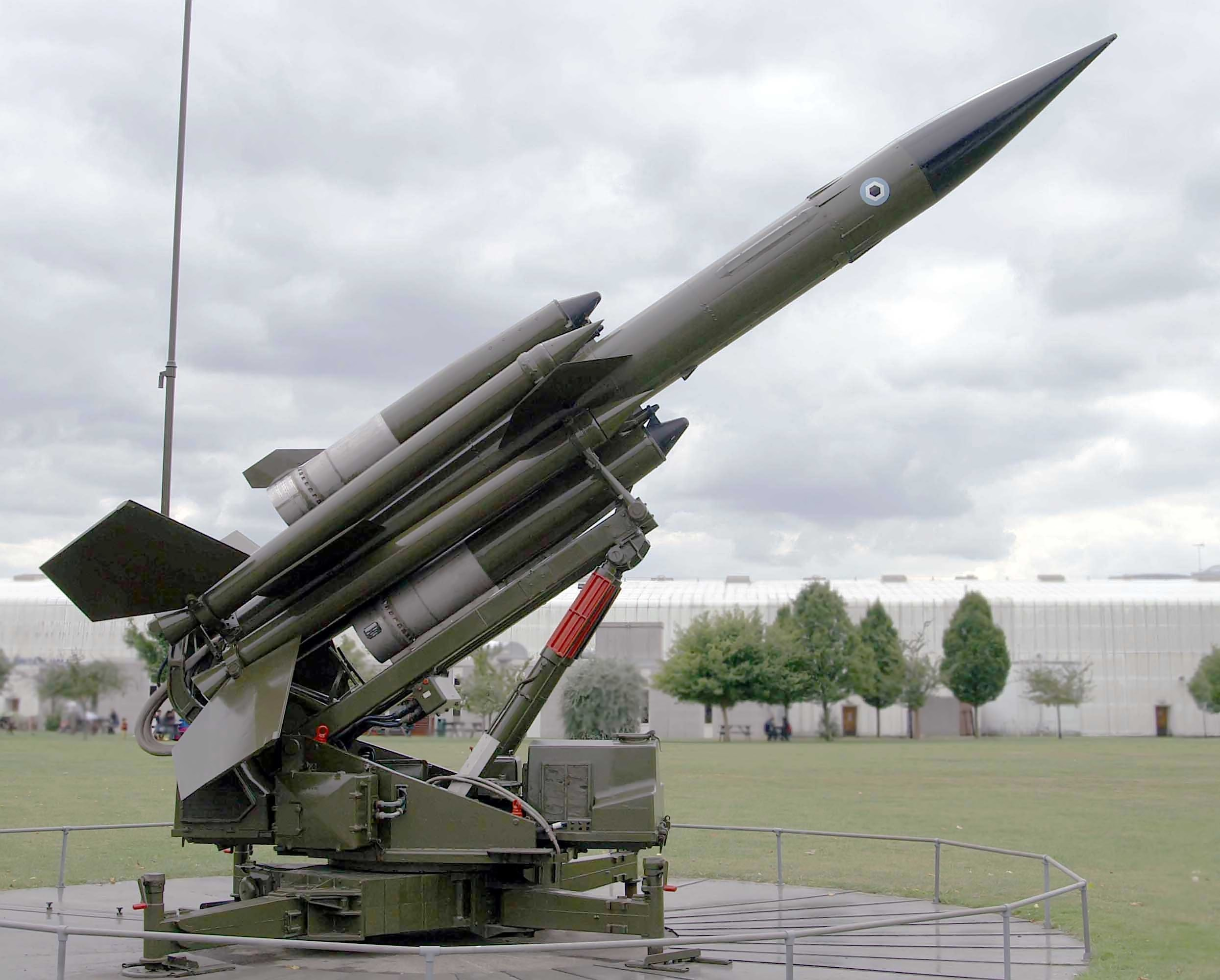
- A Bloodhound Mk. 2 missile at the Royal Air Force Museum London, Hendon.
- Type: Surface-to-air missile
- Place of origin: United Kingdom

Service history
- In service: 1958 (MK 1)/1964 (MK 2) – 1991
- Used by: See operators

Production history
- Designed: 1950s
- Manufacturer: Bristol Aeroplane Co.
- No. built: 783
- Variants: See variants

Specifications (MK 2)
- Mass: Overall: 2,270 kg (5,000 lb)
- Length: Overall: 8.46 m (27 ft 9 in)
- Diameter: Main body 54.6 cm (1 ft 9.5 in)
- Wingspan: Overall: 2.83 m (9 ft 3 in)
- Warhead: Continuous-rod warhead
- Detonation mechanism: Proximity fuze
- Engine: 2× Ramjets, 4× solid fuel boosters
- Operational range: 52 km (32 mi) (MK 1); 190 km (120 mi) (MK2)
- Maximum speed: Mach 2.7
- Guidance system: Semi-active radar homing
- Steering system: Control surfaces
- Launch platform: Fixed installation

The Bristol Bloodhound is a British ramjet powered surface-to-air missile developed during the 1950s. It served as the UK's main air defence weapon into the 1990s and was in large-scale service with the Royal Air Force (RAF) and the forces of four other countries.

Part of sweeping changes to the UK's defence posture, the Bloodhound was intended to protect the RAF's V bomber bases to preserve the deterrent force from attacking bombers that made it past the Lightning interceptor force. Bloodhound Mk. I entered service in December 1958, the first British guided weapon to enter full operational service. This was part of Stage 1 upgrades to the defensive systems, in the later Stage 2, both Bloodhound and the fighters would be replaced by a longer-range missile code named Blue Envoy. When this was cancelled in 1957, parts of its design were worked into Bloodhound Mk. II, roughly doubling the range of the missile. The Mk. I began to be replaced by the Mk. II starting in 1964. Mk. II performance was such that it was also selected as the interceptor missile in the Violet Friend ABM system, although this was ultimately cancelled.

The Bloodhound Mk. II was a relatively advanced missile for its era, roughly comparable to the US's Nike Hercules in terms of range and performance, but using an advanced continuous-wave semi-active radar homing system, offering excellent performance against electronic countermeasures and low-altitude targets. It also featured a digital computer for fire control that was also used for readiness checks and various calculations. It was a relatively large missile, which limited it to stationary defensive roles similar to the Hercules or the Soviets' S-25 Berkut, although Sweden operated its Bloodhounds in a semi-mobile form.

Bloodhound shares much in common with the English Electric Thunderbird, including some of the radar systems and guidance features. Thunderbird was smaller and much more mobile, seeing service with the British Army and several other forces. The two missiles served in tandem for some time, until the shorter-range role of the Thunderbird was replaced by the much smaller and fast-acting BAC Rapier starting in 1971. Bloodhound's longer range kept it in service until the threat of bomber attack by the Soviet Union was deemed to have disappeared with the dissolution of the union in 1991. The last Mk. II missile squadron stood down in July 1991, although Swiss examples remained operational until 1999.

== History ==
=== Early SAM development ===
During the late stages of World War II, the British armed forces began the development of surface-to-air missiles (SAMs), or as they became known in the UK, surface-to-air guided weapons (SAGW). The Royal Navy was primarily interested in weapons to counteract Luftwaffe bombers dropping glide bombs, which had been used with great effectiveness during the invasion of Italy, and looking toward countering the kamikaze threat in the Pacific. The British Army was interested in a longer-ranged system to supplant or even replace their anti-aircraft artillery. The Royal Air Force was largely uninterested at this point, and put their effort into air-to-air missiles.

From these different needs, two experimental SAGW systems emerged, the Navy's Fairey Stooge and Army's Brakemine. Stooge was a low-performance system, more of a drone aircraft than a missile, which had to be manually guided in front of approaching aircraft using radio control and then detonated by the operator. This limited it to daytime visual range and good weather, neither of which was satisfying. In contrast to Stooge, Brakemine was a more modern concept. While it offered only marginally better range than Stooge, its beam riding guidance was highly automated and allowed the missile to fly directly at its targets at high speed in any conditions, day or night.

Looking to the future, the Navy saw a need to counter jet-powered aircraft, demanding a much higher-performance system. In 1944, the Navy formed the "Guided Anti-Aircraft Projectile Committee", or GAP Committee, to consider such a design. The GAP team suggested combining the Navy's new Type 909 radar with a new missile to produce a Brakemine-like system but with considerably higher accuracy and much longer range. This was initially known as LOPGAP, for Liquid-Oxygen and Petrol, the proposed fuel.

In January 1947, the new Navy design was given the name Seaslug. Around the same time, an effort was underway to centralise all guided missile development at the Royal Aircraft Establishment's (RAE) new Guided Weapons Department. They took over LOPGAP development from the Navy, as well as using up most existing Stooge and Brakemine systems to gain familiarity with the needs of missile testing. They also issued a requirement for the Army and Air Force for a very long-range weapon to protect important installations like airfields and cities. This became the "Red Heathen" concept, with a desired range on the order of 91 km (56.81 mi, 49.37 nmi).

=== Seaslug and Red Heathen ===
During a review of the RAE's work by the Defence Research Policy Committee (DRPC) in March 1948, a lack of manpower at the RAE was a serious issue and Seaslug was downgraded in importance in favour of Red Heathen. Around the same time, the Army began to express doubts about the Red Heathen as it became clear that the beam riding guidance systems of the early experimental missiles did not work at long range. (Note: Beam riding missiles have the disadvantage of not being able to "lead" their target unless a second radar beam is used, as in Nike Ajax. They also have the problem that radar signals spread out with increasing distance, making the missile increasingly inaccurate at longer ranges. Which of these two issues, or possibly both, is the reason for this switch is not mentioned in available sources.) They suggested Seaslug might be a good interim development.

After considerable debate, in September 1948 Seaslug was restarted as "insurance" against problems in Red Heathen, and in 1949, moved to "top priority". A development contract was signed with Armstrong Whitworth lead development, and the Project 502 industry group was organized in 1949 to produce it. The DRPC suggested downgrading Red Heathen to use a missile with performance roughly equal to Seaslug, but replacing its guidance with a semi-active radar homing system which was more suitable for development of a long-range system in the future. English Electric continued development of this "new" Red Heathen. Later, looking for a second approach to the requirement, using a ramjet instead of a rocket motor, the RAE approached de Havilland, but they declined due to workload. The RAE then turned to the Bristol Aeroplane Company, signing an agreement late in 1949 for "Red Duster", which Bristol referred to as "Project 1220". Armstrong, Bristol and EE were now all working on different approaches to the same basic requirement. Ferranti was brought on to begin development of the new radars and guidance systems.

Before long, the two Red Heathen entries began to diverge, and the two designs were given their own rainbow codes; EE's design became "Red Shoes", and Bristol's became "Red Duster". Bristol's efforts were fairly similar to EE's in most ways, although it was somewhat less mobile while offering somewhat better range.

=== The Stage Plan ===
After the end of the Second World War, UK air defences were run down, on the assumption that it would be at least a decade before another war started. However, the Soviet atomic bomb test of 1949 forced a re-evaluation of that policy, and UK defence planners started studying the problems of building a more integrated air defence network than the patchwork of WWII expediencies.

The Cherry Report called for a reorganisation of existing radars under the ROTOR project along with new control centres to better coordinate fighters and anti-aircraft guns. This was strictly a stop-gap measure however; over the longer term there would be a requirement for deployment of new long-range radars in place of the Chain Home systems from the war, construction of command and control sites able to survive a nuclear attack, interceptors of ever-increasing performance, and anti-aircraft missiles and guns to provide a last-ditch defence.

The missile portion was the newest and least understood technology. In order to deploy quickly and gain experience with these systems, the "Stage Plan" was developed. "Stage 1" called for missiles based on a LOPGAP/Seaslug-type missile with a range of only 20 miles with capabilities against subsonic or low-supersonic attacking aircraft, which were assumed to be at medium or high altitudes. The original long-range Red Heathen concept then became Stage 2, aiming to replace the Stage 1 design in the 1960s The Stage 1 missile would be based on LOPGAP.

=== Development ===
The RAE had suggested the use of a ramjet for power as it offered better fuel economy, and thus allowed for longer range. Bristol had only passing experience with this engine design, so they began a long series of tests to develop it. As the ramjet only operates effectively at high speeds over Mach 1, Bristol built a series of testbed airframes to flight-test the engines. The first, JTV-1, (Note: The RAE had renamed the LOPGAP "RTV-1" for Rocket Test Vehicle, so Bristol's JTV for Jet Test Vehicle was an obvious choice.) resembled a flying torpedo with the ramjets fitted to the end of the cruciform rear fins. Early problems were ironed out and the JTV series was the first British ramjet powered aircraft to operate continually at supersonic speeds.

Once the JTV testing started to proceed, Bristol studied a series of airframe designs. The first was a long tube with an intake at the front, and four delta-shaped fins arranged near the front of the fuselage. The intake and wings give it some resemblance to the English Electric Lightning, albeit with a long tube sticking out of the aft end. This arrangement left little internal room for fuel or guidance, as the tube ran down the centre of the entire fuselage. A second design was similar, but used mid-mounted fins of reverse-delta shape (flat at the front) with small intakes at their roots. The performance of these intakes was not well understood, and considered risky. The final design was essentially a small aircraft, with mid-set trapezoidal wings and four small swept wing fins at the extreme rear. In this version, two engines were mounted on the wing tips, similar to the mounting used on the JTV series and thus better understood.

One unique feature of the new design was the aerodynamic control system known as "twist and steer". Typical large missile designs use control surfaces at the tail mounted in-line with symmetric wings mounted near the fuselage midpoint. The control surfaces tilt the missile relative to its direction of travel, causing the wings to become non-symmetrical relative the airflow, generating lift that turns the missile. Bristol was concerned that the angles needed to generate the required lift using this method would be too great for the engines intakes to deal with, so it adopted the twist and steer system, first experimented with on the war-era Brakemine project.

In this system the four cropped-delta surfaces at the tail were fixed and used only for stability, not control. Directional control was provided though two large mid-mounted wings which could be rotated independently to large angles. The guidance system rotated the wings in opposite directions to roll the missile until the wings were perpendicular to the target, and then rotated them in the same direction to provide lift in the required direction. This meant that the wings could be rotated to the angles required to generate large amounts of lift, without rotating the missile body itself. This kept airflow in the direction of the missile body, and thus the engine intakes, as well as greatly reducing the drag caused by the tilting of the fuselage across the relative wind. The long, thin fuselage offered very low rotational inertia, conferring excellent homing performance in the last few seconds. The engines were mounted above and below these wings on short extensions.

In the initial designs, a single very large solid fuel booster launched the missile off its launcher and powered it to speeds where the ramjets could take over.

=== Flight testing ===
In 1952 the design was accepted by the Combined United Kingdom/Australia Committee for Trials. A prototype of the new layout was built and flown in Wales as the 1/4-scale XTV-1, powered by three 5-inch boosters strapped together. This demonstrated that the overall length with the booster attached would be a significant problem in the field. In response, the original booster was re-designed as a series of four smaller rockets designed to "wrap around" the missile fuselage. This layout was tested on the 1/3 scale XTV-2, the full-sized but unpowered XTV-3 that tested the new boosters, and finally the full-sized and powered XTV-4. The final modification, first tested on the XTV-3, was to replace the four rear fins with two larger ones, which allowed the four booster motors to be mounted on a common ring, ensuring they separated in different directions. This resulted in the definitive XTV-5.

As the design matured, the engine requirements were finalised. The resulting Bristol Thor was originally designed in conjunction with Boeing, which had extensive experience with the similar engines of the BOMARC missile. Testing of the prototype production versions, known as XRD (eXperimental Red Duster), moved to the Woomera range in South Australia in mid-1953. These proved very disappointing due to ramjet problems, which were traced to the use of a flare as an ignition source inside the engine. This was replaced with an igniter design provided by the National Gas Turbine Establishment and the problems were quickly sorted out. Firings against GAF Jindivik target aircraft started in 1956, and eventually 500 tests of all of the designs were completed before it entered service.

Guidance was semi-automatic, with the targets initially identified by existing early warning radar sites and then handed off to the Bloodhound sites for local detection and attack. This was handled by the truck-mounted Type 83 "Yellow River" pulse radar system that could be fairly easily jammed and was vulnerable to ground "clutter", thus degrading low-level capability.

By the time Bloodhound was ready for deployment, the solid-fuelled Red Shoes, now known as the English Electric Thunderbird, was proving successful and the British Army dropped its orders for the Bloodhound in favour of the Thunderbird. The Bloodhound Mk.1 entered British service in 1958, and was selected for the Royal Australian Air Force (RAAF) in November of that year. Deployment of the Bloodhound Mk. I began in 1958, initially to provide protection for the RAF's V bomber bases. Australian deployments started in January 1961.

Although the Bloodhound was successful technically, Government auditors found that Ferranti had made far larger profits than projected from the Bloodhound I contract. Sir John Lang chaired an inquiry into the matter. Ferranti Chairman, Sebastian de Ferranti, agreed to pay back £4.25 million to the government in 1964.

=== Mark II ===
Royal Air Force Bloodhound operational missile sites
Mk. 1 site; Mk. 2 site; Both

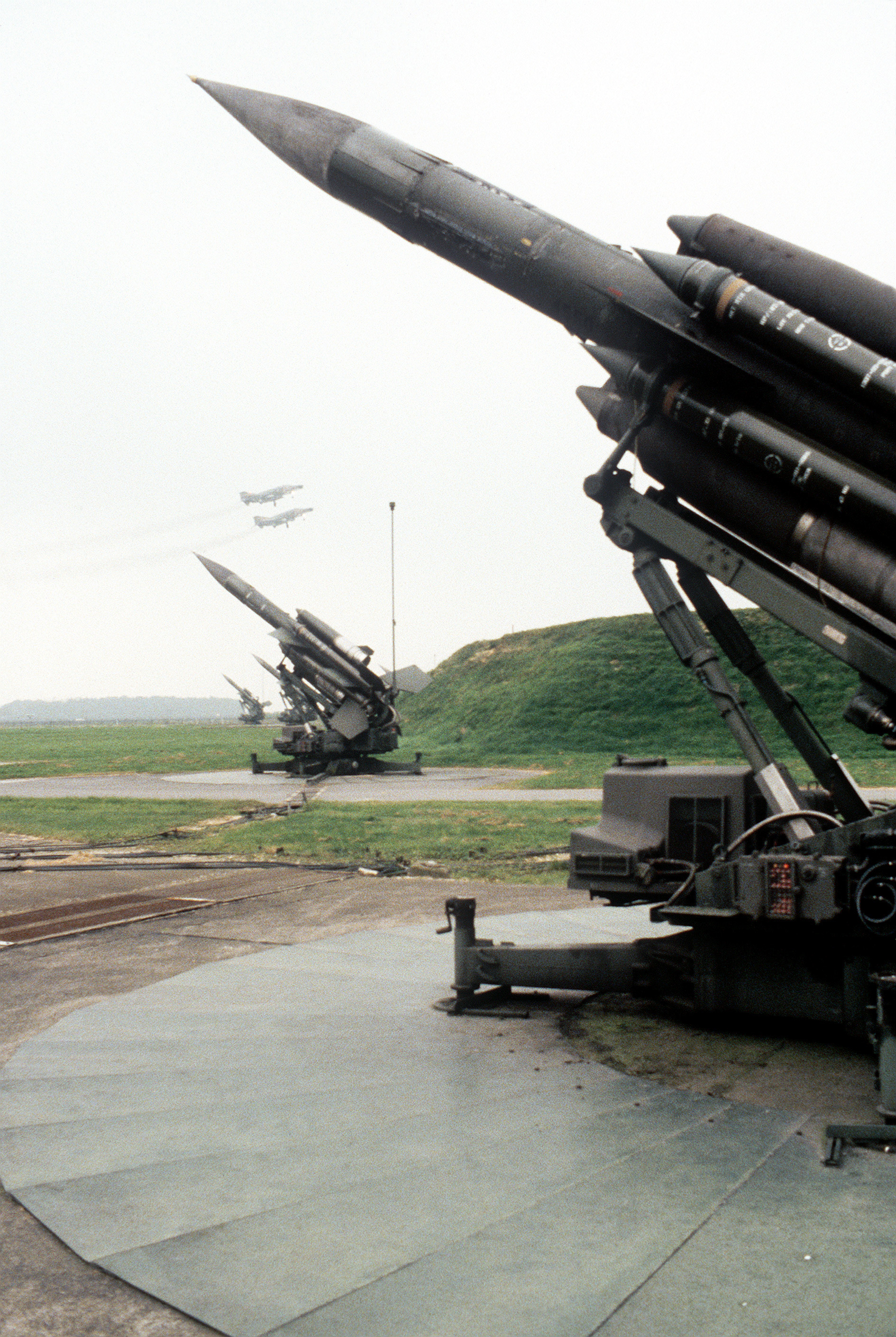
Bloodhound Mk II missiles deployed to Germany for exercise REFORGER '82.

By 1955 it appeared that the Stage 2 missile, originally known as Green Sparkler but now as Blue Envoy, was too far beyond the state of the art to be able to enter service before the Thunderbird and Bloodhound became obsolete. However, the much improved continuous wave radar systems being developed for the same project were progressing well. In order to address the performance gap due to the delays, interim (or vulgar) Stages were added to the Stage plan. "Stage 1 1/2" combined a slightly upgraded Thunderbird with radar technology from Blue Envoy, while "Stage 1 3/4" would do the same to Bloodhound.

In 1957 the entire Stage concept was abandoned as part of the 1957 Defence White Paper. The Paper argued that the Soviets would move their strategic forces to ballistic missiles and that the likelihood of an air attack solely by bombers would be increasingly unlikely. An attack by bombers would simply signal that missiles were also on their way. In this case, defending the V bombers against air attack did nothing; the only way they could survive would be to launch to holding areas on any suggestion of any sort of attack. In this case, there was no point trying to defend the bomber bases, and Blue Envoy was not needed.

Its cancellation caught Bristol by surprise, and their missile division, Bristol Dynamics, had no other projects to fall back on. Bristol engineers sharing a taxi with their Ferranti counterparts hatched a new plan to adopt the Blue Envoy ramjets and radars to a lengthened Bloodhound, and submitted this for study. The proposal was accepted, producing the Bloodhound Mk. II.

The Mk. II featured a more powerful Thor engine based on changes investigated in Blue Envoy. The increased power allowed the weights to be increased, and to take advantage of this the fuselage was stretched to allow more fuel storage. These changes dramatically extended range from about 35 to 80 kilometres (22 to 50 mi), pushing the practical engagement distance out to about 50 kilometres (31 mi) (although detected at a longer range, the missile takes time to travel to its target, during which the target approaches the base).

The Mk. II was guided by either the Ferranti Type 86 "Firelight" radar for mobile use, or the larger fixed-emplacement Marconi Type 87 "Scorpion". In addition to its own illumination and tracking antennas, the Scorpion also added one of the receiver antennas out of a Bloodhound missile body onto the same antenna framework. This antenna was used to determine what the missile's own receiver was seeing, which was used for jamming detection and assessment. The new radars eliminated problems with ground reflections, allowing the missile to be fired at any visible target, no matter how close to the ground. Combined with the new engines, the Mk. II had an extended altitude performance between 150 and 65,000 feet (46 and 19,812 m).

The use of a CW radar presented a problem for the semi-automatic guidance system. Continuous wave radar systems rely on the Doppler effect to detect moving targets, comparing returned signals to the radar signal being broadcast, and looking for any shift in frequency. However, in the Bloodhound's case the missile was moving away from the reference signal as fast, or faster, than the target would be approaching it. The missile would need to know the velocity of the target as well as its own airspeed in order to know what frequency to look for. But this information was known only to the radar station on the ground, since the missile did not broadcast any signals of its own.

To solve this problem, the radar site also broadcast an omnidirectional reference signal that was shifted to the frequency that the missile's receiver should be looking for, taking into account both the target and missile speed. Thus the missile only had to compare the signal from its nose-mounted receiver with the signal from the launch site, greatly simplifying the electronics.

Many of the calculations of lead, frequency shifting, and pointing angles for the radars were handled by the custom-built Ferranti Argus computer. This machine would later go on to be a successful industrial control computer which was sold all over Europe for a wide variety of roles.

The Mk. II started tests in 1963 and entered RAF service in 1964. Unlike the Mk. I that had limited performance advantages compared to the Thunderbird, the Mk. II was a much more formidable weapon, with capabilities against Mach 2 aircraft at high altitudes. Several new Bloodhound bases were set up for the Mk. II, and some of the Mk. I bases were updated to host the Mk. II.

There was an export version planned, Bloodhound 21, that had less sophisticated electronic countermeasures equipment.

=== Further developments ===
The planned Mk. III (also known as RO 166) was a nuclear warhead-equipped Mk. II with a longer range – around 75 miles (121 km) – achieved with improved ramjet engine and larger boosters. This was also to be the interceptor for the Violet Friend anti-ballistic missile system, which added a radio control link to allow the missile to be guided into the rough interception area while the enemy warhead was still too far away for the Type 86 radar to pick up. The project, one of several adaptations of existing British missiles to carry tactical nuclear devices, was cancelled in 1960.

The Mk. IV was a cancelled mobile version, based on Swedish Army field experience.

== Basic description ==
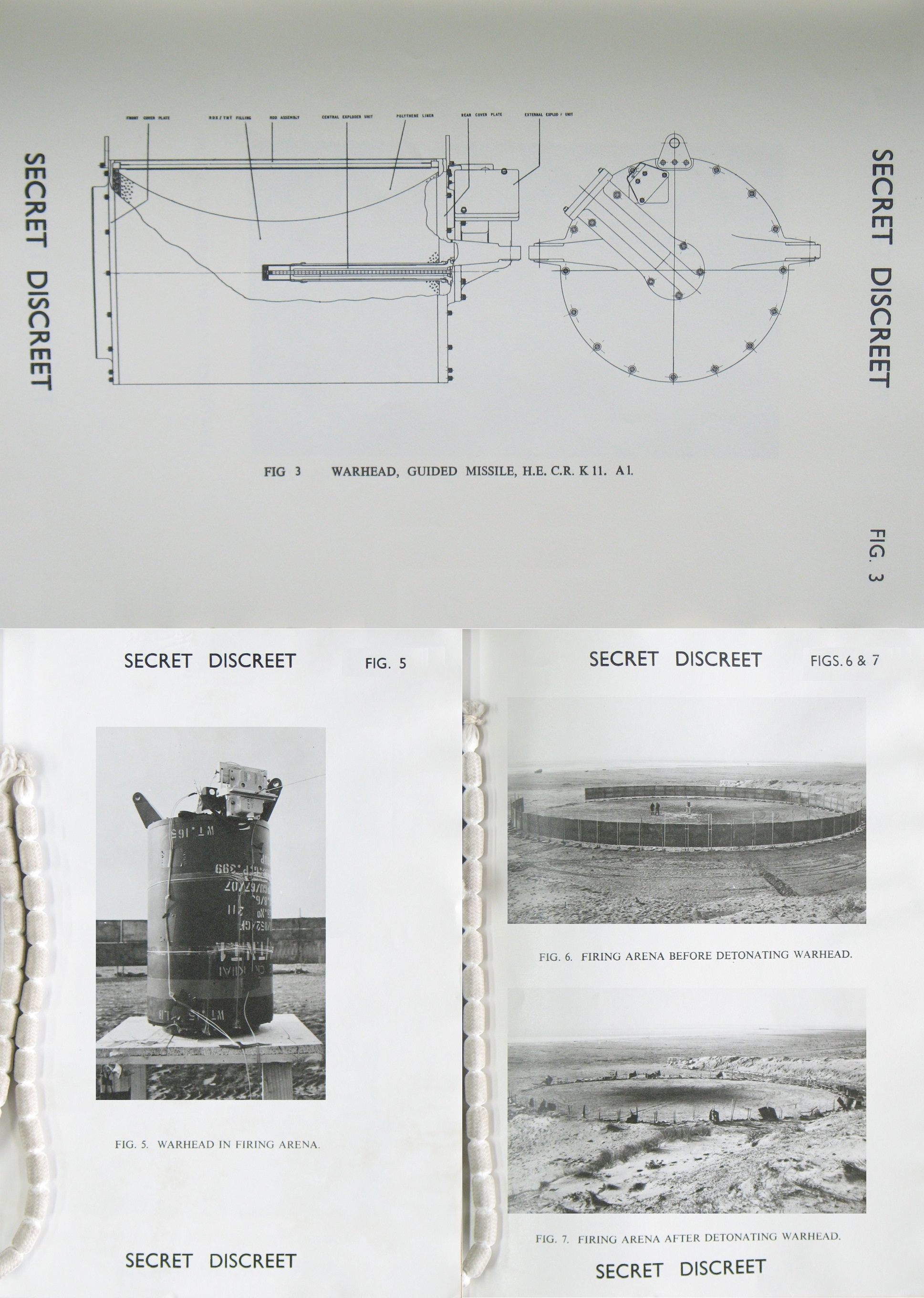
Before-and-after detonation of a K11A1 continuous rod warhead intended for Bloodhound Mk.2

The main missile is a long cylinder of magnesium frames and aluminium alloy skin with a prominent ogive nose cone at the front and some boat-tailing at the rear. Small aluminium-covered wooden cropped-delta wings are mounted midpoint, providing pitch and roll control by pivoting in unison or independently with additional steering provided by differential fuel feed to each of the ram jets. Two smaller rectangular fixed surfaces were mounted in-line with the main wings, almost at the rear of the missile.

The boost engines are held together as a single assembly by a metal ring at the rear of the missile. Each motor has a small hook on the ring as well as similar one at the front holding it to the missile body. After firing, when the thrust of the rockets falls below the thrust of the now-lit ramjets, the boosters slide rearward until the front hook disengages from the missile body. The boosters are then free to rotate around their attachment to the metal ring, and are designed to rotate outward, away from the fuselage. In action, they fold open like the petals on a flower, greatly increasing drag and pulling the entire four-booster assembly away from the missile body.

Small inlets on the roots of the stub wings holding the engines allow air into the missile body for two tasks. Two ram air turbines driving turbopumps generate hydraulic power for the wing control system, and a fuel pump that feeds the engines. Smaller inlet tubes provide ram air to pressurise the fuel tanks. Kerosene fuel is held in two large rubber bag tanks in bays either side of the wing bay where the wings are attached. Electrical power was provided by a molten salt battery. At room temperature, this would be inert and suitable for long-term storage without degradation, but was heated to its working temperature by a pyrotechnic heat source ignited at launch.

Although in tests the Bloodhound had executed direct hits on target bombers flying at 50,000 feet (15,000 m), Mark II production models, in common with many air-to-air and surface-to-air missiles of that period and after, had a proximity fuzed continuous rod warhead (known as the K11A1) designed to destroy attacking aircraft without requiring a direct hit.

== Variants ==
=== Mk I ===
- Length : 7.7 m
- Launch Weight : 2,000 kg
- Warhead: 200 lb (91 kg), continuous-wave radar proximity fuse
- Range : 28 nmi (52 km; 32 mi)
- Max. Speed : Mach 2.2
- Propulsion
  - Main : 2× Bristol Thor ramjet engines - total thrust 100,000 lb
  - Booster : 4× Gosling booster rockets - thrust 5,000 lb each
  - Navigation systems were designed by Desmond Sheriff

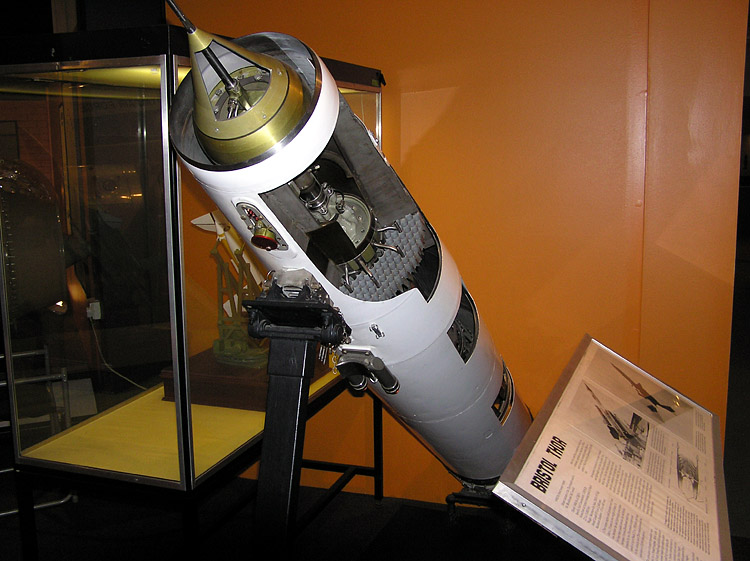
One of the two Bristol Thor ramjet engines of a Bloodhound missile

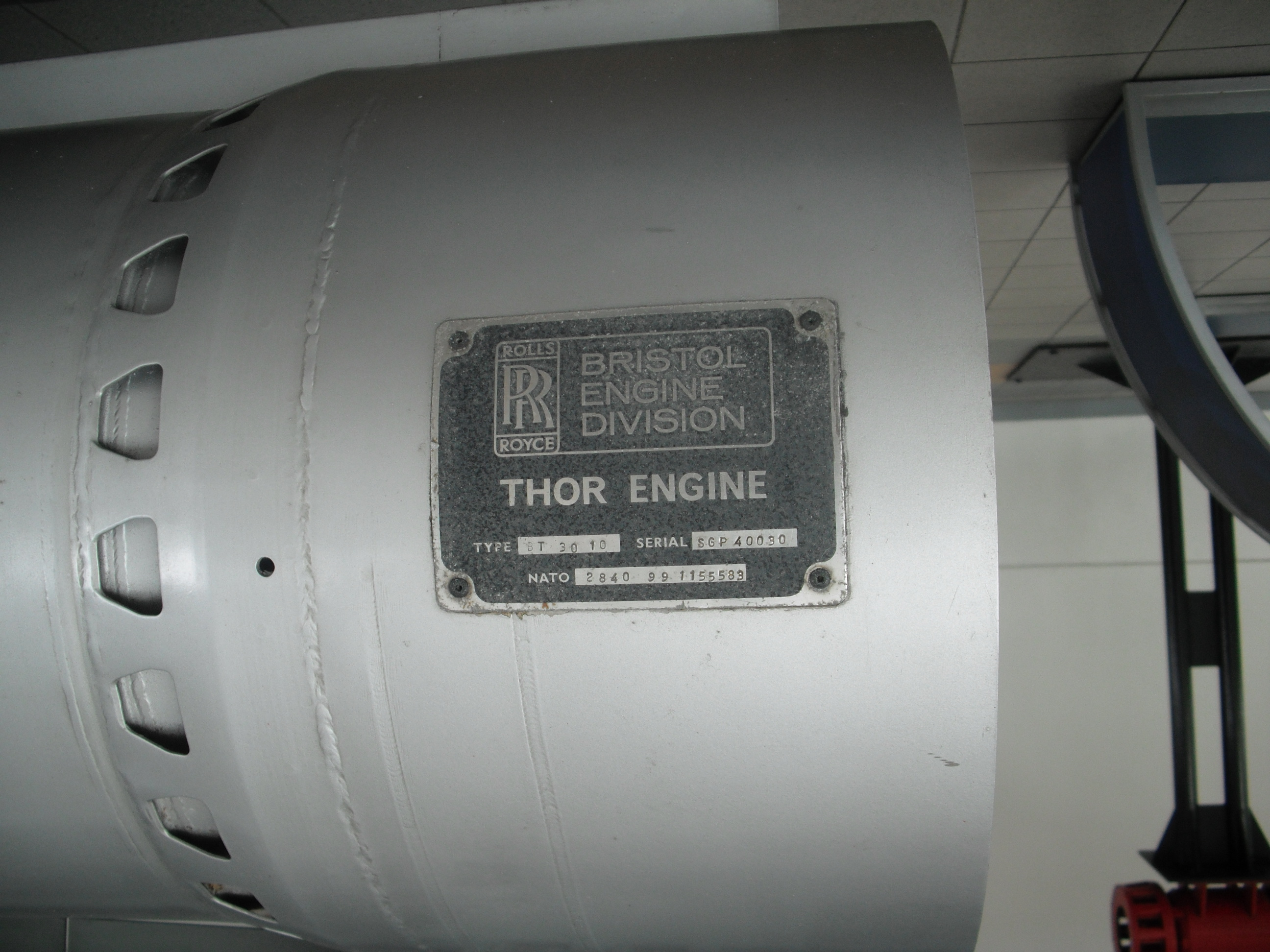
Manufacturer tag of Bristol Thor found near the exhaust end of the Thor ramjet engine

=== Mk II ===
- Length : 8.45 m
- Launch Weight :
- Warhead : 395 lb (179 kg), pulse radar proximity fuse
- Range : 100 nmi (190 km; 120 mi)
- Max. Speed : Mach 2.7
- Propulsion
  - Main : 2× Thor ramjet engines (Improved)
  - Booster : 4× Gosling booster rockets

=== Mk III ===
The planned Mk III (also known as RO 166) was a Mark II with 6 kiloton nuclear warhead and a range of around 125 mi (201 km) achieved with an improved ramjet engine and bigger boosters. The project, one of several adaptations of existing British missiles to carry tactical nuclear devices, was cancelled in 1960. There is evidence that the intention was to "poison" the warheads of nuclear weapons carried by an attacking force via the neutron flux emitted by the warhead.

=== Mk IV ===
This would have been a mobile version of Bloodhound.

== Operators ==
Australia

- Royal Australian Air Force
  - No. 30 Squadron RAAF

Myanmar
60 units supplied by Singapore.
Singapore

- Republic of Singapore Air Force (60 units acquired from the RAF in 1968. In 1994, some missiles including the AMES Type-87 Scorpion guidance radars were secretly sold to Myanmar.)
  - 170 Squadron, Republic of Singapore Air Force (Mk II)

Sweden

- Swedish Air Force
  - Rb 65: Swedish military designation of Mk I
  - Rb 68: Swedish military designation of Mk II
  - Svea Wing (F 8) in Barkarby had two missile squadrons with Rb 68
  - Scania Wing (F 10) in Ängelholm had one missile squadron with Rb 68
  - Kalmar Wing (F 12) in Kalmar had one missile squadron with Rb 68
  - Bråvalla Wing (F 13) in Norrköping had one missile squadron with Rb 68
  - Blekinge Wing (F 17) in Ronneby had one missile squadron with Rb 68

Switzerland

- Swiss Air Force
  - BL-64 : Swiss military designation

United Kingdom

- Royal Air Force
  - No. 25 Squadron RAF (Mk II)
  - No. 33 Squadron RAF (Mk II)
  - No. 41 Squadron RAF (Mk II)
  - No. 62 Squadron RAF (Mk I)
  - No. 65 Squadron RAF (Mk II)
  - No. 85 Squadron RAF (Mk II)
  - No. 94 Squadron RAF (Mk I)
  - No. 112 Squadron RAF (Mk I) and (Mk II)
  - No. 141 Squadron RAF (Mk I)
  - No. 222 Squadron RAF (Mk I)
  - No. 242 Squadron RAF (Mk I)
  - No. 247 Squadron RAF (Mk I)
  - No. 257 Squadron RAF (Mk I)
  - No. 263 Squadron RAF (Mk I)
  - No. 264 Squadron RAF (Mk I)
  - No. 266 Squadron RAF (Mk I)

== Preserved examples ==
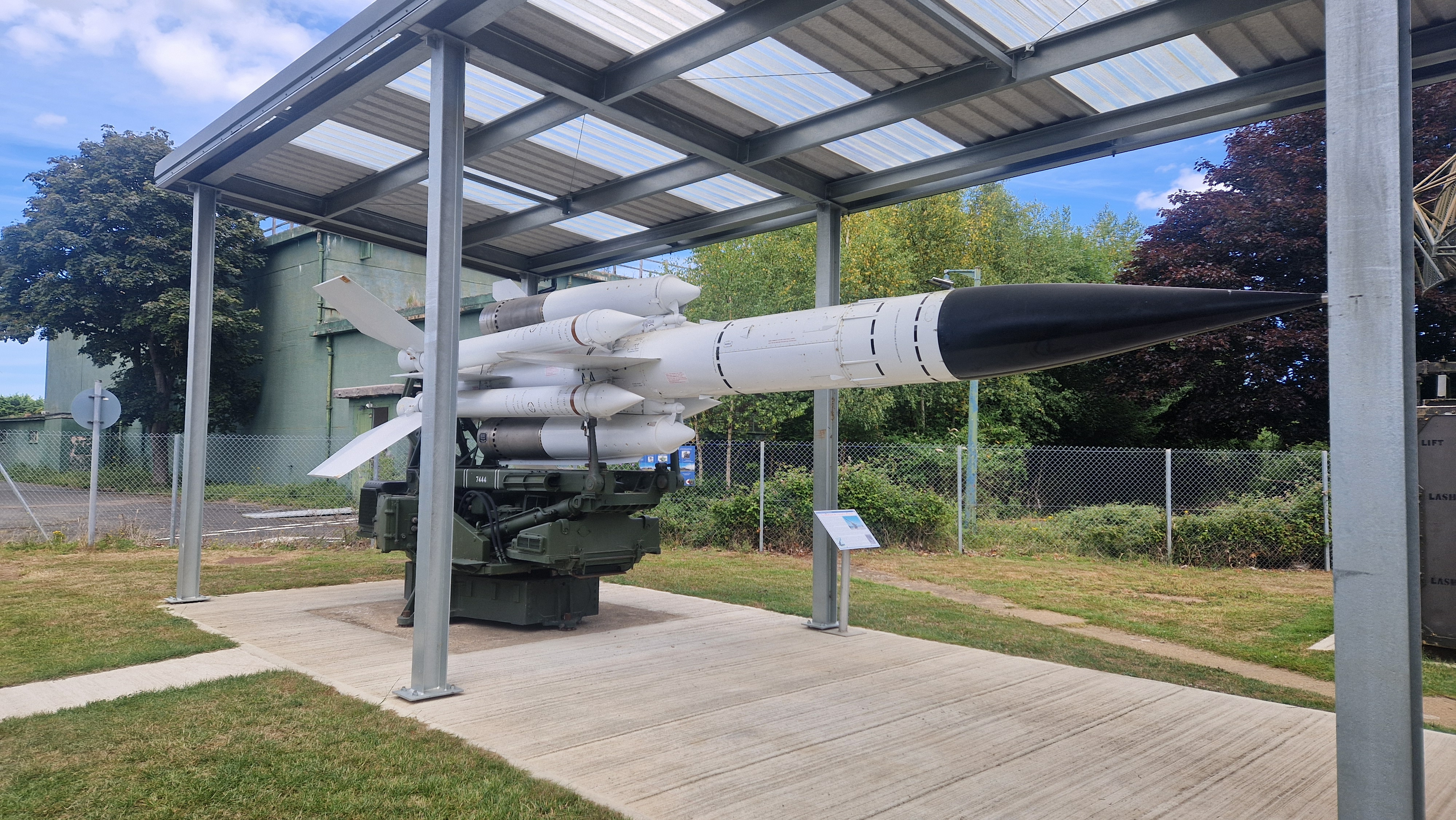
Bloodhound at RAF Air Defence Radar Museum

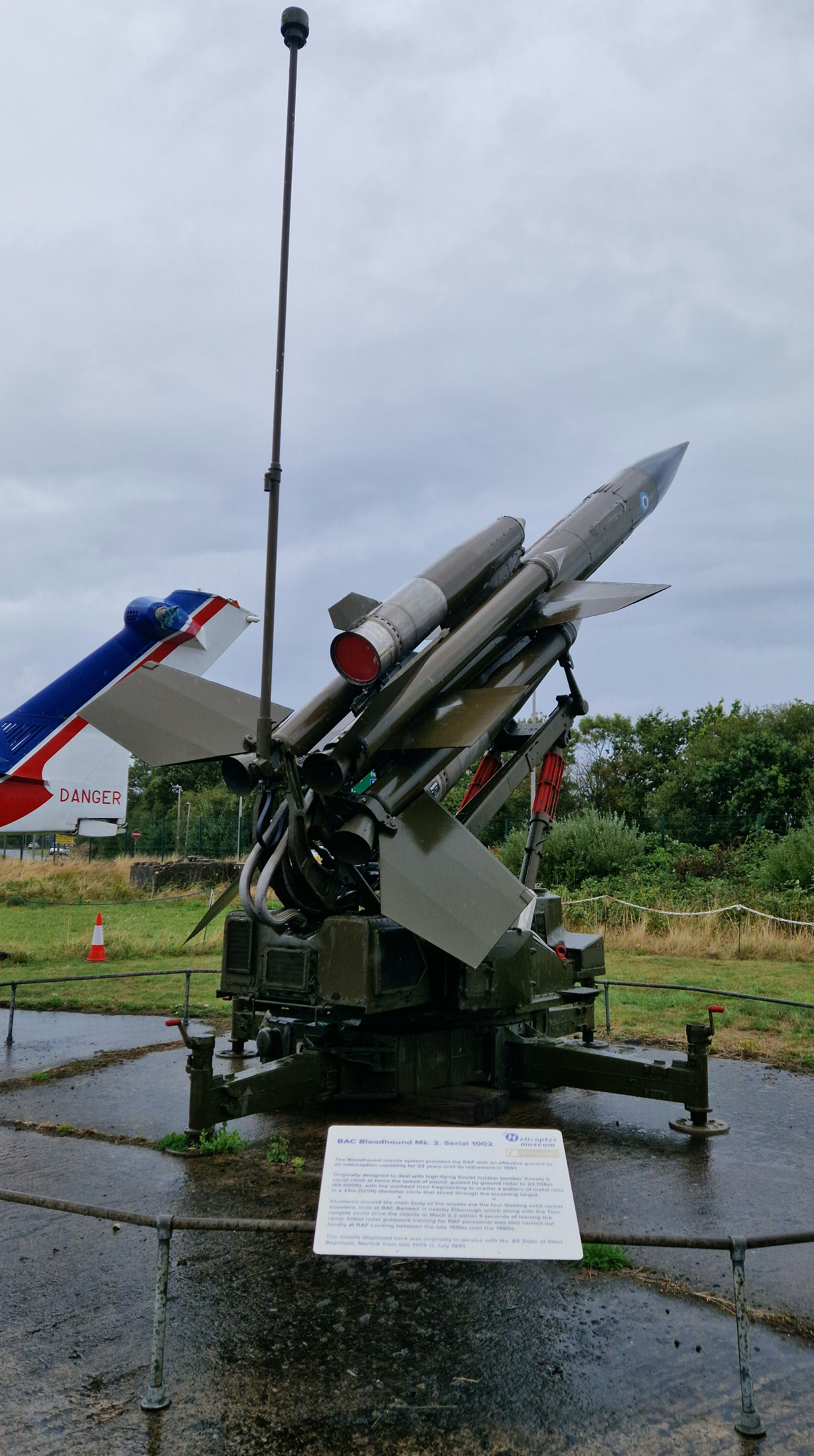
Bloodhound at The Helicopter Museum Weston-super-Mare.

Australia

- Fighter World Aviation Heritage Centre, RAAF Base Williamtown, New South Wales
- Classic Jets Fighter Museum, Parafield Airport, Adelaide
- Gate guardians at RAAF Base Darwin, Northern Territory
- RAAF Museum, Point Cook, Victoria
- Queensland Air Museum, Caloundra Airport, Caloundra, Queensland

Germany

- Royal Air Force (RAF) Museum Laarbruch. Weeze

Singapore

- Republic of Singapore Air Force Museum, Paya Lebar Air Base

Sweden

- Arboga Missile Museum
- Ängelholms Flygmuseum. Ängelholm
- Norrtäljes Luftvärnsmuseum Norrtälje Bloodhound Mk.1

Switzerland

- Flieger-Flab-Museum. Dübendorf
- Historical Bloodhound unit as Museum of the Militärhistorische Stiftung des Kantons Zug in Menzingen.
- Torny barracks, an ex Bloodhound launch site.

United Kingdom

- Aerospace Bristol (MkII)
- Bristol Industrial Museum (Bristol Thor engine components) (now closed)
- Imperial War Museum Duxford (MkII)
- Muckleburgh Collection, Weybourne, Norfolk (MkII)
- Norfolk and Suffolk Aviation Museum, Flixton, Suffolk
- North East Land, Sea and Air Museums, Sunderland Airport
- RAF Abingdon, Abingdon, Oxfordshire
- RAF Air Defence Radar Museum, RRH Neatishead, Norwich, Norfolk
- Royal Air Force Museum Midlands (MkII)
- Thorpe Camp, Woodhall Spa, Lincolnshire
- The Helicopter Museum, Weston-super-Mare (MkII) (previously at RAFM London)

== See also ==
- English Electric Thunderbird
- List of Rainbow Codes
