= Fairey Stooge =

Stooge
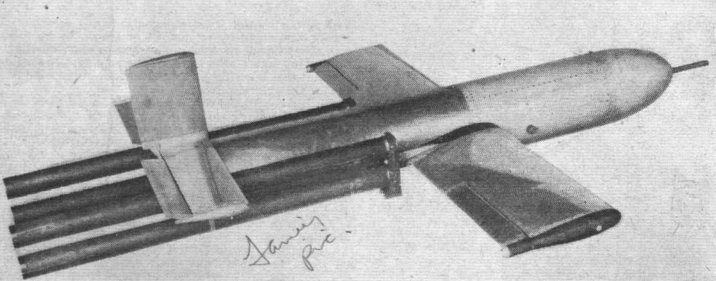
- Type: Surface-to-air missile
- Place of origin: United Kingdom

Production history
- Designed: 1944-1947
- Manufacturer: Fairey Aviation

Specifications
- Mass: 738 lb (335 kg)
- Length: 7 ft 5.5 in (2.273 m)
- Diameter: 12.5 in (320 mm)
- Wingspan: 6 ft 10 in (2.08 m)
- Engine: Main engine, 4 x 5 in (130 mm) "Swallow" rockets 75 lb_{f} (0.33 kN) each Boosters, 4 x RP-3 3 in (76 mm) rockets 5,600 lb_{f} (25 kN) total thrust
- Propellant: Solid fuel
- Boost time: 40 sec
- Maximum speed: 520 mph (840 km/h)
- Guidance system: Radio command

The Fairey Aviation Stooge was a command guided surface-to-air missile (SAM) development project carried out in the United Kingdom starting in World War II. Development dates to a British Army request from 1944, but the work was taken over by the Royal Navy as a potential counter to the Kamikaze threat. Development was not complete when the war ended, but the Ministry of Supply funded further development and numerous test launches into 1947, assisting in the development of more advanced successor missiles.

== Development ==
During World War II a number of efforts were started to develop surface-to-air missiles as it was generally considered that flak was of little use against bombers of ever-increasing performance. While the Germans developed a number of systems in an attempt to deter Allied bombing, the overwhelming air superiority held by the Allies meant that the prospect of developing similar weapons was largely ignored as unnecessary. This changed when the Kamikaze threat spread in the later half of 1944. This led to the British Stooge and Brakemine efforts, and the US Navy's SAM-N-2 Lark.

The British Army had already ordered early studies on these weapons. According to a common account of its development, possibly apocryphal, Fairey was asked to carry out some basic research on these plans by a Royal Navy request, but instead presented a revised design of some depth. The Ministry of Supply (MoS) signed a contract for development of the system in 1944. The ending of the war in August 1945 led to a lower level of urgency, but the MoS continued funding as a development project.

== Description ==
The Stooge was essentially a small subsonic aircraft with straight wings and a conventional tail layout. The missile looked substantially similar to the V-1, shrunken down and with the engine removed from the top. The missile fuselage was 7 ft 5.5 in (2.273 m) long and 12.5 in (320 mm) in diameter, with a main wingspan of 6 ft 10 in (2.08 m), and a tail span of 4 ft (1.2 m). Ready for launch, it weighed 738 lb (335 kg).

The rear part of the fuselage was taken up by four 5-inch (130 mm) air-to-ground "Swallow" solid fuel rockets. The thrust and burning time could be controlled by varying the size of a venturi nozzle. At 75 lbf (330 N) the missile reached speeds of 520 mph (840 km/h), but was normally tested at a thrust level of 40 lbf (180 N) which gave a much slower cruising speed.

For launch, four rocket motors (from the RP-3 "3-inch" rocket weapon) were strapped in pairs to either side of the fuselage, under the horizontal stabilizer. These produced 5,600 lbf (25,000 N) for 1.6 seconds, launching the missile off the 10 ft (3.0 m) long launching rail at an acceleration of 8g. As the booster rockets gave the missile a tail-heavy center of gravity, a cup-shaped counterweight was fitted to the nose. At booster burnout, the missile having reached a speed of over 265 mph (426 km/h), the boosters and counterweight were ejected and the main rockets fired.

Like many early missiles of the era, the Stooge was boosted to the approximate altitude of the attacker and then flown onto an intercept course. Flares located in fairings on the wing tips provided a bright source for the operator to track visually. After launch the missile levelled off and a simple gyroscope-controlled autopilot, located in the forwards portion of the fuselage, kept the Stooge flying in a straight line. Control of first the elevators and then, 3 seconds later, the ailerons were released to the operator - the delay necessary for the gyro control to stabilise first. Using radio control, the operator would fly the missile into a position in front of the target, and then adjust the path in order to collide with the target. Control was via the ailerons and elevator, the vertical stabilizer did not contain a movable rudder.

== Flight testing ==
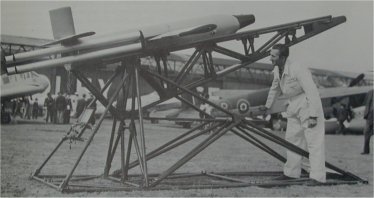
Stooge displayed on launcher

The first prototypes, with fixed controls, flew after seven months from the start of development at the end of World War II. Development continued with a number of test firings at the Rocket Experimental Establishment at RAF Aberporth at Aberporth, Wales. It is believed that around twelve Stooges were constructed by Fairey, the most successful of the test launches being that of the sixth missile, achieving an altitude of 1,600 feet (490 m) and a range of 3 miles (4.8 km) before the flight was terminated by range safety, the missile having passed out of sight of the operator.

The Stooge, on its launcher, was displayed at the Radlett Aerodrome in 1947. Radlett, northwest of London, was the site of a major Handley Page factory and host of early meetings of what would become the Farnborough Airshow.

Although the programme failed to yield an operational weapons system, experience gained from the testing of Stooge assisted in the development of the Fairey Fireflash air-to-air missile.

== See also ==
- Brakemine, another early UK missile using beam riding guidance rather than radio control
