= Surface-to-air missile =

Ground-launched missile designed to attack aerial targets

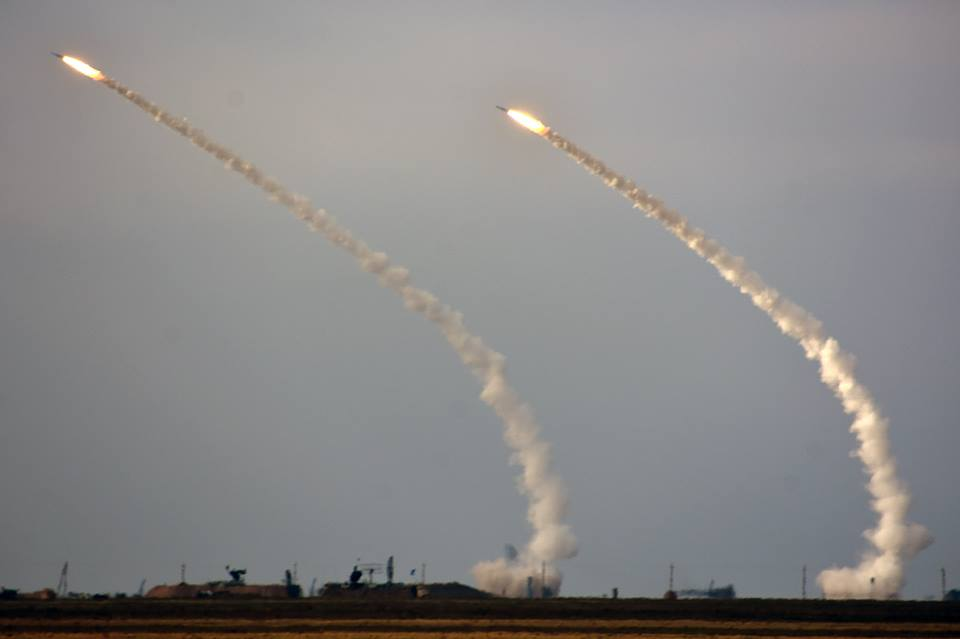
A pair of S-300 missiles being launched in Ukraine

A surface-to-air missile (SAM), also known as a ground-to-air missile (GTAM) or surface-to-air guided weapon (SAGW), is a missile designed to be launched from the ground or the sea to destroy aircraft or other missiles. It is one type of anti-aircraft system; in modern armed forces, missiles have replaced most other forms of dedicated anti-aircraft weapons, with anti-aircraft guns pushed into specialized roles.

World War II saw the initial development of SAMs, yet no system became operational. Further development in the 1940s and 1950s led to operational systems being introduced by most major forces during the second half of the 1950s. Smaller systems, suitable for close-range work, evolved through the 1960s and 1970s, to modern systems that are man-portable. Shipborne systems followed the evolution of land-based models, starting with long-range weapons and steadily evolving toward smaller designs to provide a layered defence. This evolution of design increasingly pushed gun-based systems into the shortest-range roles.

The American Nike Ajax was the first operational SAM system, and the Soviet Union's S-75 Dvina was the most-produced SAM system. Widely used modern examples include the Patriot and S-300 wide-area systems, SM-6 and MBDA Aster Missile naval missiles, and short-range man-portable systems like the Stinger and 9K38 Igla.

== History ==
The first known idea for a guided surface-to-air missile was in 1925, when a beam riding system was proposed whereby a rocket would follow a searchlight beam onto a target. A selenium cell was mounted on the tip of each of the rocket's four tail fins, with the cells facing backwards. When one selenium cell was no longer in the light beam, it would be steered in the opposite direction back into the beam. The first historical mention of a concept and design of a surface-to-air missile in which a drawing was presented, was by inventor Gustav Rasmus in 1931, who proposed a design that would home in on the sound of an aircraft's engines.

=== World War II ===
During World War II, efforts were started to develop surface-to-air missiles as it was generally considered that flak was of little use against bombers of ever-increasing performance. The lethal radius of a flak shell is fairly small, and the chance of delivering a "hit" is essentially a fixed percentage per round. In order to attack a target, guns fire continually while the aircraft are in range in order to launch as many shells as possible, increasing the chance that one of these will end up within the lethal range. Against the Boeing B-17, which operated just within the range of the numerous German eighty-eights, an average of 2,805 rounds had to be fired per bomber destroyed.

Bombers flying at higher altitudes require larger guns and shells to reach them. This greatly increases the cost of the system, and (generally) slows the rate of fire. Faster aircraft fly out of range more quickly, reducing the number of rounds fired against them. Against late-war designs like the Boeing B-29 Superfortress or jet-powered designs like the Arado Ar 234, flak would be essentially useless. This potential was already obvious by 1942, when Walther von Axthelm outlined the growing problems with flak defences that he predicted would soon be dealing with "aircraft speeds and flight altitudes [that] will gradually reach 1,000 km/h (620 mph) and between 10,000–15,000 m (33,000–49,000 ft)." (Note: This is a quote-of-a-quote and the original source is not available. Axthelm almost certainly stated these numbers in metric terms.) This was seen generally; in November 1943 the Director of Gunnery Division of the Royal Navy concluded that guns would be useless against jets, stating "No projectile of which control is lost when it leaves the ship can be of any use to us in this matter."

==== Axis efforts ====
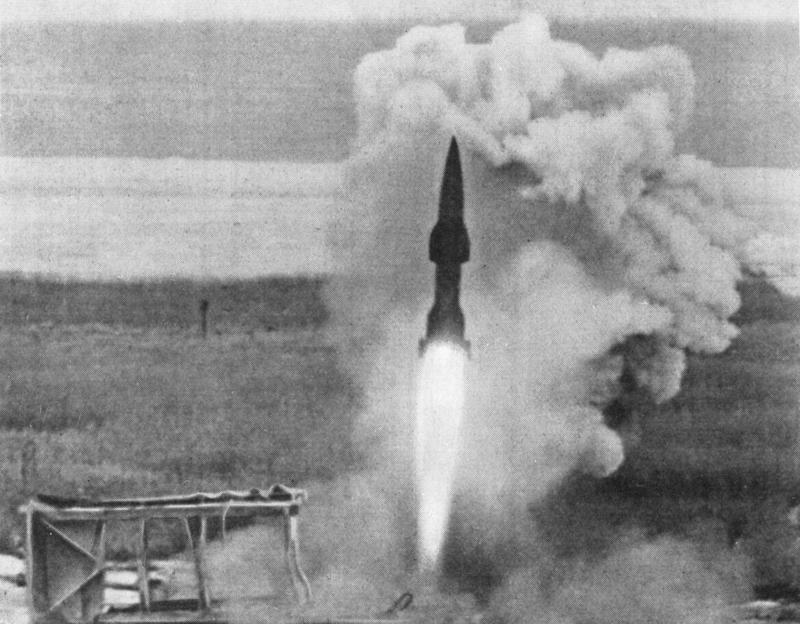
A Wasserfall missile lifts off during a test flight.

The first serious consideration of a SAM development project was a series of conversations that took place in Germany during 1941. In February, Friederich Halder proposed a "flak rocket" concept, which led Walter Dornberger to ask Wernher von Braun to prepare a study on a guided missile able to reach between 15,000 and 18,000 m (49,000 and 59,000 ft) altitude. Von Braun became convinced a better solution was a crewed rocket interceptor, and said as much to the director of the T-Amt, Roluf Lucht, in July. The directors of the Luftwaffe flak arm were not interested in crewed aircraft, and the resulting disagreements between the teams delayed serious consideration of a SAM for two years.

Von Axthelm published his concerns in 1942, and the subject saw serious consideration for the first time; initial development programs for liquid- and solid-fuel rockets became part of the Flak Development Program of 1942. By this point serious studies by the Peenemünde team had been prepared, and several rocket designs had been proposed, including 1940's Feuerlilie, and 1941's Wasserfall and Henschel Hs 117 Schmetterling. None of these projects saw any real development until 1943, when the first large-scale raids by the Allied air forces started. As the urgency of the problem grew, new designs were added, including Enzian and Rheintochter, as well as the unguided Taifun which was designed to be launched in waves.

In general, these designs could be split into two groups. One set of designs would be boosted to altitude in front of the bombers and then flown towards them on a head-on approach at low speeds comparable to crewed aircraft. These designs included the Feuerlilie, Schmetterling and Enzian. The second group were high-speed missiles, typically supersonic, that flew directly towards their targets from below. These included Wasserfall and Rheintochter. Both types used radio control for guidance, either by eye, or by comparing the returns of the missile and target on a single radar screen. Development of all these systems was carried out at the same time, and the war ended before any of them was ready for combat use. The infighting between various groups in the military also delayed development. Some extreme fighter designs, like the Komet and Natter, also overlapped with SAMs in their intended uses.

Albert Speer was especially supportive of missile development. In his opinion, had they been consistently developed from the start, the large scale bomber raids of 1944 would have been impossible.

==== Allied efforts ====
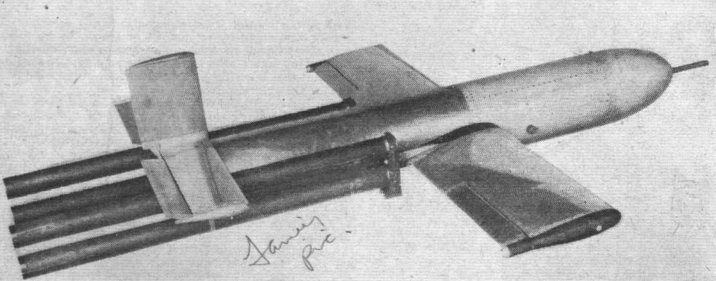
Typical of the "boost-glide" type weapons, the Fairey Stooge was an armed drone aircraft flown to a collision with the target. Enzian and Schmetterling were similar in concept, design and performance.

The British developed unguided antiaircraft rockets (operated under the name Z Battery) close to the start of World War II, but the air superiority usually held by the Allies meant that the demand for similar weapons was not as acute.

When several Allied ships were sunk in 1943 by Henschel Hs 293 and Fritz X glide bombs, Allied interest changed. These weapons were released from stand-off distances, with the bomber remaining outside the range of the ship's antiaircraft guns, and the missiles themselves were too small and fast to be attacked effectively.

To combat this threat, the U.S. Navy launched Operation Bumblebee to develop a ramjet-powered missile to destroy the launching aircraft at long range. The initial performance goal was to target an intercept at a horizontal range of 10 miles (16 km) and 30,000 feet (9,100 m) altitude, with a 300 to 600 pounds (140 to 270 kg) warhead for a 30 to 60 percent kill probability. This weapon did not emerge for 16 years, when it entered operation as the RIM-8 Talos.

Heavy shipping losses to kamikaze attacks during the Liberation of the Philippines and the Battle of Okinawa provided additional incentive for guided missile development. This led to the British Fairey Stooge and Brakemine efforts, and the U.S. Navy's SAM-N-2 Lark. The Lark ran into considerable difficulty and it never entered operational use. The end of the war led to the British efforts being used strictly for research and development throughout their lifetime.

=== Post-war deployments ===
The Nike Hercules Story (1960) de-classified official Nike Hercules and Ajax information film reel.

In the immediate post-war era, SAM developments were under way around the world, with several of these entering service in the early- and mid-1950s.

Ready Now And Ready For Tomorrow (1968) de-classified US Navy naval anti-aircraft warfare promotional film reel.

Coming to the same conclusions as the Germans regarding flak, the U.S. Army started its Project Nike developments in 1944. Led by Bell Labs, the Nike Ajax was tested in production form in 1952, becoming the first operational SAM system when it was activated in March 1954. Concerns about Ajax's ability to deal with formations of aircraft led to greatly updated version of the same basic design entering service in 1958 as the Nike Hercules, the first nuclear-armed SAM. The U.S. Army Air Forces had also considered collision-course weapons (like the German radio-controlled concepts) and launched Project Thumper in 1946. This was merged with another project, Wizard, and emerged as the CIM-10 Bomarc in 1959. The Bomarc had a range of over 500 km, but it was quite expensive and somewhat unreliable. Development of Oerlikon's RSD 58 started in 1947, and was a closely held secret until 1955. Early versions of the missile were available for purchase as early as 1952, but never entered operational service. The RSD 58 used beam riding guidance, which has limited performance against high-speed aircraft, as the missile is unable to "lead" the target to a collision point. Examples were purchased by several nations for testing and training purposes, but no operational sales were made.

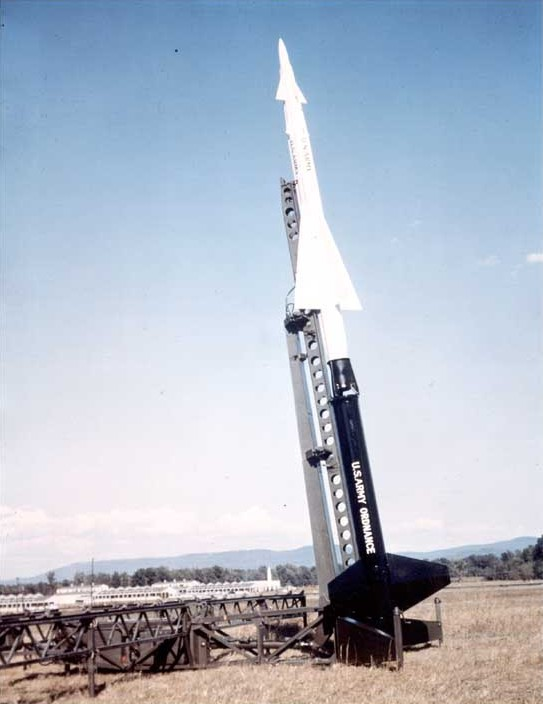
Nike Ajax was the first operational SAM system.

The Soviet Union began development of a SAM system in earnest with the opening of the Cold War. Joseph Stalin was worried that Moscow would be subjected to American and British air raids, like those against Berlin, and, in 1951, he demanded that a missile system to counter a 900 bomber raid be built as quickly as possible. This led to the S-25 Berkut system (NATO reporting name: SA-1 "Guild"), which was designed, developed and deployed in a rush program. Early units entered operational service on 7 May 1955, and the entire system ringing Moscow was completely activated by June 1956. The system failed, however, to detect, track, and intercept the only overflight of the Soviet capital Moscow by a U-2 reconnaissance plane on July 5, 1956. The S-25 was a static system, but efforts were also put into a smaller design that would be much more mobile. This emerged in 1957 as the famous S-75 Dvina (SA-2 "Guideline"), a portable system, with very high performance, that remained in operation into the 2000s. The Soviet Union remained at the forefront of SAM development throughout its history; and Russia has followed suit.

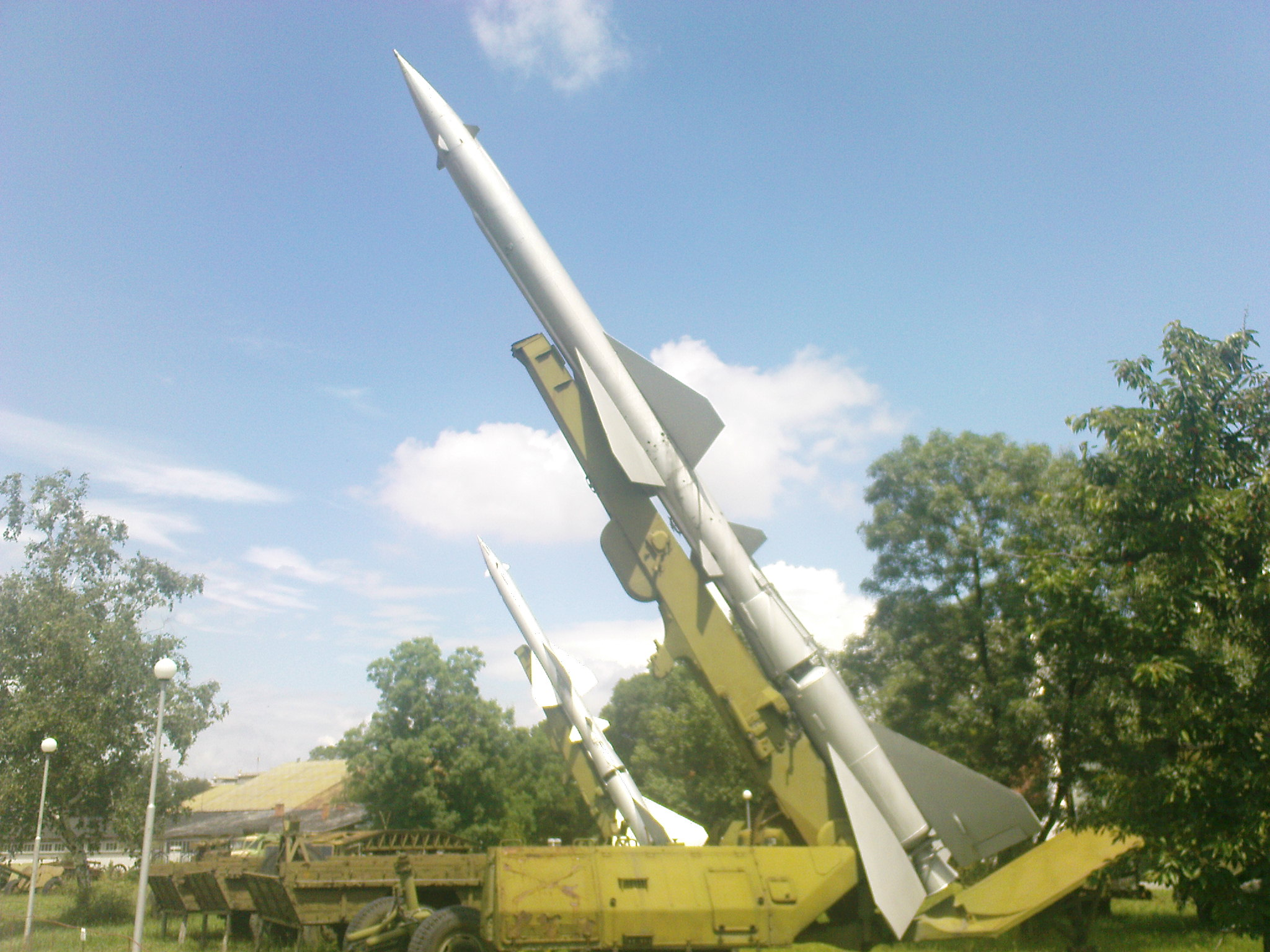
SA-2 Guideline surface-to-air missiles, one of the most widely deployed SAM systems in the world.

The early British developments with Stooge and Brakemine were successful, but further development was curtailed in the post-war era. These efforts picked up again with the opening of the Cold War, following the "Stage Plan" of improving UK air defences with new radars, fighters and missiles. Two competing designs were proposed for "Stage 1", based on common radar and control units, and these emerged as the RAF's Bristol Bloodhound in 1958, and the Army's English Electric Thunderbird in 1959. A third design followed the American Bumblebee efforts in terms of role and timeline, and entered service in 1961 as the Sea Slug.

=== War in Vietnam ===
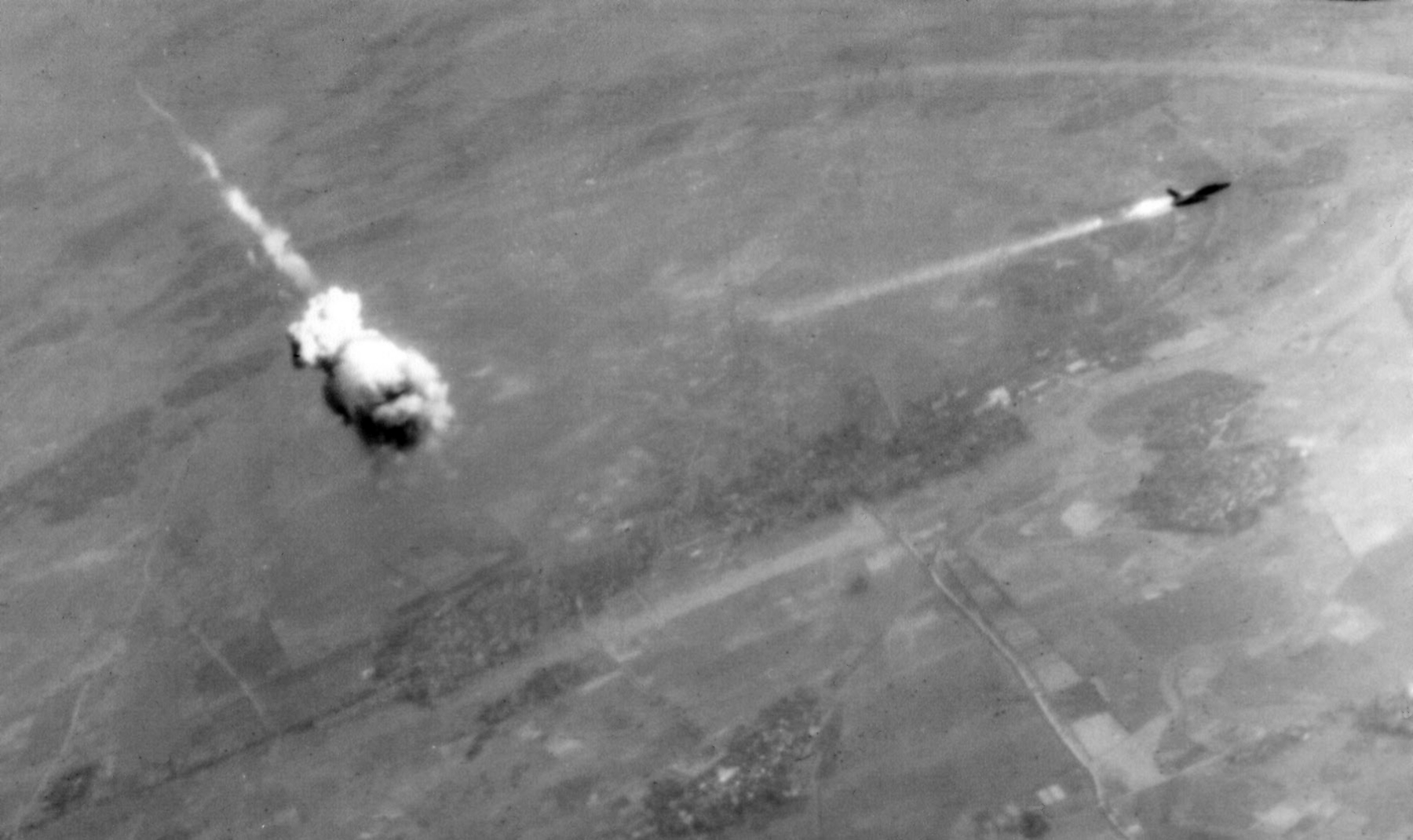
A moment after an S-75 Dvina (SA-2) hits an F-105 over North Vietnam, the fighter-bomber starts to spew flame.

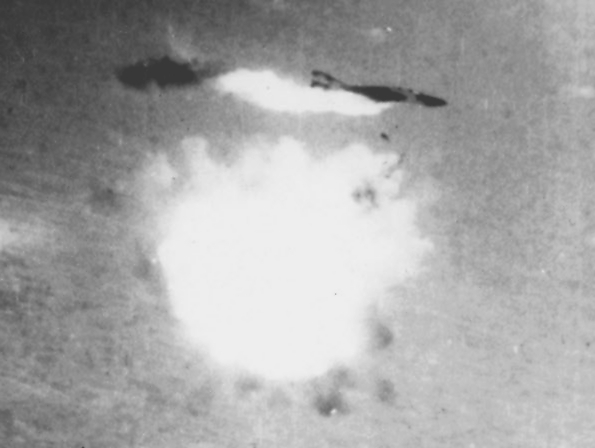
An S-75 detonates directly below an RF-4C reconnaissance plane. The crew ejected and were taken captive.

The Vietnam War was the first modern war in which guided anti-aircraft missiles seriously challenged highly advanced supersonic jet aircraft. It would also be the first and only time that the latest and most modern air defense technologies of the Soviet Union and the most modern jet fighter planes and bombers of the United States confronted each other in combat (if one does not count the Yom Kippur War wherein IAF was challenged by Syrian SA-3s).

The USAF responded to this threat with increasingly effective means. Early efforts to directly attack the missiles sites as part of Operation Spring High and Operation Iron Hand were generally unsuccessful, but the introduction of Wild Weasel aircraft carrying Shrike missiles and the Standard ARM missile changed the situation dramatically. Feint and counterfeint followed as each side introduced new tactics to try to gain the upper hand. By the time of Operation Linebacker II in 1972, the Americans had gained critical information about the performance and operations of the S-75 (via Arab S-75 systems captured by Israel), and used these missions as a way to demonstrate the capability of strategic bombers to operate in a SAM saturated environment. Their first missions appeared to demonstrate the exact opposite, with the loss of three B-52s and several others damaged in a single mission. Dramatic changes followed, and by the end of the series, missions were carried out with additional chaff, ECM, Iron Hand, and other changes that dramatically changed the score. By the conclusion of the Linebacker II campaign, the shootdown rate of the S-75 against the B-52s was 7.52% (15 B-52s were shot down, 5 B-52s were heavily damaged for 266 missiles)

During the war, The Soviet Union supplied 7,658 SAMs to North Vietnam, and their defense forces conducted about 5,800 launches, usually in multiples of three. By the war's end, the U.S. lost a total of 3,374 aircraft in combat operations. According to the North Vietnamese, 31% were shot down by S-75 missiles (1,046 aircraft, or 5.6 missiles per one kill); 60% were shot down by anti-aircraft guns; and 9% were shot down by MiG fighters. The S-75 missile system significantly improved the effectiveness of North Vietnamese anti-aircraft artillery, which used data from S-75 radar stations However, the U.S. states only 205 of those aircraft were lost to North Vietnamese surface-to-air missiles.

=== Smaller, faster ===
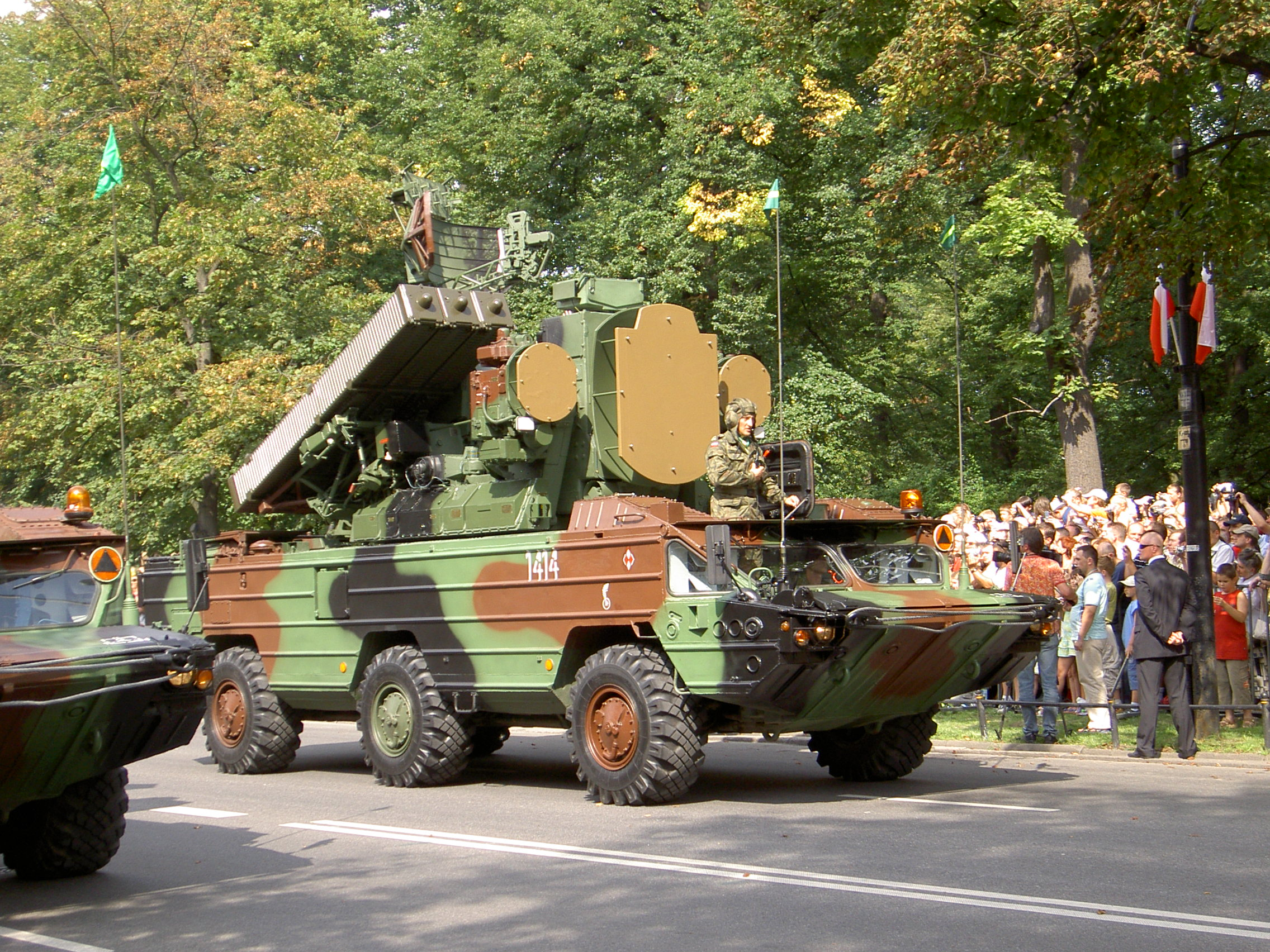
The Osa was the first system to include search, track and missiles all on a single mobile platform.

Video of launch of Poliment-Redut naval SAM

All of these early systems were "heavyweight" designs with limited mobility and requiring considerable set-up time. However, they were also increasingly effective. By the early 1960s, the deployment of SAMs had rendered high-speed high-altitude flight in combat practically suicidal. (Note: The introduction of effective SAMs led to the cancellation of the B-70 bomber, and the prohibition of crewed reconnaissance flights over the Soviet Union.) The way to avoid this was to fly lower, below the line-of-sight of missile's radar systems. This demanded very different aircraft, like the F-111, TSR-2, and Panavia Tornado.

Consequently, SAMs evolved rapidly in the 1960s. As their targets were now being forced to fly lower due to the presence of the larger missiles, engagements would necessarily be at short ranges, and occur quickly. Shorter ranges meant the missiles could be much smaller, which aided them in terms of mobility. By the mid-1960s, almost all modern armed forces had short-range missiles mounted on trucks or light armour that could move with the armed forces they protected. Examples include the 2K12 Kub (SA-6) and 9K33 Osa (SA-8), MIM-23 Hawk, Rapier, Roland and Crotale.

The introduction of sea-skimming missiles in the late 1960s and 1970s led to additional mid- and short-range designs for defence against these targets. The UK's Sea Cat was an early example that was designed specifically to replace the Bofors 40 mm gun on its mount, and became the first operational point-defense SAM. The American RIM-7 Sea Sparrow quickly proliferated into a wide variety of designs fielded by most navies. Many of these are adapted from earlier mobile designs, but the special needs of the naval role has resulted in the continued existence of many custom missiles.

=== MANPADS ===
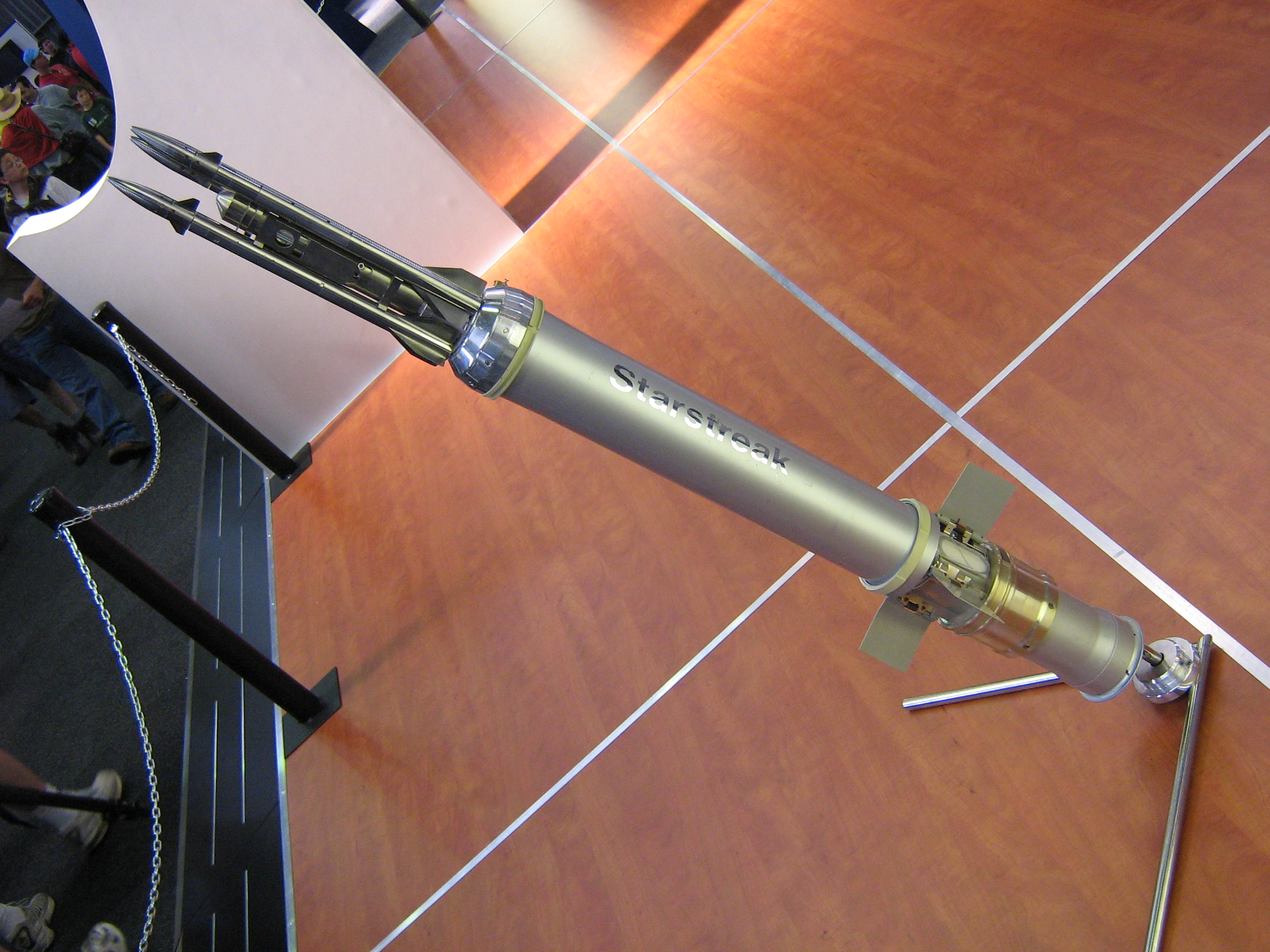
Starstreak laser-guided surface-to-air missile of the British Army

As aircraft moved ever lower, and missile performance continued to improve, eventually it became possible to build an effective man-portable anti-aircraft missile. Known as a "man-portable air-defense system" ("MANPADS"), the first example was a Royal Navy system known as the Holman Projector, used as a last-ditch weapon on smaller ships. The Germans also produced a similar short-range weapon known as Fliegerfaust, but it entered operation only on a very limited scale. The performance gap between this weapon and jet fighters of the post-war era was so great that such designs would not be effective.

By the 1960s, technology had closed this gap to a degree, leading to the introduction of the FIM-43 Redeye, SA-7 Grail and Blowpipe. Rapid improvement in the 1980s led to second generation designs, like the FIM-92 Stinger, 9K34 Strela-3 (SA-14), Igla-1 and Starstreak, with dramatically improved performance. By the 1990s to the 2010s, the Chinese had developed designs drawing influence from these, notably the FN-6 and the QW series.

Through the evolution of SAMs, improvements were also being made to anti-aircraft artillery, but the missiles pushed them into ever shorter-range roles. By the 1980s, the only remaining widespread use was point-defense of airfields and ships, especially against cruise missiles. By the 1990s, even these roles were being encroached on by new MANPADS and similar short-range weapons, like the RIM-116 Rolling Airframe Missile.

== General information ==
Surface-to-air missiles are classified by their guidance, mobility, altitude and range.

=== Mobility, maneuverability and range ===
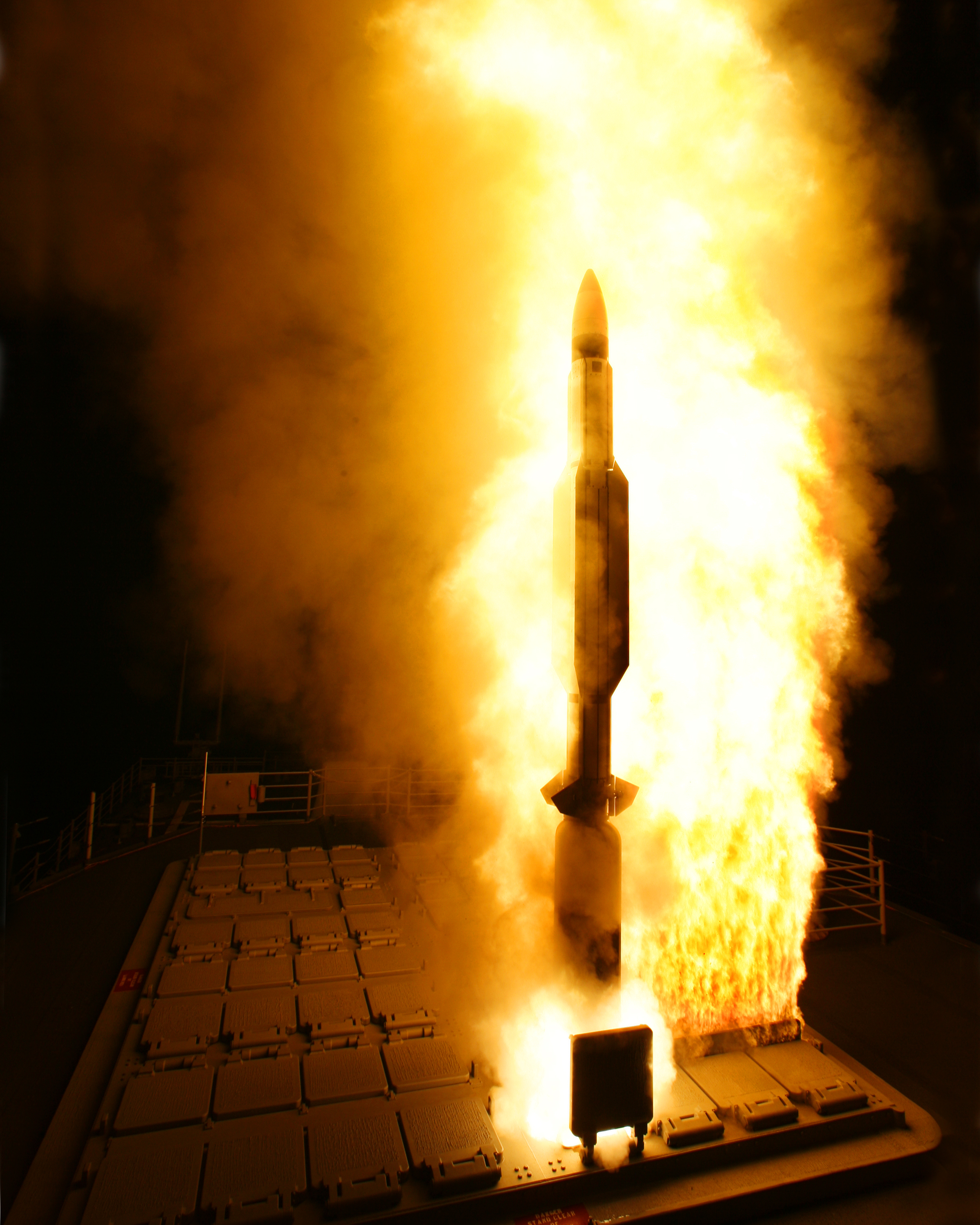
Long-range SAMs like the RIM-161 are an important part of modern naval forces.

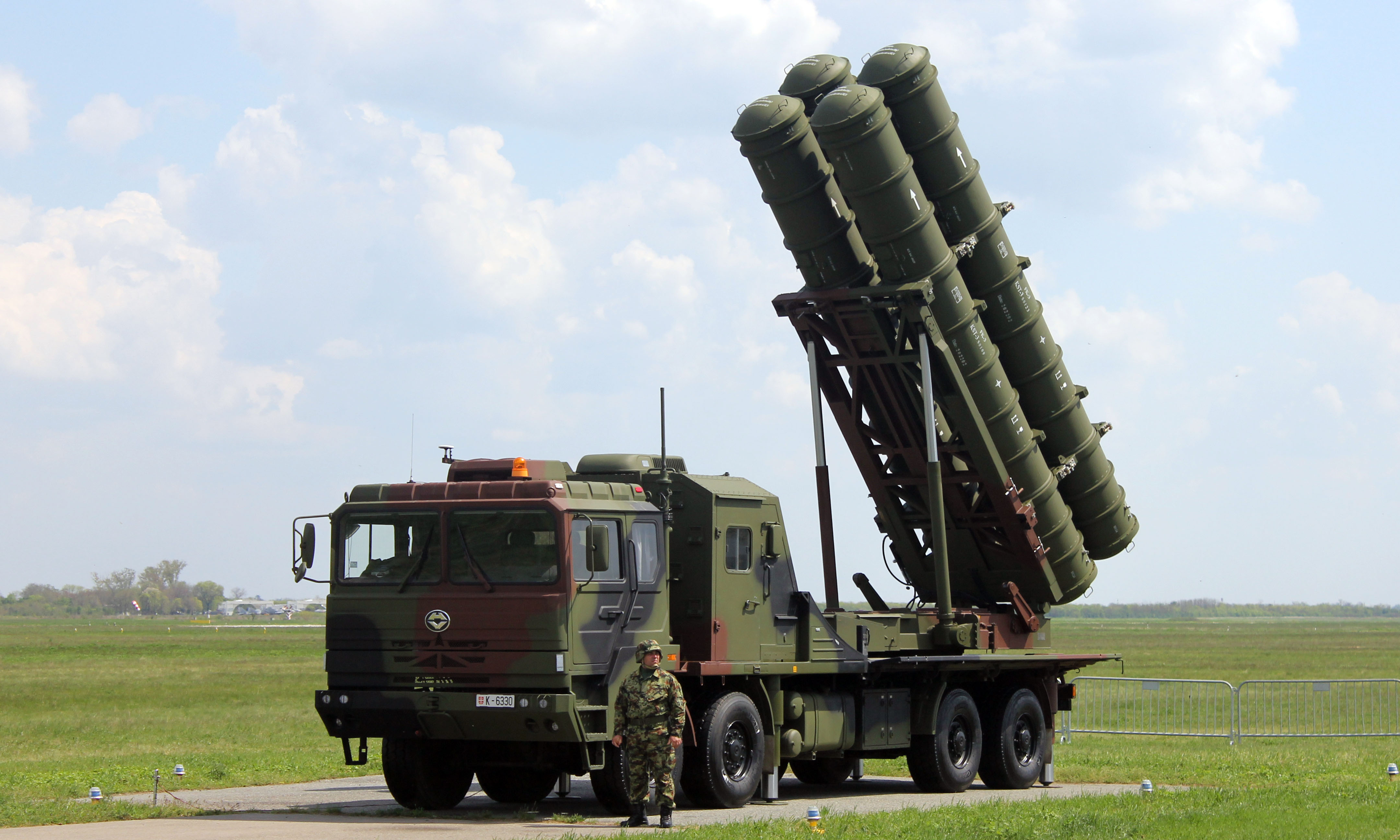
FK-3, the export version of the Chinese HQ-22 system of the Serbian Air Force and Air Defence

Missiles able to fly longer distances are generally heavier, and therefore less mobile. This leads to three "natural" classes of SAM systems; heavy long-range systems that are fixed or semi-mobile, medium-range vehicle-mounted systems that can fire on the move, and short-range man-portable air-defense systems (MANPADS).

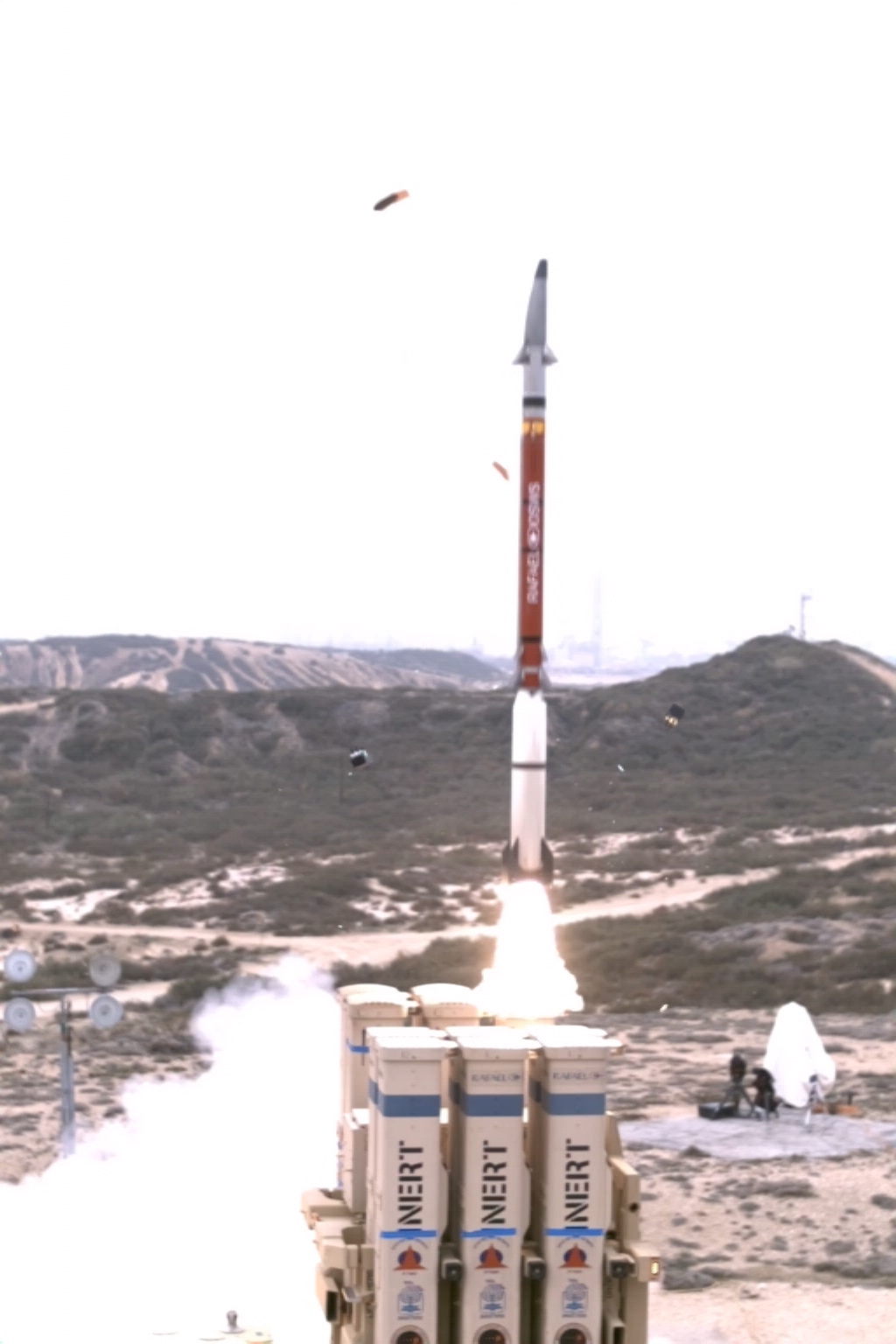
The David's Sling Stunner missile is designed for super-maneuverability. A three-pulse motor activates only during the kill-stage, providing additional acceleration and maneuverability.

Modern long-range weapons include the MIM-104 Patriot and S-300 systems, which have effective ranges on the order of 150 km (93 mi) and offer relatively good mobility and short unlimbering times. These compare with older systems with similar or less range, like the MIM-14 Nike Hercules or S-75 Dvina, which required fixed sites of considerable size. Much of this performance increase is due to improved rocket fuels and ever-smaller electronics in the guidance systems. Some very long-range systems remain, notably the Russian S-400, which has a range of 400 km (250 mi).

Medium-range designs, like the Rapier and 2K12 Kub, are specifically designed to be highly mobile with very fast, or zero, setup times. Many of these designs were mounted on armoured vehicles, allowing them to keep pace with mobile operations in a conventional war. Once a major group unto itself, medium-range designs have seen less development since the 1990s, as the focus has changed to unconventional warfare.

Developments have also been made in onboard maneuverability. Israel's David's Sling Stunner missile is designed to intercept the newest generation of tactical ballistic missiles at low altitude. The multi-stage interceptor consists of a solid-fuel, rocket motor booster, followed by an asymmetrical kill vehicle with advanced steering for super-maneuverability during the kill-stage. A three-pulse motor provides additional acceleration and maneuverability during the terminal phase.

MANPAD systems first developed in the 1960s and proved themselves in battle during the 1970s. MANPADS normally have ranges on the order of 3 km (1.9 mi) and are effective against attack helicopters and aircraft making ground attacks. Against fixed wing aircraft, they can be very effective, forcing them to fly outside the missile's envelope and thereby greatly reducing their effectiveness in ground-attack roles. MANPAD systems are sometimes used with vehicle mounts to improve maneuverability, like the Avenger system. These systems have encroached on the performance niche formerly filled by dedicated mid-range systems.

Ship-based anti-aircraft missiles are also considered to be SAMs, although in practice it is expected that they would be more widely used against sea skimming missiles rather than aircraft. Virtually all surface warships can be armed with SAMs, and naval SAMs are a necessity for all front-line surface warships. Some warship types specialize in anti-air warfare e.g. Ticonderoga-class cruisers equipped with the Aegis combat system or Kirov-class cruisers with the S-300F Fort missile system. Modern Warships may carry all three types (from long-range to short-range) of SAMs as a part of their multi-layered air defence.

=== Guidance systems ===
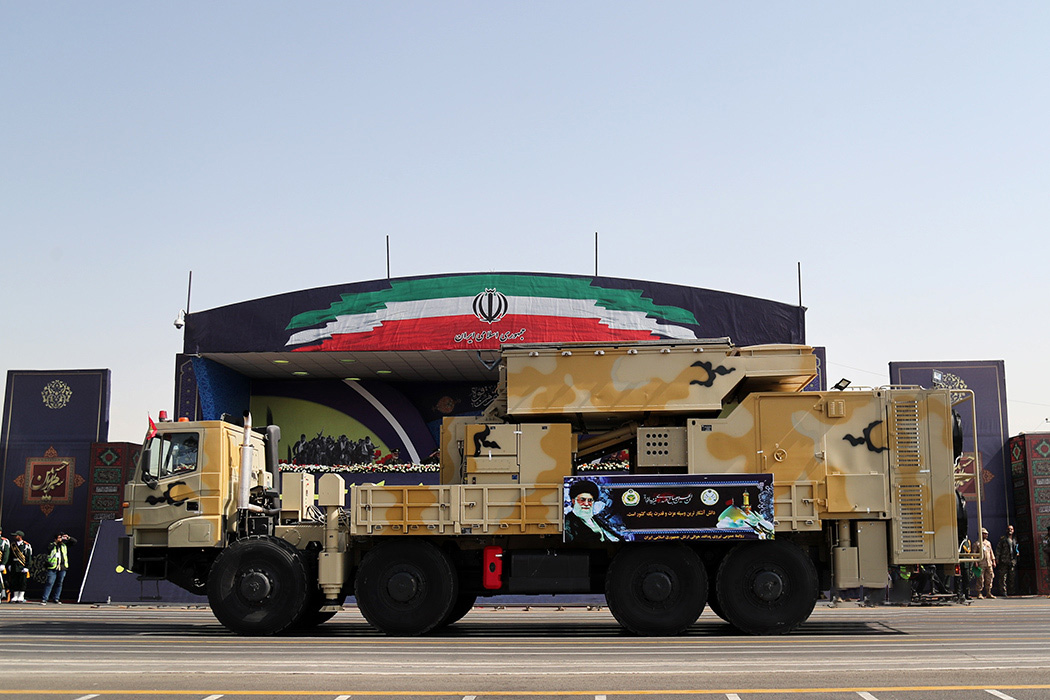
Fire control radar of Iranian Bavar 373 SAM system

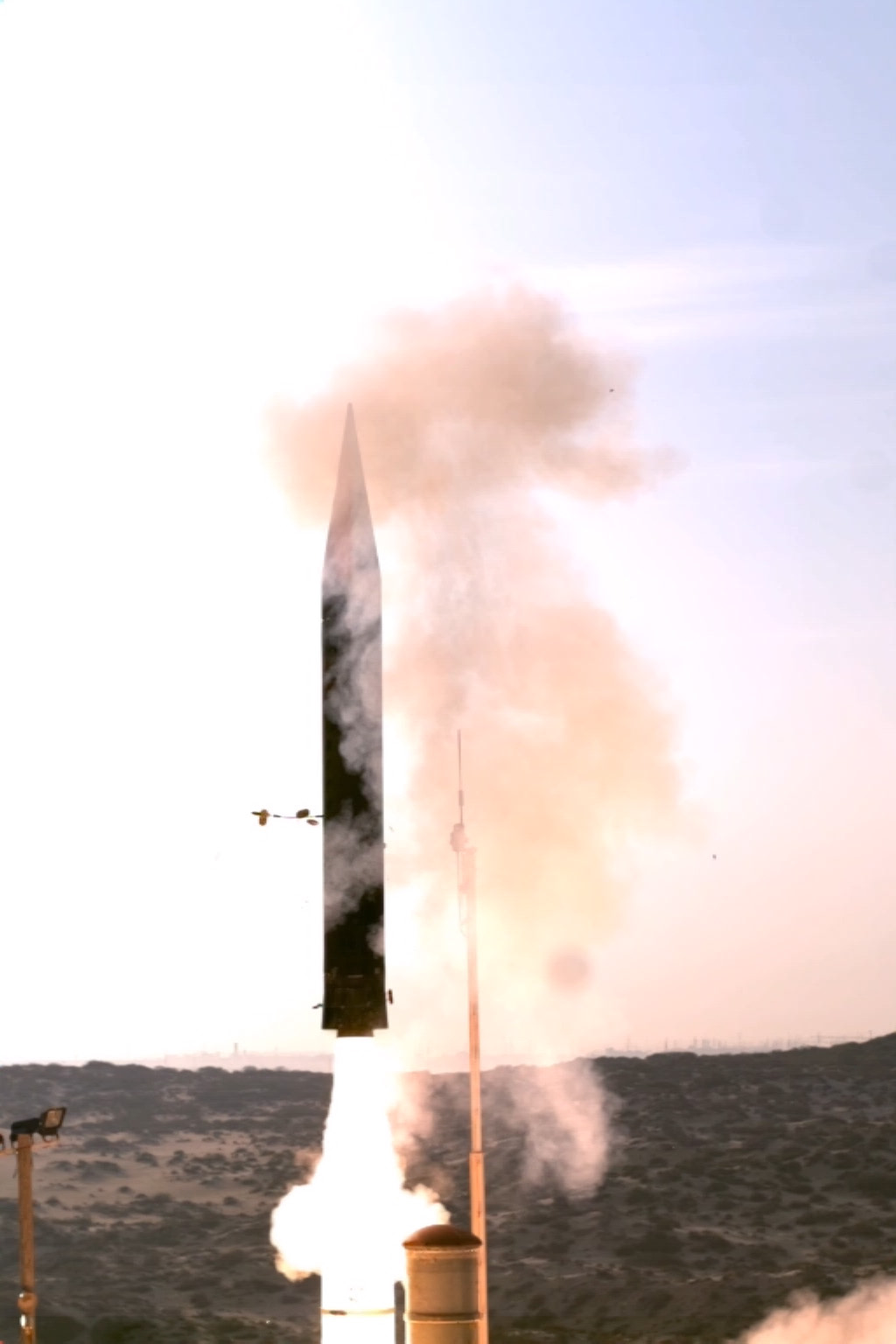
Israel's Arrow 3 missiles use a gimbaled seeker for hemispheric coverage. By measuring the seeker's line-of-sight propagation relative to the vehicle's motion, they use proportional navigation to divert their course and line up exactly with the target's flight path.

SAM systems generally fall into two broad groups based on their guidance systems, those using radar and those using some other means.

Longer range missiles generally use radar for early detection and guidance. Early SAM systems generally used tracking radars and fed guidance information to the missile using radio control concepts, referred to in the field as command guidance. Through the 1960s, the semi-active radar homing (SARH) concept became much more common. In SARH, the reflections of the tracking radar's broadcasts are picked up by a receiver in the missile, which homes in on this signal. SARH has the advantage of leaving most of the equipment on the ground, while also eliminating the need for the ground station to communicate with the missile after launch.

Smaller missiles, especially MANPADS, generally use infrared homing guidance systems. These have the advantage of being "fire-and-forget", once launched they will home on the target on their own with no external signals needed. In comparison, SARH systems require the tracking radar to illuminate the target, which may require them to be exposed through the attack. Systems combining an infrared seeker as a terminal guidance system on a missile using SARH are also known, like the MIM-46 Mauler, but these are generally rare.

Some newer short-range systems use a variation of the SARH technique, but based on laser illumination instead of radar. These have the advantage of being small and very fast acting, as well as highly accurate. A few older designs use purely optical tracking and command guidance, perhaps the best known example of this is the British Rapier system, which was initially an all-optical system with high accuracy.

All SAM systems from the smallest to the largest generally include identified as friend or foe (IFF) systems to help identify the target before being engaged. While IFF is not as important with MANPADs, as the target is almost always visually identified prior to launch, most modern MANPADs do include it.

=== Target acquisition ===
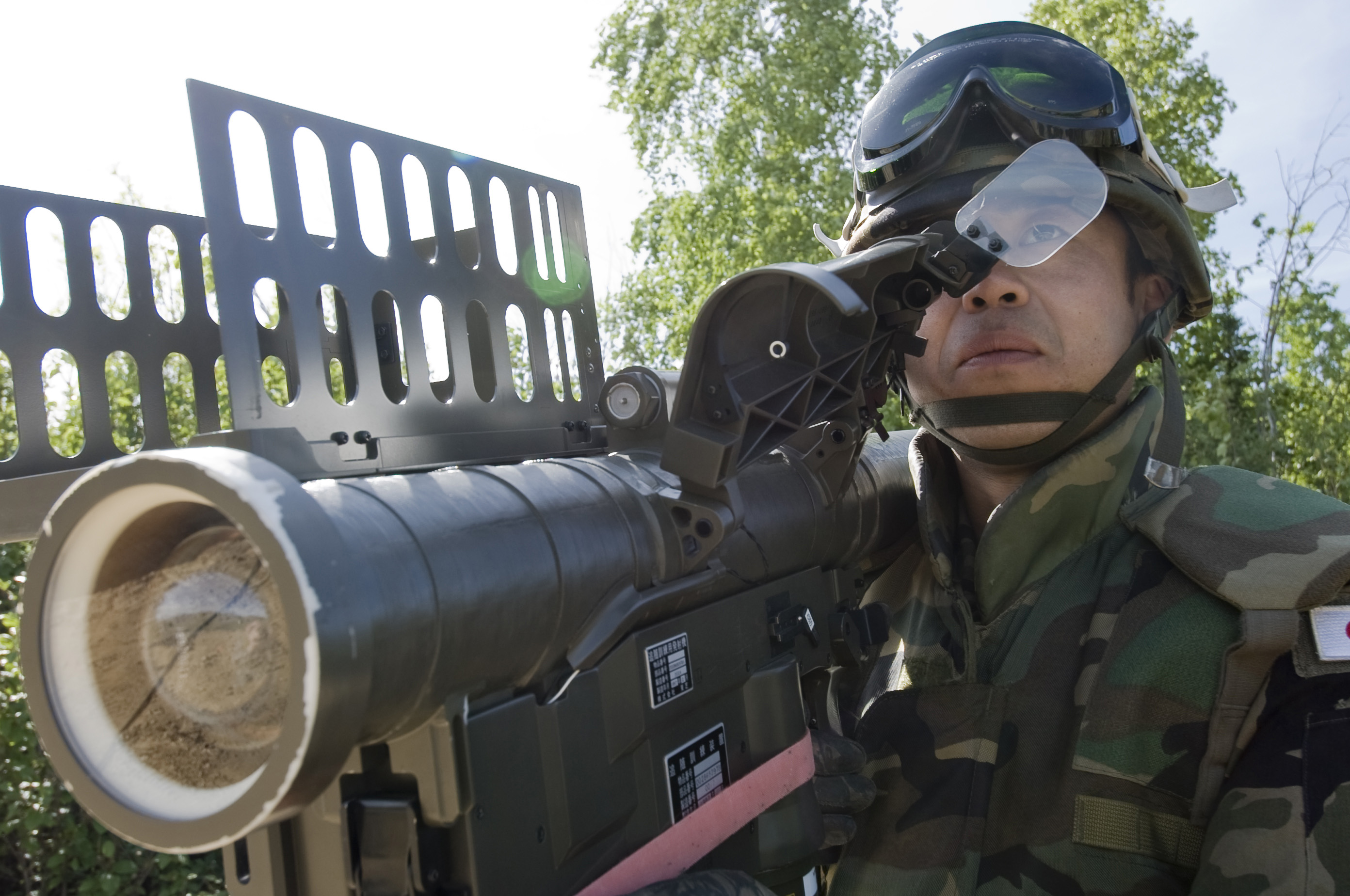
A JASDF soldier uses the optical sight on the Type 91 Kai MANPADS to acquire a mock airborne target. The prominent vertical metal devices on the left are the IFF antennas.

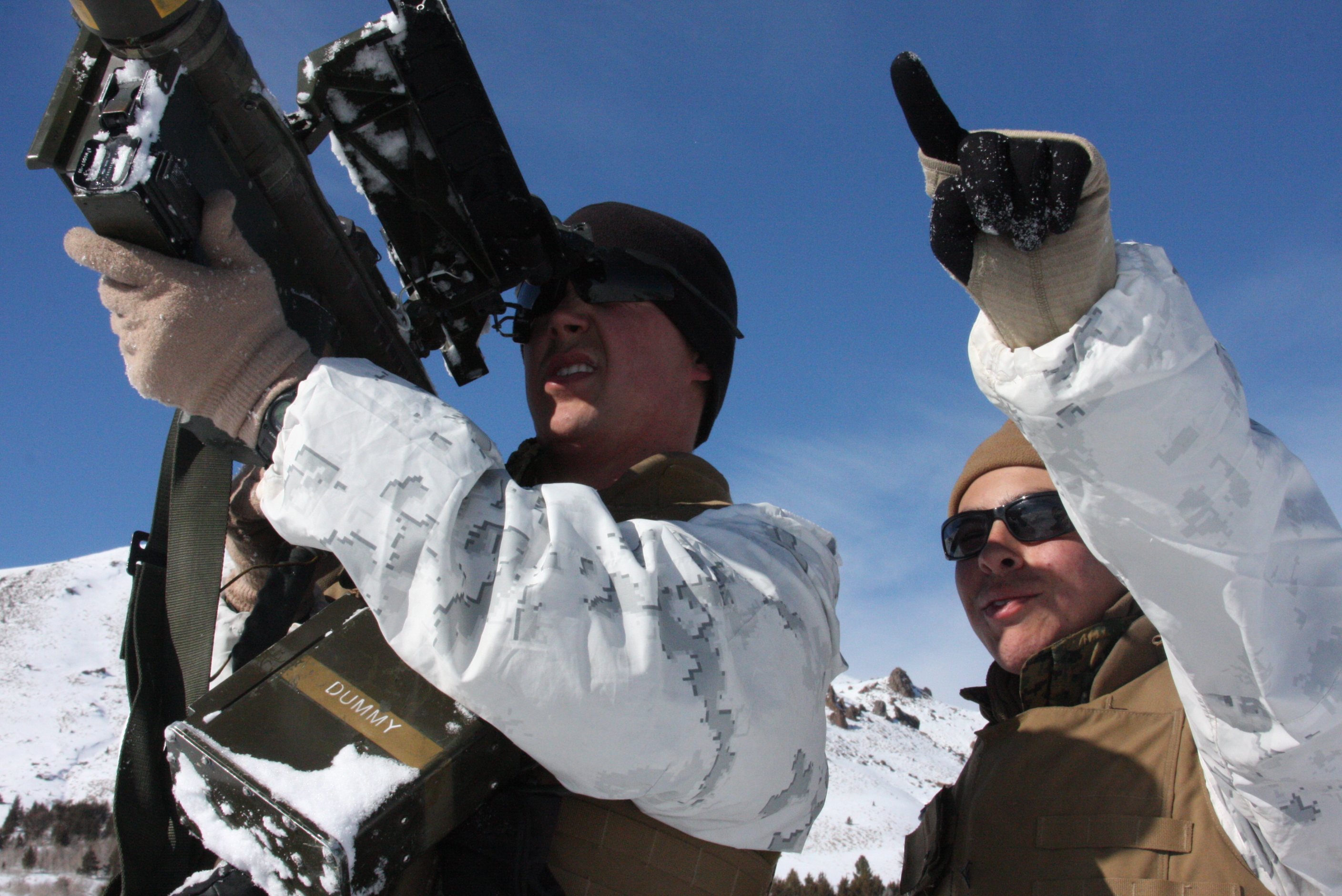
A U.S. Marine antiaircraft gunner aims his Stinger at a location indicated by a spotter.

Long-range systems generally use radar systems for target detection, and depending on the generation of system, may "hand off" to a separate tracking radar for attack. Short range systems are more likely to be entirely visual for detection.

Hybrid systems are also common. The MIM-72 Chaparral was fired optically, but normally operated with a short range early warning radar that displayed targets to the operator. This radar, the FAAR, was taken into the field with a Gama Goat and set up behind the lines. Information was passed to the Chaparral via a data link. Likewise, the UK's Rapier system included a simple radar that displayed the rough direction of a target on a series of lamps arranged in a circle. The missile operator would point his telescope in that rough direction and then hunt for the target visually.

== See also ==
- List of surface-to-air missiles
- Anti-aircraft warfare
- Man-portable air-defense systems
- Missile guidance
- List of anti-aircraft weapons
- List of NATO reporting names for surface-to-air missiles
- Suppression of Enemy Air Defenses (SEAD), the mission of finding and destroying SAM and AA gun installations. The SEAD mission in the United States Air Force is designated "Wild Weasel".
