= Brakemine =

British World War II surface-to-air missile

Brakemine was an early surface-to-air missile (SAM) development project carried out in the United Kingdom during World War II. Brakemine used a beam riding guidance system developed at A.C. Cossor, while REME designed the testbed airframes. Trial launches were carried out between 1944 and 1945, and the effort wound down as the war ended. Although Brakemine would never be used in its original form, its use of the "twist-and-steer" guidance method would later be used on the more capable LOPGAP design, which, after major changes, emerged as the Bristol Bloodhound. A single Brakemine survives in the REME Museum.

== History ==
Brakemine was the result of two independently developed versions of the beam riding guidance system concept. In 1942, Captain Sedgfield of the Royal Electrical and Mechanical Engineers (REME) wrote a technical paper on the concept. In 1943, Leslie Herbert Bedford, director of research at A.C. Cossor, independently developed the same idea while on a long train ride.

The filing of two similar concepts led to a conference at the headquarters of Anti-Aircraft Command (AA Command), attended by General Officer Commanding-in-Chief Frederick Pile and Brigadier J.A.E. Burls, Chief Mechanical Engineer of AA Command (and inventor of the Pile Platform). A follow-up meeting started planning for a number of committees to study development of the concept, but worried that this would lead to lengthy delays, Burls decided to allow Cossor a free hand to develop the guidance system while (the now Major) Sedgfield would handle rocket development at the AA Command's workshops at Park Royal. Development began in February 1944.

The Brakemine missile developed as a simple cylindrical airframe with an ogive nosecone, small elliptical wings mounted near the centre of gravity, and four small fins at the rear. The missile was powered by eight solid rockets taken from the existing Unrotated Projectile anti-aircraft rocket (also used on the RP-3); later models used six rockets. (Note: Baxter mentions the change from eight to six, Morton mentions only six 3-inch rockets. During 1943/44 the 2-inch design was being phased out in favour of the 3-inch, so it is likely the change was the move from eight 2-inch to six 3-inch rockets. This would take up about the same room on the missile, and provide somewhat greater thrust.) Its flight was controlled using the "twist-and-steer" method of the two main wings. These were connected to the missile fuselage with pivots, allowing them to rotate to different angles of attack. To turn the missile, the wings would first rotate in opposite directions to cause the missile to roll. Once the wings were perpendicular to the required direction, they would then be rotated in the same direction, creating lift to change its course.

A launcher consisting of a rail mounted to an QF 3.7 inch AA gun traversal mechanism was built at Walton-on-the-Naze and test firings started in September 1944. This pre-dates the Fairey Stooge, and is the first launch of an anti-aircraft missile of British design. Early tests resulted in numerous failures, but as the missiles fell into the ocean they could be retrieved for study and the flaws corrected. As the missile aerodynamics improved and the failure rate dropped, further launches were fitted with the guidance system, although they were not turned on. Twenty of these early designs were built and flown, shots 11 through 20 with the guidance system installed.

At this point an improved missile body was introduced, and launches of the fully operational system took place. (Note: Apparently these started in 1945, although it is not specifically recorded in existing sources.) Guidance was provided by the "Blue Cedar" radar, then in testing and entering service post-war as "Radar, Anti-Aircraft No. 3 Mk. 7". A proximity fuse was ready for use, but a warhead was never tested. When the war in Europe ended in the midst of testing, the Army lost interest in the project. It was, at this time, the best-developed missile system in Britain.

Further development was taken up by the Ministry of Supply (MoS), who also took over development of the competing Stooge. The MoS moved the project to their rocket testing facilities at RAF Aberporth in Wales, but no further launches took place. The dozen existing Stooge test airframes were fired from Aberporth before that program also ended. Further development on both projects ended in favour of the much more powerful English Electric Thunderbird, which had little in common with either project.

Brakemine would have one lasting influence on British missile development, however. The MoS was interested in a much more capable design with altitude performance to 40,000 feet (12,000 m) and selected Brakemine's twist-and-steer manoeuvering system as the basis for this greatly improved LOPGAP design developed by Fairey. Over time these early developments culminated in the Bristol Bloodhound for the RAF, which competed with the Army's Thunderbird.

== Description ==
The surviving Brakemine missile at the REME Museum is about 8 feet long, 2 feet in diameter. Two wide-chord elliptical wings are mounted on either side just below the center of the missile. Much smaller rectangular fins are at the extreme rear of the airframe. The launcher consisted of a bridgework placed on the gun mounting, with two rails on top of the bridgework. The missile fuselage rode in the gap between the rails, with the rockets wrapped around the fuselage and falling away after launch.

One problem with the guidance system that was not solved during Brakemine's development was its reliance on a known launch orientation providing an "up" direction. If the missile rolled during its initial flight before the guidance system activated, this direction would not be set correctly and the automated system that attempted to keep the missile centered in the radar beam would instead send out corrections that would move it further away from it.

== Survivors ==
A single Brakemine missile is preserved in the REME Museum of Technology.
