= Bristol Thor =

1950s British ramjet missile engine

Thor
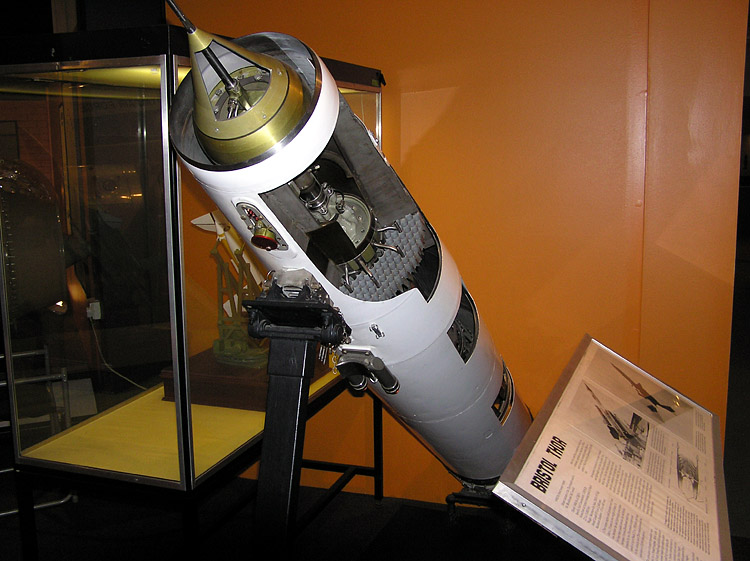
- Bristol Thor modified for display purposes
- Type: Ramjet
- National origin: United Kingdom
- Manufacturer: Bristol Aero Engines
- First run: 1950
- Major applications: Bristol Bloodhound

The Bristol Thor, latterly Bristol Siddeley BS.1009 Thor, was a 16-inch (41 cm) diameter ramjet engine developed by Bristol Aero Engines (later Bristol Siddeley Engines) for the Bristol Bloodhound anti-aircraft missile.

Although Bristol Aero Engines acquired ramjet technology from the US company Marquardt, BAE put considerable effort into developing the Thor unit, including the construction of a high altitude test plant (HATP) at their Patchway site, with a supersonic test cell.

The Bloodhound Mk.1 could attain a speed of Mach 2.2, while the Mk.2 was capable of just over Mach 2.7.

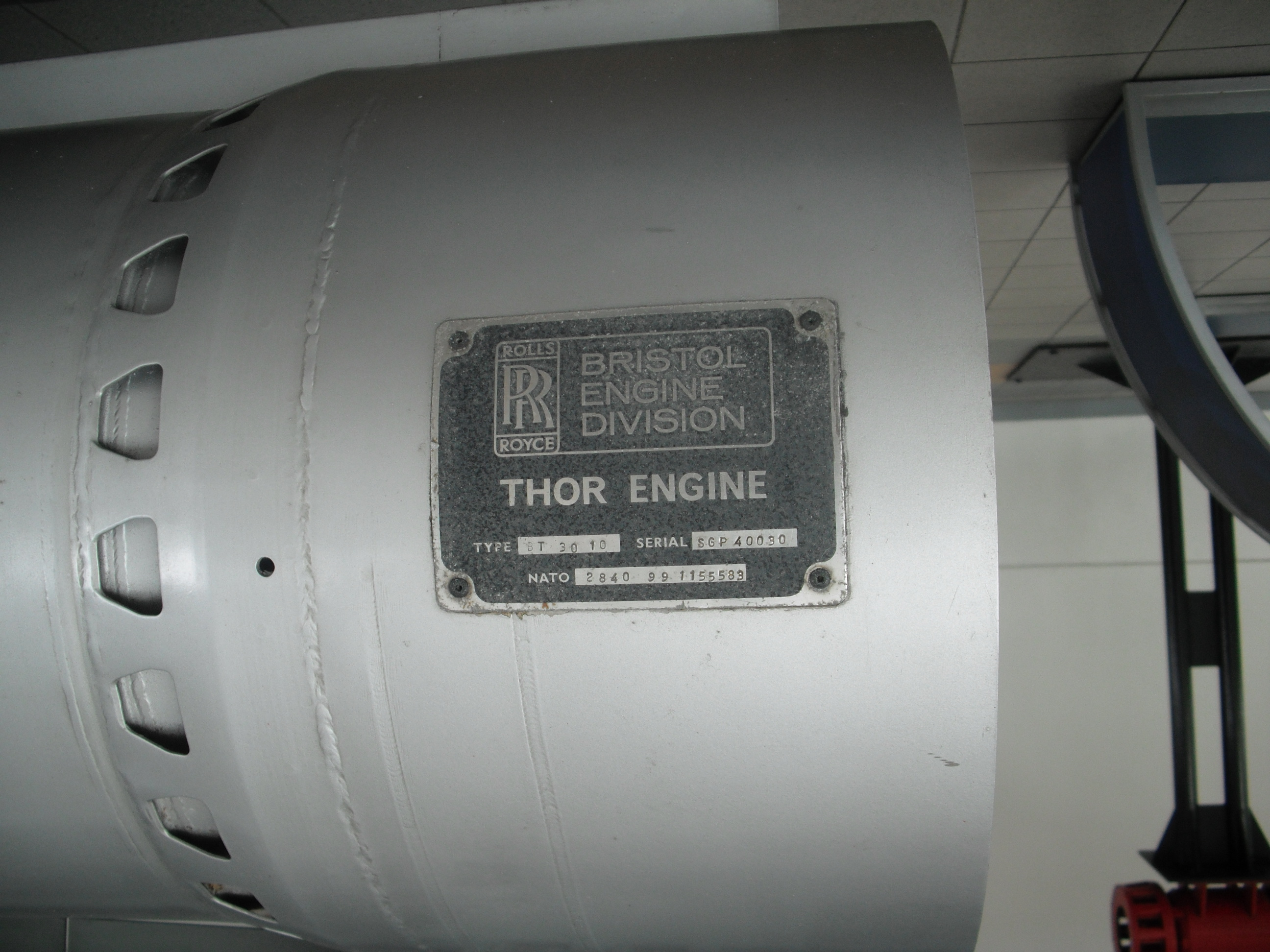
Engine identification plate

== Variants ==
BT.1 Thor
BT.2 Thor
BT.4 Thor
BS.1009 Thor

== Specifications (BT.2 Thor) ==
Data from

==== General characteristics ====
- Type: Ramjet
- Length: 103.9 in (2,639 mm)
- Diameter: 15.75 in (400 mm)
- Dry weight:

==== Components ====
- Compressor:

==== Performance ====
- Maximum thrust: (BT.1) – 5,275 lbf (23 kN) at M2.0 at sea level
- Specific fuel consumption: 2.5 lb/(lbf h) (254.84 kg/(kN h)) at full thrust at sea level
