= S-25 Berkut =

S-25 (NATO reporting name: SA-1 Guild)
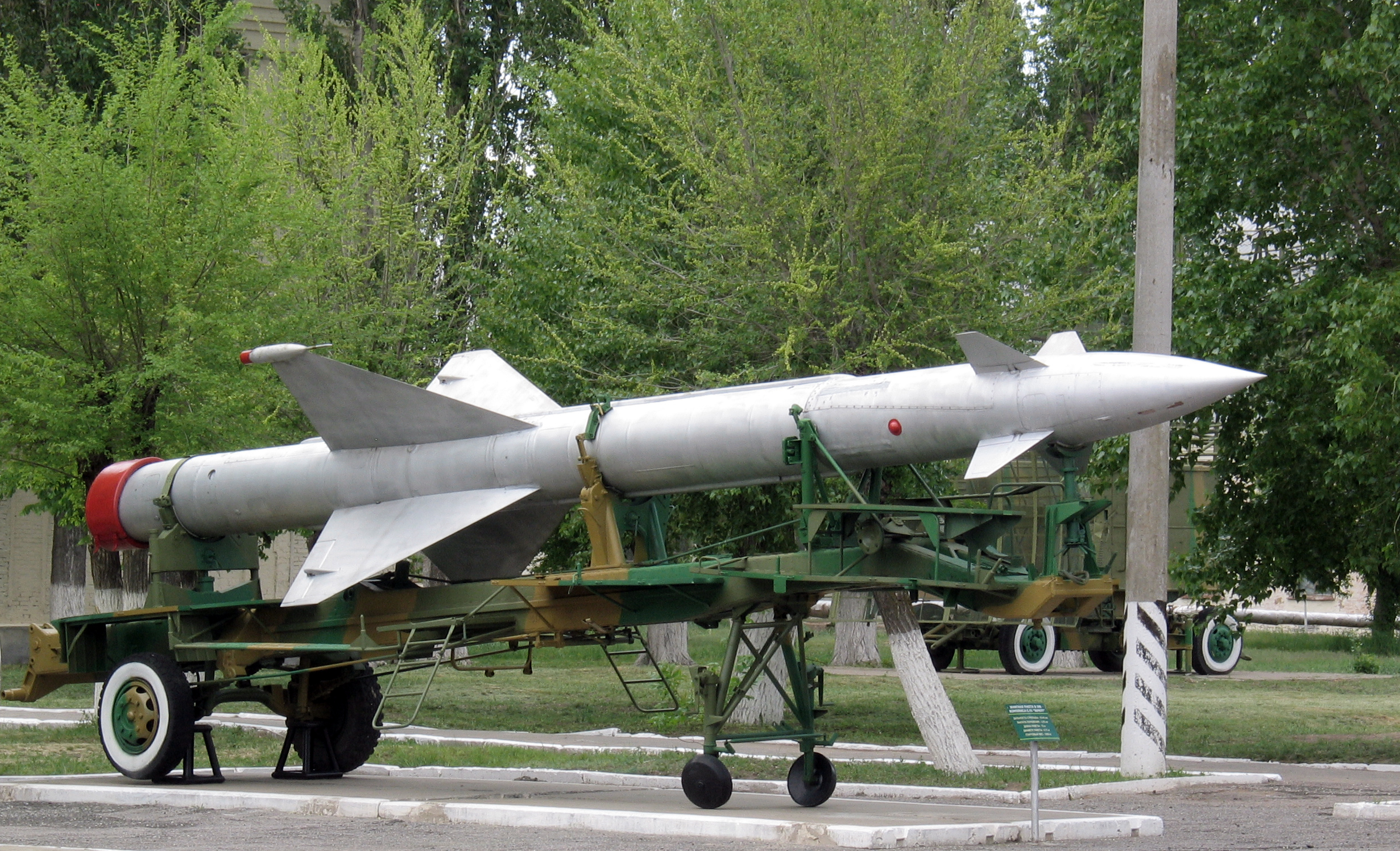
- A V-300 missile on display at the Kapustin Yar museum in Znamensk, Russia
- Type: Surface-to-air missile
- Place of origin: Soviet Union

Service history
- In service: 1955−1986
- Used by: Soviet Union

Production history
- Designer: Lavochkin OKB
- Designed: 1950
- Produced: 1954−1959
- No. built: 32,000

Specifications
- Mass: 3,500 kg (7,700 lb)
- Length: 12 m (39 ft)
- Diameter: 700 mm (28 in)
- Wingspan: 2.7 m (8 ft 10 in)
- Warhead: High-explosive fragmentation (HE-FRAG)
- Warhead weight: 250 kg (550 lb)
- Detonation mechanism: Impact and proximity fuses
- Engine: Liquid-propellant rocket motor
- Operational range: 32–40 km (20–25 mi)
- Flight ceiling: 20 km (12 mi)
- Maximum speed: Mach 2.5
- Steering system: Command guidance

The S-25, initially designated as Berkut (Russian: С-25 «Беркут»; "Berkut" means golden eagle in English) was the first operational surface-to-air missile system fielded by the Soviet Union. In was first tested at Kapustin Yar in the early 1950s, was deployed in several rings around Moscow starting in 1955 and became combat ready in June 1956. However, the system failed to detect, track, and intercept the only overflight of the Soviet capital Moscow by a Lockheed U-2 reconnaissance plane on 5 July 1956. It was only ever used defensively around Moscow. The more mobile S-75 Dvina (SA-2 Guideline) would be used in almost all other locations. Several improvements were introduced over the system's long service life. It was finally replaced by the S-300P in 1982.

The system's NATO reporting name is SA-1 Guild. S-25 is short for Systema 25, referring to the entire system of missiles, radars, and launchers. Portions of the system include the V-300 missile, R-113 and B-200 radars, and A-11/A-12 antennas for the B-200.

== Background ==
After World War II, the Soviet Union began working on improving the defenses of its capital, Moscow, against a possible nuclear attack by American and British strategic bombers. Under Joseph Stalin, a missile program based on captured German military technology and backed by an extensive modernization of anti-aircraft artillery was launched.

A 1958 U.S. Army study concluded that Moscow had the densest air defense networks of any location at the time. While the Soviets improved their anti-aircraft guns with the incorporation of fire control systems and proximity fuzes besides having an extensive program to develop interceptor aircraft, Stalin had a special interest in surface-to-air missiles based on the fact that anti-aircraft artillery and fighter aircraft did little to blunt Allied bombings against Germany.

In 1950, the program Berkut ("Golden Eagle") was launched under the direction of Sergey Beria (the son of Lavrentiy Beria) and Major General Pavel N. Kuksenko of Special Bureau no. 1 (SB-1). (Note: According to Gruntman, the SB-1 was reorganized as the Design Bureau no. 1 (KB-1) in 1950, while Zaloga states that after Beria's fall from power in 1953, it was renamed the Design Bureau no. 1 of the Ministry of Agricultural Machinery (Ministerstva selkokhozyaystvennogo mashinostroeniya, an immediate post-war cover name for the Soviet munitions industry that was used until the mid-1950s).) After Stalin's death in 1953 and the power struggle that ensued, both Sergey Beria and Kuksenko were dismissed and replaced by Alexander A. Raspletin as the sole director of the program, while the program itself was renamed to S-25 in order to erase Lavrentiy Beria's memory (the "Berkut" codename came from Beria and Kuksenko's names).

== Description ==
The S-25 was based on the German Wasserfall missile. Like the German design, it used a liquid-fuel rocket motor fed by turbine pumps, while the frame featured fins and canards to control the missile during flight. It was designed to protect the Moscow area from an attack by 1,000 strategic bombers.

The B-200 radar (codenamed "Yo-Yo" by Western intelligence due to the unusual arrangement) was capable of targeting up to 20 bombers at the same time and it could also track and steer the missiles at the same time, making the system far more advanced than the Wasserfall. The V-300 missiles were fitted with proximity fuzes to detonate the warhead during the terminal stage of interception.

According to Hogg, the V-300 missile had a slant range of 40 km (25 mi), while Isby gives the following figures: an effective range of 32–40 km (20–25 mi), maximum altitude of 20 km (12 mi), and a Mach 2.5 (2,660 km/h) maximum speed. Gruntman stated that the complete system was capable of simultaneously engaging 1,120 targets at a distances of 35–45 km (22–28 mi) flying at altitudes of 3–25 km (1.9–15.5 mi).

According to Isby, the S-25 radar systems included:

- B-200 (NATO reporting name: "Yo-Yo") fire-control radar, E-band, 150 km (93 mi) range.
- P-14 (NATO reporting name: "Tall King") early-warning radar, A-band, 550 km (340 mi) range.
- A-100 (NATO reporting name: "Gage") acquisition radar, E-band, 300 km (190 mi) range.
- "Patty Cake" acquisition radar, D/E-band 200 km (120 mi) range.

The complete system was composed of two rings around Moscow, the inner ring with 24 launching sites and the outer ring with 32 sites. Each launch site was manned by 30 officers and 450 enlisted men, and featured 60 missile launch pads (a semi-trailer transporter erector launcher), a pair of B-200 radars (one providing azimuth coverage and the other elevation coverage), a command bunker housing a BESM analog fire control computer plus twenty guidance consoles, the administrative/housing/technical support area and an electric power transformer station.

According to Zaloga about 32,000 V-300 missiles were produced between 1954 and 1959, and Isby gives a total of 3,200 launchers built.

== History ==
In August 1950, Stalin ordered the creation of an air defense system around Moscow capable of stopping a force of 1,000 bombers coming from all directions, a specification that was kept in place even after Stalin's death.

Due to the time constraints imposed by Stalin, the S-25 borrowed heavily from German technology and expertise, with some improvements introduced by Soviet scientists. The first prototype of the B-200 radar was completed in 1951, but it didn't meet the required specifications. A second prototype was completed in June 1952 and tested from 24 June to 20 September 1952. In the first tests of the guidance systems, these were mounted on aircraft rather than missiles.

The first test launches of the V-300 missile took place on 25 June 1951 at the Kapustin Yar proving grounds. 50 missiles were fired before the B-200 radars arrived in late 1952. Between September 1952 and May 1953, 81 missiles were fired as the designers began integrating the missile and fire control systems. The first test of the complete system was conducted on 25 May 1953, when a Tupolev Tu-4 was successfully shot down by a V-300 missile at an altitude of 7 km (4.3 mi). Development of the initial version of the Berkut system was completed in June 1953, while the production version of the V-300 missile was test fired in 1954, engaging 20 simultaneous targets. A nuclear version of the V-300 missile carrying a 10 kt warhead was tested in January 1957, against a tight formation of planes.

Construction of the launch sites, nicknamed by Nikita Khrushchev as Moskovskiy chastokol (Moscow palisades), began in 1953 and was completed through 1958. US intelligence estimated that construction of the S-25 infrastructure between 1953 and 1955 consumed the equivalent of an entire year's production of concrete. Mass production of the V-300 missiles began in 1954 at the State Aviation Plant No. 82 in Tushino. By 1959 about 32,000 V-300 missiles had been manufactured. Due to the large scale of the project and its close proximity to Moscow, Western intelligence agencies were aware of it as early as 1953. German technicians allowed to return home following Stalin's death provided a large amount of information about the system, which was codenamed as the SA-1 Guild by NATO.

The system became operational in 1955. During its service life the S-25 went through several degrees of modification to improve performance. It was fired without scoring any hits against US spy planes. Despite the system age and obsolescence, the Defense Intelligence Agency (DIA) estimated that the V-PVO still had 2,200 operational launchers out of a total of 3,200 as late as 1986. It was replaced in service by the S-300 (NATO reporting name: SA-10 "Grumble").

== Operators ==
=== Former ===
- Soviet Union − Remained in service as late as 1986
- Russia − Currently used as targets for training SAM systems. Strizh target-missile (system S-25M) in service as of 2011. Firing more than 11,000 missiles.
