= Beam riding =

Missile guidance system

Beam-riding, also known as line-of-sight beam riding (LOSBR), beam guidance or radar beam riding is a technique of directing a missile to its target by means of radar or a laser beam. The name refers to the way the missile flies down the guidance beam, which is aimed at the target. It is one of the simplest guidance systems and was widely used on early missile systems, however it had a number of disadvantages for long-range targeting and is now found typically only in short-range roles.

== Basic concept ==
Beam riding is based on a signal that is pointed towards the target. The signal does not have to be powerful, as it is not necessary to use it for tracking as well. The main use of this kind of system is to destroy airplanes or tanks. First, an aiming station (possibly mounted on a vehicle) in the launching area directs a narrow radar or laser beam at the enemy aircraft or tank. Then, the missile is launched and at some point after launch is “gathered” by the radar or laser beam when it flies into it. From this stage onwards, the missile attempts to keep itself inside the beam, while the aiming station keeps the beam pointing at the target. The missile, controlled by a computer inside it, “rides” the beam to the target.

== Radar beam riding ==
Beam riding is one of the simplest methods of missile guidance using a radar. It was widely used for surface-to-air missiles in the post-World War II era for this reason. An early example was the British Brakemine, first tested in 1944, as was the first commercially available SAM, the Oerlikon Contraves RSA.

Early tracking radars generally use a beam a few degrees wide, which makes it easy to find the target as it moves about. Unfortunately, this makes the beam too wide to accurately attack the target, where measurements on the order of 1/10 of a degree are required. To perform both operations in a single radar, some additional form of encoding is used. For WWII-era systems this was either lobe switching, or more commonly by the second half of the war, conical scanning. Conical scanning works by splitting the single radar beam in two, and comparing the return strength in the two beams to determine which is stronger. The radar is then rotated towards the stronger signal to re-center the target. The antenna is spun so that this comparison is being carried out all around the target, allowing it to track in both altitude and azimuth. Systems that performed this automatically were known as "lock on" or "lock follow".

Beam riding systems can be easily adapted to work with such a system. By placing receiver antennas on the rear of the missile, the onboard electronics can compare the strength of the signal from different points on the missile body and use this to create a control signal to steer it back into the center of the beam. When used with conical scanning, the comparison can use several sets of paired antennas, typically two pairs, to keep itself centered in both axes. This system has the advantage of offloading the tracking to the ground radar; as long as the radar can keep itself accurately pointed at the target, the missile will keep itself along the same line using very simple electronics.

The inherent disadvantage of the radar beam riding system is that the beam spreads as it travels outward from the broadcaster (see inverse square law). As the missile flies towards the target, it, therefore, becomes increasingly inaccurate. This is not a problem at short ranges, but as many early surface-to-air missiles were designed to work at long ranges, this was a major issue. For example, earlier versions of the RIM-2 Terrier missile introduced in the 1950s were beam riders, but later variants employed semi-active radar homing to improve their effectiveness against high-performance and low-flying targets. In contrast to beam riding, semi-active guidance becomes more accurate as the missile approaches the target.

Another issue is the guidance path of the missile is essentially a straight line to the target. This is useful for missiles with a great speed advantage over their target, or where flight times are short, but for long-range engagements against high-performance targets the missile will need to "lead" the target in order to arrive with enough energy to do terminal manoeuvres. A possible solution for this problem was to use two radars, one for tracking the target and another for guiding the missile, but this drove up implementation costs. A more common solution for long-range missiles was to guide the missile entirely independently of the radar, using command guidance, as was the case for the Nike Hercules. Pure radar beam riding was rare by 1960.

== Laser beam riding ==
Beam riding guidance based systems became more common again in the 1980s and 90s with the introduction of low-cost and highly portable laser designators. Due to the shorter wavelengths used, a laser beam can be projected with a much narrower angular resolution than a radar beam while not requiring a significant increase in the size of the projector's aperture when compared to other optical devices being used by a typical guidance system for precision-guided munitions. Because of this, it is possible to spatially encode additional information in a beam using digital or electro-optical means, which has a number of advantages. Missiles with small optical receivers on their tail can beam-ride on lasers with similar ease as earlier radar beam systems, but will be inherently more accurate due to the higher spatial resolution of the beam's encoding at the target.

Additionally, because the beam is usually projected directly onto the missile's receiver, an order of magnitude less intensity is needed than a semi-active design where the target must be "painted" and the missile must detect the laser's diffuse reflection from the target. The lower intensity requirement of laser beam riding systems compared to semi-active laser homing systems can make them significantly more difficult for a target's laser warning receivers to detect. Very low power signals can be used.

In modern use, laser beam riding is generally limited to short-range missiles, both anti-air and anti-tank. Examples include ADATS, the Starstreak, the RBS 70, Russian 9K121 Vikhr and 9M119 Svir, Ukrainian Skif and Stuhna-P ATGMs.

== See also ==
- Semi-active radar homing
