= HMS Hampshire (D06) =

1963 County-class guided missile destroyer of the Royal Navy

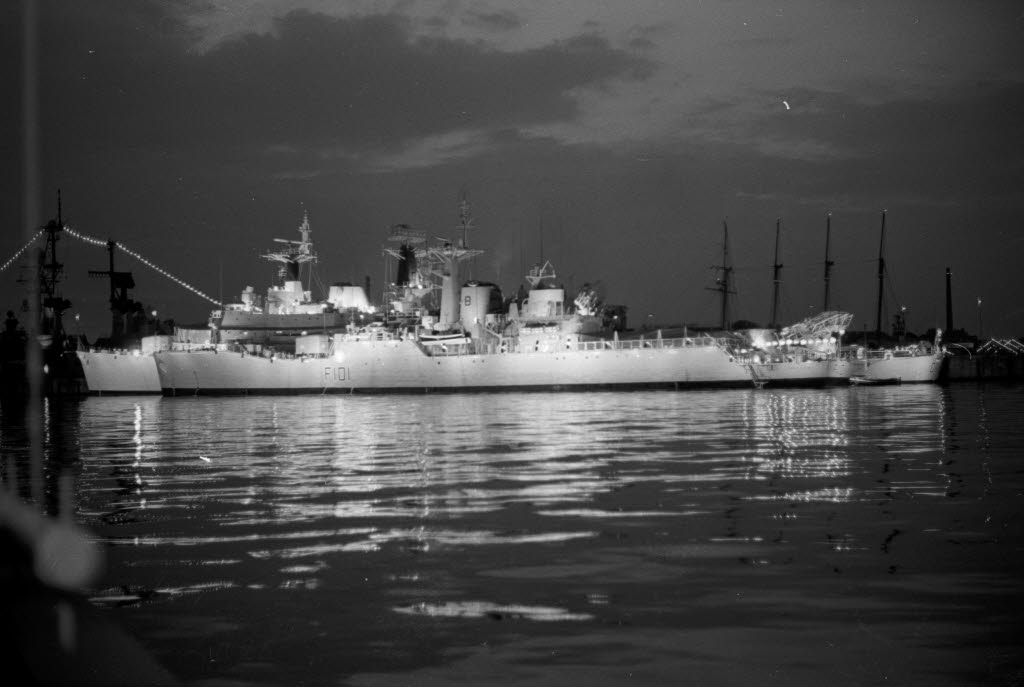
- HMS Hampshire behind HMS Yarmouth (F101)

History

United Kingdom
- Name: HMS Hampshire
- Ordered: 27 January 1956
- Builder: John Brown & Company, Clydebank, Scotland
- Laid down: 26 March 1959
- Launched: 16 March 1961
- Commissioned: 15 March 1963
- Decommissioned: 1976
- Identification: Pennant number: D06
- Fate: Sold for scrap in 1979

General characteristics
- Class & type: County-class destroyer
- Displacement: 6,200 long tons (6,300 t) normal; 6,800 long tons (6,900 t) full load
- Length: 505 ft (154 m) pp; 521 ft 6 in (158.95 m) oa
- Beam: 54 ft (16 m)
- Draught: 20 ft 6 in (6.25 m)
- Propulsion: 2 shaft COSAG (Combined steam and gas) turbines; Geared steam turbines, 30,000 shp (22,000 kW); 4× G6 gas turbines, 30,000 shp (22,000 kW)
- Speed: 30 kn (56 km/h; 35 mph); (25 kn (46 km/h; 29 mph) steam only)
- Range: 3,500 nmi (6,500 km; 4,000 mi) at 28 kn (52 km/h; 32 mph)
- Complement: 471
- Sensors & processing systems: Type 965 air search radar; Type 277 height finder radar; Type 992 target indication radar; Type 901 Seaslug fire control radar; Type 902/903 Seacat fire control radar; Type 177 Sonar
- Armament: 4× 4.5 inch (114 mm) Mark 6 guns (2 twin turrets); 2 × mountings for Oerlikon 20 mm cannon; 1 twin Seaslug surface-to-air missile launcher; 2 × Quad GWS-21 Seacat short-range surface-to-air missile launcher
- Aircraft carried: 1 × Wessex helicopter

HMS Hampshire was a County-class destroyer of the Royal Navy. Laid down, in March 1959 a couple of weeks behind the class leader Devonshire, she was classified as a guided missile destroyer, as the Sea Lords regarded the concept of the cruiser and big gun ship as discredited by the perceived failure of the Tiger class and the obsolescence of the heavy gun. The description of guided missile destroyer seemed more likely to win approval from the Treasury and Government for an adequate number of warships the size of small cruisers, which could play many traditional cruiser flagship and command functions, but had no armour around its gun and missile magazine.

== Construction and design ==
Hampshire was one of two County-class destroyers ordered under the British Admiralty's 1955–56 shipbuilding programme. She was laid down at John Brown & Company's Clydebank shipyard on 26 March 1959 and launched by Princess Margaret on 16 March 1961. The ship was completed on 15 March 1963, and was the fifth ship of that name to serve with the Royal Navy.

Hampshire was 521 feet 6 inches (158.95 m) long overall and 505 feet (153.92 m) between perpendiculars, with a beam of 54 feet (16.46 m) and a draught of 20 feet 6 inches (6.25 m). Displacement was 6,200 long tons (6,300 t) normal and 6,800 long tons (6,900 t) deep load. The ship was propelled by a combination of steam turbines and gas turbines in a Combined steam and gas (COSAG) arrangement, driving two propeller shafts. Each shaft could by driven by a single 15,000 shaft horsepower (11,000 kW) steam turbine (fed with steam at 700 pounds per square inch (4,800 kPa) and 950 °F (510 °C; 783 K)) from Babcock & Wilcox boilers) and two Metrovick G6 gas turbines (each rated at 7,500 shaft horsepower (5,600 kW)), with the gas turbines being used for high speeds and to allow a quick departure from ports without waiting for steam to be raised. Maximum speed was 30 knots (35 mph; 56 km/h) and the ship had a range of 3,500 nautical miles (4,000 mi; 6,500 km) at 28 knots (32 mph; 52 km/h).

A twin launcher for the Seaslug anti-aircraft missile was fitted aft. The Seaslug GWS1 was a beam riding missile which had an effective range of about 19 mi; 31 km. Up to 39 Seaslugs could be carried horizontally in a magazine that ran much of the length of the ship. Close-in anti-aircraft protection was provided by a pair of Seacat (missile) launchers, while two twin QF 4.5 inch Mark V gun mounts were fitted forward. A helicopter deck and hangar allowed a single Westland Wessex helicopter to be operated.

A Type 965 long-range air-search radar and a Type 278 height-finding radar was fitted on the ship's mainmast, with a Type 992Q navigation radar and an array of ESM aerials were mounted on the ship's foremast. Type 901 fire control radar for the Seaslug missile was mounted aft. Type 184 sonar was fitted.

== Operational service ==
On 18 June 1963, Hampshire interrupted trials, to host the burial at sea of Admiral Cunningham, off the Nab Tower, near the Isle of Wight. In March 1964, as part of efforts to reinforce British forces in the Far East in response to the escalating Indonesia–Malaysia confrontation, Hampshire left Britain, arriving at Singapore on 13 April.

From her third Commission in 1967 Hampshire flew the flag of the Flag Officer, Western Fleet (United Kingdom). In July 1969 she was present at Torbay for the Royal Review and presentation of a new colour to the Western Fleet (United Kingdom).

== Decommissioning and disposal ==
In the late 1960s there were plans to upgrade Hampshire and sister destroyers armed with Seaslug Mk 1, with Seaslug Mk 2 and a digital combat system being fitted, but the upgrade of Hampshire and Devonshire was cancelled on 31 March 1967 because of the amount of the time the ships would be out of the operational fleet, with the remaining two upgrades cancelled in 1968.

In 1976 she was the first of the County-class destroyers to be decommissioned. This was at a time the Labour Government was making severe defence cuts under pressure from the International Monetary Fund (IMF). She was cannibalised for spares to service her sister ships and subsequently sold for scrap in 1979, being broken up at Briton Ferry by Thos. W. Ward.

== Commanding officers ==
Notable commanding officers include R A Trowbridge from 1967–1969 and R P Clayton between 1969 and 1970.

== In media ==
The Hampshire appears in the UFO episode "Destruction", as it is used to secretly place sealed tanks filled with lethal gas from an unnamed war under water.

== Bibliography ==
- Blackman, Raymond V. B. (1971). Jane's Fighting Ships 1971–72. London: Sampson Low, Marston & Co. Ltd. ISBN 0-354-00096-9.
- Colledge, J. J.; Warlow, Ben (2006) [1969]. Ships of the Royal Navy: The Complete Record of All Fighting Ships of the Royal Navy from the 15th Century to the Present (3rd Rev ed.). London: Chatham Publishing. ISBN 978-1-86176-281-8. OCLC 67375475.
- Friedman, Norman (2008). British Destroyers & Frigates: The Second World War and After. Barnsley, UK: Seaforth Publishing. ISBN 978-1-84832-015-4.
- Gardiner, Robert; Chumbley, Stephen (1995). Conway's All The World's Fighting Ships 1947–1995. Annapolis, Maryland, USA: Naval Institute Press. ISBN 1-55750-132-7.
- Marriott, Leo (1989). Royal Navy Destroyers Since 1945. Shepperton, UK: Ian Allan. ISBN 0-7110-1817-0.
- McCart, Neil (2014). County Class Guided Missile Destroyers. Liskeard, UK: Maritime Books. ISBN 978-1904459637.
- Moore, John (1985). Jane's Fighting Ships 1985–86. London: Jane's Yearbooks. ISBN 0 7106-0814-4.
- Roberts, John (2009). Safeguarding the Nation: The Story of the Royal Navy. Barnsley, UK: Seaforth Publishing. ISBN 978-1-84832-043-7.
