= HMS Girdle Ness =

British missile trials ship

History

United Kingdom
- Name: Penlee Point
- Ordered: 1944
- Builder: Burrard Dry Dock Co. Ltd.
- Laid down: 7 December 1944
- Launched: 29 March 1945
- Commissioned: 5 September 1945
- Out of service: 1952
- Commissioned: 24 July 1956
- Renamed: Girdle Ness
- Identification: Pennant number: As Penlee Point: F04 As Girdle Ness: A387
- Fate: Scrapped in Faslane in 1970

General characteristics as built
- Class & type: Beachy Head-class repair ship
- Displacement: 8,580 long tons (8,718 t) standard
- Length: 441 ft 6 in (134.6 m) oa; 425 ft 0 in (129.5 m) pp
- Beam: 57 ft (17.4 m)
- Draught: 20 ft (6.1 m)
- Propulsion: Oil-fired triple-expansion steam engines, 2 boilers, 1 shaft, 2,500 ihp (1,864 kW)
- Speed: 11 knots (20 km/h; 13 mph)
- Complement: 270
- Armament: 16 × 20 mm Oerlikon cannons

HMS Girdle Ness was a Beachy Head-class repair ship constructed for the Royal Navy that entered service in 1945. Originally named Penlee Point, the vessel was designed as a maintenance ship for landing craft in the Pacific Theatre of World War II but used as an accommodation ship at Rosyth Dockyard. Renamed Girdle Ness, the ship was taken out of service in 1953 and converted for use in support of missile trials in the development of the Seaslug missile in the early 1960s. After trials of the missile were completed, Girdle Ness was placed in reserve before becoming an accommodation ship as part of the shore establishment HMS Cochrane at Rosyth. The vessel was stricken in 1970.

== Description and early service ==
Following setbacks in the Pacific theatre of operations which led to the loss of naval bases, the Royal Navy required more depot and repair ships for the fleet to replace shore facilities. As part of the war construction programme, the Royal Navy ordered a series of vessels based on standard mercantile designs and modified them to fit their expected roles. Repair and maintenance vessels were ordered from Canadian shipyards with the escort maintenance ships intended to service smaller types of warships, and in the case of Girdle Ness, landing craft.

The ships of the class had a standard displacement of 8,550 long tons (8,687 t) and 11,270 long tons (11,451 t) fully loaded. They were 441 feet 6 inches (134.6 m) long overall and 425 feet 0 inches (129.5 m) between perpendiculars with a beam of 57 feet (17.4 m) and a draught of 20 feet (6.1 m). The vessels were propelled by one shaft driven by a reciprocating triple-expansion steam engine powered by steam from two Foster Wheeler water-tube boilers, creating 2,500 indicated horsepower (1,900 kW). This gave the vessels a maximum speed of 11 knots (20 km/h; 13 mph). Dominion Engineering Works of Montreal, Quebec provided the machinery for Girdle Ness. During the war, the vessels were armed with sixteen single-mounted 20 mm Oerlikon cannons.

Girdle Ness was ordered as HMS Penlee Point. She was built by the Burrard Dry Dock Co. Ltd. at their yard in Vancouver, British Columbia, Canada, as one of twenty-one Beachy Head-class repair ships. These were Canadian Fort ships, similar to the US Victory ships, that had been modified for use as auxiliary ships. Penlee Point was laid down on 7 December 1944 and launched on 29 March 1945. The ship was commissioned on 5 September 1945. The hull was completed at the South Yard of the Vancouver Dry Dock Company. On entering service she was used as an accommodation ship at Rosyth Dockyard from 1946 to 1952, being placed in reserve in 1951.

== Conversion as a trials ship ==
A trials ship was needed to support the Seaslug missile development program. Initial tests were carried out from a shore-based launcher but there was a need to test the missile under realistic conditions, and also to gain experience of handling a large missile at sea. In February 1953 Penlee Point was moved to Devonport Dockyard, Devon, for conversion into a trials ship. The conversion began in May 1953 and was completed in 1956, and she was re-commissioned as Girdle Ness on 24 July. During her conversion the entire superstructure was removed and most of the forward part of the hull gutted to provide space for the missile launcher and its attendant magazines. When she was finally completed in her new guise she had a large, boxy bridge structure, forward of which was a triple Seaslug launcher.

One of the reasons why Girdle Ness was chosen for conversion was a result of a 1950 Admiralty Ship Design Policy Committee recommendation. The committee proposed that three missile-equipped types of ship would be required by the Royal Navy:

A. Task force ship, capable of 30 knots, and armed with two triple Seaslug launchers
B. Ocean convoy escort, capable of 17 knots, and armed with two triple Seaslug launchers
C. Coastal convoy escort, capable of 12 knots, and armed with a triple Seaslug launchers

Girdle Ness was chosen to be a prototype for the Type C coastal convoy escort, although this idea was dropped before she came into service.

=== Radar equipment ===
Seaslug's guidance was a beam riding system, with the missile following a beam projected from the launching ship. This required the installation of a large radar set, for both target acquisition, tracking and the control beam.

The following equipment was installed:

- Parabolic telemetry antenna
- Type 901 radar
- Type 960 radar
- Type 983 height-finding radar
- Type 982 radar

== Missile trials ==
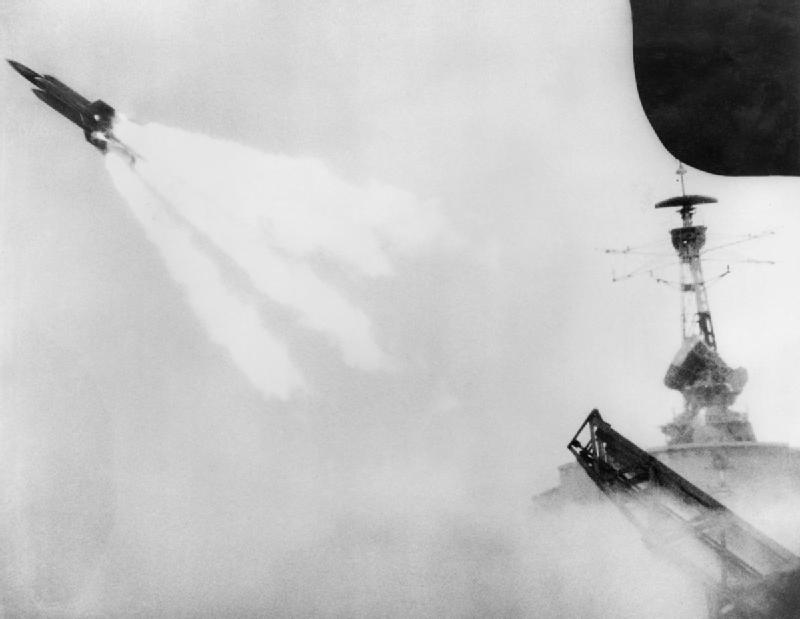
The firing of the first test missile from HMS Girdle Ness

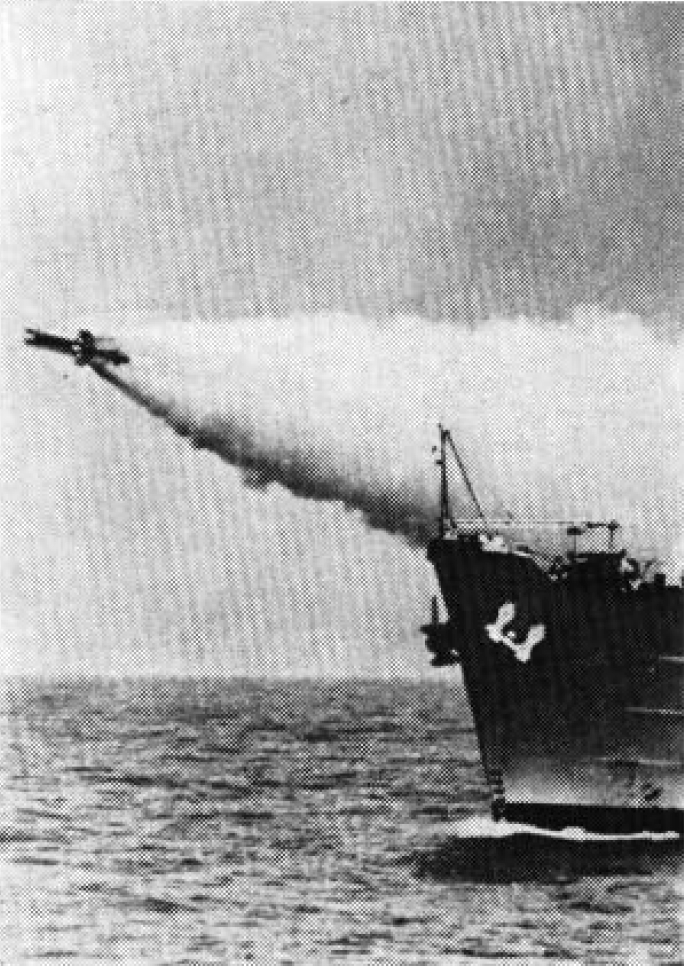
Launch of a Seaslug missile, circa 1961

Seaslug was first tested at RAE Aberporth, on the Welsh coast of Cardigan Bay. Aberporth already hosted the land-based launcher, the Clausen Rolling Platform (nicknamed "HMS Rock'n'Roll"). Later trials were carried out in the Mediterranean, based on Malta.

Seaslug was the UK's first ship-based surface-to-air missile. It used four solid boosters, then a solid sustainer rocket. Once the boosters were dropped and the sustainer fired, four large control surfaces were used to control the missile under beam-riding guidance. Seaslug was a large missile and required mechanical handling to transfer the rounds from the magazine to the trainable launcher. The large magazine was relatively highly automated for its age.

During trials, the ship was crewed by a naval crew, with the missile operators being the first naval staff under training as missile operators. The recording room, staffed by civilian members of the RN Scientific Service, analysed the performance of the Seaslug.

In 1959 RFA Retainer was used for trials of replenishment at sea, transferring the two-ton complete missile rounds by highline transfer replenishment at sea.

== Withdrawal ==
During the course of her life as a missile trials ship Girdle Ness fired 209 Seaslug missiles. When the trials ended, she returned to Devonport and was paid off on 5 December 1961. She was then reclassified as an accommodation ship, and after her return to Rosyth she was re-commissioned on 1 December 1962 and served alongside HMS Duncansby Head, another Beachy Head-class ship, at Rosyth as part of HMS Cochrane. HMS Girdle Ness was decommissioned in early 1970 and was scrapped in Faslane from August 1970 onwards.

The ship's badge, a golden girdle as a trefoil knot on a blue field, is now held by the National Maritime Museum, Greenwich.

== See also ==
- Girdle Ness Lighthouse
- Tracking ship
- USS Mississippi
- USS Norton Sound
