= Clausen Rolling Platform =

1950s missile launching platform in Wales

Coordinates: 52.142591°N 4.557742°W

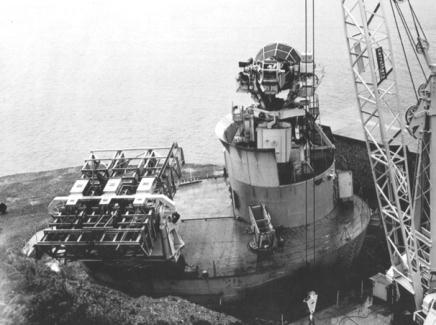
The platform: triple missile launcher to the left, Type 901 radar on the right

The Clausen Rolling Platform was a missile launching platform, built at the coastal missile test range of RAE Aberporth, West Wales, in the 1950s. It used a floating platform in a pool of water to simulate the rolling of a ship at sea, without the drawbacks and costs of going to sea. The Platform was first used for development trials of the Seaslug missile.

Most of the Aberporth site is on a plateau above 450 foot cliffs. The platform was a 750 ton circular steel caisson floating in a diamond-shaped pool, on a concrete platform just above sea level. The pool was 20 metres (66 ft) across and 13 metres (43 ft) deep. Access down the cliffs was made by a cable funicular, taking 11 minutes to descend with a loaded 20 ft long, two-ton missile.

The action of the platform was controlled by actuators fixed to the land. They could move the caisson in both 20° roll and 10° pitch axes independently. Variable water ballast within the caisson allowed its dynamic behaviour and period of oscillation to be adjusted. Its movement could be so violent as to induce seasickness in even experienced sailors, leading to its informal name of 'HMS Rock'n'Roll'.

The platform was fitted with a triple launcher for the missiles and a mounting for the Type 901 fire-control radar. Both of these mounts were stabilised and held a constant direction as the platform rolled beneath them. The radar mount tracked the position constantly, the missile launcher moved in discrete steps.

The Type 901 radar provided the beam-riding guidance for the missile. This tracked the missile and broadcast control signals to it. Separate radars were used to search for targets, track them and estimate their height. At Aberporth these were provided by existing radar equipment, not dedicated to the platform, mounted on top of the cliff. Additional radio equipment was used to control the target drones used, and to receive telemetry from test missiles.

The first Seaslug launch was made from the platform in April 1954. Further tests of the complete system were made from the dedicated missile trials ship HMS Girdle Ness, off the coast of Aberporth and in the Mediterranean around Malta, beginning from the summer of 1957. Testing at Aberporth continued for the improved Seaslug GWS.2 until 1968. The solid-fuel Gosling rocket boosters for Seaslug GWS.1 were produced at RNPF Caerwent in South East Wales. Caerwent also carried out motor trials on these. The last Gosling was produced there on 14 June 1966.

Like that on Girdle Ness, the launcher was a triple launcher. The intention was that Seaslug would be launched in salvoes, to guarantee a successful interception. After successful trials, the size of these salvoes was reduced and the production launchers installed on the County-class destroyers were simplified to a dual launcher. The platform's launcher was reloaded from the static ground alongside the platform and there was no capacity to test reloading ability under rolling conditions.

The platform was named for Hugh Clausen (1888–1972), who had worked on Royal Navy fire control since World War I and was the driving force for the construction of the platform. It was shown off to the public press on occasion, being visited by the Daily Express's science correspondent Chapman Pincher and the Duke of Edinburgh in 1959.

The platform remained in service for testing naval radar and satcom terminal stabilisation. It was also used for testing other sea-launched missile launchers, including Seaslug's successor Sea Dart. Developments in missiles made them smaller and lighter, and no longer requiring to be pointed in such an accurate alignment before launch. Much of this was due to the shift from beam-riding guidance (LOSBR) to automatic command to line of sight (ACLOS) or similar systems. These no longer required the missile to be launched on a precise alignment from a trainable launcher, so that they could be gathered into the command beam. Later missiles such as Sea Wolf would be launched from simpler vertical launchers, which require no stabilisation, but the sextuple launcher for the original Sea Wolf GWS-25 conventional launch block was also tested at Aberporth.

The platform was decommissioned in 2004 and most surface buildings removed, although the underground bunkers remain. The caisson has now been removed but the pool remains and can be seen on public mapping services.

== RAE Bedford ==
Another rolling platform was built at RAE Bedford. This was much simpler than the Aberporth platform and was mounted on dry land, running back and forth on a trolley on rails and with motors to tilt the platform. It was used to develop naval deck-landing techniques with helicopters such as the Westland Wasp and Westland Lynx.

== See also ==
- HMS Girdle Ness
