= County-class destroyer =

Class of British warships

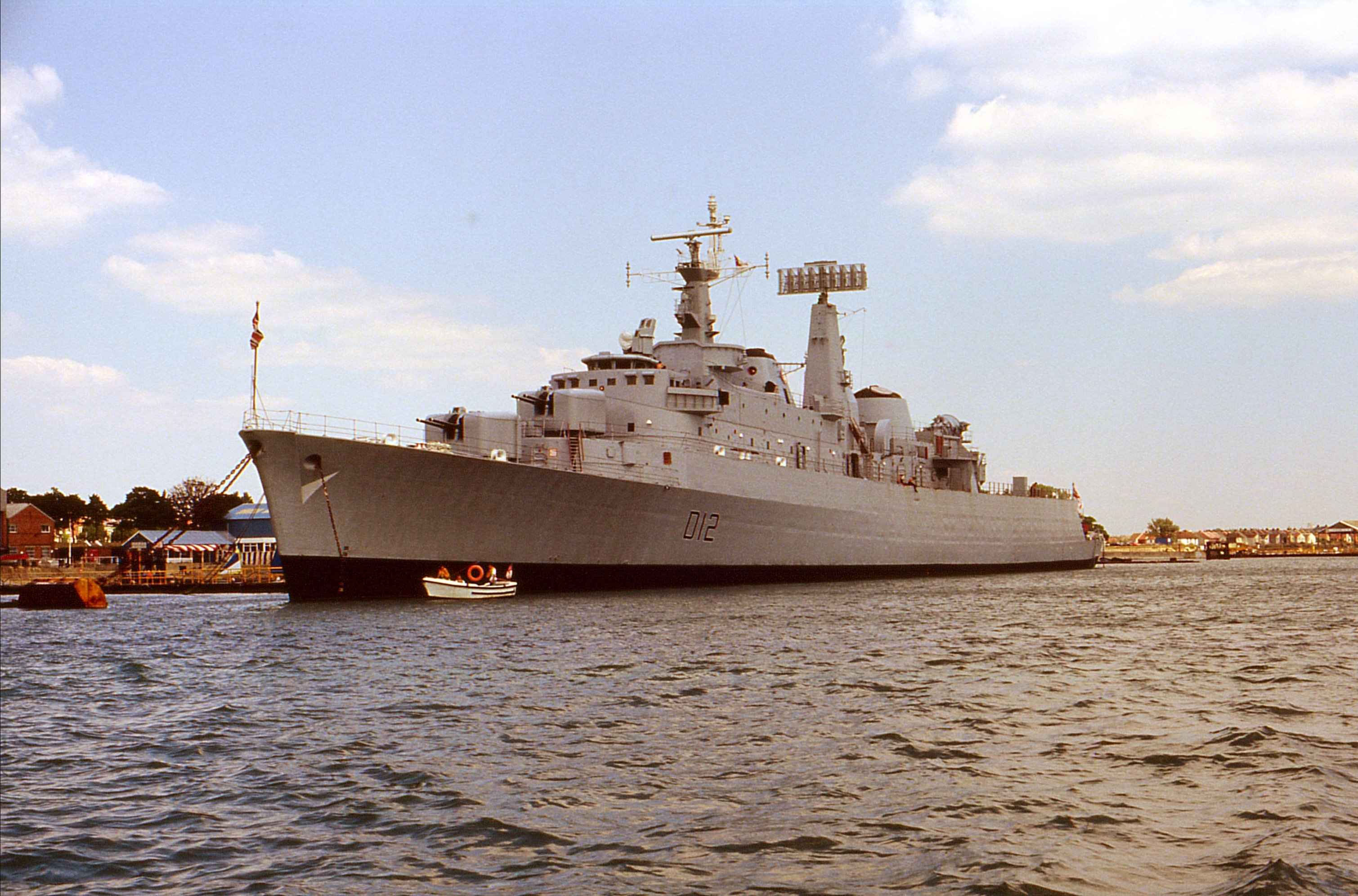
- HMS Kent at Portsmouth in 1989

Class overview
- Name: County class
- Builders: Cammell Laird; Fairfields Shipbuilding; Harland & Wolff; John Brown; Swan Hunter; Upper Clyde Shipbuilders; Vickers-Armstrongs
- Operators: Royal Navy; Chilean Navy; Pakistan Navy
- Preceded by: Daring class
- Succeeded by: Type 82
- Subclasses: Batch 1; Batch 2
- In commission: 16 November 1962 – 22 September 2006
- Completed: 8
- Cancelled: 2
- Laid up: 2
- Lost: 0

General characteristics
- Type: Guided missile destroyer
- Displacement: 6,200 tons
- Length: 520 ft (160 m)
- Beam: 54 ft (16 m)
- Draught: 21 ft (6.4 m)
- Propulsion: COSAG on 2 shafts; 2× Babcock & Wilcox boilers, geared steam turbines, 30,000 shp (22,000 kW); 4× Metrovick G6 gas turbines, 30,000 shp
- Speed: 30 knots (56 km/h; 35 mph)
- Range: 3,500 nautical miles (6,500 km; 4,000 mi)
- Complement: 471 (33 officers, 438 ratings)
- Sensors & processing systems: Type 903 radar (MRS-3 system)
- Armament: 2× fore-mounted twin-gunned turret with 4.5-inch (113 mm) guns Mark N6 (Batch 2's turret "B" was later replaced by 4× MM38 Exocet missile launchers); 2× mountings for Oerlikon 20 mm cannon; 1× aft-mounted Seaslug GWS.1 or GWS.2 surface to air missile system (24 missiles); 2× mountings (port & starboard) for Seacat GWS-22 SAM; 2× triple-tube launchers for shipborne torpedoes
- Aircraft carried: 1× Wessex HAS Mk 3 helicopter
- Aviation facilities: Flight deck and enclosed hangar for embarking one helicopter

The County class was a class of British guided missile destroyers, the first such warships built by the Royal Navy. Designed specifically around the Seaslug anti-aircraft missile system, the primary role of these ships was area air defence around the aircraft carrier task force in the nuclear-war environment.

Eight ships were built and entered service. Two served in the British naval task force in the Falklands War in 1982. After leaving British service, four ships were sold to the Chilean Navy and one to the Pakistan Navy.

== Development ==
A class of ten ships was envisaged in 1958 for about £6–7.5 million each, equivalent to a costed Programme for four large, Seaslug-armed, 15,000-ton cruisers, estimated at £14 million each, based on an upgraded Minotaur-class cruiser (1951), approved for full design in early 1955. The final four County-class ships, with hull numbers 07 to 10, were delayed in 1960 while an anti-submarine escort carrier was considered. Hulls 07 and 08 were approved in 1963 as a temporary stopgap, and the ninth and tenth hulls were cancelled.

The class was designed as a hybrid cruiser-destroyer with dimensions similar to the broad-beam 1951 Dido class. Much larger than predecessors such as the 2,800 ton Daring class. the new County class would be destroyer-leaders for aircraft carrier task forces and when operating "East of Suez" also play a traditional cruiser flagship role with shore bombardment, and attacking enemy shipping. In 1955 the new First Sea Lord Louis Mountbatten specified the development of 4,800 ton Fast fleet escort design (DNC 7/959) with a Seaslug missile replacing a stern twin 3-inch anti-aircraft mounting,. This replacing a 15,000 ton cruiser design which would have combined Seaslug with the Type 984 3D radar and a conventional Tiger-class gun armament.

John Coates, RCNC was appointed as naval architect to design the new County class destroyer in accordance with Lord Mountbatten's directive. He wrote that:

"To keep the ship to a size responding to Lord Mountbatten's directive, demand by specialist interests within the Admiralty had to be strictly controlled, and often curtailed."

During 1956–1958 a full "alternative" gun armament was an option for the new Fast Escort for the fleet based on a modern combined gas turbine and steam turbine (COSAG) propulsion unit and armed with two twin 4.5-inch guns, two twin 40 mm Bofors and a single twin 3-inch gun. A detailed March 1957 study following the Suez Crisis and the 1957 Defence White Paper decided to increase the size of the new missile destroyers to that of light cruisers and include some cruiser features. The study opted for a 505 ft (154 m) long hull with a fit of 18 Seaslug and four nuclear warhead fitted Seaslug for extended range anti-aircraft, anti-missile and anti-ship. Twin 40 mm Bofors were kept due to doubt over the future and effectiveness of the "Green Light" missile then under development. The Limbo mortar was the only anti-submarine weapon.

A revised design in March 1958 added Seaslug and Seacat missiles and a telescoping aircraft hangar. Mountbatten staged an impressive demonstration shoot for flag officers and politicians: the Seaslug test ship HMS Girdle Ness launched ten Seaslugs, including a salvo of two Seaslugs together. The success included hits in the lethal zone of two piston-engine Fairey Firefly radio-controlled drones at 16 km (9.9 mi) flying at a speed of 315-375 mph. This enabled the Minister of Defence Duncan Sandys to gain the approval of the Cabinet Defence Committee for Seaslug production to be approved in 1958.

While the missile worked against level flying targets, the beam guidance system was dubious at range and in rough water and eight fixed stabilisers were added to the design of the County-class. Advocacy for the guided missiles fit was led by Mountbatten and the Cabinet agreed with using the system, despite staff reports over missile unreliability and inaccuracy,. This was confirmed by the dismal performance in the following Seaslug target launches at Woomera range, South Australia in 1959 Many Royal Australian Navy officers felt Seaslug was unsuitable for the RAN.

Final revisions to the design in 1958 were to adopt a high flush deck from B turret, increasing internal space, the cancellation of the nuclear-tipped Seaslug, and provision for folding fins for the Seaslug; this allowed storage of 20 extra missile bodies which could be rapidly assembled. Against staff advice, a tight fitting, fixed side-hangar for the anti-submarine Westland Wessex helicopter was added on the insistence of the First Sea Lord. While a flawed layout, it proved usable when tested in the Falklands War in 1982.

Lord Mountbatten classified the County-class as guided missile destroyers with cruisers discredited in the media as colonial relics, obsolete gunships like battleships. The Royal Navy staff and officers regarded the County class as cruisers, and to signify that they were major surface units, they were given names previously carried by cruisers including the preceding County-class heavy cruisers and First World War armoured cruisers. The County-class differed from cruisers, as these ships were unarmoured and fitted to destroyer standards, except for staff accommodation and a short ranged, semi automatic, 4.5 destroyer armament given additional spotting radar. They did provide space and weight for light Bofors and Oerlikons to be fitted if required. The apparently impressive performance of Seaslug against jet Gloster Meteor UC15 drones gave the Royal Navy a number of County-class 'destroyers' and a greater number of ship commands and posts for ambitious officers.

While short on the support and logistic spares stocks of a traditional cruiser, they were envisaged by the Director of Naval Construction as being 'probably' used in the cruiser role with space for Flag staff offices, and admiral's barge accommodation in the 1960s: the last decade when the UK oversaw significant colonial territory East of Suez. Its missile capability had been overtaken by aircraft development by 1962–63, when HMS Devonshire and Hampshire entered service, but in the early and mid-1960s the modern lines of these guided-missile destroyers, with their traditional RN cruiser style and their impressive-looking missiles, enabled the overstretched Royal Navy to project sufficient power to close down the threat of a militant, left-leaning Indonesia to Malaysia and Borneo during the Indonesia-Malaysia confrontation. Indonesia was not impressed and spent the early 1960s building up an anti-carrier force of Tupolev Tu-16 bombers armed with KS-1 Komet cruise missiles, the very combination Seaslug could not catch.

== Seaslug missile ==
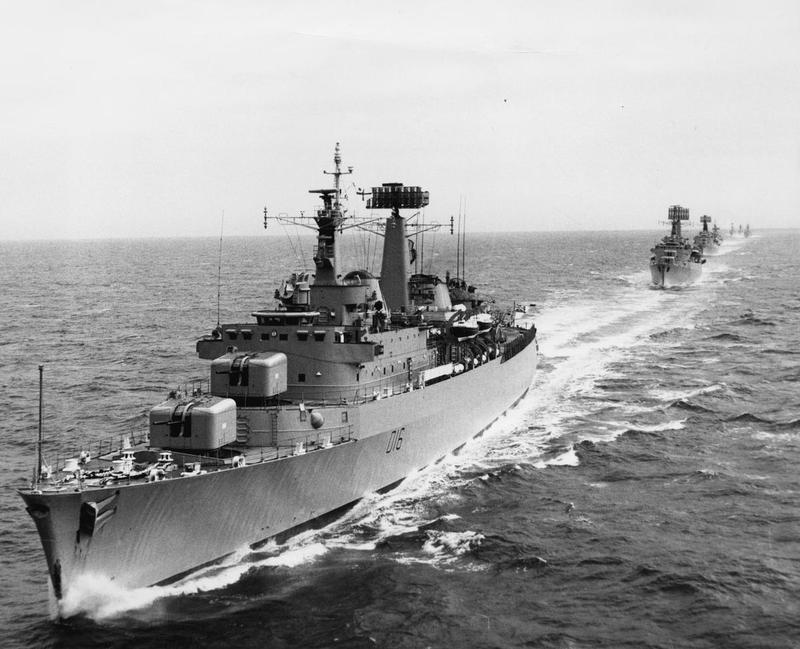
London leads Antrim and Norfolk during exercises in 1971

The County class was designed around the GWS1 Seaslug beam riding anti-aircraft missile system. Seaslug was a first-generation surface-to-air missile intended to hit high-flying nuclear-armed bombers and surveillance aircraft like the Tupolev Tu-16 "Badger" and Tupolev Tu-95 "Bear", which could direct strikes against the British fleet from missile destroyers and cruise missile-armed submarines. The Tu 95 and the improved Tupolev Tu-142 were demanding targets for a missile like Seaslug; the long-range Soviet turboprop aircraft flew at an altitude of 7.5 mi (40,000 ft; 12,100 m), at 572 mph (921 km/h) and were barely within the engagement capability of Seaslug. In 1956 during the first integrated trials of Sea Slug on HMS Girdle Ness cancellation of Seaslug was considered. The RAF found Seaslug could not cover low and high level targets and was only marginally capable on subsonic targets at 3–10 miles and height of 1–7 miles, and not effective against modern V Bomber, English Electric Canberra and Soviet Il-28 type aircraft which were likely to be used in a 1956 Suez confrontation. The missile was obsolete in many Admirals and MPs views compared the USN Terrier missile, the RAF Bristol Bloodhound and the British Army's Thunderbird semi-active homing missiles in service by 1958. CNS, Mountbatten and Vice Admiral Reid, saw it as 'deplorable' that Sea Slug was so far behind due to the lack of engineers and higher priority for Korea but it was essential to Royal Navy and UK credibility and independence to continue with Sea Slug. A new British missile or adoption of the Terrier Mk11 or Thunderbird would take too long. The improved Mark 2 version of Seaslug had 10,000 ft (3000 m) greater altitude and speed.

The Seaslug system was a large weapon. Each missile was 6 m (19 ft 8 in) long and weighed two tons; its handling arrangements and electronics systems were also large; so even fitting a single system aboard a ship the size of the Counties was a challenge. The missiles were stowed horizontally in a long unarmoured magazine which was sited above the waterline and took up a great deal of internal space. The risk of fire near the magazine was checked by an automatic sprinkler system. In order to increase the number of missiles that could be carried, on the last four ships, some of the missiles were stored partly disassembled in the forward end of the magazine. Their wings and fins would be reattached before being moved into the aft sections of the handling spaces and eventually loaded onto the large twin launcher for firing.

The limitations of the beam riding guidance method and lack of a homing head, meant the Mk 1 and 2 Seaslug were intended to have nuclear variants - the much larger blast compensating for lack of accuracy. However nuclear warhead for Mk 1 Seaslug (for the first group of ships) was dropped as it needed extra crew, space and security which were not available on the smaller hull; development of the nuclear warhead for Seaslug on the second group of ships was cancelled in June 1962, to reduce the naval budget, and the RNs requirement below 334 tactical nuclear warheads.

The County-class and the Seaslug missile were interim solutions and the new Sea Dart anti-aircraft missile would have speed and accuracy to ensure a hit without requiring a nuclear warhead. Mountbatten doubted the usefulness of tactical nuclear weapons by 1962, due to escalation theories, scientific advice and greater evidence of fallout consequences, leading to the Partial Nuclear Test Ban Treaty in 1963. There were also staff and space difficulties with carrying nuclear warheads on confined destroyers. As early as 1952, Air Chief Marshal John Slessor, the most influential defence Advisor to Winston Churchill, considered the Navy irrelevant in a nuclear war. He defined the role of RN as "uncertain". The collapse of the 1956 Suez operation and the huge impact of the British hydrogen bomb tests in 1954-57 led to the 1957 review of Britain's defences, reliance on nuclear deterrence by strategic aircraft, missiles and missile submarines and doubt that a nuclear war would last long enough to require trans-Atlantic convoys. Corresponding doubt whether major conventional war was still possible on the basis of the last 1954-5 HC speeches of Churchill and Eisenhower, justified large cutbacks of British and American large ship, destroyer and carrier programmes and the future role and relevance of the Royal Navy was "unclear" moving the RN to more limited East of Suez task forces with gun and Seaslug- and Seacat-armed destroyers escorting medium British aircraft carriers with only a limited nuclear strike capacity against ships and cities equipped with Blackburn Buccaneer S.1 (and then the improved S.2) strike aircraft mainly aimed to deter regional powers such as Indonesia. Early versions of the equivalent US missile system RIM-2 Terrier, like Seaslug, relied on beam riding and needed a nuclear warhead variant to compensate for inaccuracy at low level and range. However, by 1962, the US was concentrating on the medium range radar guided RIM-24 Tartar and long range RIM-8 Talos, which had success against long range North Vietnamese aircraft from 1968. The Royal Air Force's semi-active land-based Bristol Bloodhound was unrelated to Seaslug development, but drew top scientists away from RN work.

== Design ==
John Coates, RCNC was appointed as naval architect to design the new County class destroyer in accordance with Lord Mountbatten's directive. He wrote that:

"To carry enough missiles to justify the cost of even the smaller ship, the missile magazine had to be extended over all the propelling machinery spaces, right through the middle of the ship, high in the hull. The design became volume determined, around the rigid spatial framework of the Seaslug system and storage spaces. The latter had also caused the other ships spaces to be zoned in function horizontally instead of vertically, which is more usual and convenient in warships and merchant ships alike."

The very large and intrusive Seaslug missile system raised material new system complexity that needed to be addressed in the design phase. Coates wrote:

"The designers decided to integrate the design in more detail than previously attempted, before working drawings were developed by the lead shipbuilder. Particular attention was given to ship's services to ensure not only their proper design but also that they would run without expensive congestion or complication, and without interfering with equipment, structures of free passage of personnel.

Early drawings showing all services were made, so that likely interferences could be identified and resolved. In particular, considerable effort was made by Hutchins and his team to develop a new, and simplified, electrical drawing presentation which also enabled every electrical cable in the ship to be uniquely numbered for the first time.

It then became clear that the whole arrangement of the ship, services and internal movement, as well as it structure, survivability and protection from nuclear attack could be improved at negligible cost if the main hull was increased by one deck over most of its length, much increasing the number of missiles which could be stowed. At the same time the superstructure could be reduced to those features which by function must be above the main hull, with the single exception of the officer's accommodation.

The Class became the first modern escort to follow aircraft carriers in minimising superstructure; possibly because the both had hangar like stowages with them. This change enabled the Operations Room to be accommodated well down in the hull, a position often since advocated in many navies but rarely achieved. The more capacious hull together with firm control of the design details enable to exterior of the ship to be kept exceptionally simple and uncluttered."

The Seaslug missile system also raised significant and new ship safety issues. Coates wrote:

"Such a radical departure in the stowage of explosives in HM Ships called for the introduction of a constantly pressurised and automatic water spray system, and other new safety measures and devices offset the lack of armour protection inherent in the destroyer concept."

The County-class design attempted to give maximum protection from nuclear fallout. The operation rooms, where the ship was fought from, was located deep in the ship five decks below the bridge with a lift connecting it to the latter, which maintained some duplicated command systems. The operations room had the main radar, sonar and electronic warfare screens, and communication data and computer links. The electronics required for the Seaslug were the large Type 901 fire-control radar and the Type 965 air-search radar. These required a great deal of weight to be carried high up on the ship which affected the ship layout. Although superior the Type 984 radar was rejected as it was even heavier and would excluded fitting a twin turret 4.5-inch armament forward which was needed for gunfire support or action against surface vessels. It was hoped that RN carriers with Type 984 would provide primary air targeting for the destroyers through a datalink. According to a RN naval architect, "Sea Slug did not live up to expectations" and was obsolete by 1957. The compromises required by the heavy and dated Seaslug system detracted from the success and popularity of an otherwise advanced ship design. Its ineffectiveness and vulnerable magazine and missile fuel reduced confidence in the class, which had potential as command ships, having good seaworthiness, speed and in the group two ships a spacious operations room with ADAWS.

In 1960, because US-designed missiles were seen at the time to be superior to the Seaslug, the Royal Australian Navy (RAN) proposed a variation of the County-class armed with the US Tartar missile and two additional modifications: hangar space for three Westland Wessex helicopters and a steam propulsion system, rather than the combined steam and gas system used in the County class. However, the RAN instead decided to proceed with the Perth class (a modified version of the US Charles F. Adams class). Two different reasons have been put forward for the Australian decision: according to an Australian history, British authorities would not allow a steam-propelled variant of the county, whereas, according to a British account, the re-design required to accommodate the Tartar missile would have taken longer than the RAN was prepared to accept.

The US Terrier missile had some support amongst the RN staff but consideration was not given to acquiring it for the second batch of four ships, as the County class were "shop windows" for advanced UK technology, and it was vital for the British missile and aerospace industry to continue the Sea Slug project, to allow the development of the much improved Sea Dart missile. Following problems with the original version, a reworked Action Data Automation Weapon System (ADAWS) was successfully trialled on HMS Norfolk in 1970. In the mid-1960s the County-class destroyers were assets; their impressive appearance and data links, feeding off the carriers' Type 984 radar, projected effective capability during the Indonesia–Malaysia confrontation. The Mark 1 Seaslug was operationally reliable and proved useful as a missile target for the new Sea Dart missiles in the late 1970s and early 1980s; the supersonic Mark 2 version proved less effective for this. There are questions as to whether it was ever fully operational and there were problems with missiles breaking up when the boosters separated. Inaccuracy, primitive beam-riding guidance and lack of infrared homing or a proximity fuze in the Mk 1 made it of limited value. Short-range air defence was provided by the GWS-22 Seacat anti-aircraft missile system, which made the Counties the first Royal Navy warships to be armed with two different types of guided missile.

=== Batch 2 improvements ===
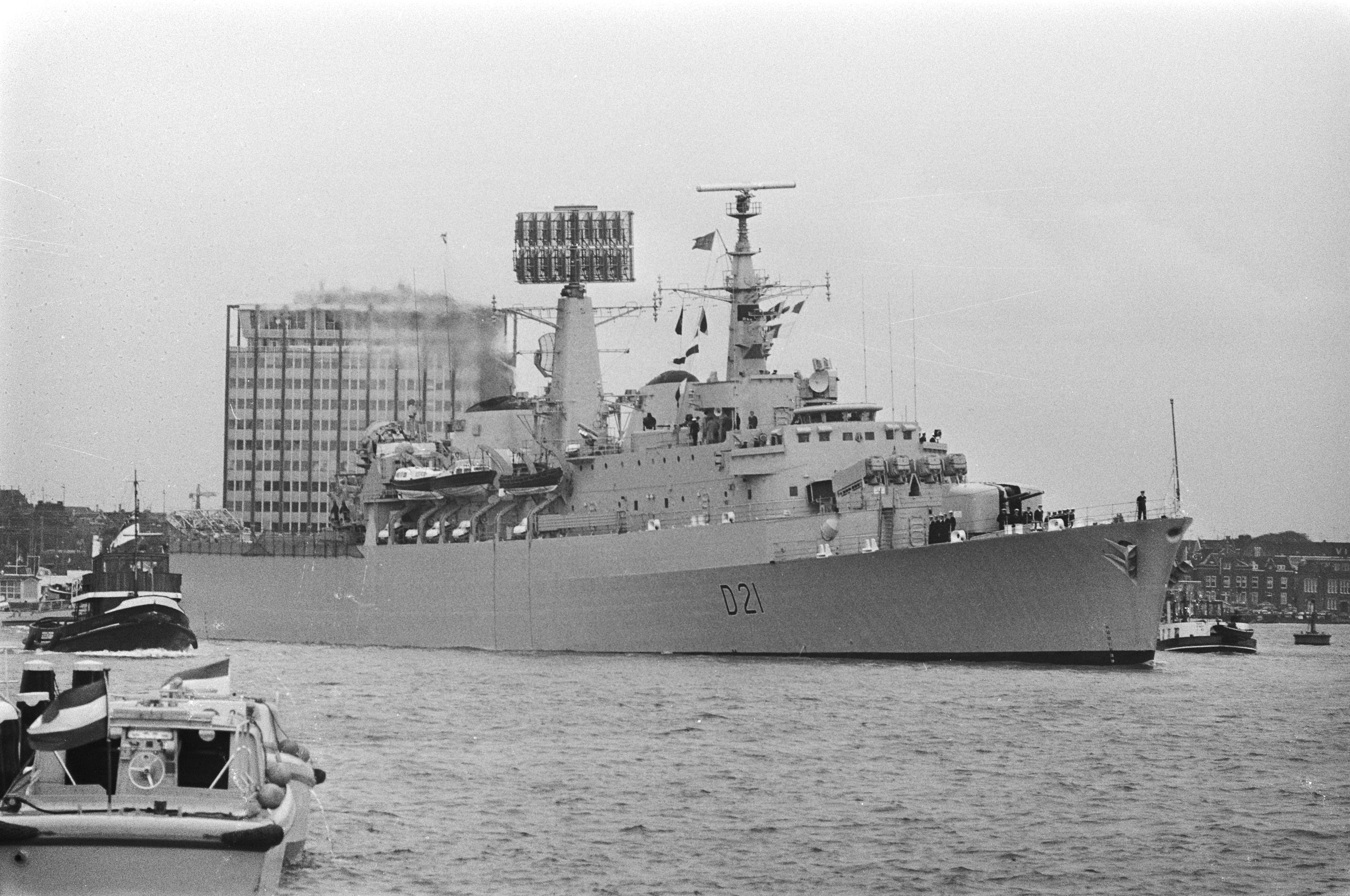
HMS Norfolk, a Batch 2 ship, following modification that removed the 'B' turret and replaced it with four Exocet launcher boxes

The second four Counties had improved air warning and target indicator radar ("double bedstead" 965M and a revised 992 for closer range tracking rather than only surface warning). The revised Seaslug Mk2 was supposedly effective against supersonic and surface targets at up to 30 km. ADAWS command and control system could process and prioritise air targets detected by the 965 and 992 radar and other so fitted RN warships. This was important as the Type 984 3D processing system on the carriers Victorious, Hermes and Eagle were removed from 1967 to 1972, affecting the first four County class ships which depended on datalinks to the carrier systems for primary radar and targeting processing of Seaslug.

As constructed, the County-class ships were armed with a pair of twin QF 4.5-inch gun mountings. These had magazines for 225 shells for each gun, two-thirds of the magazine capacity for the same guns in the single-turreted Leander-class frigates. The second batch of four ships (Antrim, Fife, Glamorgan and Norfolk) were refitted in the mid-1970s – their 'B' turrets were removed and replaced by four single MM38 Exocet surface-to-surface anti-ship-missile launcher boxes in order to increase the fleet's anti-ship capability following retirement of its aircraft carriers. This made the County-class ships the only Royal Navy ships to be fitted with three separate types of guided missile: Seaslug, Seacat and Exocet.

=== Possible development ===
It was suggested by Vosper Thornycroft that the Counties could have been developed for the anti-submarine role by replacing the Seaslug system with a larger hangar and flight deck and the possibility of removing Seaslug and rebuilding the missile tunnel as storage for extra Westland Lynx helicopters. Certainly, these arrangements as originally installed to operate a single Westland Wessex anti-submarine helicopter were problematic, with a hangar so cramped it took an hour to get the aircraft either in or out again, during which the port Seacat launcher was unusable. However it was determined that beam-restrictions would still limit the Counties' helicopter operation in RN service to the obsolescent Wessex, as they were too narrow to handle the far more capable British-built Sea King HAS. The Chilean navy, however, did convert two of the four ships they purchased along these lines.

=== Ships of the class ===
Eight vessels were built in two batches between 1959 and 1970, the later four vessels carrying the improved Seaslug GWS2 and updated electronics requiring rearranged mastheads. The major identifying feature was the Batch 2 vessels' prominent "double-bedstead" AKE-2 antennas of the Type 965 air-search radar, and their taller foremast carrying the Type 992Q low-angle search radar.

=== Ships' names ===
Four of the "Counties" had names which had been used by the famous interwar County-class cruisers: London, Norfolk, Devonshire and Kent. (The last of that class, HMS Cumberland, had survived until 1959 as a trials ship). Devonshire, Hampshire and Antrim had been the names of Devonshire-class armoured cruisers of the First World War.

Four of the new ships were named after counties containing a Royal Navy Dockyard: Devonshire (Devonport Dockyard), Hampshire (Portsmouth Dockyard), Kent (Chatham Dockyard), and Fife (Rosyth dockyard). Glamorgan and Antrim are the counties in Wales and Northern Ireland which contain the port cities and regional capitals of Cardiff and Belfast (by analogy to London, England). Norfolk is the county of Nelson's birth, and the important 19th-century ports of Great Yarmouth and King's Lynn.

Three of the ships' names have been subsequently re-used: HMS London was a Type 22 frigate. HMS Kent and HMS Norfolk were used for RN Type 23 frigates though in their case after British dukedoms.

	Ship	Builder	Laid down	Launched	Commissioned	Fate
Batch 1	Devonshire	Cammell Laird, Birkenhead	9 March 1959	10 June 1960	15 November 1962	Sunk as target, 17 July 1984
Batch 1	Hampshire	John Brown & Company, Clydebank	26 March 1959	16 March 1961	15 March 1963	Broken up at Briton Ferry, 1979
Batch 1	Kent	Harland & Wolff, Belfast	1 March 1960	27 September 1961	15 August 1963	Broken up at Alang, 1998
Batch 1	London	Swan Hunter, Wallsend	26 February 1960	7 December 1961	4 November 1963	Sold to Pakistan as Babur, March 1982
Batch 2
Batch 2	Fife	Fairfield Shipbuilding, Govan	1 June 1962	9 July 1964	21 June 1966	Sold to Chile as Blanco Encalada, August 1987
Batch 2	Glamorgan	Vickers-Armstrongs, Newcastle	13 September 1962	9 July 1964	14 October 1966	Sold to Chile as Almirante Latorre, September 1986
Batch 2	Antrim	Upper Clyde Shipbuilders, Govan	20 January 1966	19 October 1967	14 July 1970	Sold to Chile as Almirante Cochrane, June 1984
Batch 2	Norfolk	Swan Hunter, Wallsend	15 March 1966	16 November 1967	7 March 1970	Sold to Chile as Capitán Prat, April 1982. Decommissioned from Chilean Navy in 2006 and sold for scrap in 2008

=== Construction programme ===
The ships were built at the major UK yards, with some of the machinery coming from Associated Electrical Industries of Manchester, Parsons Marine Steam Turbine Company of Wallsend-on-Tyne, John I. Thornycroft & Company of Southampton, Yarrows of Glasgow, and the Wallsend Slipway and Engineering Company, Wallsend-on-Tyne.

County-class ships
Pennant	Name	Built by	Ordered	Laid down	Launched	Accepted into service	Commissioned	Estimated building cost (Note: "Unit cost, i.e. excluding cost of certain items (e.g. aircraft, first outfit).")
D02	Devonshire	Cammell Laird, Birkenhead	24 January 1956	9 March 1959	10 June 1960	November 1962	15 November 1962	£14,080,000
D06	Hampshire	John Brown & Company, Clydebank	27 January 1956	26 March 1959	16 March 1961	March 1963	15 March 1963	£12,625,000<
D12	Kent	Harland & Wolff, Belfast	6 February 1957	1 March 1960	27 September 1961	August 1963	15 August 1963	£13,650,000
D16	London	Swan Hunter, Wallsend-on-Tyne	6 February 1957	26 February 1960	7 December 1961	November 1963	14 November 1963	£13,900,000
D20	Fife	Fairfields, Glasgow	26 September 1961	1 June 1962	9 July 1964	June 1966	21 June 1966	£15,250,000
D19	Glamorgan	Vickers Shipbuilding, Newcastle	26 September 1961	13 September 1962	9 July 1964	October 1966	11 October 1966	£14,100,000
D21	Norfolk	Swan Hunter	5 January 1965	15 March 1966	16 November 1967	February 1970	7 March 1970	£16,900,000
D18	Antrim	Upper Clyde Shipbuilders, Govan	5 January 1965	20 January 1966	19 October 1967	November 1970	14 July 1970	£16,350,000

== Service in the Royal Navy ==
HMS Devonshire (D78)

Commissioned on 15 November 1962 as the first of the class, she served with the Home and Mediterranean Fleets, frequently deploying with NATO's Standing Naval Force Atlantic (STANAVFORLANT) and taking part in multinational exercises such as 'Dawn Patrol' and 'Ocean Safari'. She underwent several upgrades, including enhancements to her Seaslug missile system and Type 965 radar, and in 1978 became a trials platform for the new Sea Wolf system. Devonshire was decommissioned in 1981 and sunk as a target in 1984.

HMS Hampshire (D06)

Commissioned in 1967, she operated extensively with NATO and undertook multiple deployments in the North Atlantic, Caribbean, and Mediterranean. She also took part in the Beira Patrol enforcing the oil blockade against Rhodesia. In 1969, she sustained damage from a machinery room fire and underwent a major repair. Hampshire was withdrawn from service in 1976, used as a trials ship until 1979, then laid up before being sold for scrap in 1989.

HMS Kent (D12)

Commissioned in 1963, she served with the Home Fleet and completed extended deployments in the Mediterranean, Caribbean, and Far East. She was involved in major NATO exercises such as 'Teamwork' and provided naval gunfire support during training operations. Her refits included improvements to radar, sonar, and the ship's communication systems. She also represented the Royal Navy during the Coronation celebrations in Ethiopia in 1966. Kent was paid off in 1980 to become a harbour training ship until the mid 1990s, finally being broken up in 1998.

HMS London (D16)

Commissioned in 1963, she was the first County-class destroyer to be completed. She saw service with the Home and Far East Fleets, including a major deployment to the Far East between 1966 and 1968 as part of Britain's presence 'East of Suez'. She took part in the withdrawal from Aden in 1967. Modernisation in the 1970s saw updates to her sensors, missile systems, and electronic warfare equipment. After serving as a training ship later in her career, sold to Pakistan on 23 March 1982 serving as PNS Babur.

HMS Fife (D20)

HMS Fife was commissioned in 1966 as the first of the Batch 2 group. She featured an enlarged hangar and flight deck to operate the Westland Wessex helicopter. Fife served with both the Home and Far East Fleets, notably visiting ports in the Pacific and Indian Oceans during deployments. She was the flagship of the First Flotilla in the mid-1970s. In 1980–81, she was converted into a mobile headquarters ship with her missile launcher removed. She was sold to Chile as Blanco Encalada in August 1987.

HMS Glamorgan (D19)

Commissioned in 1966, she had a long and active career. She served extensively in the Mediterranean and Far East, participated in NATO exercises, and undertook global deployments. In 1982, she was part of the task force sent to recover the Falkland Islands. Glamorgan was decommissioned in September 1986 and sold to Chile, where she served as Almirante Latorre until 1998.

HMS Norfolk (D21)

Commissioned in 1970, she served in Cold War patrols, often operating in the Arctic Circle and North Atlantic. She was fitted with the Ikara ASW missile system in place of the Seaslug, like Hampshire. Norfolk was involved in major NATO exercises and flag missions across the globe. In 1975, she shadowed Soviet naval movements in the Norwegian Sea. After an extended refit in the early 1980s, she was sold to Chile as Capitán Prat, in April 1982.

HMS Antrim (D18)

Was commissioned in 1970 and served as flagship of the South Atlantic Task Group during the 1982 Falklands War. She had conducted deployments to the Mediterranean, Caribbean and Indian Ocean. She was decommissioned in 1984 and sold to Chile the same year, serving as Almirante Cochrane until 2006.

== 1982 Falklands War service ==
=== HMS Antrim ===
Antrim served as the flagship for Operation Paraquet, the British task force tasked with recapturing South Georgia from Argentine forces. Arriving off South Georgia in late March 1982, Antrim coordinated the amphibious assault launched on 21 April 1982.

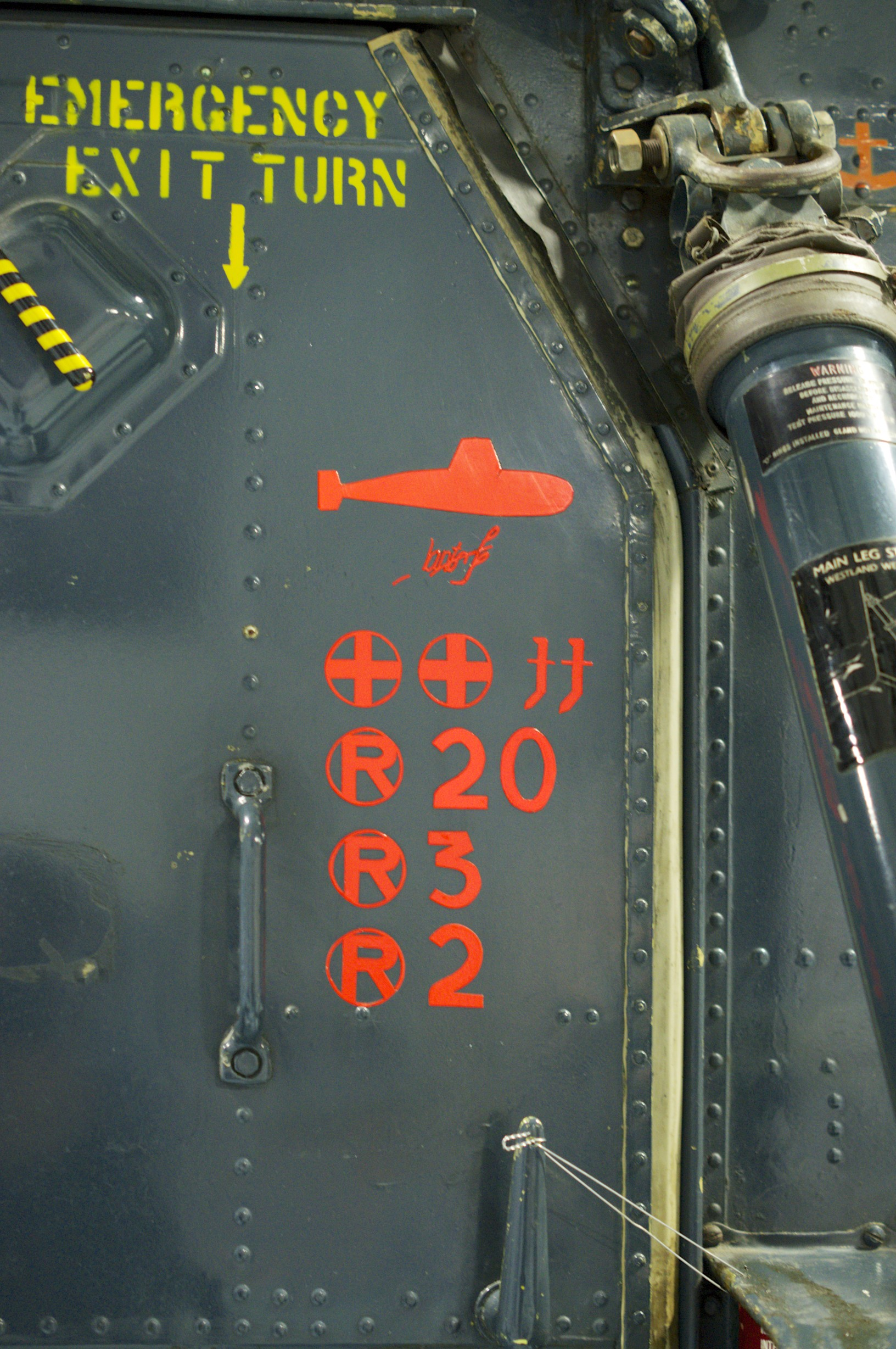
Wessex XP142 Humphrey at the Fleet Air Arm Museum

Her embarked Westland Wessex HAS Mk 3 helicopter (XP142, "Humphrey") rescued 16 Special Air Service (SAS) personnel stranded on Fortuna Glacier on 22 April. On 25 April 1982, the Wessex located and attacked Santa Fe using depth charges, inflicting serious damage. The submarine was later attacked by helicopters from HMS Brilliant (F90) and HMS Plymouth (F126), forcing her back to Grytviken, where she was abandoned by her crew and captured. This was the first ever anti-submarine operation successfully conducted exclusively by helicopters.

During the amphibious landings at San Carlos Water (21 to 25 May), Antrim provided naval gunfire support and acted as the flagship of the task group. On 25 May 1982, Antrim was struck by a 1,000 lb (450 kg) bomb dropped by Argentine aircraft. Although the bomb penetrated her deck, it failed to detonate and she continued operations after temporary repairs.

Antrim's 4.5-inch Mk V guns fired ~400 rounds during the campaign, in support of ground troops around San Carlos and during bombardments of Argentine positions on East Falkland. Her Wessex helicopter (XP142) is preserved at the Fleet Air Arm Museum, RNAS Yeovilton in Somerset, with mission tallies marking its operational achievements: ARA Santa Fe sunk, two CASEVACs, two Special Forces insertions, three rescues, with the number of personnel saved.

=== HMS Glamorgan ===
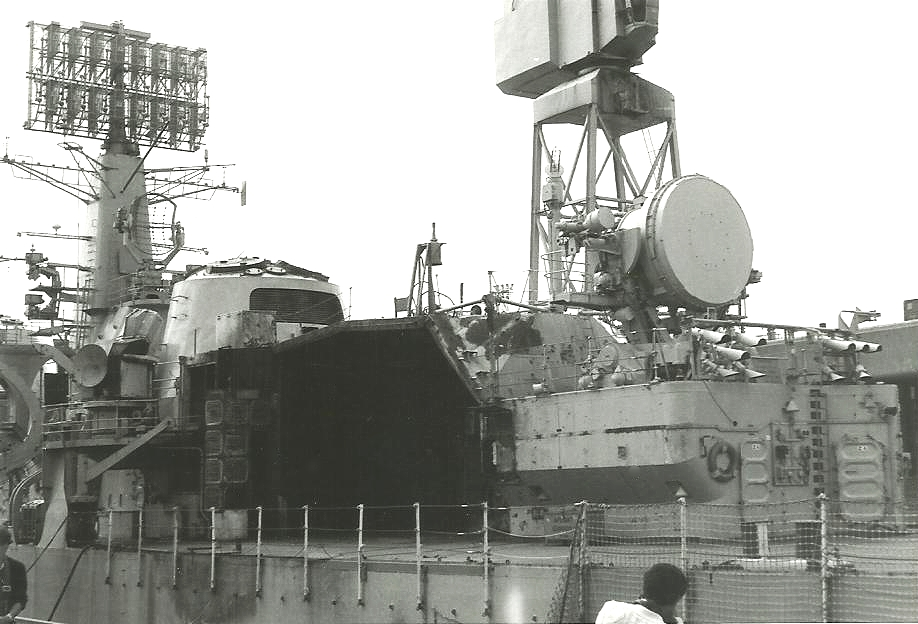
Damage to the hangar from an Argentine Exocet missile

Glamorgan was assigned to the "gunline" off the Falklands, providing sustained naval gunfire support to British ground forces attacking Argentine positions, especially around Port Stanley airfield. During the gunline deployment in early to mid-June, Glamorgan fired over 1,000 4.5-inch shells against Argentine forces.

On the night of 12 June, Glamorgan was struck by an Exocet missile launched from an Argentine Navy tractor-mounted launcher positioned on the coast at Port Pleasant. The missile destroyed the ship's helicopter (XM837), hangar and port-side Seacat missile launcher. Prompt action by the navigating officer, Lieutenant Commander Huxtable, averted a direct hit on her Seaslug missile magazine by manoeuvring to present her stern.

The attack caused extensive flooding, fires and structural damage. Fourteen crew members were killed. Despite severe damage, Glamorgan remained afloat and was underway with all fires extinguished by 11:00.

== Service in the Pakistan Navy ==
Babur (ex-HMS London)

Sold to the Pakistan Navy in March 1982 and recommissioned as Babur. She retained her original armament and sensors, including the Sea Slug missile system and Type 965 radar, and operated with an Alouette III helicopter in place of the Wessex. Primarily used for training and surface patrols, she was decommissioned in 1993 and scrapped in 1995.

== Service in the Chilean Navy ==
Blanco Encalada (ex-HMS Fife)

Transferred to the Chilean Navy in August 1987 and renamed Blanco Encalada. She was refitted with her Seaslug missile system removed, the quarterdeck extended and a larger hangar constructed. The rebuild was completed in May 1988. In 1996 her Sea Cat launchers were removed and she was fitted with the Barak SAM. Blanco Encalada was decommissioned in December 2003 and scrapped.

Almirante Latorre (ex-HMS Glamorgan)

Transferred to Chile in late 1986 and commissioned as Almirante Latorre in early 1987. She initially retained her Seaslug system, which was later removed during a major refit. The launcher was replaced by extended helicopter facilities, her command spaces were upgraded and the ADAWS combat system was replaced with the Chilean SISDEF-100. She served as a flagship and training vessel until decommissioning in 1998. The ship was stripped for spares and scrapped in 2005.

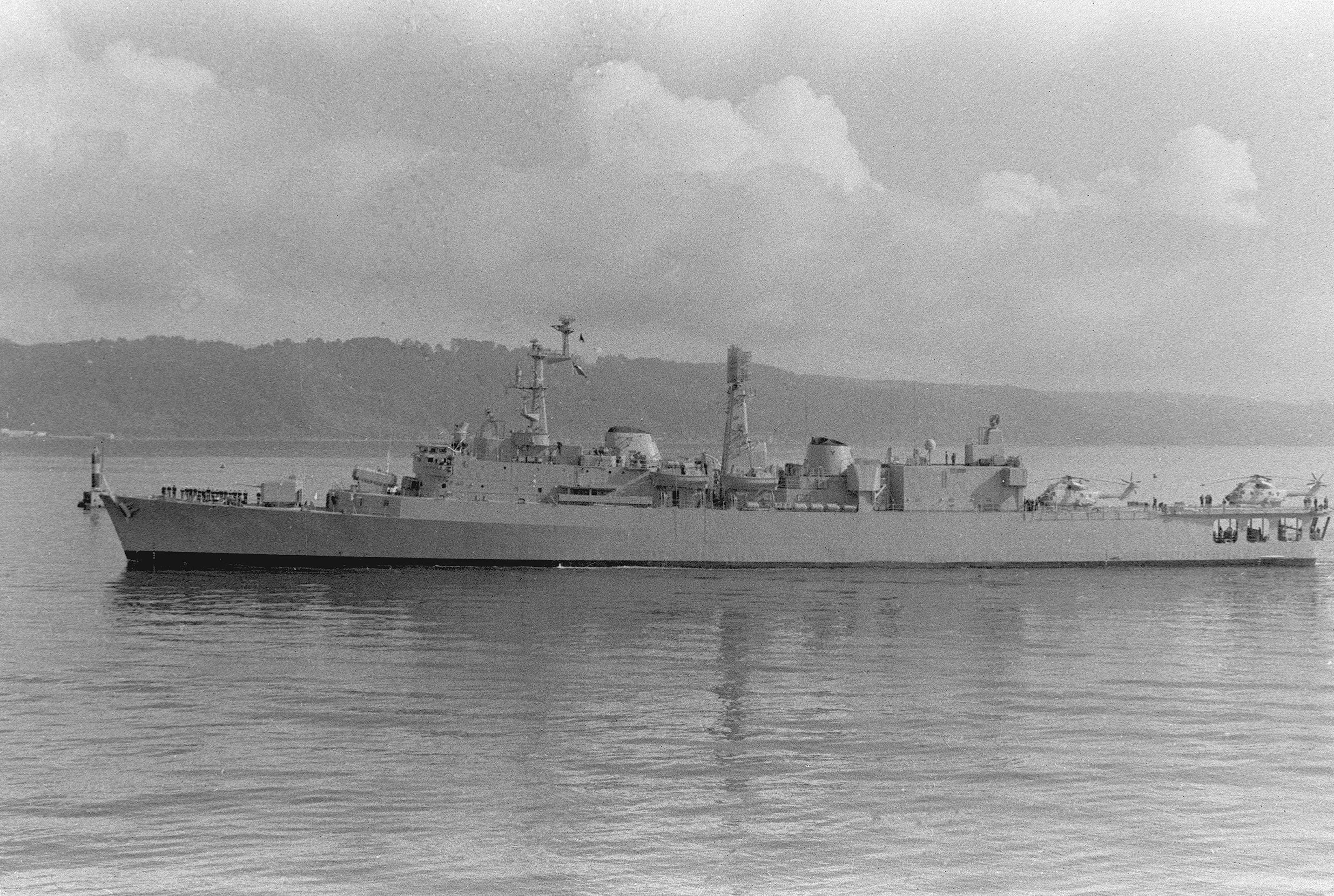
Chilean Navy County-class destroyer Almirante Cochrane

Almirante Cochrane (ex-HMS Antrim)

Entered service in 1984 as Almirante Cochrane. The ship retained her Wessex hangar and deck, which suited Chilean requirements. In 1996 she was modernised with Barak SAMs replacing her Sea Cat launchers, and most of her original sensors were retained. Cochrane remained operational until decommissioning in 2006 and was later used as a static training ship. She was scrapped in 2010.

Capitán Prat (ex-HMS Norfolk)

Entered service on 6 April 1982 and renamed Capitán Prat, after Arturo Prat, commander of the Chilean ship Esmeralda during the War of the Pacific. In 1996 her Sea Cat launchers were removed and replaced with the Barak SAM, and in 2001 her Seaslug system was removed and she was refitted as a helicopter destroyer operating a Cougar attack helicopter. She was decommissioned in August 2006 and scrapped in Mexico.

== Costs ==
=== Running costs ===
Date	Running cost	What is included
1972–73	£500,000	Average annual maintenance cost per vessel for County-class destroyers
1981–82	£7.0 million	Average annual running cost of County-class destroyers at average 1981–82 prices and including associated aircraft costs but excluding the costs of major refits.

=== Cost of major refits ===
In 1974, the costs of the major refits for County-class ships was given as £5½ million – £8 million.

=== Disposal ===
All eight of the class had short Royal Navy careers, serving on average less than 16 years. Only London of the first batch would serve further (transferred to Pakistan) while the other three Batch 1 ships were decommissioned by 1980 with Hampshire being immediately scrapped in 1977 after cannibalization for spares, and Devonshire sunk in weapons testing in 1984. Kent would serve as a floating (though immobile) accommodation and training ship in Portsmouth harbour until 1996. The four ships of Batch 2 however would be operated for 16 to 23 more years after sale to the Chilean Navy, in which they all received extensive upgrades and modernisation.

== See also ==
- List of destroyer classes

Equivalent destroyers of the same era

- Charles F. Adams class
- Kashin class
- Perth class
- Impavido class

== Sources ==
- Brown, D. K.; Moore, G. (2003). Rebuilding the Royal Navy: Warship Design Since 1945. Chatham Publishing. ISBN 978-184832-150-2.
- Friedman, N. (2006). British Destroyers and Frigates: The Second World War and After. London: Chatham Publishing. ISBN 1-86176-137-6.
- Hall, N. (May 2008). "County Class Missile Destroyers". Ships Monthly. pp. 48–51. ISSN 0037-394X.
- Hall, N. (December 2008). "County Class Missile Destroyers, HMS London role in Confrontation and Aden crisis as HMS Eagle escort 65-7". Ships Monthly. pp. 50–51. ISSN 0037-394X.
- Inskip, Ian (2002). Ordeal by Exocet: HMS Glamorgan and the Falklands War. Chatham. ISBN 1-86176-197-X.
- Marland, P. (2016). "Postwar AIO & Command Systems in the Royal Navy". In Jordan, John (ed.). Warship 2016. Conway Maritime Press. pp. 76–98. ISBN 978-1-84486-326-6.
- Marriott, Leo (1989). Royal Navy Destroyers Since 1945. Shepperton, UK: Ian Allan. ISBN 0-7110-1817-0.
- Moore, G. (2005). "From Daring to Devonshire". In Jordan, John (ed.). Warship 2005. Conway Maritime Press. ISBN 1-84486-003-5.
- Lord Earl Mountbatten (1989). Ziegler, Philip (ed.). From Shore to Shore: The Final Years. The Tour Diaries of Earl Mountbatten of Burma, 1953–1979. London: Collins. ISBN 0-00-217606-8.
- Preston, A. (1980). Warships of the World. London: Janes. p. 103. ISBN 0-7106-0020-8 – via Internet Archive.
- Purvis, M.K., 'Post War RN Frigate and Guided Missile Destroyer Design 1944-1969', Transactions, Royal Institution of Naval Architects (RINA), 1974
- Wise, Jon (2007). "Girdle Ness: Seaslug Missile Trials". In Jordan, John (ed.). Warship 2007. Conway Maritime Press. ISBN 978-1-84486-041-8.
- Wilson, Ben (2013). Empire of the Deep. London: Weidenfeld & Nicolson. pp. 624–627. ISBN 978-0-297-86408-0.
- Seldon, A. (1981), Churchill Indian Summer. Conservative Government 1951-5, London: Hodder & Stoughton
- Grove, E. (2005), "The RN Guided Missile", in Harding, R. (ed.), Royal Navy 1930–2000. Innovation and Defence, NY & London: F. Case/ Routeledge
- McCart, Neil (2014). The County class Guided Missile Destroyers. Liskeard, Cornwall: Maritime Press. ISBN 978-1-904459-63-7.
