= F86 =

F86 may refer to:

== Ship pennant numbers ==
- HMS Campbeltown (F86), a Royal Navy frigate decommissioned in 2011
- HMS Corfu (F86), a Royal Mail Ship and ocean liner requisitioned by the British Admiralty for the Second World War
- HMS Mull Of Kintyre, a Royal Navy repair ship in service from 1945 to 1969
- HMS Pelican (L86), a Royal Navy sloop assigned pennant number F86 after the Second World War
- HMS Telemachus (1917), a Royal Navy destroyer initially assigned pennant number F86
- HMS Valkyrie (1917), a Royal Navy flotilla leader whose pennant number was F86 from January to June 1918
- Spanish frigate Canarias

== Transportation ==
- F86, a second-generation model of the BMW X6 SUV
- Volvo F86, a series of trucks built by Volvo from 1965 to 1979
- F86, a model of Hanomag F-series truck
- F86, FAA location ID for Caldwell Parish Airport, Caldwell Parish, Louisiana, United States

== Other uses ==
- F86, observatory code for Moana Observatory, Tahiti - see List of observatory codes
- F86, catalog number of a Antonio Rosetti antiphon (short chant)

== See also ==
- North American F-86 Sabre, a transonic jet fighter aircraft
