= RFA Retainer =

1954 Retainer class armament support ship of the Royal Fleet Auxiliary

History

United Kingdom
- Laid down: 11 October 1948
- Launched: 19 January 1950
- Commissioned: July 1954
- Decommissioned: April 1978
- Identification: IMO number: 5293470
- Fate: Demolished at Barcelona on 29 October 1979

General characteristics
- Displacement: 14,400 tons full load
- Length: 477 ft 2 in (145 m)
- Beam: 62 ft 2 in (19 m)
- Draught: 25 ft .75 in (8 m)
- Propulsion: 6-cylinder Scott-Doxford diesel engine
- Speed: 15 knots
- Aircraft carried: Fitted with a small landing platform

RFA Retainer (A329) was an armament support ship of the Royal Fleet Auxiliary.

Built by Scotts of Greenock as Chungking, a cargo/passenger liner for the China Navigation Co. Both Chungking and her sister vessel Changchow (later RFA Resurgent lost their initial purpose due to the Communist revolution. Chartered for a year and a half to the French Messageries Maritimes, they were purchased by the British Admiralty in 1952.

In 1959, Retainer was used with the missile trials ship HMS Girdle Ness for trials of replenishment at sea with the new Seaslug missile.
