= HMS Mull of Galloway =

Royal Navy repair ship

History

United Kingdom
- Name: HMS Mull Of Galloway (F 26)
- Namesake: Mull of Galloway
- Builder: North Van Ship Repair, North Vancouver
- Laid down: 19 June 1944
- Launched: 26 October 1944
- Commissioned: 15 May 1945; 1954 (re-commissioned)
- Decommissioned: 1950
- Fate: Sold for scrap in 1965

General characteristics
- Class & type: Beachy Head-class
- Type: Heavy repair ship, minesweeper support ship
- Displacement: 8,500 tons
- Length: 441.5 ft (134.6 m)
- Beam: 57.5 ft (17.5 m)
- Draught: 20.3 ft (6.2 m)
- Speed: 11 knots
- Armament: 16 × 20 mm gun

HMS Mull of Galloway (F 26) was a Royal Navy Beachy Head-class repair ship built in 1944. It measured 441.5 ft (134.6 m) long, 57.5 ft (17.5 m) wide, and had a draft of 20.3 ft (6.2 m). The ship displaced 8,500 tons and could steam at 11 knots, and was armed with sixteen 20 mm guns.

== History ==
Mull of Galloway was built by North Vancouver Ship Repair and was launched in October 1944. It was first commissioned by the Royal Navy in May 1945 as a heavy repair ship. In 1947 it was placed into reserve where it acted as the headquarters ship for the Senior Officer Reserve Fleet, Clyde. It was then decommissioned in 1949 for several years, but was re-commissioned in 1954 as a headquarters ship for the Inshore Minesweeping Flotilla. The ship was placed back into reserve in 1957, and then in 1965 it was decommissioned again and sold for scrap. It was towed to Hamburg to be broken up in December 1965.
