= HMS Devonshire (D02) =

1962 County-class guided missile destroyer of the Royal Navy

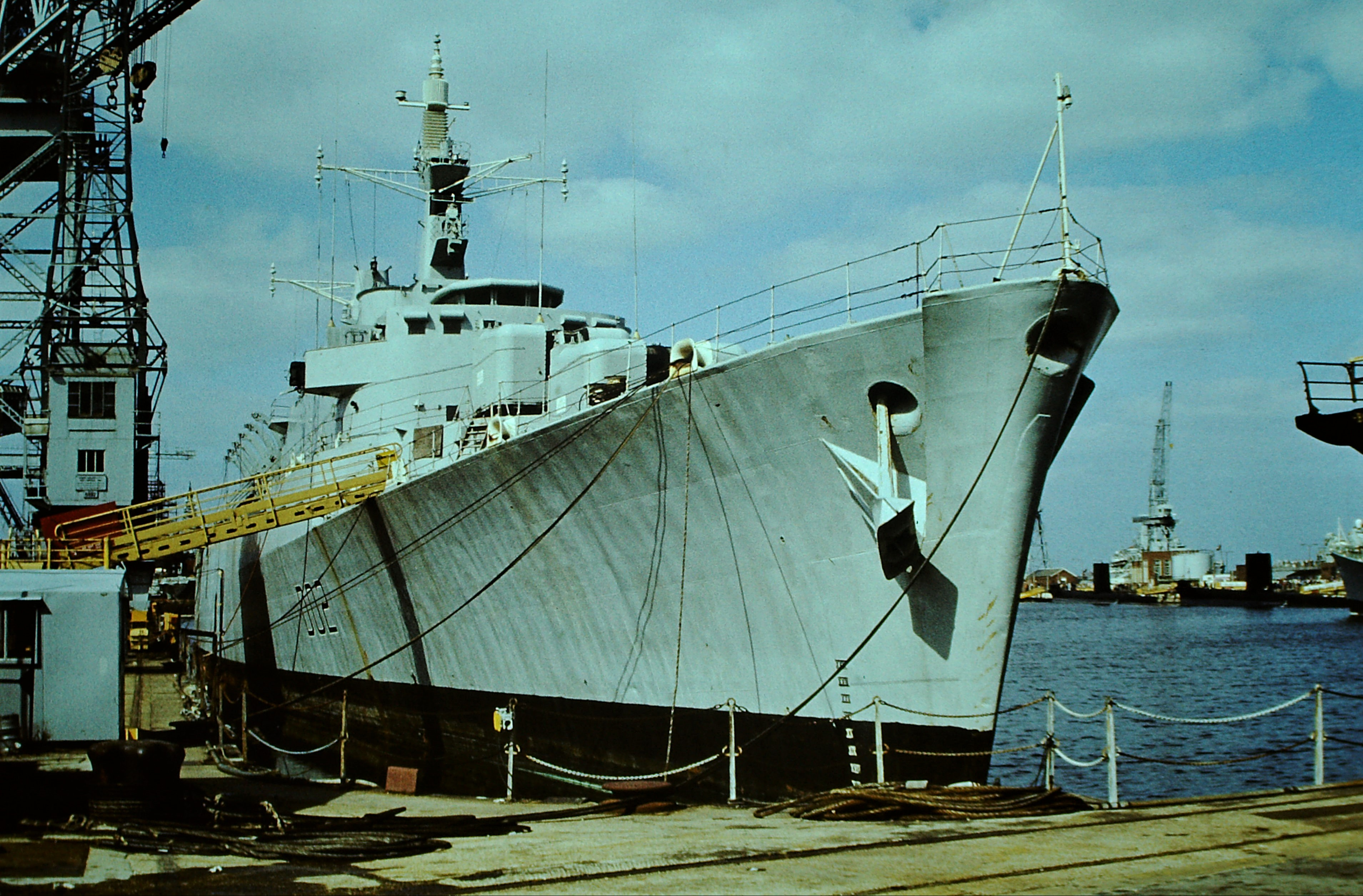
- HMS Devonshire during Portsmouth Navy Day, 1980

History

United Kingdom
- Name: HMS Devonshire
- Ordered: 24 January 1956
- Builder: Cammell Laird
- Laid down: 9 March 1959
- Launched: 10 June 1960
- Commissioned: 15 November 1962
- Decommissioned: 1978
- Identification: Pennant number: D02
- Fate: Sunk as a target on 17 July 1984

General characteristics
- Class & type: County-class destroyer
- Displacement: 6,200 tons full load
- Length: 158.6 m (520 ft 4 in)
- Beam: 53 ft (16 m)
- Draught: 20 ft (6.1 m)
- Propulsion: COSAG (Combined steam and gas) turbines, 2 shafts
- Speed: 31.5 knots (58.3 km/h)
- Range: 3,500 nautical miles (6,500 km)
- Complement: 470
- Armament: 1× Seaslug GWS.2 twin-arm SAM launcher(36 missiles); 2× Seacat GWS.21 twin-arm SAM launcher(60 missiles); 4× 4.5 in (114 mm) /45 DP (2× twin gunned turret); 2× 20 mm AA; 2× triple-tubes for 12¾ inch (324 mm) ASW torpedo
- Aircraft carried: 1× Lynx or Wessex helicopter
- Aviation facilities: Flight deck and enclosed hangar for embarking one helicopter

HMS Devonshire was the first of the County-class destroyers and the first Batch 1 ship of the Royal Navy. The ship was built by Cammell Laird in Birkenhead near Liverpool. With a displacement of 6,200 tons full load, Devonshire was named after the English county of Devon. She was launched on 10 June 1960 and delivered to the navy two years later.

== Operational service ==
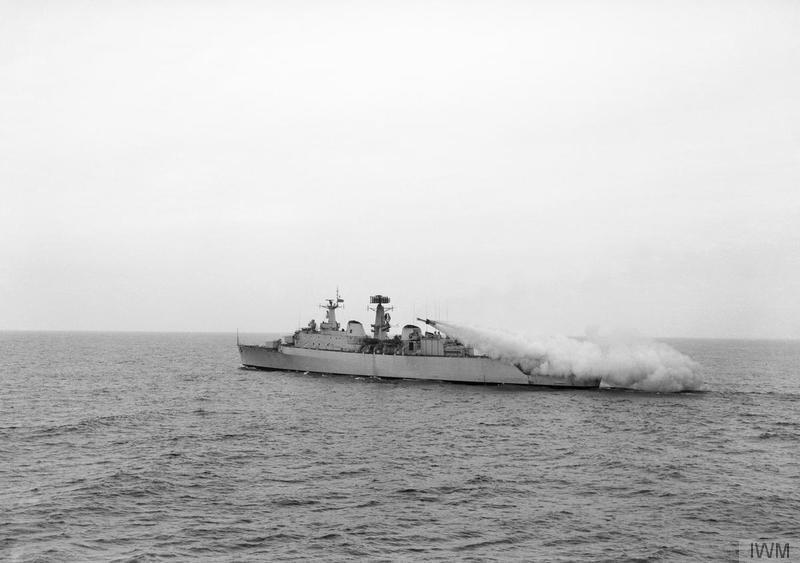
A Seaslug missile roars away from HMS Devonshire's twin launcher for the first time. At this early stage of firing, the boosters can be seen still attached to the weapon, May 1962

In 1962 Devonshire was commissioned and became the first operational Royal Navy ship to fire the Seaslug missile. Following work up, she sailed for the Mediterranean, followed by a return to her home port of Portsmouth. From here she then sailed for Bermuda and the United States. She returned to Portsmouth just before the end of 1962. Captain George Cunningham Leslie OBE, served as Commanding officer from 1965 to 1966.

On 31 August 1966, Devonshire collided with the tanker British Sovereign off the mouth of the River Elbe. No-one was injured on either ship.

Captain Peter Buchanan served as Commanding Officer from 1973 to 1974. Devonshire was involved in patrol duties in the Persian Gulf and the Caribbean Sea, but was not involved in any armed conflict of the United Kingdom. Like the other first batch of County-class ships, Devonshire was fitted with the Seaslug anti aircraft missile defence system. She attended the 1977 Silver Jubilee Fleet Review off Spithead when she was part of the First Flotilla.

== Decommissioning and disposal ==
Devonshire was decommissioned under defence cuts in 1978, though was immediately offered for sale to Egypt, but the sale did not go through. Laid up in Portsmouth harbour for six years, the ship was used as a target, first for testing the new Sea Eagle anti-ship missile, then sunk by HMS Splendid as a target on 17 July 1984 (two days after the Sea Eagle test) in the North Atlantic, whilst testing the Mark 24-Mod-2 Tigerfish torpedo.

== Publications ==
- Colledge, J. J.; Warlow, Ben (2006) [1969]. Ships of the Royal Navy: The Complete Record of All Fighting Ships of the Royal Navy from the 15th Century to the Present (3rd Rev ed.). London: Chatham Publishing. ISBN 978-1-86176-281-8. OCLC 67375475.
- Marriott, Leo, Royal Navy Destroyers since 1945, Ian Allan, ISBN 0-7110-1817-0
- McCart, Neil, 2014. County Class Guided Missile Destroyers, Maritime Books. ISBN 978-1904459637
