= Beachy Head-class repair ship =

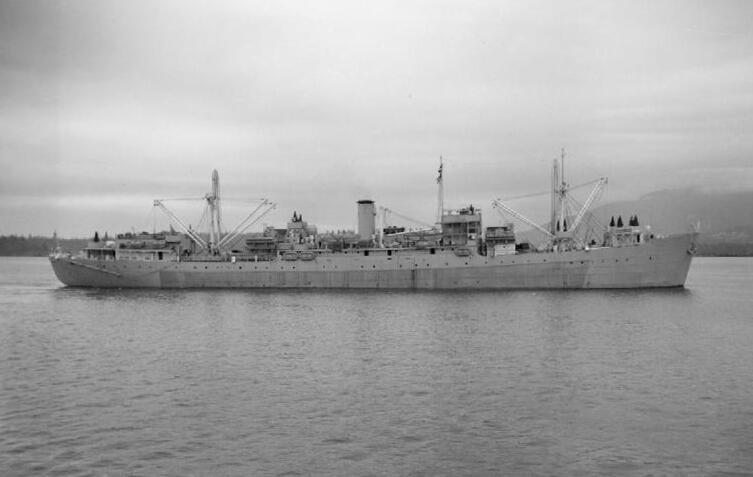
- HMS Flamborough Head underway in coastal waters

Class overview
- Name: Beachy Head class
- Builders: Burrard Dry Dock, Vancouver
- Operators: Royal Navy; Royal Canadian Navy; Royal Netherlands Navy
- Planned: 21
- Completed: 16
- Retired: 16

General characteristics
- Type: Maintenance ship
- Displacement: 8,580 long tons (8,718 t) standard
- Length: 441 ft 6 in (134.6 m) oa; 425 ft 0 in (129.5 m) pp
- Beam: 57 ft (17.4 m)
- Draught: 20 ft (6.1 m)
- Propulsion: Oil-fired triple expansion steam engines, 2 boilers, 1 shaft, 2,500 ihp (1,864 kW)
- Speed: 11 knots (20 km/h; 13 mph)
- Complement: 270
- Armament: 16 × 20 mm Oerlikon cannons

The Beachy Head-class repair ships were a class of 21 depot, maintenance and repair ships constructed for the Royal Navy during the Second World War. All of the ships in the class were constructed in Canada of which only five served in British waters during the war. Based on a modified mercantile design, five of the class were completed as merchant vessels after the war's end. Following the war, the majority were converted for mercantile use, with a further two ships ending up in service with the Royal Canadian Navy and another with the Royal Air Force.

== Design and description ==
Following setbacks in the Pacific theatre of operations which led to the loss of naval bases, the Royal Navy required more depot and repair ships for the fleet to replace shore facilities. As part of the war construction programme, the Royal Navy ordered a series of vessels based on standard mercantile designs and modified them to fit their expected roles. Repair and maintenance vessels were ordered from Canadian shipyards with the escort maintenance ships intended to service smaller types of warships, such as frigates and corvettes. The Beachy Head class, ordered from a series of Canadian shipbuilders, was based on the Fort ship, but of the "Victory" type layout.

The ships of the class had a standard displacement of 8,550 long tons (8,687 t) and 11,270 long tons (11,451 t) fully loaded. They were 441 feet 6 inches (134.6 m) long overall and 425 feet 0 inches (129.5 m) between perpendiculars with a beam of 57 feet (17.4 m) and a draught of 20 feet (6.1 m). The vessels were propelled by one shaft driven by a reciprocating triple expansion steam engine powered by steam from two Foster Wheeler water-tube boilers, creating 2,500 indicated horsepower (1,900 kW). This gave the vessels a maximum speed of 11 knots (20 km/h; 13 mph). Machinery was provided from three manufacturers; General Machinery Corporation of Hamilton, Ohio, Canadian Allis-Chalmers Ltd and Dominion Engineering Works of Montreal, Quebec. The vessels had a complement of 270. During the war, the vessels were armed with sixteen single-mounted 20 mm Oerlikon cannons.

== Ships in class ==
Beachy Head class
Pennant no.	Name	Builder	Launched	Purpose	Fate
F02	Beachy Head	Burrard Dry Dock	27 September 1944	Maintenance and repair ship	HNLMS Vulkaan (1946); HMCS Cape Scott (1954); scrapped Texas 1978
F18	Berry Head	Burrard Dry Dock	21 October 1944	Maintenance and repair ship	
F36	Buchan Ness	West Coast Shipbuilders	10 February 1945	Depot ship	
F49	Cape Wrath	West Coast Shipbuilders	24 August 1945	Maintenance and repair ship	
F19	Dodman Point	Burrard Dry Dock	14 April 1945	Depot ship	
F58	Duncansby Head	Burrard Dry Dock	17 November 1944	Maintenance and repair ship	
F46	Dungeness	West Coast Shipbuilding	15 March 1945	Depot ship	
F29	Fife Ness	Burrard Dry Dock	30 April 1945	Depot ship	
F88	Flamborough Head	Burrard Dry Dock	7 October 1944	Maintenance and repair ship	HMCS Cape Breton (1954); sunk as artificial reef 20 October 2001
F04	Penlee Point	Burrard Dry Dock	29 March 1945	Depot ship	Built as Penlee Point, converted to a missile trials ship HMS Girdle Ness from 1953
F25	Hartland Point	Burrard Dry Dock	4 November 1944	Maintenance and repair ship	
F26	Mull of Galloway (ex-Kinnaird Head)	North Vancouver Shipbuilding	26 October 1944	Maintenance and repair ship	
F86	Mull Of Kintyre	North Vancouver Shipbuilding	5 April 1945	Maintenance and repair ship	
F96	Mull of Oa (ex-Trevose Head)	North Vancouver Shipbuilding	11 August 1945	—N/a	Completed as merchant vessel Turan (1946)
F67	Orford Ness	West Coast Shipbuilders	12 April 1945	—N/a	Completed as merchant vessel Rabaul (1951)
F34	Rame Head	North Vancouver Shipbuilding	22 November 1944	Maintenance and repair ship	Scrapped 2010
F73	Rattray Head	North Vancouver Shipbuilding	8 June 1945	—N/a	Completed as merchant vessel Iran (1951)
F54	Selsey Bill	Burrard Dry Dock	11 July 1945	—N/a	Completed as merchant vessel Waitemata (1946)
F42	Spurn Point	Burrard Dry Dock	8 June 1945	Depot ship	
F84	Tarbat Ness	West Coast Shipbuilders	29 May 1945	—N/a	Completed as merchant vessel Lautoka (1946)

== Service history ==
Of the sixteen vessels that completed before the end of the war, Fife Ness, Girdle Ness, Dodman Point, Dungeness and Spurn Point served in British waters around the United Kingdom. The remaining eleven vessels served either in the East Indies or in the Pacific. Following the war, Beachy Head was loaned to the Royal Netherlands Navy and renamed Vulkaan. The vessel returned to Royal Navy service in 1949 and was then sold to the Royal Canadian Navy and renamed Cape Scott in 1954. Flamborough Head was also sold to the Royal Canadian Navy and renamed Cape Breton in 1954. Fife Ness was transferred to the Royal Air Force and renamed Adastral in 1947.

The stern of Cape Breton was scrapped at the North Vancouver, British Columbia waterfront in 2014 despite protests, the rest of the ship having been sunk as an artificial reef.

== See also ==
- Cape-class maintenance ship
