= HMS Cochrane =

Two ships and a shore establishment of the Royal Navy have borne the name HMS Cochrane, after Admiral Thomas Cochrane, 10th Earl of Dundonald:

- HMS Cochrane (1905) was a Warrior-class armoured cruiser launched in 1905. She was stranded in 1918 and broken up.
- HMS Cochrane (1938) was a depot ship, formerly an armed merchant cruiser, commissioned in 1914 and purchased in 1915 as Ambrose. She was renamed HMS Cochrane in 1938 and was broken up in 1946.
- HMS Cochrane (shore establishment) was the Rosyth naval base commissioned in 1938. It was paid off in 1947 but restored in 1948, taking over from HMS Lochinvar. The base closed in 1962, was recommissioned in 1968 and was finally closed in 1996. The bust of Admiral Cochrane by Scott Sutherland which was commissioned for the base can now be seen in Culross.

A number of satellite establishments also bore the name:

  - HMS Cochrane I was the Rosyth base between 1940 and 1945.
  - HMS Cochrane II was the Rosyth supply and accounting base for tenders between 1940 and 1945.
  - HMS Cochrane II was the naval barracks at Donibristle between 1962 and 1963.
  - HMS Cochrane III was the Primrose Camp training centre and later accommodation establishment between 1942 and 1946.
  - HMS Cochrane V was the ledger for personnel involved in Operation Apostle (the return to Norway) in 1945.
