= HMS Mull Of Kintyre =

Royal Navy support ship

History

United Kingdom
- Name: HMS Mull Of Kintyre (F 86)
- Builder: North Van Ship Repair, North Vancouver
- Laid down: 21 December 1944
- Launched: 5 April 1945
- Commissioned: 2 November 1945
- Decommissioned: December 1969
- Fate: Sold for scrap in 1969

General characteristics
- Class & type: Beachy Head-class
- Type: Heavy repair ship, minesweeper support ship

HMS Mull of Kintyre (F 86) was a Royal Navy Beachy Head-class repair ship in service from 1945 to 1969. Launched by Canadian shipyard North Vancouver Ship Repair in April 1945, the ship began service in the Royal Navy as an armament maintenance ship, a role which made use of its large storage capacity and workshop facilities. In 1955, Mull of Kintyre was refitted as a repair and accommodation ship; in late 1961 it was converted again to a minesweeper maintenance ship and transferred to serve in Singapore. In this station, the ship served as a base for the Inshore Flotilla and as accommodation for headquarters staff and extra sailors, while also supporting the flotilla's minesweepers and other small ships. In December 1969, the ship was sold to Hong Kong Shipbreakers to be broken up for scrap and was subsequently towed to Manila.
