= Seaslug (missile) =

British surface-to-air missile

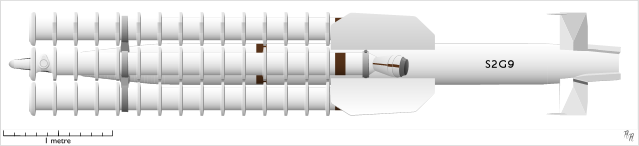
- Seaslug Mk. II missile
- Type: Surface-to-air missile
- Place of origin: UK

Service history
- In service: 1961–1991
- Used by: UK (Royal Navy), Chile
- Wars: Falklands War, Cold War

Production history
- Designed: Mark 1: 1961; Mark 2: 1965
- Manufacturer: Armstrong Whitworth
- Variants: Mark 1, Mark 2

Specifications
- Mass: Mk.1: 2,080 kg Mk.2: 2,384 kg
- Length: Mk.1: 6.0 m Mk.2: 6.1 m
- Diameter: Mk.1: 0.42 m Mk.2: 0.41 m
- Wingspan: 1.44 m
- Warhead: Mk.1: 200 lb (91 kg) blast Mk.2: continuous-rod warhead
- Detonation mechanism: Mk.1: radio proximity & impact Mk.2: infrared proximity
- Engine: 4 solid-fuel jettisoned boosters; Solid-fuel sustainer
- Operational range: Mk.1: 30,000 yards (27,000 m); Mk.2: 35,000 yards (32,000 m)
- Flight ceiling: Mk.1: 55,000 feet (17,000 m); Mk.2: 65,000 feet (20,000 m)
- Maximum speed: Mk.1: 685 mph (1,102 km/h); Mk.2: 1,370 mph (2,200 km/h)
- Guidance system: Beam riding
- Steering system: Control surface
- Launch platform: Ship

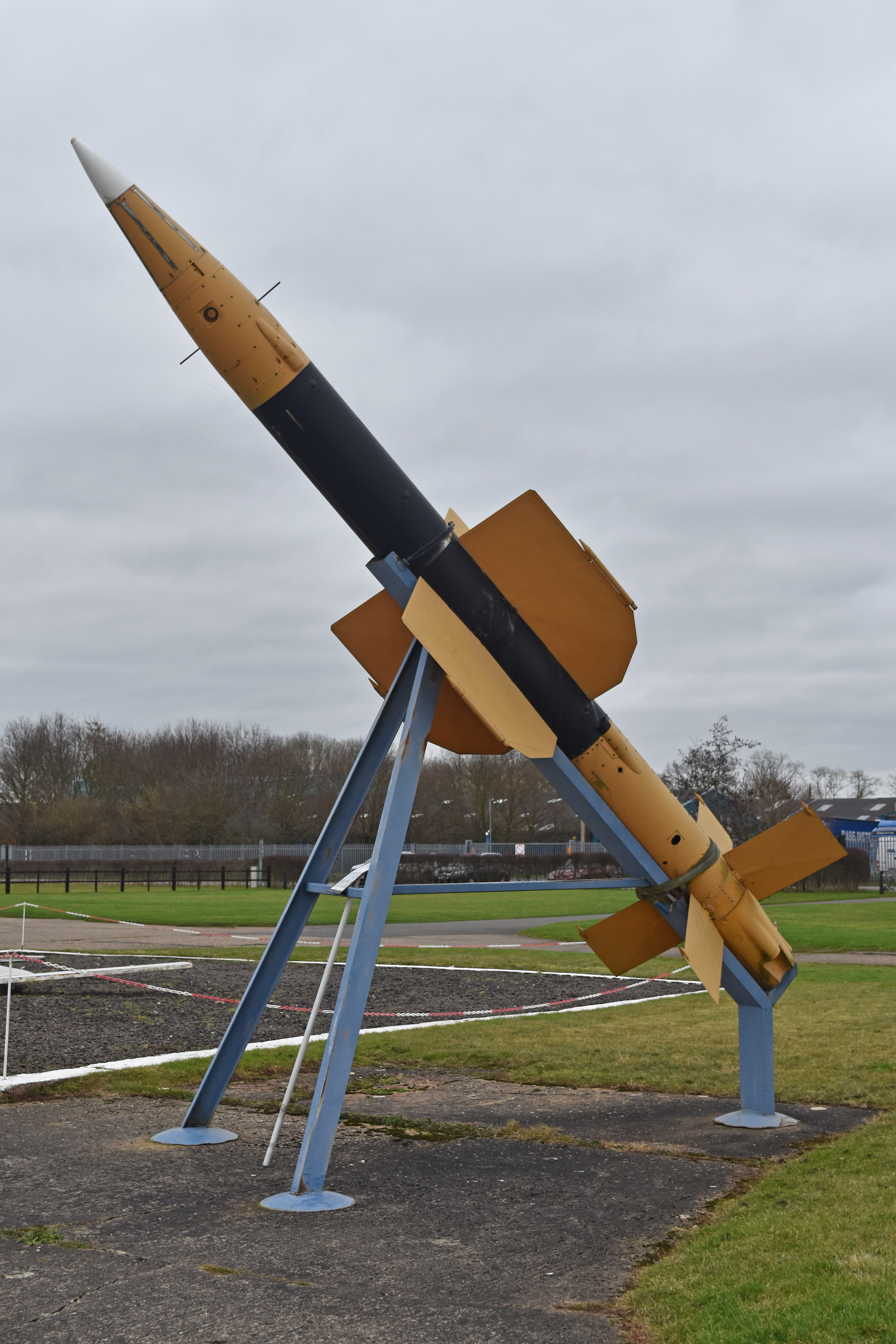
Seaslug on display at Wickenby Aerodrome, Lincolnshire, UK. The small antennas near the nose indicate this is fitted with a telemetry pod in place of the warhead section.

Seaslug was a first-generation surface-to-air missile developed by Armstrong Whitworth (later part of the Hawker Siddeley group) for use by the Royal Navy. Its origins date back to the 1944 LOPGAP project. The missile entered operational service in 1961 and remained in use until the early 1980s, including during the 1982 Falklands War.

Designed to engage high-altitude targets such as reconnaissance aircraft or bombers before they could launch stand-off weapons, Seaslug was fitted only to the eight County-class destroyers, which were purpose-built around the system. The missile was fired in combat at an airborne target on a single occasion, by HMS Antrim during the Falklands War, but failed to hit its target, although it was later used against surface targets.

Seaslug's medium-range role was initially intended to be replaced by the long-range Blue Envoy missile. However, Blue Envoy was cancelled in favour of a new medium-range system, Sea Dart. Sea Dart entered service in 1973 aboard the Type 82 destroyer HMS Bristol (D23) and gradually replaced Seaslug as the County-class destroyers were withdrawn from service during the 1980s.

== Development ==
=== Initial concept ===
In 1943, the German Luftwaffe began the use of anti-shipping missiles and guided bombs in the Mediterranean Sea during Allied operations against Italy. These weapons were released outside of anti-aircraft gun range, which meant that naval operations lacking complete air superiority would be open to attack with no effective response from the ships. A solution for long-range anti-aircraft was required. On 16 March 1944 the first meeting of the "Guided Anti-Aircraft Projectile Committee", was held.

The Admiralty Signals Establishment (ASE), in charge of the Navy's radar development, was working on new radars featuring radar lock-on that allowed them to accurately track aircraft at long range. This was part of the LRS.1 fire-control system that allowed large dual-purpose guns to attack bombers at long range. A contemporary British Army project at Cossors, Brakemine, was working on a system to allow a missile to keep itself centred within a radar beam, a concept known today as beam riding. The Navy decided to combine the two concepts, using the LRS.1's Type 901 radar with a new missile that differed from Brakemine primarily in requiring longer range and being more robust for shipborne use.

=== LOPGAP anti-aircraft weapon ===
In December 1944, GAP put out a Naval Staff Target for a new anti-aircraft weapon, capable of attacking targets at altitudes up to 50,000 ft (15,000 m) and speeds of up to 700 mph (1,100 km/h). This project was briefly known as LOPGAP, short for "Liquid Oxygen and Petrol Guided Anti-aircraft Projectile", but soon moved from petrol to methanol which made the "LOP" inaccurate.

The Fairey Aviation Company at this time was working on a missile project for the Ministry of Supply, Stooge. Stooge was more like an armed drone aircraft than a missile. It was flown to a location in front of the target and then cruised toward it until its warhead was triggered by the operator. It was designed primarily to defeat kamikaze attacks at short range. Its low speed and manual guidance meant it was not useful for interceptions outside the immediate area of the ship, and thus did not meet the need for a longer-ranged missile capable of dealing with stand-off weapons.

Accordingly, Fairey was ordered to stop work on Stooge in favour of LOPGAP. (Note: Existing Stooge airframes continued to be test-fired for a time.) Development was slowed by the Air Ministry who were opposed to the project as it might take resources away from jet fighter production (Note: For unclear reasons, considering the Air Ministry was also working on several missile designs of their own.) and a lack of urgency on the part of both the Admiralty and Ministry of Supply.

A March 1945 report called for the first test launches of LOPGAP from converted QF 3.7-inch air-aircraft gun mounts within two months. The same mounts had also been used, with different modifications, for Stooge and Brakemine. They predicted the final system would be about 19 ft (5.8 m) long and a twin-launcher would take up about the same room as a twin 5.25-inch gun turret. An April Staff Target called for the system to be able to engage an aircraft flying at 500 mph (800 km/h) at altitudes up to 40,000 ft (12,000 m) with a maximum weight of 500 lb (230 kg).

=== Missile projects moved to the Royal Aircraft Establishment ===
In 1945 a new Guided Projectiles Establishment was set up under the Controller of Supplies (Air) and in 1946 development of all ongoing missile projects moved to the Royal Aircraft Establishment's (RAE) new Controlled Weapons Department, soon to become the Guided Weapons Department. They began considering the beam riding concept in partnership with the Telecommunications Research Establishment (TRE), the deliberately oddly-named department of the Air Ministry responsible for radar development. Over the next year, first Brakemine and then Stooge were moved to the RAE.

In a January 1947 Navy review, the program was given the name Seaslug. This called for a significantly larger weapon than initially envisioned, capable of single-stage vertical launch, a warhead (and guidance) of 200 lb (91 kg) and an all-up weight of 1,800 lb (820 kg). Development continued as before but was significantly hampered by the post-war exodus of engineering talent. Shortly after the new definition was produced, this project also moved to the RAE. Efforts by the Navy to change the name from Seaslug to the more ominous-sounding "Triumph" failed.

Development slowed, and in July 1947 the Admiralty approached Henry Tizard to argue for a more "virile leadership" of the program. Tizard called a meeting of the Defence Research Policy Committee (DRPC) and started a process of pushing through four key missile programs that were intended to enter service in 1957, Seaslug, a longer ranged Army/Air Force surface-to-air missile known as Red Heathen, the Blue Boar television guided glide bomb, and the Red Hawk air-to-air missile.

In March 1948 a new report from the DRPC noted there was not enough manpower for all four projects, and put Seaslug at the bottom of the priority list, claiming air attack would be less likely than submarine in the event of war. They suggested the much longer ranged Red Heathen was more important in the short term. The Admiralty was of another opinion on the matter and argued against the change in priority.

The Navy found an unlikely ally in the Army, who were concerned that Red Heathen was too difficult to move to in a single step and suggested that Seaslug might be the basis for a more immediate medium-range weapon that could be used both on land and sea. The DPRC also began to have concerns about accurately guiding Red Heathen at its desired 100,000 yd (91 km) maximum range. In September 1948 they agreed to develop Seaslug "as a matter of insurance", before further upgrading it in 1949 to "top priority". As a result of these changes, the program was seen as having two stages, Stage 1 would deliver missiles in the mid-1950s with roughly 20 miles (32 km) range with capability mostly against subsonic targets, and a Stage 2 of the early 1960s would have a greatly extended range on the order of 150 miles (240 km) and able to attack supersonic aircraft.

=== Experimental systems ===
Two test systems emerged from this centralization. The CTV.1 was a small unpowered Brakemine-like system devoted to the development of the guidance systems, launched using three RP-3 rocket motors and controlled through the coast phase. A series of CTV designs followed, providing ever-increasing amounts of telemetry for the guidance and control systems work. GAP became a purely research-oriented system, RTV.1 (rocket test vehicle), as opposed to a prototype missile design, and was used primarily as a platform for testing the rocket motors. The GAP/RTV.1 efforts would be directed at the Stage 1 design, which would essentially be the Seaslug requirement.

The relatively small CTV could safely be launched at the Larkhill Range, part of the Royal School of Artillery. It was equipped with a parachute that allowed it to be recovered. This was not possible for the much longer-ranged RTV, which was fired from RAF Aberporth out over Cardigan Bay in Wales. The desire to reclaim the RTVs as well led to the opening of a parallel launch facility at the RAAF Woomera Range Complex and a program that led development of supersonic parachutes.

As RTV.1 testing continued, the decision was made to build a larger version, RTV.2, which would be more typical of a production missile. During early testing, the design was further modified and renamed GPV, for General Purpose Test Vehicle. Several liquid rocket motors were tested as part of this program. Early tests demonstrated shifts in the center of gravity that required active damping, which in turn led to the lengthening of the overall fuselage to become the "long round". This version used forward-mounted boosters, which were mounted so their exhaust was just in front of the mid-mounted wings.

=== Project 502 ===
As experimental work progressed, the Ministry of Supply began forming an industry team to build production systems. In 1949 this gave rise to the 'Project 502' group from industry, with Armstrong Whitworth Aircraft and Sperry in March and GEC in September.

The 29 July 1949 update of the Staff Target called for a maximum range of 30,000 yd (27 km) and a minimum of 5,000 yd (4.6 km). Maximum altitude should be 55,000 ft, but 45,000 would be considered acceptable. A further update pushed the range to 30,000–60,000 yd (27–55 km) against a 600 kn (1,100 km/h), later 650 kn (1,200 km/h), target. It was assumed the targets would "jink" at 1G, so the missile needed to maneuver at 4G at sea level and 2.5G at 40,000 ft. Additional requirements were the ability to switch between targets in 6 seconds.

The designers ultimately selected a maximum range of 30,000 yards, which included 6,000 yd (5.5 km) of coasting after motor burn-out. This was about 50% better than the contemporary US Terrier design. Hit probability was estimated to be 40% at maximum range, (Note: RN and RAF standards of the era counted "hits" under the NATO ADM 1/28039 standard "K15", meaning the target would be destroyed within 15 seconds of a hit. In contrast, US standards of the era listed any damage to the target as a hit. For this reason, UK missile "hit" probabilities are generally much lower than US in spite of actually being significantly more deadly.) so salvos of three missiles would be fired at once, demanding a three-place launcher. This was later reduced back to a twin-launcher when it was realized accessing the missile in the middle launcher would make maintenance difficult.

=== Changing requirements ===
When the deployment of the Seaslug was first being considered, three classes of custom missile-firing ships were considered. The Task Force Ship would be capable of 30 kn (56 km/h) and would tasked with fleet air defence, the Ocean Convoy Escort was a 17 kn (31 km/h) vessel that would provide direct cover over seagoing convoys, while the 12 kn (22 km/h) Coastal Convoy Escort would do the same for ships travelling closer to shore. At that time it was believed that aircraft carriers would be able to provide adequate cover over convoys or fleets in the ocean, so attention turned to the Coastal Convoy Escort. Beginning in May 1953 a Beachy Head-class repair ship, HMS Girdle Ness, was converted into a prototype escort ship to test this fitting.

For this role, maximum storage density was essential, so the initial design featured a single booster rocket mounted at the missile’s base. This resulted in a very long missile that caused handling issues on small ships. Like most contemporary designs, the single inline booster was eventually replaced by four smaller boosters wrapped around the fuselage, reducing the overall length to about 20 ft (6.1 m). These boosters were positioned within the diameter defined by the missile’s wings, so they did not increase its storage diameter. However, if one booster failed to fire, the thrust would become significantly off-axis. This problem was later mitigated by moving the boosters forward, placing their exhaust near the missile’s centre of gravity, which allowed the small control surfaces to maintain effectiveness despite asymmetric thrust. By comparison, the American Terrier missile was shorter at 13 ft 6 in (4.11 m), but employed an additional tandem booster, bringing its total length to 28 ft 6 in (8.69 m).

In 1954, during another review of the Navy's future operations, consideration turned from a "hot war" against the Soviets to a series of "warm wars" in the third world. Among other changes brought about by this review, including the cancellation of a future all-gun cruiser class and ending further conversion of WWII-era destroyers to Type 15 frigates, the new environment meant that air cover by carriers could not be guaranteed, and the need for air defence for task-force sized groups became the primary concern. A cut to carrier construction, capping the fleet at four, released funds for missile ship construction. In October 1954, a new design emerged that demanded the speed to keep up with a fleet in combat, have guns limited to self-defence, and carrying a single twin-missile launcher.

The designs were continually modified in order to find a suitable arrangement. They started as early as 1953 with a mid-sized cruiser of 15,000 long tons (15,000 t) carrying 60 to 90 missiles and a crew of 900. Admiral Ralph Edwards pointed out it would be more useful to have a larger number of small ships with 10 to 20 missiles than one larger one, but attempts to design such a ship resulted in one with room for the weapons but not the crew needed to operate them. In May 1955 a wide variety of plans for designs between the two extremes were compared, ranging from 9,850 tons down to 4,550. After continual comparison and revision, these plans finally gelled around what became the County-class destroyer.

=== Test firings ===
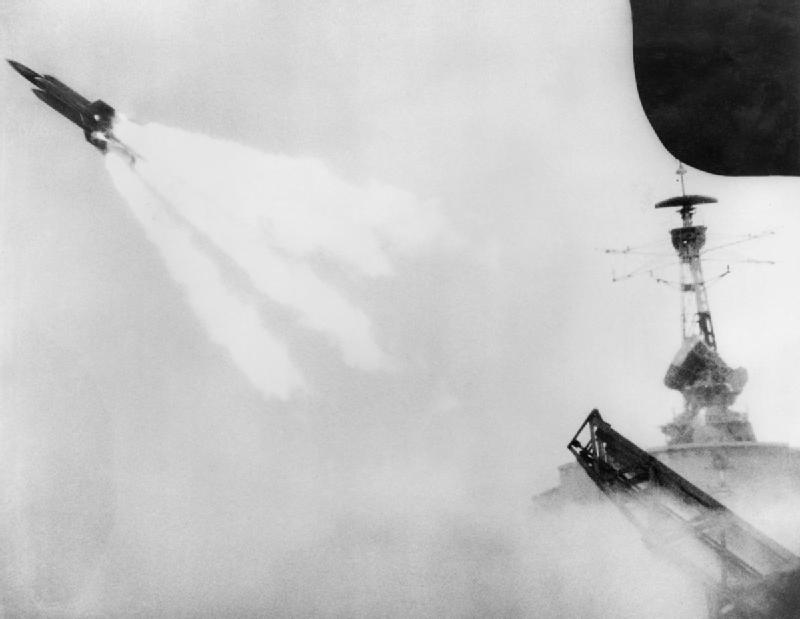
The firing of the first Seaslug test missile from HMS Girdle Ness (A387). This version is based on the RAE's early GPV, and retains the rear-mounted boosters before they moved forward on the "long round".

Test firings of the GAP-based examples, now known as Rocket Test Vehicle 1, or RTV.1, demonstrated beam riding in October 1956. The Navy had set a date of 1957 for a broad modernization of the fleet, so they desired Seaslug to be cleared for service in 1956. To this end, they accepted the use of liquid fuels in spite of the Navy's concerns with these fuels on ships. However, by 1956 a new solid fuel rocket had been developed at the Summerfield Research Station which provided the desired range.

Continual tests took place over the next four years using both the Clausen Rolling Platform at RAE Aberporth and the Girdle Ness. A final series of tests at sea, which culminated in sixteen successful firings, finally cleared the missile for service in 1961. After more than 250 launches, the Seaslug Mark 1, also known as Guided Weapon System 1, or GWS.1, finally entered service in 1962 on County-class, each fitted with a single twin missile launcher and a complete weapon system with one fire control set and 30 missiles. The Seaslug-armed cruisers were cancelled in 1957.

Seaslug needed height, range and bearing information for targets. By 1955 the Royal Navy considered using the Type 984 radar on Seaslug-armed cruisers and destroyers to provide this. During development, the projected weight of the radar doubled, to the point where it could still potentially be mounted on cruisers, but was rejected for destroyers because it would have meant sacrificing their 4.5 in gun armament. The gun armament was regarded as essential for the navy's wider role outside the hot war mission. The solution adopted with the first batch of the County-class destroyers was to network them with ships carrying Type 984. The destroyers were given a reduced version of the Comprehensive Display System (CDS), which was fed by a CDS-link receiver called DPD (Digital Picture Transmission or Translation).

The final set for the County ships, actually more a cruiser type than a destroyer, was quite complex: a Type 965 radar for early warning (P-band, 450 kW peak power, range over 175 km), in the County Batch 2 the double antenna AKE-2 had two different frequency settings; a Type 992Q target indicator radar (3 GHz, 1.75 MW peak power, 90 km range); a Type 278 height finding set (80–90 km); a Type 901 missile guidance radar (X band, 70 km range), that in the Sea Slug Mk 2 had a continuous wave signal (but it was still a beam riding designation radar); a Type 904 fire control radar (used in the MRS-3 system, X-band, 50 kW, 35 km range) for surface targeting.

== Description ==
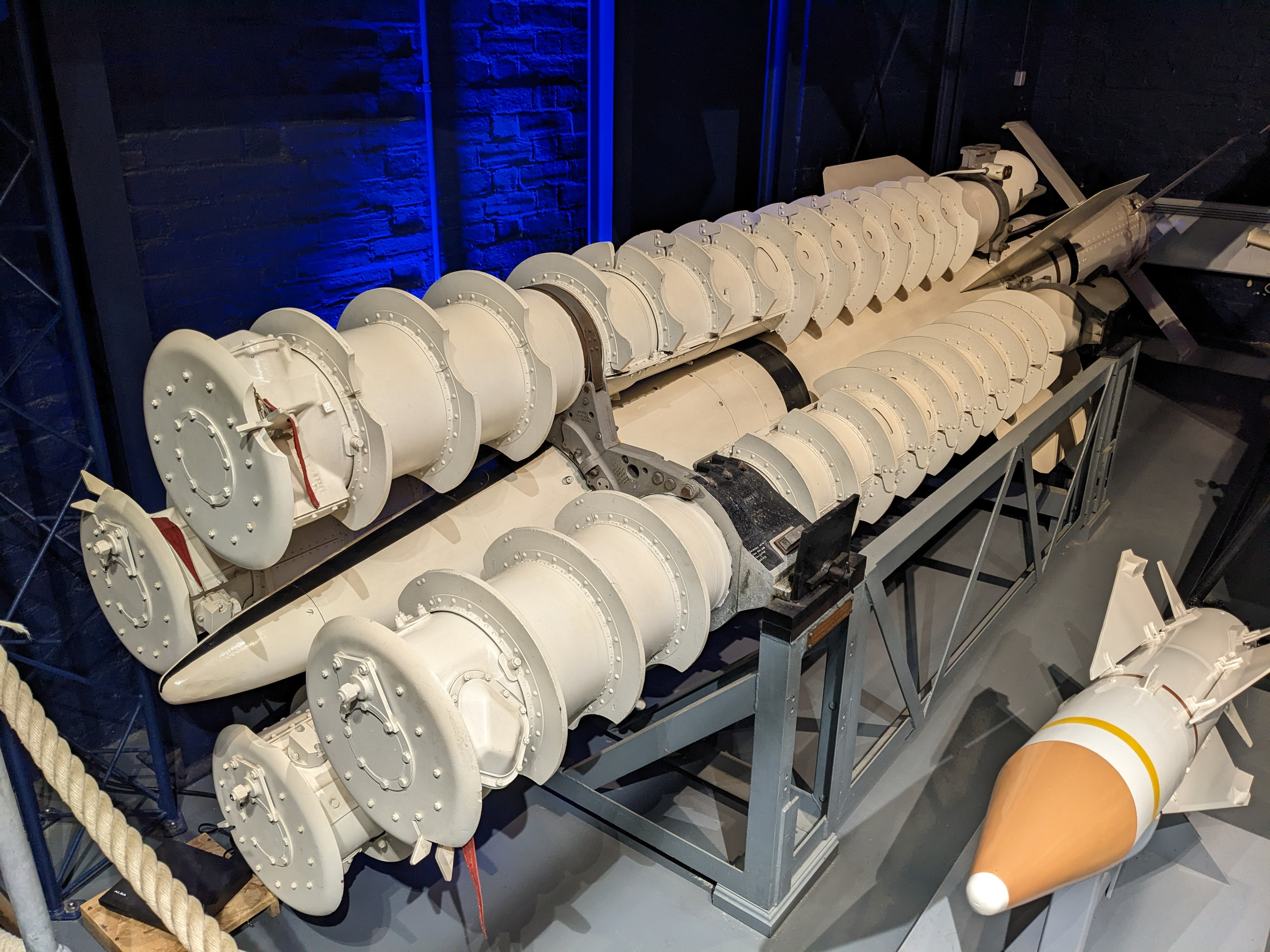
Seaslug Mark 2 on display at Explosion Museum of Naval Firepower, showing the prominent booster motors. To the right is a Sea Wolf.

The missile had four wrap-around booster motors that separated after launch. After separation, the main motor ignited to power the missile to the target. The booster motors were positioned at the side of the missile, but this unusual arrangement with the motor nozzles both angled outwards at 22.5° and 22.5° to the left, the missile entered a gentle roll at launch, evening out differences in the thrusts of the boosters. This meant that large stabilising fins as used on contemporary missiles in service with the Royal Air Force (Bloodhound) and the British Army (Thunderbird) were not required. Once the boosters were jettisoned the control surfaces became active.

Guidance was by radar beam-riding, the beam to be provided by Type 901 fire-control radar. There were four flight modes:

- LOSBR (Line Of Sight, Beam Riding), in which the missile flew up a beam that tracked the target
- CASWTD (Constant Angle of Sight With Terminal Dive), with the missile climbing at a low angle and then diving onto a low-altitude target at 45°, used against low flying targets at over 12,000 yards away
- MICAWBER (Missile In Constant Altitude While BEam Riding), used against low level target approaching at 500–800 feet, it allows switching from CASWTD to LOSBR when the target is closing at the ship
- Up and over: the standard surface attack mode, using the Type 901 radar slaved to the Type 903 in bearing; the missile is fired at high elevation and then depressed in order to strike the vessel with a steep dive, without arming the fuse.

Electrical power when the missile was in flight was provided by a flux switching alternator with a six tooth rotor. "The 1.5 kVA Seaslug generator ran at 24,000 rev/min with a frequency of 2,400 Hz."

== Service performance ==
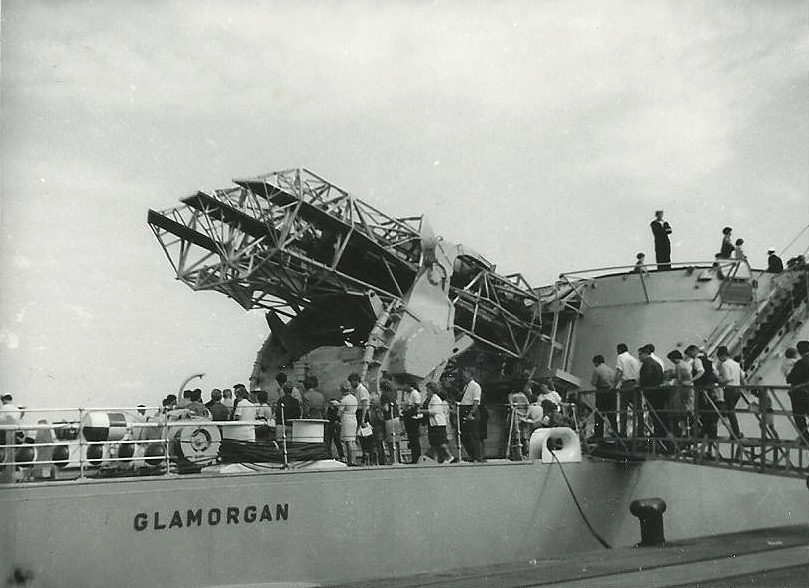
The Seaslug launcher mounted on the quarterdeck of HMS Glamorgan, circa 1972

Seaslug was considered a high-performance weapon in the 1960s, with a single-shot kill probability claimed as high as 92 percent. Other estimates are lower: 75 percent for the Mk 1 and 65 percent for the Mk 2. The first four ships of the County-class destroyers (Batch 1) operated the Seaslug Mk 1, while the final four (Batch 2) were fitted with the Action Data Automation Weapons System (ADAWS) command and control system, which enabled them to carry the more capable Mk 2 version. A proposal to refit the Batch 1 ships with ADAWS was dropped in 1968.

The final firing of the Seaslug Mk 1 occurred in December 1981, by HMS London, the last Batch 1 destroyer in operational service. HMS Fife was later converted into a training ship, with her Seaslug systems removed to create space for classrooms. The conversion was completed in June 1986. Fife and the remaining GWS2 ships were sold to Chile between 1982 and 1987. The British government initially proposed upgrading the ships with Sea Dart missile systems, but the Chileans declined, and the ships were transferred with Seaslug still fitted. In Chilean service, the launchers were later removed and replaced by an extended flight deck.

During the Falklands War, Seaslug Mk 2 missiles were deployed aboard HMS Antrim and HMS Glamorgan. Only one was launched against an aircraft, by Antrim, without success. On 21 May 1982, in Falkland Sound, Antrim, which had previously been struck by an unexploded 1,000 lb bomb that passed through the Seaslug magazine, fired a single missile (some sources state two) at one of a second wave of attacking IAI Dagger fighters. The aircraft were flying too low to be acquired by the missile’s radar, so the launch was unguided. It was intended to deter the pilot and remove the exposed missile from the launcher, as it posed a fire hazard.

The first combat use in a surface-to-surface role occurred on 26 May, when Glamorgan fired a Seaslug Mk 2 at the radar site near Port Stanley Airport, claiming the destruction of a radar installation and several helicopters. Glamorgan conducted further bombardments using Seaslug missiles against the runway on 28 and 30 May. A total of six Seaslug Mk 2 missiles were launched during the campaign: four operational firings and two jettisoned for safety after Glamorgan was struck by a land-launched Exocet missile on 12 June. Also during 1982, the Mk 2 variant was used as a target drone in Sea Dart missile trials, although reliability issues affected both systems.

Ship	Date	Target	Result
Antrim	21 May 1982	Argentine IAI Dagger	One unguided missile fired at a low-flying aircraft no hit.
Glamorgan	26 May 1982	Port Stanley radar site	One missile fired. No confirmed results.
Glamorgan	28 May 1982	Port Stanley runway	One missile fired at runway to scatter debris. No confirmed results.
Glamorgan	30 May 1982	Port Stanley runway	One missile fired to hinder runway use. Effectiveness unconfirmed.
Glamorgan	12 June 1982	Jettisoned (post-Exocet hit)	Two missiles jettisoned for safety. No engagement.

== Variants ==
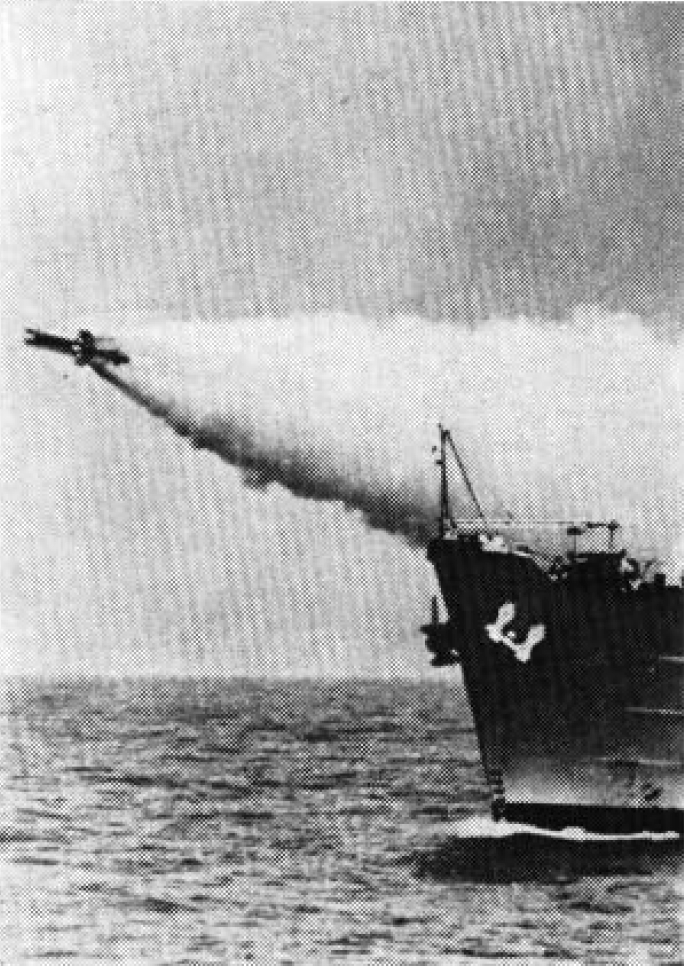
HMS Girdle Ness (A387) test launches a production model Seaslug circa 1961. The forward mounted boosters are prominent.

There were two main variants of the Seaslug:

=== Mark 1 (GWS.1) ===
The Seaslug Mark 1 was powered by the solid-fuel Foxhound (390 kg fuel) sustainer motor (Note: There is a common error about a liquid-fuel sustainer on this model.) and Gosling (145 kg) booster motors. It had a radio proximity fuze and 200 lb (91 kg) blast warhead.

The Mark 1 was a beam rider missile, meaning the target had to be continually illuminated by the directing radar, so the system was limited to engaging only the number of targets that there were radars to track and lock on.

- Attack Velocity: 685 mph (1,102 km/h)
- Range: 30,000 yards (27,000 m)
- Ceiling: 55,000 feet (17,000 m)

=== Mark 2 (GWS.2) ===
The Seaslug Mark 2 was based on the aborted Blue Slug programme to develop an anti-ship missile using the Seaslug missile and guidance system. The project was cancelled in favour of the "Green Cheese" missile, a tactical nuclear anti-ship weapon, but other project developments were incorporated into what became the Mark 2. It had improved low altitude performance and a limited anti-ship capability and entered service in 1971. The Mark 2 utilized an improved beam-riding guidance system. and solid-state electronics. It was powered by the Deerhound sustainer motor, with Retriever boosters. Control was by a modified Type 901M radar and it had an improved infra-red proximity fuze and a continuous-rod warhead with a smaller, 56 lb (25 kg), explosive charge (RDX-TNT) and an unfold diameter of about 70 feet (10 mm steel rods were used)

- Attack velocity: 1,370 mph (2,200 km/h)
- Range: 35,000 yd (32 km)
- Ceiling: 65,000 ft (20,000 m)

The capabilities of the new Sea Slug Mk 2, an almost 2.5 ton missile, were much improved compared to the previous Mk 1. The boosters gave a total of about 60 tons-force, with 186 kg (410 lb) fuel for each one (145 kg in the Mk 1), accelerating it to over Mach 2. When they separated because the extreme drag made by the rings all around the missile, the solid fuel sustainer Deerhound started to burn its 440 kg (970 lb) of propellant (390 kg for the Mk 1) and gave about 1,820 kg/s (241,000 lb/min) for 38 seconds. The slender missile remained at over Mach 2-2.5 until the flameout. The missile was made fully controllable about ten seconds after firing, followed by a radio-beacon while it was centered in the radar beam; and armed the infra-red proximity fuze at about 1 km (1,100 yd) from the target, if 'hot', while if 'cold' the missile was detonated by command sent from the ship.

The range could be even more than 35,000 yards, especially at high altitude, with head-on supersonic targets. One of the longest shots recorded was made by HMS Antrim against a target over 58,000 yd (33 mi; 53 km) away, with an impact at 34.500 with about 46 seconds flight time. The missile was capable of reaching potentially even higher altitude and longer range than nominally attested: even after the engine flameout (over 40 seconds after launch), it retained very high speeds and one of them even surpassed 85,000 ft (26,000 m) before self-destructing, about one minute after the firing.

For both Mark 1 and Mark 2 Sea Slug there were drill rounds (painted blue) for the purpose of training and display rounds (painted red) which could be loaded onto the launcher for port visits and public relations.

=== Nuclear variant (not built) ===
In addition, a nuclear-armed variant was planned using a low-yield fission warhead code-named Winkle. Winkle was never built as it was quickly supplanted by Pixie, a very small unboosted warhead with an all-plutonium fissile core tested at Maralinga, which was, in turn, replaced by Gwen — a British version of the US W54 Gnat unboosted warhead of approximate yield 0.5–2 kiloton of TNT-equivalent. The final warhead choice was Tony - a UK version of the W44 Tsetse boosted warhead, but all nuclear options for Seaslug were subsequently abandoned, and no nuclear-armed variant of Seaslug was ever deployed.

== Operators ==
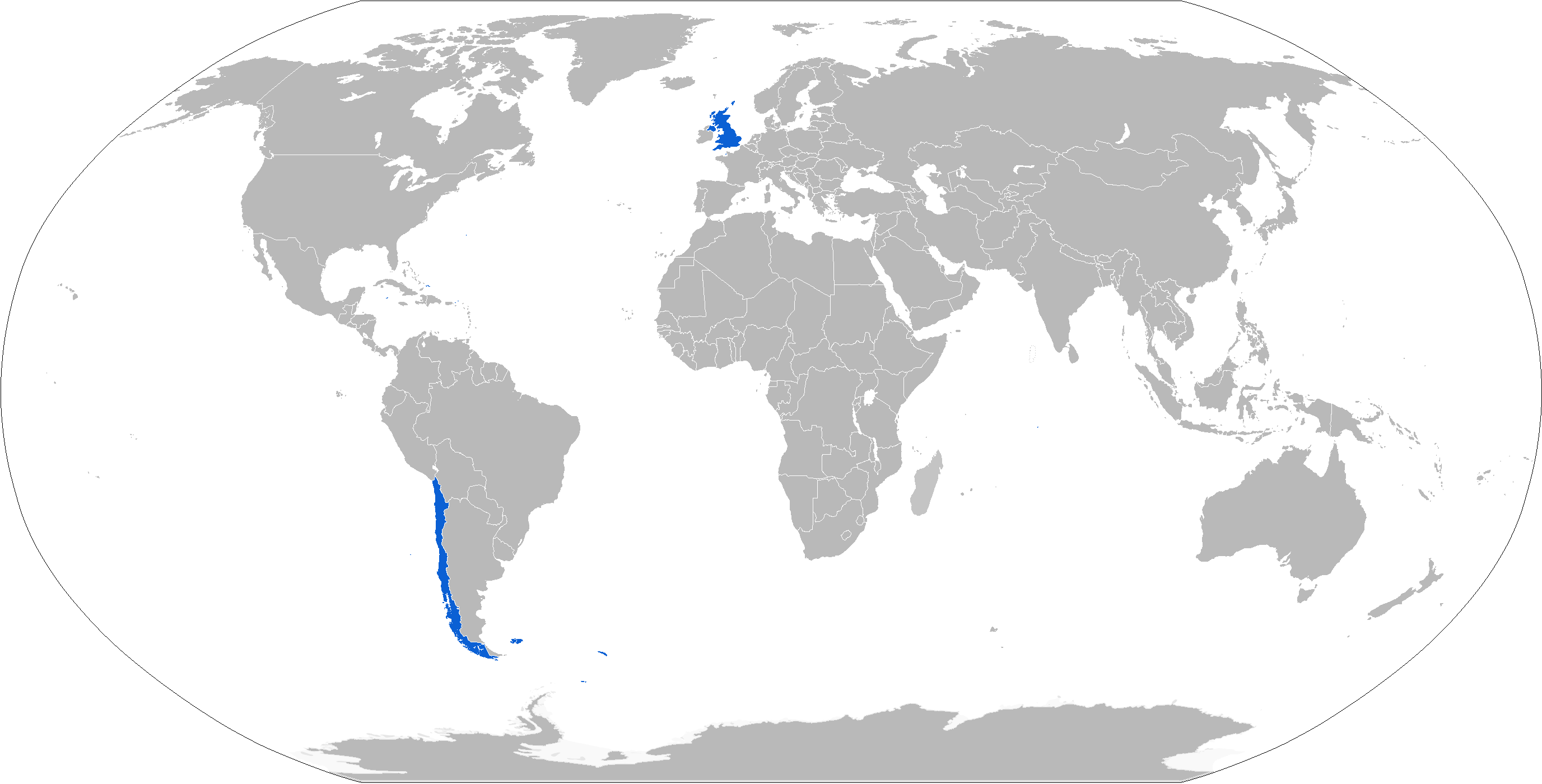
Map with Seaslug operators in blue

=== Royal Navy ===
The County-class destroyers were specifically built to carry Seaslug and its associated control equipment. The magazine was positioned amidships and missiles were assembled in a central gallery forward of the magazine before being passed to the launcher on the quarterdeck. The handling arrangements were designed with a nuclear-war environment in mind and were therefore entirely under cover.

=== Chilean Navy ===
Some of the County-class destroyers were sold to Chile for the Chilean Navy. The system was decommissioned after the rebuild of the four ships purchased by Chile in the early 1990s.

=== Former operators ===
- Chile: Chilean Navy
- United Kingdom: Royal Navy

== Bibliography ==
- Naval Armament, Doug Richardson, Jane's Publishing, 1981, ISBN 0-531-03738-X
