= Type 901 radar =

The Royal Navy's Type 901 X-band radar was used as the beam-riding command guidance system for the Seaslug missile system, which was the first such system used by the Royal Navy. Designed by the Admiralty Surface Radar Establishment at Portsdown, the project was passed to Marconi Systems for manufacture.

== Background ==
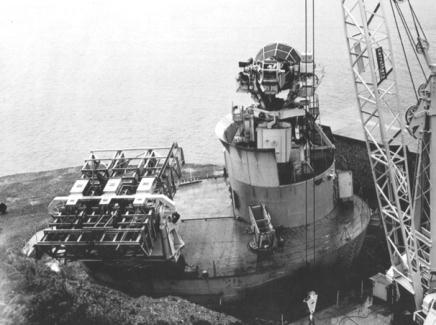
Testing on the Clausen Rolling Platform at Aberporth: triple missile launcher to the left, Type 901 radar on the right

The Type 901 radar was initially intended as the tracking system for the Long Range System 1 (LRS1) anti-aircraft system. LRS1 was a complete fire control system including the 901, plotting systems and ballistic computers that were intended to allow existing dual-purpose high-angle guns to perform effective anti-aircraft fire at much longer ranges than was possible during WWII. As the LOPGAP programme began to focus on the Seaslug design, the 901 was re-purposed to provide aiming guidance for the missile. The anti-aircraft requirement was dropped in 1949, along with the LRS1 concept, and development continued for Seaslug.

== Details ==
The single unit produced three co-axial beams; a high powered (600 kW) target tracking beam, a lower powered (50 kW) guidance beam for the missile, and a wider gathering beam.

Originally the antennas were mounted in front of two parabolic reflectors, one with a relatively wide beam for the gathering radar, and another with a narrower pattern for tracking. These were mounted on a modified wartime pom-pom mounting. Eventually, this was replaced by a design with the tracking and guidance beams being focused through a large dielectric lens instead of a reflector, and a much smaller parabolic reflector for the gathering beam placed on the right-hand side of the lens.

The Type 901 radar's tracking antenna could be set to one of 8 frequency bands within the range 9.1 GHz to 9.8 GHz, the guidance and gathering antennae shared a separate frequency, around 0.1 GHz lower

Target acquisition was manual, with one crewman searching in elevation and azimuth, and on finding the target a second crewman found the range; at this stage the system was locked onto the target and would continue to track it. This process took 20 – 30 seconds

The target-tracking and guidance beams produced were incredibly fine, being measured at 0.8° wide at 6 dB down, this enabled the tracking radar to discriminate between targets as close as 20 minutes of arc or a range separation of 75 yards. Once properly gathered the missile typically remained within 35 feet of the centre of the beam for the duration of the engagement.

The achieved power "was no mean feat, but undoubtedly the greatest advance made in this radar was the ultimate achievement of a tracking accuracy giving an rms aiming error of only 20 arc-seconds -the equivalent of 2·5 yards at a range of 25,000 yards (12·5 miles). And this from a 4-axis-stabilised aerial with transmitter and receiver weighing some 12 tons in a ship that rolls, pitches and heaves."

There were 3 flight modes:

- Line Of Sight, Beam Riding (LOSBR ), in which the missile flew up a beam that tracked the target
- Constant Angle of Sight With Terminal Dive (CASWTD ), with the missile climbing at a low angle and then diving onto a low-altitude target
- Missile In Constant Altitude While Beam Riding (MICAWBER), similar to CASWTD, but with a terminal low-level glide phase so that the Mark 2 variant could be used against ships. This mode suffered from problems associated with the surface of the water reflecting the guidance beam.

== Type 901(M) ==
The upgraded radar associated with the Seaslug Mk2 system featured a Constant Wave (CW) tracking radar, and the discrimination was improved to 18 minutes of arc. It also featured a number of automatic scanning patterns for target acquisition
