= Rostamabad =

Rostamabad (Persian: رستم اباد) may refer to the following places in Iran:

== Ardabil Province ==
- Rostamabad, Ardabil, a village in Kowsar County

== Chaharmahal and Bakhtiari Province ==
- Rostamabad, Chaharmahal and Bakhtiari, a village in Ardal County

== Fars Province ==
- Rostamabad, Fars, a village in Kazerun County

== Gilan Province ==
- Rostamabad, Gilan, a city in Gilan Province, Iran
- Rostamabad-e Jonubi Rural District
- Rostamabad-e Shomali Rural District

== Hamadan Province ==
- Rostamabad, Hamadan, a village in Asadabad County

== Hormozgan Province ==
- Rostamabad-e Dehvast, a village in Bashagard County
- Rostamabad, Parsian, a village in Parsian County
- Rostamabad, Rudan, a village in Rudan County

== Kerman Province ==
- Narmashir, formerly, Rostamabad, a city in Kerman Province, Iran
- Rostamabad-e Chah Degan, a village in Fahraj County
- Rostamabad, Qaleh Ganj, a village in Qaleh Ganj County
- Rostamabad, Rigan, a village in Rigan County
- Rostamabad, Rudbar-e Jonubi, a village in Rudbar-e Jonubi County

== Kermanshah Province ==
- Rostamabad-e Bozorg, a village in Kangavar County
- Rostamabad-e Kuchak, a village in Kangavar County
- Rostamabad-e Rika, a village in Kermanshah County

== Khuzestan Province ==
- Rostamabad, Andika, a village in Andika County
- Rostamabad, Ramhormoz, a village in Ramhormoz County

== Lorestan Province ==
- Rostamabad, Lorestan, a village in Lorestan Province, Iran
- Rostamabad Jamshidi, a village in Lorestan Province, Iran

== North Khorasan Province ==
- Rostamabad, North Khorasan, a village in North Khorasan Province, Iran

== Qazvin Province ==
- Rostamabad, Qazvin, a village in Qazvin Province, Iran

== Razavi Khorasan Province ==
- Rostamabad, Nishapur, a village in Nishapur County

== Semnan Province ==
- Rostamabad, Semnan, a village in Aradan County

== Sistan and Baluchestan Province ==
- Rostamabad, Nukabad, a village in Khash County

== Tehran Province ==
- Rostamabad, Damavand, a village in Damavand County
- Rostamabad, Varamin, a village in Varamin County
