= Rostami (place) =

Some of the lands dominated by the ancient Persian dynasties yet carry Rostami (or Rostam) name as proclaimed the influencers of that region, village or district in the past however such regional influencers totally lost their authority after the fall of the Qajars and post World War modernization.

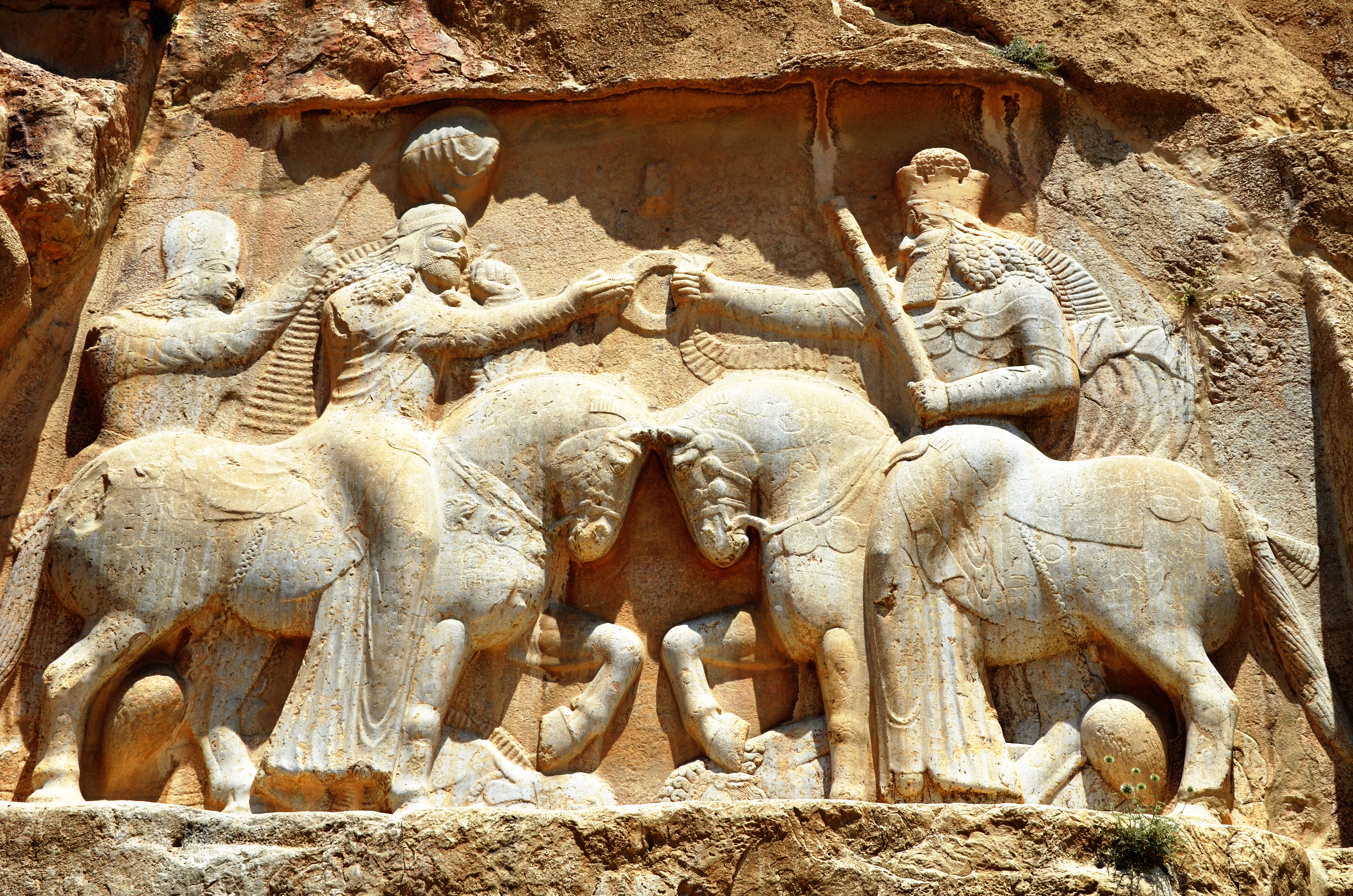
Rostam Inscription

== The list of places ==
- Rostami, Bushehr, in Bushehr Province
- Rostami, Bu ol Kheyr, in Bushehr Province
- Rostami, Delvar, in Bushehr Province
- Rostami, in Hormozgan Provinece
- Rostami, in Chaharmahal and Bakhtiari Province
- Naqsh-e Rustam, in Fars Province
- Chah-e Rostami, in Khorasan Province
- Rostamabad, in Gilan Province
- Rostamabad, in Kermanshah Province
- Rostamabad, in Kerman Province
- Rostamabad, in Ardabil Province
- Rostamabad, in Tehran Province
- Rostam, Sistan and Baluchestan
- Rostam County, in Fars Province

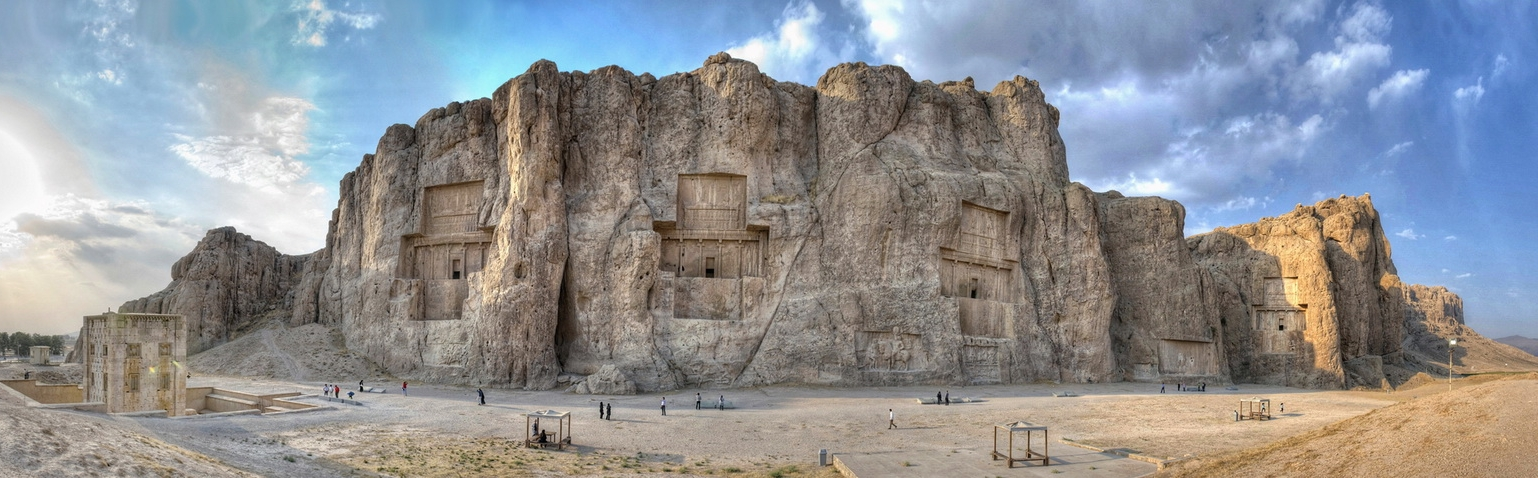
Naghshe Rostam 1200 BC

== See also ==
- Rostami (disambiguation)
- Rostam (disambiguation)
- Rostamabad (disambiguation)
- Baba Rostam (disambiguation)
- Rostam Kandi (disambiguation)
