= Rustem =

Rustem is a masculine name.

== Given name ==
- Rustem Adagamov (born 1961), Russian blogger
- Rustem Akhmetzyanov (born 1978), Russian footballer
- Rustem Bulatov (1974-2008), Russian footballer
- Rustem Hayroudinoff, Russian concert pianist
- Rustem Kanipov (born 1982), Russian footballer
- Rustem Mukhametshin (born 1984), Russian footballer
- Rustam Temirgaliev (born 1976), Russian and Ukrainian politician of Volga Tatar descent
- Rustem Umerov (born 1982), Ukrainian Minister of Defense 2023–2025
- Rustem Vambery (1872-1948), Hungarian politician

== Surname ==
- Jan Rustem (1762–1835), Lithuanian painter

== See also ==
- Rüstem, the Turkish form of the name
- Rostam (name)
