= Rustom =

Rustom may refer to:

- Rostam, hero of the Persian epic Shahnameh
- Rustom (2003 film), a Bangladeshi film by Badiul Alam Khokon, starring Manna and Moushumi
- Rustom (film) (2016), an Indian biographical film by Tinu Suresh Desai, starring Akshay Kumar and Ileana D'Cruz
  - Rustom Pavri, fictional Indian Navy officer in the film played by Kumar, based on Kawas Manekshaw Nanavati
- Rustom (1982 film), a 1982 Indian Hindi-language film, starring Tanuja, Dara Singh and Rajendra Kumar
- DRDO Rustom, an unmanned combat air vehicle
  - Rustom Damania, professor at the Indian Institute of Science and Technology, namesake of the UAV
- Elie Rustom (born 1987), Lebanese basketball player
- Emile Rustom, Lebanese football manager
- Paul Rustom (born 1983), Lebanese footballer
- Rustom Bharucha, Indian academic
- Rustom Jal Vakil (born 1911), Indian cardiologist
- Rustom Khurshedji Karanjia (1912 –2008), Indian journalist and editor
- Rustom Khushro Shapur Ghandhi (1924–2014), vice admiral in the Indian Navy
- Rustomji Bomanji Billimoria, Indian physician and social worker
- Rustomji Jamshedji, Indian cricketer
- Rustomjee Naserwanjee Khory (1839–1904), Indian physician and writer
- Hilla Rustomji Faridoonji (1872–1956), Indian educationist and political activist
- Rustom Pavri, fictional doctor played by Kurush Deboo in the Indian film Munna Bhai M.B.B.S. (2003)
- Parsee Rustomji (1861–1924), Indian-South African businessman, philanthropist and activist

== See also ==
- Rustum (disambiguation)
- Rostam (disambiguation)
- Rostam and Sohrab, a tale from the Persian epic Shahnameh, about the hero Rostam and his son Sohrab
  - Rustom O Sohrab, an Urdu-language play by Indian writer Agha Hashar Kashmiri
  - Rustam Sohrab, a 1963 Indian film by Vishram Bedekar
- Rustom-E-Baghdad, a 1963 Indian drama film directed by B.J. Patel
- Rustam-e-Hind (lit. 'Champion of India'), wrestling title in India
- Rustom-E-Hind, a 1965 Indian Hindi-language film by Kedar Kapur
