= Rostam (name) =

Rostam / Rustam / Rostom
- Gender: Male

Origin
- Origin: Persian

Other names
- Variant forms: Rustem, Rüstem

Rostam or Rustam or Rostom (Persian: رستم) is a name referring to the Persian mythical hero Rostam who was immortalized by the poet Ferdowsi in the Shahnameh (Book of Kings). It has been commonly used as a male Persian given name, and may refer to the following people:

== Given name ==
- Rostam Farrokhzād (died 636), An ancient Persian nobleman and army chief
- Rostom Sharvashidze, ruler of the Principality of Abkhazia
- Rustam Asildarov (born 1981), leader of the Islamic State of Iraq and the Levant – Caucasus Province
- Rostam Aziz (born 1960), Tanzanian politician and businessman
- Rostom Bagdasarian (1919–1972), American artist and record producer
- Rostam Bastuni (1923–1994), first Israeli-Arab politician
- Rostam Batmanglij (born 1983), American music producer and multi-instrumentalist
- Rustam Akhmedov (1943–2025), Uzbek military officer
- Rustam Effendi (1903–1979), Indonesian writer and member of the House of Representatives of the Netherlands
- Rustam Emomali (born 1987), Tajik official, son of Emomali Rahmon
- Rostam Ghasemi (1964-2022), Iranian military officer and politician
- Rostam Gorgani, Persian physician who lived in India
- Rustam Ibragimbekov (1939–2022), Azeri screenwriter and film director
- Rostom of Imereti (1561–1605), Georgian king
- Rostom of Kartli (1565–1658), Iranian–Georgian king and military commander
- Prince Rostom of Kartli (died 1722), Iranian–Georgian prince and military commander
- Rustam Kasimdzhanov (born 1979), Uzbek chess master
- Rostom, nom de guerre of Stepan Zorian (1867–1919), Armenian revolutionary
- Rustam Khan Khoyski (1888–1948), Azerbaijani statesman
- Rustam Khudzhamov (born 1982), Ukrainian footballer
- Rustam Khudiyev (born 1985), Kazakh swimmer
- Rostom Madatyan (1782–1829), Armenian-Russian general
- Rustam Minnikhanov (born 1957), Russian politician, current President of Tatarstan
- Rostam Mirlashari (born 1960), Iranian musician
- Rustam Mirza (1381–1424/25), a grandson of Timur
- Rustam Mirza Safavi (1565–1642), Safavid prince
- Rustam Rahimov (born 1979), German-Tajik boxer
- Roustam Raza (1780–1845), famous bodyguard of Napoleon Bonaparte
- Rostam Khan (sepahsalar under Safi) (1588–1643), Iranian-Georgian military commander and official
- Rostam Khan (sepahsalar under Suleiman I), Iranian-Georgian military commander and official
- Rostam K. Saeed (born 1964), Kurdish mathematician and professor from Iraq
- Rustam Saidov (born 1978), Uzbek boxer
- Rustam Sharipov (born 1971), Ukrainian gymnast
- Rustam Sutan Palindih (1898–1971), Indonesian film director and writer
- Roustam Tariko (born 1962), Russian entrepreneur
- Rustam Temirgaliev (born 1976), Crimean politician
- Röstäm Yaxin (1921–1993), Russian composer and pianist
- Rustam (Haqqani network), Afghan alleged Taliban militant
- Rustam Shah Mohmand (1942-2024), Pakistani political scientist and served as ambassador to Afghanistan
- Rustam Ali Faraizi (born 1952), Bangladeshi politician
- Rustam Ali Mollah (1920–2023), Bangladeshi politician and freedom fighter
- Muhammad Rustam Ali (born 1960), Bangladeshi chemist and academic
- Rustam Azimov (born 1958), Uzbek politician

== See also ==
- Rüstem, Turkish form of the name
- Rustem, Another spelling
- Rostami, Disambiguation page
- DRDO Rustom
