= Rustemi =

Rustemi is a given name and surname. Notable people with the name include:

- Arlind Rustemi (born 1986), Albanian footballer
- Avni Rustemi (1895–1924), Albanian patriot, militant, teacher, activist and member of the Albanian parliament, known for assassinating Essad Pasha Toptani
- Rustemi Kreshnik (born 1984), Albanian-Belgian kickboxer

== See also ==
- Carabus rustemi, a species of black coloured ground beetle in the Carabinae subfamily that is endemic to Kazakhstan
- Rostami (surname)
