= HAL TAPAS BH-201 =

Indian unmanned aerial vehicle

DRDO TAPAS BH-201
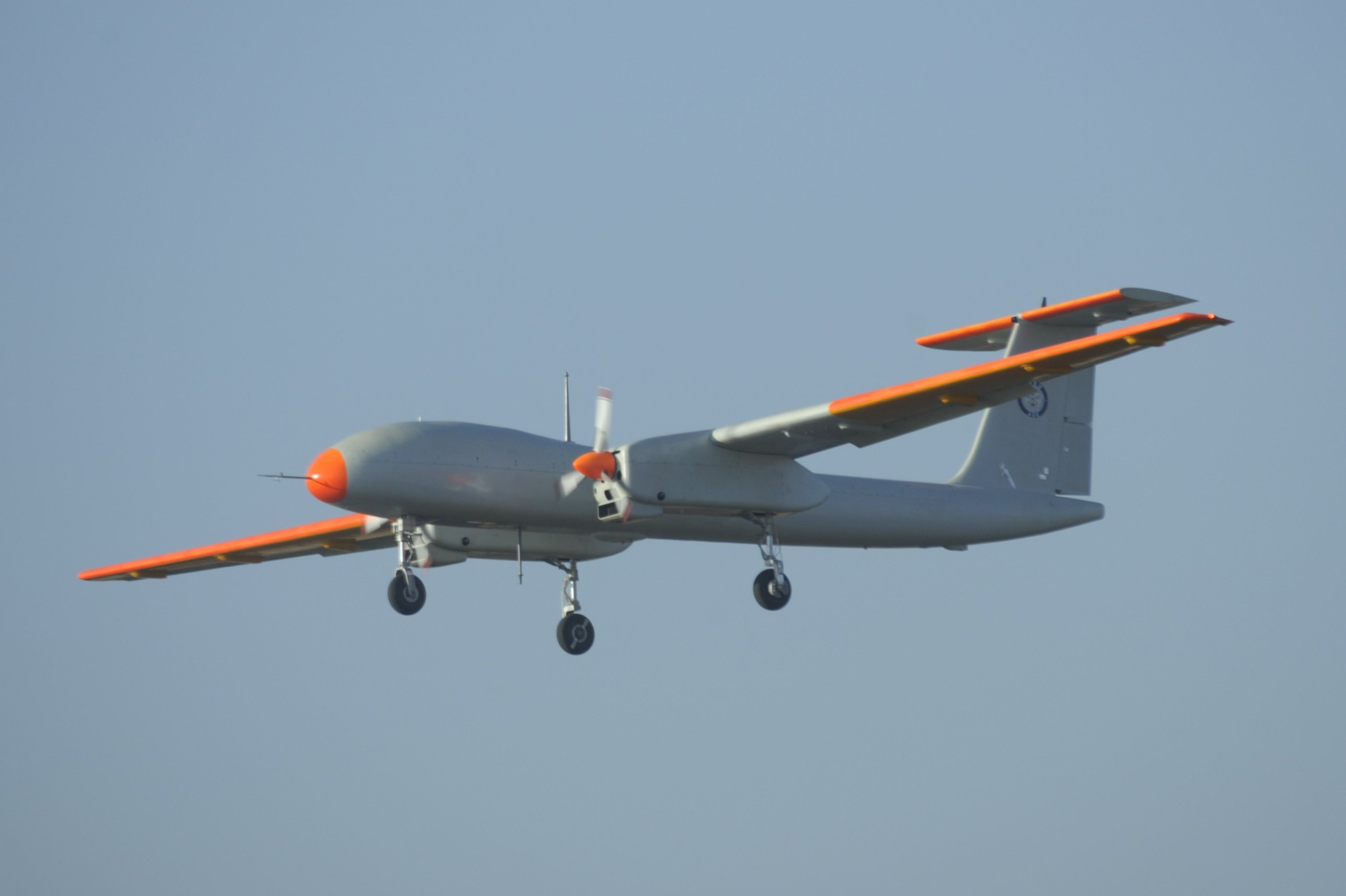
- TAPAS-BH-201 in flight

General information
- Type: Unmanned aerial vehicle
- National origin: India
- Manufacturer: Bharat Electronics; Hindustan Aeronautics Limited
- Designer: Aeronautical Development Establishment
- Status: User trials
- Primary user: Indian Armed Forces
- Number built: 4 (Prototypes)

History
- First flight: 15 November 2016
- Developed from: DRDO Rustom-H

The Tactical Airborne Platform for Aerial Surveillance Beyond Horizon-201 or TAPAS BH-201(lit. 'Heat') (formerly referred to as Rustom-II until 2016) is a medium-altitude long-endurance (MALE) unmanned aerial vehicle (UAV) being developed in India by Aeronautical Development Establishment (ADE) on the lines of General Atomics MQ-1 Predator.

The UAV is a further development of twin-engine Rustom-H, which was a part of Rustom technology demonstrator programme of DRDO.

The first flight of the UAV took place in November 2016. On 14 January 2024, a government source disclosed that TAPAS-BH-201 had been officially closed as a mission mode project due to its inability to achieve the Joint Services Qualitative Requirements (JSQRs) for altitude and endurance. ADE will keep developing the UAV, enhancing its designs and boosting its power to better meet the demands of the armed forces, especially on endurance and altitude.

== Design ==
In October 2010, a senior DRDO official had stated that the General Atomics MQ-1 Predator is an obvious template for the Rustom program. DRDO had then built a credible unmanned flying platform. According to various statements, "The way the Americans converted a robust surveillance drone into a combat drone is something we are confident we can replicate for the Rustom-H. It will have a great deal of mission flexibility".

In February 2012, ADE Director P S Krishnan stated that designing of Rustom-II has been completed, purchase orders have been placed and we are on schedule to fly for the first time in February 2014. In contrast to Rustom-I, the next generation version is equipped with enhanced aerodynamic configuration, digital flight control, navigation system, communication intelligence, medium and long-range electro-optic payloads and synthetic aperture radar that will enable it to see through the clouds. Rustom-2 is capable of carrying different combinations of payloads depending on the mission objectives including electronic intelligence systems and situational awareness systems. It has a satellite communication link to relay situation in the battle theatre on real time basis.

The project started at the cost of ₹1,540.74 crore (equivalent to ₹32 billion or US$330 million in 2023) but later revised to ₹1,786 crore (equivalent to ₹19 billion or US$200 million in 2023) as of 2022.

== Development ==
In September 2013, the Rustom-II began full power taxi trials at the Kolar airfield near Bengaluru. It would carry out intelligence, surveillance and reconnaissance (ISR) roles for the Indian Armed Forces. Once inducted, this indigenous medium altitude long endurance (MALE) multirole drone is likely to be an asset for Indian armed forces for its surveillance capability as well as for its use as an unmanned combat aerial vehicle.

TAPAS-BH-201 had a successful maiden flight on 16 November 2016 at Challakere, 200 km away from Bengaluru in the district of Chitradurga in south Indian state of Karnataka. It was tested for take off, landing and other parameters. Ten pilotless UAV's would be produced per year. Nine prototypes more advanced than the initial one would follow for testing prior to the beginning of certification process. Initially DRDO Chief S. Christopher denied arming Rustom-II. There was news of Rustom-II using power plant of Austro Engine but no confirmation from DRDO side considering a Chinese company Wanfeng Auto Holding Group acquired it through Diamond Aircraft Industries in 2016.

Although it was reported that from prototype AF-5, ADE replaced 125 hp Rotax 914 with 180 hp engine from Austro. ADE was also planning to use 200 hp power plant from Lycoming Engines to improve power-to-weight ratio. In the meantime, Vehicle Research and Development Establishment (VRDE) and Tech Mahindra started working on an Indian engine for Rustom-II.

During the test phase, five additional prototypes were manufactured close to production variant powered by twin NPO-Saturn 36MT turboprop engines rated 74.57 kW (100 hp). ADE is also trying to decrease weight of Rustom-II by 260 kg. The platform is now being developed as a long endurance surveillance platform capable of deploying precision weapons. With an overall length of 9.5 m and a wingspan of more than 20.6 m, the UCAV needs a runway to takeoff and land unlike traditional UAVs. Initially 1,800 kg was planned but the prototypes are weighing 2,200 kg. Rustom-II has a cruising speed of 135 kn carrying 350 kg of payload.

The drone can loiter autonomously at high altitudes performing real-time, high-resolution intelligence, surveillance and reconnaissance (ISR) with its SAR and EO sensors. When a target is identified, it will either illuminate the target with a laser designator for other strike aircraft, or descend to lower altitude and attack the target with its own air-to-surface missiles.

Combat Vehicles Research and Development Establishment (CVRDE) successfully conducted low speed and high speed taxi trial of Tricycle Nose Wheel Type Retractable Landing Gear System for Rustom-2 at Chitradurga on 2 August 2018. Rustom-2 prototype AF-6 crashed on 17 September 2019 due to link loss with the ground station that activated 'return home mode' but rough turbulence beyond the capacity of control law made the platform unstable. This problem was later rectified in prototype AF-6A with upgraded features like a solid state relay-based low weight power distribution unit, an Indian inertial navigation system and lithium-ion batteries with satellite communication (SATCOM) link.

DRDO flight tested the Rustom-2 and achieved eight hours of flying at an altitude of 16,000 ft at Chitradurga, Karnataka in October 2020. The prototype expected to achieve an altitude of 26,000 ft and endurance of 18 hours by the end of 2020. Till now Rustom-2 completed 77 developmental test flights.

On 13 November 2021, Rustom-2 demonstrated autonomous take-off and landing capability using GPS-aided GEO augmented navigation (GAGAN). It has T-shaped tail assembly and shoulder-mounted wings to improve perceptibility of payloads. The platform uses Tricycle Nose Wheel Type Retractable Landing Gear System which is designed for high touchdown speeds and sink velocity during landing. On 16 December 2021, TAPAS-BH-201 successfully crossed 25,000 ft and 10 hours endurance milestone. In March 2022, TAPAS-BH-201 successfully demonstrated 28,000 ft and 18 hours of endurance. The Indian Armed Forces are impressed by the advance ground control and image exploitation system of Rustom-2.

In May 2022, TAPAS-BH-201 system was expected to be handed over to Hindustan Aeronautics Limited (HAL) and Bharat Electronics Limited (BEL) for limited production.

The drone was tested at Aero India 2023 during public demonstrations.

On 16 June 2023, DRDO and Indian Navy team successfully demonstrated transferring of command & control capabilities of TAPAS UAV from a distant ground station to onboard INS Subhadra, 148 km from Karwar naval base. The UAV was flying around an altitude of 20,000 ft. One Ground Control station and two Ship Data Terminal were installed in INS Subhadra for controlling the UAV.

On 27 June 2023, DRDO demonstrated 200th flight of Tapas to the tri-services team for the first time at ATR Chitradurga. Tapas was now ready for user evaluation trials.

=== Manufacturing ===
As per chairman and managing director of HAL, R Madhavan, six air-frames will be made in 2022 for user evaluation trials in which platform must reach 30,000 ft with an endurance greater than 16 hours. By 2023, DRDO would complete all development work related to Rustom-2 and HAL would start mass production after the completion of user trials. ADE will train HAL technicians for the integration of first two units and later monitor the production process for quality control.

The final product will have combat range of 250 km. A total of 76 TAPAS drones was expected to be inducted initially into the armed forces in which 60 is for Army, 12 for Air Force and 4 for Navy.

== Mission Mode Project status ==
The Tapas project by DRDO had an August 2016 target, however due to a number of concerns, including the UAV's increased "all-up weight" of 2,850 kg, an imported engine, and payload problems, the original date was missed and the project's final cost was revised to ₹1,786 crore. Additionally, Tapas did not meet the Joint Services Qualitative Requirements (JSQRs) of the Indian Armed Forces regarding its operational endurance and the height at which it should operate. While DRDO was able to accomplish flying endurance at 28,000 feet for almost 18 hours, their goal was to reach a flight height of up to 30,000 feet and sustain it for at least 24 hours.

The Tapas programme was demoted from Mission Mode Project status, a move that sparked controversy. Some claimed that the move was made to undermine the indigenous effort, driven by special interests, following the delivery of the Drishti-10 Starliner, which was made by local commercial vendor Adani Defence and Aerospace in partnership with Elbit Systems.

ADE will continue to develop the UAV after its removal from mission mode project status. It received a boost when the Indian Navy expressed its interest in using TAPAS-BH-201 from the Andaman and Nicobar Islands for observation and aerial reconnaissance missions. In one of the trials, Indian Navy operated the drone over Arabian Sea after taking flight from Chitradurga Aeronautical Test Range (CATR). Due to the requirement of shorter runway, small airfields in the island territories can be used to station TAPAS-BH-201.

Now that the platform needs to be certified in order to be used, DRDO has been ordered to "freeze the configuration" because it is believed that work on a platform cannot go on forever without a deadline. The developers have contacted the Centre for Military Airworthiness and Certification (CEMILAC). For certification, four fundamental parameters—aerodynamics, controllers, propulsion, and structural—will be put to the test. TAPAS-BH-201 will only be accepted by the Indian Navy once the drone has been certified as airworthy. Two Tapas drones from the DRDO inventory will probably be sent to the Indian Navy for testing and performance evaluation.

India Today stated on 14 February 2023, that the Indian Air Force has formally shown interest in exploring the capabilities of TAPAS-BH-201 to the DRDO.

== Operators ==
=== Planned Operators ===
- India: Indian Air Force (6 units)
- India: Indian Navy (4 units)

=== Potential Operators ===
- Armenia: In July 2022, Armenia had expressed interest to acquire the TAPAS-BH-201.

=== Formerly Planned Operators ===
- India: Indian Army had plans to purchase 60 drones.

== Specifications ==
Data from Defstrat.com, stargazer2006.online.fr and Times of India.com

General characteristics

- Capacity: 350 kg (772 lb) payload
- Length: 9.5 m (31 ft 2 in)
- Wingspan: 20.6 m (67 ft 7 in)
- Empty weight: 1,800 kg (3,968 lb)
- Powerplant: 2 × NPO-Saturn 36T engines wing-mounted turboprop, 74.57 kW (100.00 hp) each (Prototype)
- Powerplant: 2 × VRDE indigenous , 160 kW (220 hp) each (Production)
- Propellers: 3-bladed constant-speed propeller

Performance

- Maximum speed: 224 km/h (139 mph, 121 kn)
- Ferry range: 1,000 km (620 mi, 540 nmi)
- Endurance: 18 hours
- Service ceiling: 9,800 m (32,000 ft)

== See also ==
- Unmanned Air Vehicle

Aircraft of comparable role, configuration, and era

- DRDO Rustom
- MQ-1 Predator
- IAI Heron
- Drishti-10

Related lists

- List of unmanned aerial vehicles
