= Rostam Kandi =

Rostam Kandi (Persian: رستم كندي) may refer to:

- Rostam Kandi, East Azerbaijan
- Rostam Kandi, Kurdistan
