= Baba Rostam =

Baba Rostam (Persian: بابارستم) may refer to:

- Baba Rostam, Hamadan
- Baba Rostam, Kermanshah
- Baba Rostam, Kurdistan
