= Rostami (surname) =

Rostami or Rustami or Rostamian (from Persian: رستمي) is a family name that refers to the ancient Persian hero called Rostam. The ancient monuments of Naqsh-e Rustam and The Book of Kings (Shahnameh) describe Rostam The Invincible. Both Rostam (as a first name) and Rostami (as a family name) are popular in many regions of the Middle East and can also be found in Asia. A related name is Rustemi.

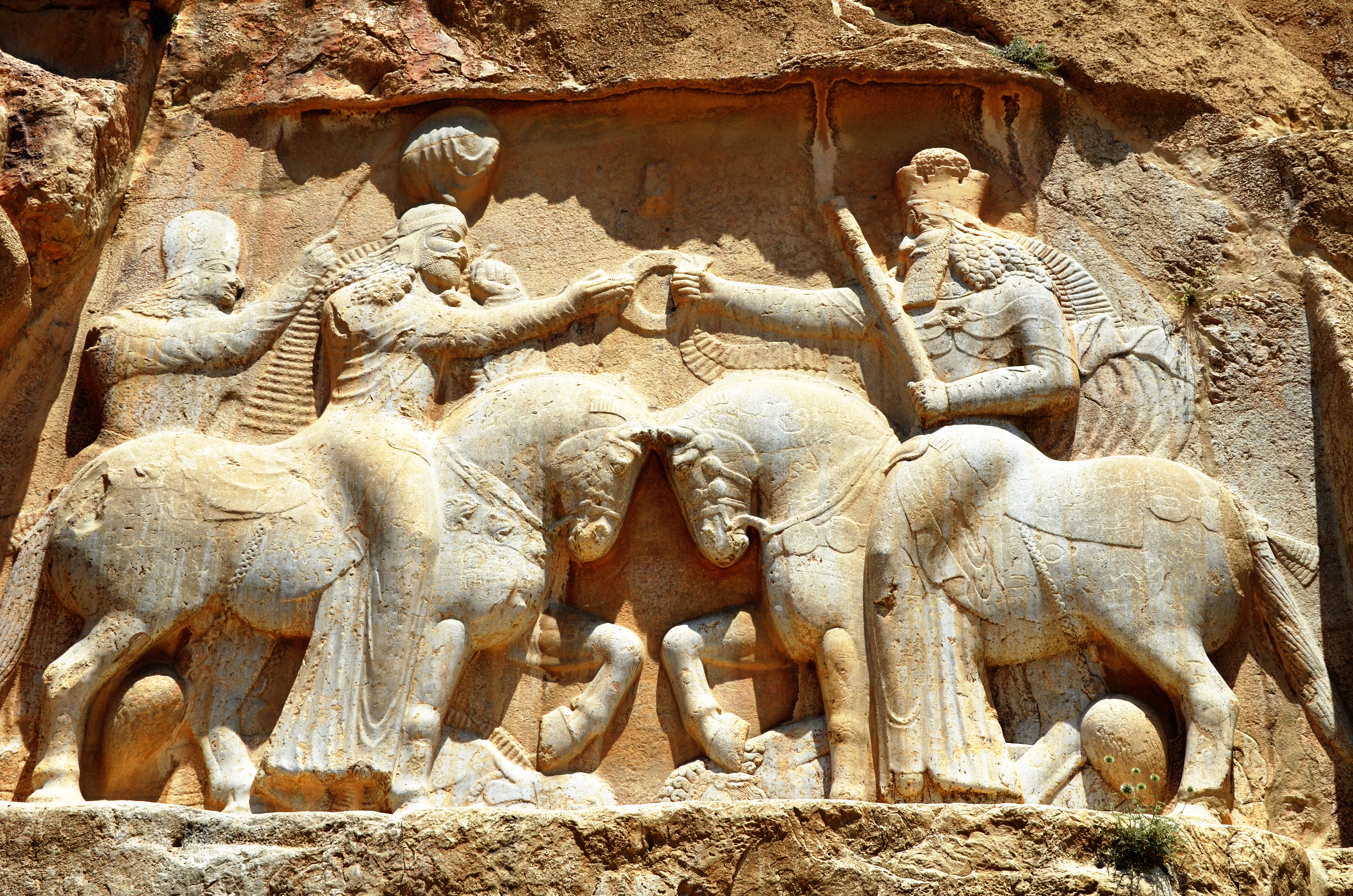
Rostam carving at Naqsh-e Rustam

Notable people with the surname include:

- Abu Sa'id al-Rustami (fl. 10th century), poet in the Buyid amirate
- Kamal Khan Rustami (fl. 1649), poet in the Sultanate of Bijapur
- Abbas Kia Rostami (1940–2016), Iranian film director and producer
- Jamil Rostami (born 1971), Iranian film director
- Kianoush Rostami (born 1991), Iranian weightlifter
- Mohammad Rostami (born 1985), Iranian footballer
- Morteza Rostami (born 1980), Iranian taekwondo athlete
- Rahim Rostami (born 1991), Kurdish asylum seeker
- Rouhollah Rostami, Iranian Paralympic powerlifter
- Shahram Rostami (born 1948), Iranian fighter pilot

== See also ==
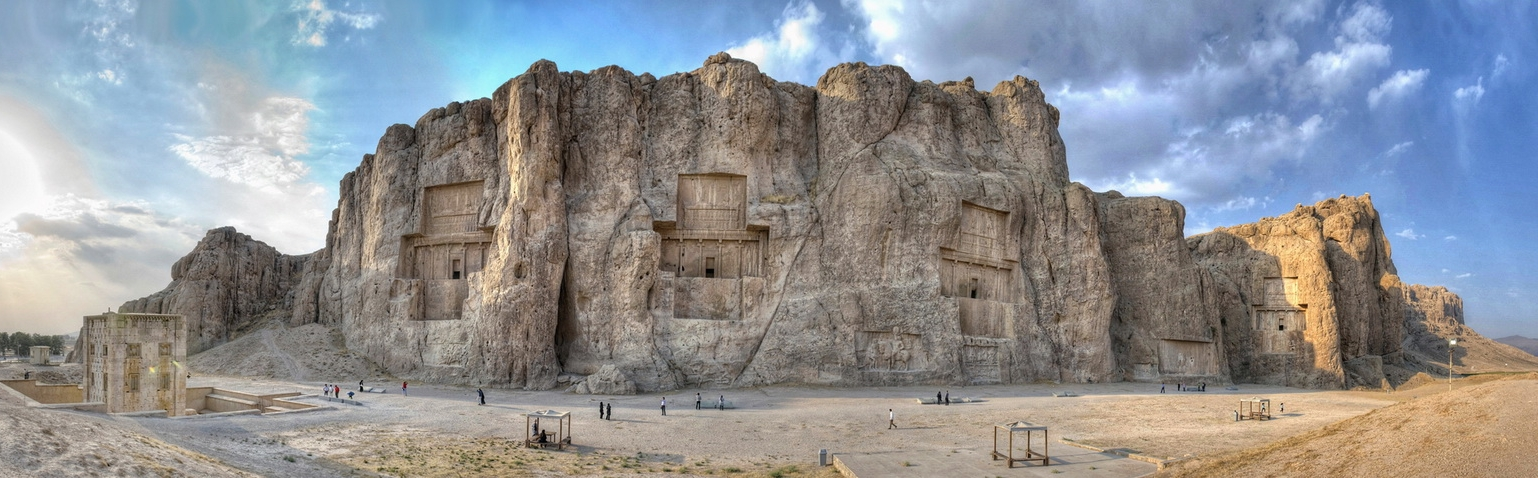
Naghshe Rostam (1200 BC)

- Rostam (the hero)
- Rostam (name)
- Rostami (disambiguation)
