= Rostam (disambiguation) =

Rostam (Persian: رستم) is a legendary hero in Persian mythology.

Rostam may also refer to:

== Places ==
- Rostam County, Fars Province, Iran
  - Poshtkuh-e Rostam Rural District
  - Rostam-e Do Rural District
  - Rostam-e Seh Rural District
  - Rostam-e Yek Rural District
- Rostam, Sistan and Baluchestan, Iran

== People ==
- Rostam (name)
- Rostam Aziz, Tanzanian businessman and politician
- Rostam Farrokhzād, 7th century Iranian dynast
- Rostam Batmanglij (born 1983), American singer-songwriter

== Other uses ==
- IIS Rostam, later Iranian frigate Sabalan

== See also ==
- Rostami (disambiguation)
- Rustom (disambiguation)
- Rustum (disambiguation)
- Rostam and Sohrab, a Persian tale about Rostam
  - Rostam and Sohrab (opera), by Loris Tjeknavorian
  - Rustam Sohrab, a 1963 Indian film by Vishram Bedekar
- Rustam-e-Hind (lit. 'Champion of India'), wrestling title in India
- Chhupa Rustam (lit. 'Hidden Rustam/Champion'), a 1973 Indian film
- Chhupa Rustam (2001 film), a 2001 Indian film by Aziz Sejawal
- DRDO Rustom, an unmanned aerial vehicle of India
