= Akhmetzyanov =

Akhmetzyanov (Russian: Ахметзянов, Tatar: Әхмәтҗанов, romanized: Äxmätcanov / Əxmətcanov) is a Tatar surname, which is derived from the Arabic ʾAḥmad (أحمد), Persian Jān (جان) and Russian suffix ov (ов). Notable people with the surname include:

- Ildar Akhmetzyanov (born 1983), Russian footballer and coach
- Rustem Akhmetzyanov (born 1978), Russian footballer
