= Avionics Services Caçador =

Caçador

General information
- Type: Unmanned aerial vehicle
- National origin: Brazil
- Manufacturer: Avionics Services

History
- First flight: February 2016
- Developed from: IAI Heron

The Avionics Services Caçador is a Brazilian multi-role MALE unmanned aerial vehicle (UAV) developed from the Israeli IAI Heron with transfer of technology.

The Caçador was developed by Avionics Services with support from a local IAI subsidiary that supplied know-how and technology. IAI Brasil acquired forty percent of the company, keeping Avionics Services under the benefit of the national law on "Strategic Defense Company" that requires two thirds of non-foreign ownership.

== Specifications ==
Data from

General characteristics

- Capacity: 250 kg (551 lb)
- Length: 8.5 m (27 ft 11 in)
- Wingspan: 16.6 m (54 ft 6 in)
- Max takeoff weight: 1,270 kg (2,800 lb)

Performance

- Maximum speed: 207 km/h (129 mph, 112 kn)
- Range: 350 km (220 mi, 190 nmi)
- Endurance: 40 hours
- Service ceiling: 9,100 m (29,900 ft)
