= Rustum =

Rustum may refer to:

- Rostam, hero of the Persian epic Shahnameh
- Rustum (1984 film), an Indian Telugu-language action film
- Rustum (2019 film), an Indian Kannada-language crime thriller film
- Rustum Ghazaleh (1953–2015), Syrian military and intelligence officer
- Rustum Kozain (born 1966), South African poet and writer
- Rustum Roy (1924–2010), Indian-born American physicist

== See also ==
- Rustom (disambiguation)
- Rustam (disambiguation)
- Rustumpur, village in Karnataka, India
- Rostam and Sohrab, a tale from the Persian epic Shahnameh, about the hero Rostam and his son Sohrab
  - Sohrab and Rustum, an 1853 poem by Matthew Arnold
