= Rüstem =

Rüstem is a Turkish spelling of the Persian masculine given name Rostam (Persian: رستم rustam), which is from the name of the Persian mythic hero Rostam. It may refer to:

- Rüstem Pasha (c. 1500–1561), Ottoman grand vizier
  - Rüstem Pasha Mosque, Ottoman mosque dedicated to him

== See also ==
- Rustem (name)
- Rustam (name)
- Rostam (name)
