= Rostamabad-e Chah Degan =

Rostamabad-e Chah Degan رستم ابادچاهدگان
- Village
- Location within Iran
- Coordinates: 28°51′00″N 59°17′00″E
- Country: Iran
- Province: Kerman
- County: Fahraj
- Bakhsh: Negin Kavir
- Rural District: Chahdegal

Population (2006)
  - Total: 58
- Time zone: UTC+3:30 (IRST)
  - Summer (DST): UTC+4:30 (IRDT)

Rostamabad-e Chah Degan (Persian: رستم ابادچاهدگان, also Romanized as Rostamābād-e Chāh Degān; also known as Rostamābād-e Chāh Degāl) is a village in Chahdegal Rural District, Negin Kavir District, Fahraj County, Kerman Province, Iran. At the 2006 census, its population was 58, in 13 families.
