= Rostami =

Rostami may refer to:

- Rostami (place), including a list of places with the name
- Rostami (surname), including a list of people with the name

== See also ==
- Rostam (disambiguation)
