= Rostamabad, Andika =

Rostamabad رستم اباد
- Village
- Location within Iran
- Coordinates: 32°11′14″N 49°30′13″E
- Country: Iran
- Province: Khuzestan
- County: Andika
- Bakhsh: Central
- Rural District: Qaleh-ye Khvajeh

Population (2006)
  - Total: 286
- Time zone: UTC+3:30 (IRST)
  - Summer (DST): UTC+4:30 (IRDT)

Rostamabad (Persian: رستم اباد, also Romanized as Rostamābād; also known as Shahrak-e Emām Khomeynī) is a village in Qaleh-ye Khvajeh Rural District, in the Central District of Andika County, Khuzestan Province, Iran. At the 2006 census, its population was 286, in 49 families.
