= Rostamabad, Qaleh Ganj =

Rostamabad رستم اباد
- Village
- Interactive map of Rostamabad
- Country: Iran
- Province: Kerman
- County: Qaleh Ganj
- Bakhsh: Central
- Rural District: Qaleh Ganj

Population (2006)
  - Total: 330
- Time zone: UTC+3:30 (IRST)
  - Summer (DST): UTC+4:30 (IRDT)

Rostamabad (Persian: رستم اباد, also Romanized as Rostamābād) is a village in Qaleh Ganj Rural District, in the Central District of Qaleh Ganj County, Kerman Province, Iran. At the 2006 census, its population was 330, in 67 families.
