= Rustam (Haqqani network) =

Taliban leader

- Known for: Listed for two years on an ISAF list of targets

Mullah Rustam is a citizen of Afghanistan, and an alleged Taliban leader. According to Der Spiegel Rustam was among at least 13 Afghans added to the Joint Prioritized Effects List, at the request of the Bundeswehr. They reported he and Qari Jabar were added in 2007 and removed in 2009. They reported Rustam was the 74th name on the list.

Der Spiegel reports Rustam was reported to have been leading fighters in the Haqqani network in the region of Afghanistan the International Security Assistance Force assigned to Germany as early as 2005.
