= IAI Heron =

Long-endurance unmanned aerial vehicle

Heron
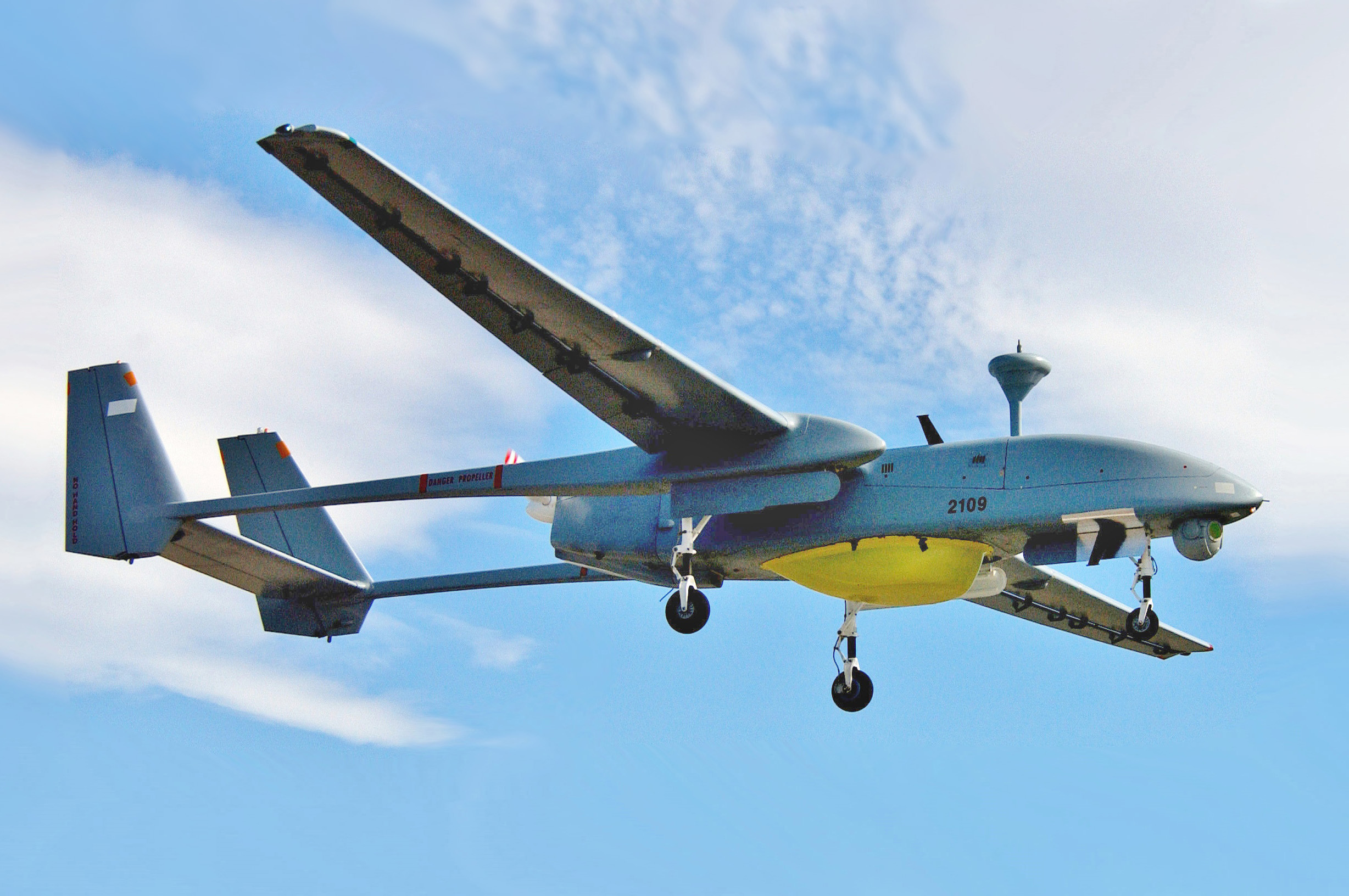
- IAI Heron 1 UAV in flight

General information
- Type: Unmanned surveillance and reconnaissance aerial vehicle
- National origin: Israel
- Manufacturer: Israel Aerospace Industries
- Status: Active, in production
- Primary users: Israeli Defence Force Indian Air Force; Azerbaijan Air Force; Brazilian Federal Police; Turkish Air Force

History
- Introduction date: 2005
- First flight: 1994
- Variants: EADS Harfang; IAI Eitan; Avionics Services Caçador

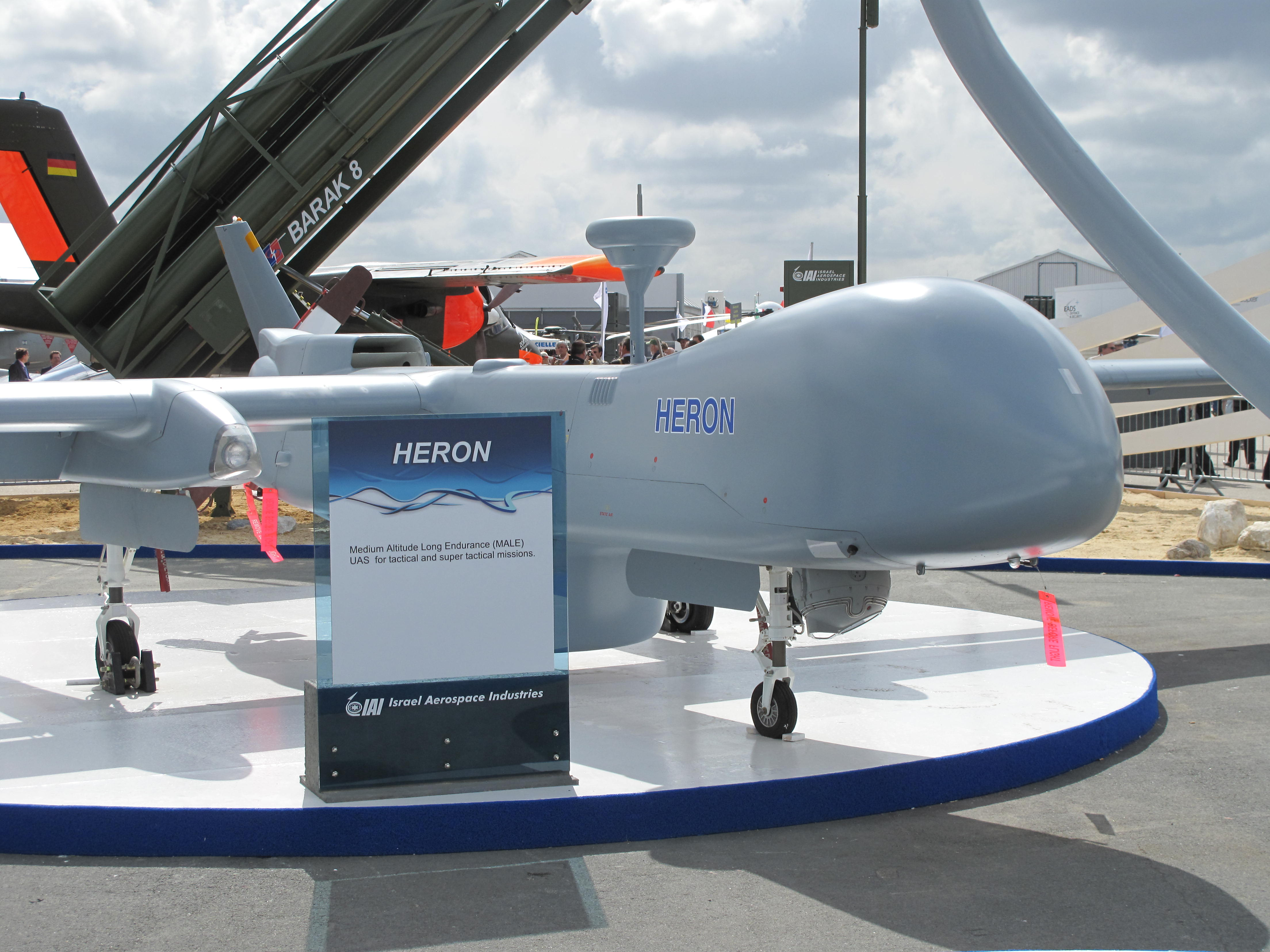
IAI Heron on display at the Paris Air Show 2009

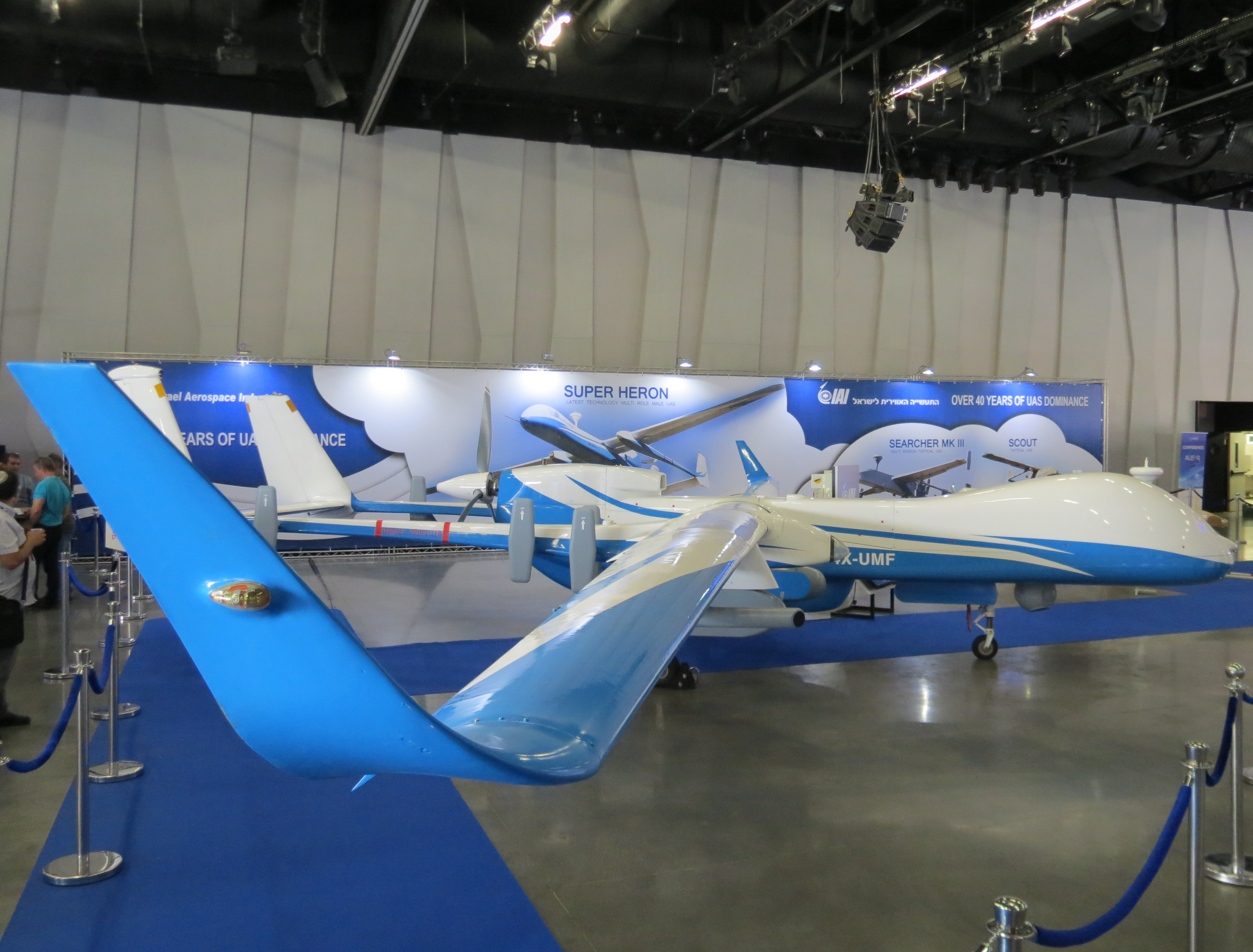
IAI Super Heron at an Air Show to commemorate 40 years of UAVs in Israel

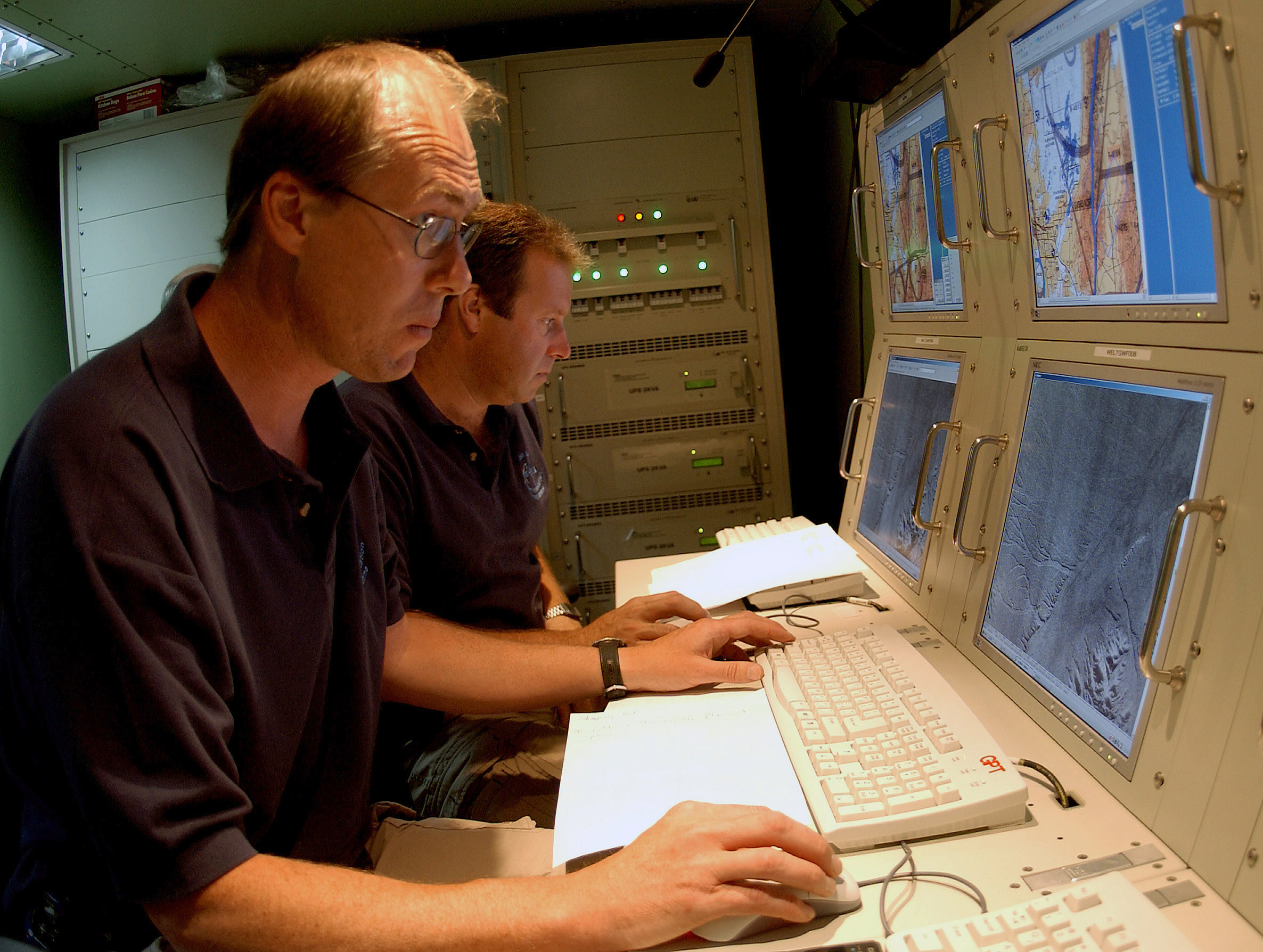
Controlling the UAV for experimental purposes at the Fallon Naval Air Station

The IAI Heron (Machatz-1) is a medium-altitude long-endurance unmanned aerial vehicle (MALE UAV) developed by the Malat (UAV) division of Israel Aerospace Industries. It is capable of Medium Altitude Long Endurance (MALE) operations of up to 52 hours' duration at up to 10.5 km (35,000 ft). It has demonstrated 52 hours of continuous flight, but the effective operational maximal flight duration is less, according to payload and flight profile. An advanced version, the Heron TP, is also known as the IAI Eitan.

On 11 September 2005, it was announced that the Israel Defense Forces purchased US$50 million worth of Heron systems.

== Design and development ==
The Heron navigates using an internal GPS navigation device, and either a pre-programmed flight profile (in which case the system is fully autonomous from takeoff to landing), manual override from a ground control station, or a combination of both. It can autonomously return to base and land in case of lost communication with the ground station. The system has fully automatic launch and recovery (ALR) and all-weather capabilities.

The Heron can carry an array of sensors, including thermographic camera (infrared) and visible-light airborne ground surveillance, intelligence systems (COMINT and ELINT) and various radar systems, totaling up to 250 kg (550 lb). The Heron is also capable of target acquisition and artillery adjustment.

The payload sensors communicate with the ground control station in real time, using either direct line of sight data link, or via an airborne/satellite relay. Like the navigation system, the payload can also be used in either a fully pre-programmed autonomous mode, or manual real-time remote operation, or a combination of both.

=== Super Heron ===
At the February 2014 Singapore Air Show, IAI unveiled the Super Heron refinement of the Heron UAS. The Super Heron has a 200-horsepower diesel engine that increases its rate of climb and performance. Its range is 250 km (160 mi) line-of-sight and 1,000 km (620 mi) by satellite control. Endurance is 45 hours at a maximum altitude of 30,000 ft (9,100 m). Cruising speed is 60 to 80 kn (110 to 150 km/h; 69 to 92 mph) and top speed over 150 kn (280 km/h; 170 mph).

== Operational history ==
The Heron saw significant use during Operation Cast Lead in Gaza of (2008–2009). During the deployment, each brigade combat team was assigned a UAV squadron for close support. This was the first Israeli operation in which UAVs, helicopters, and fighter jets were allocated to ground forces directly without IAF central command authorizing sorties. Air-support controller teams operated alongside brigade commanders at the front emphasizing the brigade commander's utilization of direct air assets. A high degree of situational awareness was achieved by maintaining at least a dozen UAVs in flight over Gaza at all times. Aerial surveillance was provided by Heron and Hermes 450 UAVs and Apache attack helicopters. Along with coordination between the air force and ground troops, Israeli ground forces were able to utilize cooperation with the Israel Security Agency by having operatives attached to the forward units. This inter-service coordination allowed for a higher level of tactical awareness and the ability to strike time-critical targets. During the Gaza war, a super Heron UAV was reported to have been shot down, making it the first time one has been lost in combat against Palestinian militants, with PIJ claiming responsibility for the downing. Other countries operating the Heron include Singapore, India and Turkey. France operates a derivative of Heron named Eagle or Harfang. In 2008, Canada announced a plan to lease a Heron for use in Afghanistan, starting in 2009. In mid-2009, Australia leased two Herons as part of a multimillion-dollar lease to operate the vehicles in Afghanistan. In early July 2013, the Heron reached 15,000 flight hours over Afghanistan. Australia concluded its use of the Heron in support of Operation Slipper in Afghanistan on 30 November 2014, after it had accumulated 27,000 flight hours. Royal Australian Air Force retired two Herons in June 2017.

Beginning in 2021, Malta-based Herons have been used by Frontex, the European Border and Coast Guard Agency, to monitor migrant activity in the southern Mediterranean Sea. This activity drew controversy when it was announced that the data gathered would be shared with countries including Libya and Tunisia. The concern was that the data could be used to force irregular migrants back to their point of departure, denying them the opportunity to seek asylum in other countries.

=== India ===
The Indian Armed Forces initially purchased 12 Heron drones along with Searcher drones from IAI in 2002. The purchase was as a result of the report from the Kargil Review Committee. However, the satisfactory performance of the drone during the multiple search and rescue missions after 2004 tsunami led to planning of an additional order of 50 Heron UAVs. Though the contract negotiations were over by 2004 end, the contract signing was delayed to 2005 due to Lok Sabha elections. The contract was worth $220 million. The drone costs ₹80 crore (equivalent to ₹85 crore or US$8.8 million in 2026) per unit. As of 2009, the Indian Navy operated four Heron UAVs along with eight Searcher II drones. The UAVs formed the innermost layer, up to 200 nmi (370 km; 230 mi), of the three-tier maritime surveillance grid. The Navy planned to acquire two additional Heron UAVs with three ground control stations and two ship control stations at a cost of ₹386 crore (equivalent to ₹11 billion or US$110 million in 2026).

In case of the Indian Army, the drones were initially deployed by the Regiment of Artillery for target acquisition roles to assist artillery units. However, after the 2020 China-India standoff, the Heron units of the Eastern Command were moved to Army Aviation Corps by August 2021 and the routine surveillance sorties per day were doubled. This move was done to allow the drones to take part in wide range of operations. Post reorganisation, the Heron UAVs were placed under the Army Aviation Brigade at Missamari, Assam which includes three squadrons. Each squadron has one Remotely Piloted Aircraft (RPA) flights equipped with Herons. Three flights included a total of 14 UAVs of the Eastern Command.

==== Additional purchase ====
On 14 July 2020, reports indicated that the Indian Air Force intended to purchase additional units of Heron Mk1 UAVs to complement the existing fleet. The quantity was not revealed.

On 18 September 2025, the Asian News International reported that the Indian Armed Forces plan to acquire additional Heron drones following its success in Operation Sindoor. The Army is also expected to equip the drones with air-launched Spike NLOS anti-tank missiles.

==== Project Cheetah ====
Project Cheetah was a programme of the Indian Armed Forces to upgrade and weaponise their existing fleet of around 90 Heron UAVs.

The project gain fast-track approval from the Defence Acquisition Council (DAC) on 14 July 2021. Around 90 drones were to be upgraded with satellite communication (SATCOM), advanced reconnaissance equipment and ability to fire laser-guided bombs, air-launched anti-tank guided missiles and other precision-guided munitions. The programme will cost around ₹3,500 crore (equivalent to ₹43 billion or US$450 million in 2026). The cost negotiation was completed around 2021-22. After this, the proposal was sent to the Cabinet Committee on Security for final approval.

On 19 September 2022, it was reported that the upgrades would be carried out by manufacturing units of Indian firms with assistance from Israel. In the current variant, the equipment of the UAVs includes thermographic camera, airborne ground surveillance, visible light, radar systems, etc. The project was reportedVs were expected to undergo upgrades in two phases. In the first phase, "in the last stage of decision-making".

The UAVs were to be upgraded in two phases. In the first phase, the SATCOM and sensor suite was upgradation would be carried out. SATCOM capability would enhance the range to unlimited of the UAVs which is restricted to the within visual range of 200–250 km (120–160 mi). However, in 2023, it was reported that India has dropped plans to arm the Heron drones in the Armed Forces and the other upgrades would be carried out within India. The report stated that the airspace that India has to fight in is heavily contested and is not very suitable for drone warfare.

==== Heron Mk2 ====
It was reported in May 2021 that Indian Army was negotiating with IAI to lease 4 units of Heron TP UAVs under the emergency procurement powers of the Armed Forces. The drones would be leased for three years and 2 of the drones would arrive by August. The advanced variants of the drone will have automatic taxi-takeoff and landing (ATOL) and SATCOM systems. However, after contract signing, it was corrected that the drones would not be leased but purchased and the variant is Heron Mk2. A total of 10 Heron Mk2 have been ordered including 4 units for Army and 6 units for the Air Force.

Two of the UAVs were inducted by the Indian Army in November 2022 and deployed along the Line of Actual Control (LAC) at Leh, Ladakh. The rest of the 2 units were inducted in Northeast India by September-end the same year.

In August 2023, Indian Air Force inducted 4 Heron Mk2. The drone squadron, nicknamed the "Wardens of the North", was deployed in the northern sector under the commissioning Commanding Officer Wing Commander Pankaj Rana. In November 2023, the Indian Air Force placed an order for two more Heron Mk2 UAVs in addition to the current four by using emergency procurement powers.

Further orders for Mk2 were placed by all the three services of the Indian Armed Forces, including the Indian Navy, following Operation Sindoor.

==== Crashes ====
As of 2024, India has lost 12 Heron Mk1 UAVs since it was inducted into service in 2002. The crashes are attributed to several reasons like human errors, engine failures as well as loss of contact with Ground Control Stations (GCS).

- In November 2005, it was reported that after induction of Heron UAVs in 2002 at least four UAVs were lost within 2 years. The first instance of the crash occurred in 2003 on a forward airbase in Rajasthan. While one of the crashes was attributed to human error, the others were due to technical issues and included the death of an IAF handler. Two drones of Army and Air Force each were lost.

On 13 December 2013, one of the IAI Heron of INAS 344, bearing registration number INAS 922, crashed into the grove at Usilankattuvalasai after taking off from INS Parundu at 3:10 pm IST. After the aircraft crashed behind the naval station, the rotor blades broke into pieces, and "the engine part was found between palm and coconut trees". The remains were salvaged by 50 naval civilians.

- On 26 November 2014, a Heron UAV operated by the Indian Air Force crashed in the Mankunva village, around 40 km (25 mi) from Bhuj of Kutch district, Gujarat.
- On 9 January 2015, a Heron UAV of the IAF crashed in Akoda village, 30 km (19 mi) north west of Barmer district, Rajasthan. The crash was due to engine failure after taking off from Jaisalmer AFS. There were no damage to life or property.
- On 18 March 2016, a Heron UAV of the INAS 342 squadron of the Indian Navy suffered an engine failure during a routine surveillance mission near the Kerala coast and had to be ditched into sea in a controlled manner. Later, parts of aircraft including the engine was recovered. The Navy has around 10 Herons.
- On 7 December 2017, a Heron UAV of the Indian Army was lost in a cross-border crash during a routine training mission. While being operated near the Line of Actual Control (LAC) over the Indian territory in the Sikkim sector, the UAV lost contact with its Ground Control Station mid-flight and veered off the course into Tibet and crashed. The wreckage was recovered by Chinese troops. The event occurred after the Doklam standoff. The UAV was equipped with sensitive Israeli-origin sensors to detect presence of troops, vehicles, airborne radars and track distant movements. The payload lost weighed 250 kg (550 lb).

The INAS 343 squadron of the Indian Navy lost both of the Heron drones in two separate crashes on 22 March and 14 April 2018, respectively. The first crash occurred minutes after takeoff at around 10 am IST due to engine failure, however, did not cause any loss of life or property. The drone was operational through manual mode. The second crash occurred due to loss of communication data link with the Ground Control Station (GCS) while the drone was on a routine surveillance mission. The crash occurred 25 km (16 mi) away from INS Sardar Patel at Porbandar at 1 pm IST.

- 25 April 2024, an IAF Heron crash in Dhani Jajoya village, which is 30 km (19 mi) from Jaisalmer, Rajasthan.
- On 10 April 2025, one of the leased Indian Army Heron Mk2 crashed at Satwari Airport at around 2:45 pm IST while returning from a reconnaissance mission. The incident, under investigation, occurred after loss of control while landing. The aircraft crashed into an IAF tower at the airport, injuring an DSC personnel (Naik Surinder Pal).

== Heron variants ==
- Turkey operates a special variant of the Heron, which utilizes Turkish-designed and manufactured electro-optical subsystems. For example, the Turkish Herons use the ASELFLIR-300T airborne thermal Imaging and targeting system designed and manufactured by ASELSAN of Turkey. The Turkish Herons also have stronger engines in order to compensate for the added payload created by the heavier ASELFLIR-300T. This is the same FLIR system currently used in the TAI/AgustaWestland T129 attack helicopter and also the TAI Anka MALE UAV. IAI staff maintain that the Turkish Heron's "with its enhanced performance, is better than all existing Heron UAVs operating worldwide". Turkish Aerospace Industries (TUSAŞ) provides maintenance and overhaul services for its Herons.
- EADS Harfang – variant operated by France

== Operators ==
All exports of the IAI Heron are unarmed.

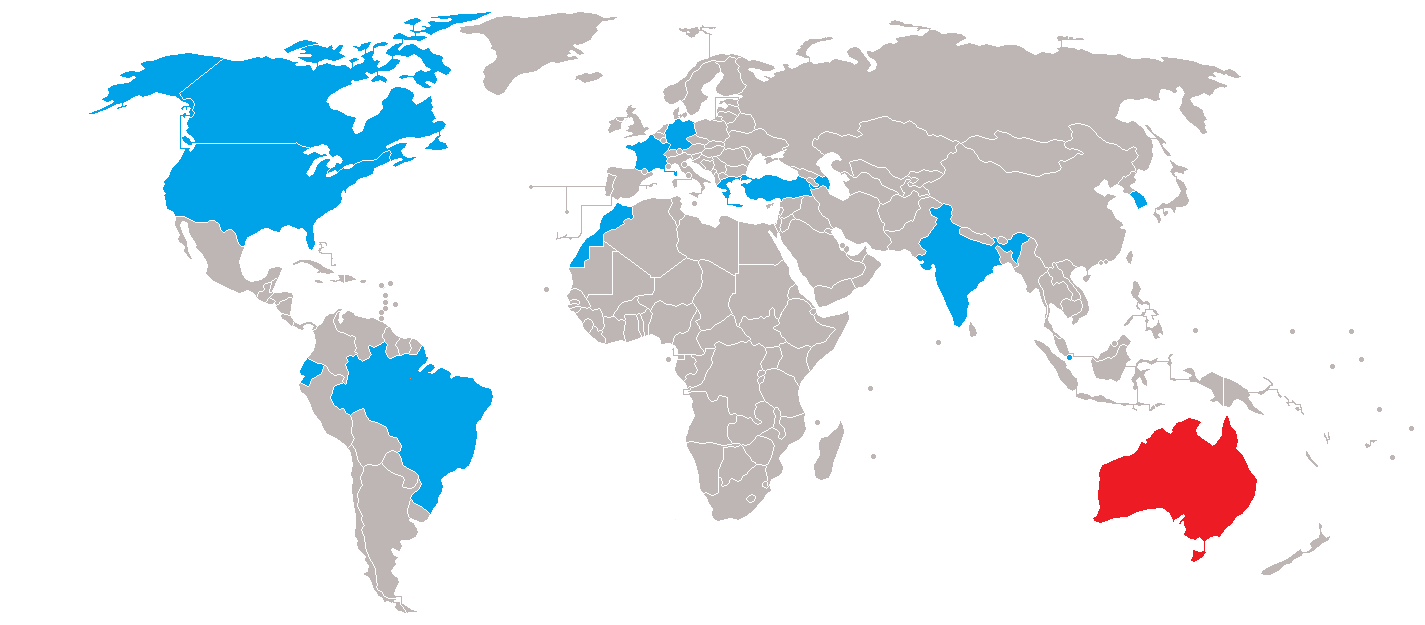
Map with military IAI Heron UAV operators in blue, with former operators in red

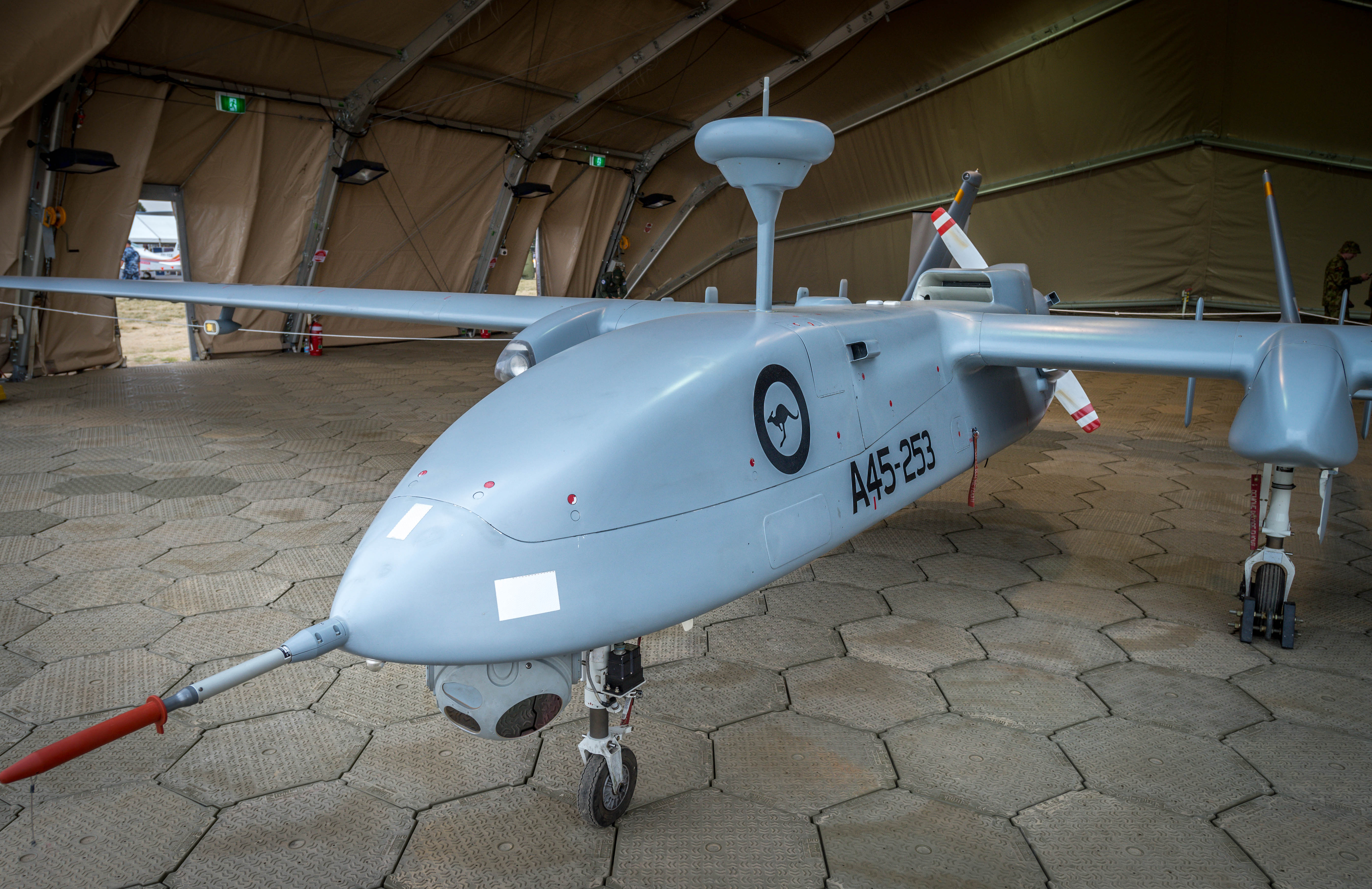
Royal Australian Air Force Heron RPA

Azerbaijan

- Azerbaijani Air Forces – 5

Brazil

- Brazilian Air Force – 2 (formerly with Federal Police)
- Brazilian Federal Police – 2 (transferred to Air Force)

Canada

- Royal Canadian Air Force – 2 in service as of 2011, formerly operated 3

Ecuador

- Ecuadorian Navy – 2

European Union

- European Border and Coast Guard Agency – at least 1

Germany

- German Air Force – 3, including 2 ground stations on an initial one-year lease starting since 2010, with 2-3 more being planned. Will be replaced by the Eurodrone

Greece

- Hellenic Air Force – 2+1 on lease starting December 2019 which entered service in June 2021
- Hellenic Coast Guard

India – Total 68 Heron Mk1 received.

- Indian Army – >30 Heron Mk1 (including 14 under Eastern Command). 4 Heron Mk2.
- Indian Air Force – Unknown quantity of Heron Mk1. 4 Heron Mk2 with 2 on order.
- Indian Navy – around 8 Heron Mk1.

Israel

- Israeli Defence Force – at least 1

South Korea

- Republic of Korea Army – 3 on order as of 2014

Malta

- Maltese Air Force – 1

Morocco

- Royal Moroccan Air Force – three bought in 2014

Singapore

- Republic of Singapore Air Force – 2

Turkey

- Turkish Air Force – 10

United States

- United States Navy – 2

Vietnam

- Vietnam People's Navy – 3

=== Former operators ===
Australia

- Royal Australian Air Force – 2, retired in 2017

== Specifications ==
Data from Heron/Shoval/Eitan

General characteristics

- Capacity: 250 kg (551 lb)
- Length: 8.5 m (27 ft 11 in)
- Wingspan: 16.6 m (54 ft 6 in)
- Airfoil: IAI SA-21
- Max takeoff weight: 1,150 kg (2,535 lb)
- Powerplant: 1 × Rotax 916 4-cylinder air and water cooled horizontally-opposed piston engine, 160 kW (210 hp)
- Propellers: 3-bladed pusher propeller

Performance

- Maximum speed: 207 km/h (129 mph, 112 kn)
- Endurance: 52 hours
- Service ceiling: 10,000 m (33,000 ft)
- Rate of climb: 2.5 m/s (490 ft/min)
- Wing loading: 89 kg/m^{2} (18 lb/sq ft)

== See also ==
Related development

- IAI Eitan
- EADS Harfang
- Avionics Services Caçador

Aircraft of comparable role, configuration, and era

- General Atomics MQ-1 Predator
- DRDO Rustom
- IAIO Fotros
- TAI Anka
- Baykar Bayraktar TB2
