= Abu Sa'id al-Rustami =

Persian poet

Abu Sa'id al-Rustami was a Persian poet of the 10th-century, who wrote in Arabic during the Buyid era.

Most of the information about Abu Sa'id's life and poems is given by the Yatimat al-dahr, an anthology of al-Tha'alibi (died 1038). Abu Sa'id was given the name of "al-Rustami" after an ancestor six generations earlier who was called Rustam. Abu Sa'id's father was a Persian, while his mother was an Arab from the Al Junayd. Abu Sa'id was born and raised in the city of Isfahan, then a hub centre for poetry and literature. During this period, the literary elite of Isfahan was mainly Sunnite and pro-Hanbalite, and preferred to write in Arabic.

Some of Abu Sa'id's poems have been highlighted by modern historians. Both Ignaz Goldziher and David A. Wacks consider a particular poem of his to have been shu'ubiyya in nature, i.e. promoting superiority over non-Arabs. The poem in question is the following;

If I am asked about descent I am of the tribe of Rustam

but my song is of Lu'ayy ibn Ghalib. I am the one who is publicly and secretly known as a Persian whom Arabianism drew to itself.

I know well when calling the parole

that my origin is clear and my wood hard.

Goldziher states that this poem was part of the "last tones of Persian complaints against the Arabs." However, Mohammad Ali Lesani Fesharaki believes there is not enough evidence to support this claim, and considers the poem to simply be a boast about being Persian.

According to Victor Danner, al-Rustami "seems to incarnate the question of cultural affinity."

== Sources ==
- Danner, Victor (1975). "Arabic literature in Iran". In Frye, Richard N. (ed.). The Cambridge History of Iran. Vol. 4. Cambridge: Cambridge University Press. pp. 566–594. ISBN 0-521-20093-8.
- Fesharaki, Mohammad Ali Lesani (2015). "Abū Saʿīd al-Rustamī". In Madelung, Wilferd; Daftary, Farhad (eds.). Encyclopaedia Islamica Online. Brill Online. ISSN 1875-9831.
- Goldziher, Ignaz (1967). Muslim Studies: Volume 1. Suny Press. ISBN 978-1138528536.
- Kamaly, Hossein (2006). "Isfahan vi. Medieval period". In Yarshater, Ehsan (ed.). Encyclopædia Iranica. Vol. XIII/6: Iraq V. Safavid period–Isfahan VIII. Qajar period. London and New York: Routledge & Kegan Paul. pp. 641–650. ISBN 978-0-933273-94-8.
- Wacks, David A. (2015). Double Diaspora in Sephardic Literature: Jewish Cultural Production Before and After 1492. Indiana University Press. ISBN 978-0253015723.
