= Rustem Kanipov =

Russian footballer

Personal information
- Full name: Rustem Rinatovich Kanipov
- Date of birth: 22 January 1982 (age 44)
- Place of birth: Kazan, Russian SFSR
- Height: 1.85 m (6 ft 1 in)
- Positions: Defender; midfielder

Youth career
- FC Rubin Kazan

Senior career*
Years	Team	Apps	(Gls)
2000	FC Rubin Kazan	0	(0)
2000	FC Diana Volzhsk	2	(0)
2001	FC Rubin Kazan	1	(0)
2002	FC Spartak Shchyolkovo	32	(0)
2003	FC Rubin-2 Kazan (amateur)		
2004	FC Rubin-2 Kazan	34	(2)
2005	FC Sokol Saratov	4	(0)
2005–2006	FC Rubin-2 Kazan	46	(1)
2007–2008	FC Rotor Volgograd	37	(1)
2008	FC Mordovia Saransk	17	(1)
2009	FC Gubkin	24	(0)
2010	FC Rubin-2 Kazan	13	(0)
2010–2012	FC Chelyabinsk	48	(3)
2012–2013	FC Volga Ulyanovsk	27	(3)
2013–2014	FC Zenit-Izhevsk Izhevsk	32	(3)
2015	FC Oryol	1	(0)
- * Club domestic league appearances and goals

Rustem Rinatovich Kanipov (Russian: Рустэм Ринатович Канипов; born 22 January 1982) is a former Russian professional football player.

== Club career ==
He played two seasons in the Russian Football National League for FC Rubin Kazan and FC Sokol Saratov.
