= Carabus rustemi =

Scientific classification
- Domain: Eukaryota
- Kingdom: Animalia
- Phylum: Arthropoda
- Class: Insecta
- Order: Coleoptera
- Suborder: Adephaga
- Family: Carabidae
- Genus: Carabus
- Species: C. rustemi

Binomial name
- Carabus rustemi Kabak, 2009

Species of beetle

Carabus rustemi is a species of black coloured ground beetle in the Carabinae subfamily that is endemic to Kazakhstan.
