= Baba Rostam, Kurdistan =

Baba Rostam بابارستم
- Village
- Location within Iran
- Coordinates: 36°00′06″N 47°41′11″E
- Country: Iran
- Province: Kurdistan
- County: Bijar
- Bakhsh: Central
- Rural District: Khvor Khvoreh

Population (2006)
  - Total: 98
- Time zone: UTC+3:30 (IRST)
  - Summer (DST): UTC+4:30 (IRDT)

Baba Rostam (Persian: بابارستم, also Romanized as Bābā Rostam; also known as Bārā Rostam and Būwār Hasan) is a village in Khvor Khvoreh Rural District, in the Central District of Bijar County, Kurdistan Province, Iran. At the 2006 census, its population was 98, in 24 families. The village is populated by Kurds.
