= Rostamabad, Lorestan =

Rostamabad رستم آباد
- Village
- Country: Iran
- Province: Lorestan
- County: Delfan
- Bakhsh: Central
- Rural District: Nurabad

Population (2006)
  - Total: 26
- Time zone: UTC+3:30 (IRST)
  - Summer (DST): UTC+4:30 (IRDT)

Rostamabad (Persian: رستم آباد, also romanized as Rostamābād) is a village in Nurabad Rural District, in the Central District of Delfan County, Lorestan Province, Iran. At the time of the 2006 Census, its population was 26, contained within 5 families.
