= Rostamabad, Rudbar-e Jonubi =

Rostamabad رستم اباد
- Village
- Location within Iran
- Coordinates: 27°56′49″N 58°04′05″E
- Country: Iran
- Province: Kerman
- County: Rudbar-e Jonubi
- Bakhsh: Central
- Rural District: Rudbar

Population (2006)
  - Total: 39
- Time zone: UTC+3:30 (IRST)
  - Summer (DST): UTC+4:30 (IRDT)

Rostamabad (Persian: رستم اباد, also Romanized as Rostamābād) is a village in Rudbar Rural District, in the Central District of Rudbar-e Jonubi County, Kerman Province, Iran. At the 2006 census, its population was 39, in 5 families.
