= Rostam K. Saeed =

Iraqi Kurdish mathematician and professor

Rostam Karim Saeed Ismaeel
- Born: 1 July 1964; Arbil, Iraq
- Known for: Computational Methods for Solving System of Volterra Integral Equation
- Spouse: Gashaw A Muhammed-Salih
- Children: Soma R Kareem, Sliva R Kareem, Rewan R Kareem

Rostam Karim Saeed is a Kurdish mathematician and professor from Iraq. He is known for finding methods to solve a system of volterra integral equations.

== Biography ==
Rostam Karim Saeed Ismail was born in July 1964, in a small village outside of Erbil, Iraq. He studied secondary school and high school in the city of Erbil. His fellow students recall him showing extraordinary abilities in both mathematics and chemistry. Rostam was awarded graduated in 1982 at Azady Secondary School. Rostam went to the College of Science at the Salahaddin University-Erbil in Erbil, Iraq.

In July 1987, he was awarded a B.Sc. degree in mathematics. He was awarded a M.Sc. degree in mathematics in June 1990, after he presented a thesis, supervised by the assistant professor, Dr. K. B. Srivastava. And in 1994, he married, Gashaw A Muhammed-Salih, who is a professor in College of Science, University of Salahaddin. Rostam Karim was awarded a PhD degree in mathematics on 16 May 2006, after he presented his thesis entitled "Computational Methods for Solving System of linear Volterra Integral and Integro-differential Equations".

=== Education ===
- 16-5-2006 Awarded PhD in mathematics (numerical analysis), Department of Mathematics, College of Science, University of Salahaddin/Erbil, Iraq
  - Ph.D. Thesis: Computational Methods for Solving System of linear Volterra Integral and Integro-differential Equations (Supervisor: Assistant Professor Dr. Omer M. Al-Faour)
- 23-6-1990 Awarded M.Sc. in mathematics (numerical analysis), Department of Mathematics, College of Science, University of Salahaddin/Erbil, Iraq.
  - M.Sc. Thesis: A study of Lacunary interpolation by Splines (Supervisor: Assistant Professor Dr. K. B. Srivastava)
- 2-7-1987 Awarded B.Sc. in mathematics, Department of Mathematics, College of Science, University of Salahaddin/Erbil, Iraq
- 1981-1982 Awarded Baccalaureate, Azadi Secondary School, Erbil, Iraq

== Scientific career ==
=== Employment History ===
- 12/5/2009 to date: Professor of Mathematics (Numerical Analysis), Department of Mathematics, College of Science, University of Salahaddin/Erbil, Iraq
- 24/12/2000-30/5/2004: The Dean of College of Science, University of Salahaddin/Erbil, Iraq
- 25/7/2000-11/5/2009: Assistant Professor of Mathematics (Numerical Analysis), Department of Mathematics, College of Science, University of Salahaddin/Erbil, Iraq
- 2000 to date: Supervising 9 M.Sc. students and 2 PhD students in Department of Mathematics, College of Science, University of Salahaddin/Erbil, University of Sulaimania and University of Dohuk, Iraq
- 1998-2000: Assistant Dean of College of Science, University of Salahaddin/Erbil, Iraq
- 1997-1998: Manager of Computer Unit, College of Science, University of Salahaddin/Erbil, Iraq
- 1994: Lecturer, Department of Mathematics, College of Science, University of Salahaddin/Erbil, Iraq.
- 1991-1994: Coordinator of Department of Mathematics, College of Science, University of Salahaddin/Erbil, Kurdistan, Iraq.
- 1991: Assistant lecturer, Department of Mathematics, College of Science, University of Salahaddin/Erbil, Iraq.
