= Baba Rostam, Kermanshah =

Baba Rostam بابارستم
- Village
- Location within Iran
- Coordinates: 34°12′04″N 46°04′56″E
- Country: Iran
- Province: Kermanshah
- County: Gilan-e Gharb
- Bakhsh: Govar
- Rural District: Heydariyeh

Population (2006)
  - Total: 240
- Time zone: UTC+3:30 (IRST)
  - Summer (DST): UTC+4:30 (IRDT)

Baba Rostam (Persian: بابارستم, also Romanized as Bābā Rostam) is a village in Heydariyeh Rural District, Govar District, Gilan-e Gharb County, Kermanshah Province, Iran. At the 2006 census, its population was 240, in 51 families.
