= Rostamabad-e Bozorg =

Rostamabad-e Bozorg رستم ابادبزرگ
- Village
- Location within Iran
- Coordinates: 34°34′14″N 48°00′49″E
- Country: Iran
- Province: Kermanshah
- County: Kangavar
- Bakhsh: Central
- Rural District: Gowdin

Population (2006)
  - Total: 431
- Time zone: UTC+3:30 (IRST)
  - Summer (DST): UTC+4:30 (IRDT)

Rostamabad-e Bozorg (Persian: رستم ابادبزرگ, also Romanized as Rostamābād-e Bozorg; also known as Rostamābād) is a village in Gowdin Rural District, in the Central District of Kangavar County, Kermanshah Province, Iran. At the 2006 census, its population was 431, in 111 families.
