= Rustom Damania =

Rustom B. Damania (died 25 March 2001) was a professor at the Indian Institute of Science and Technology. He is credited with the development of NAL's Light Canard Research Aircraft, which later became DRDO Rustom.
