= Rostamabad-e Kuchak =

Rostamabad-e Kuchak رستم ابادكوچك
- Village
- Location within Iran
- Coordinates: 34°28′52″N 47°57′24″E
- Country: Iran
- Province: Kermanshah
- County: Kangavar
- Bakhsh: Central
- Rural District: Kermajan

Population (2006)
  - Total: 512
- Time zone: UTC+3:30 (IRST)
  - Summer (DST): UTC+4:30 (IRDT)

Rostamabad-e Kuchak (Persian: رستم ابادكوچك, also Romanized as Rostamābād-e Kūchak; also known as Rostamābād) is a village in Kermajan Rural District, in the Central District of Kangavar County, Kermanshah Province, Iran. At the 2006 census, its population was 512, in 111 families.
