= Rostami, Hormozgan =

Rostami رستمي
- Village
- Location within Iran
- Coordinates: 26°52′07″N 54°03′44″E
- Country: Iran
- Province: Hormozgan
- County: Bandar Lengeh
- Bakhsh: Shibkaveh
- Rural District: Bandar Charak

Population (2006)
  - Total: 362
- Time zone: UTC+3:30 (IRST)
  - Summer (DST): UTC+4:30 (IRDT)

Rostami (Persian: رستمي, also Romanized as Rostamī) is a village in Bandar Charak Rural District, Shibkaveh District, Bandar Lengeh County, Hormozgan Province, Iran. At the 2006 census, its population was 362, in 70 families. It is an Iranian Arab village.
