= Rostam Kandi, Kurdistan =

Rostam Kandi رستم كندي
- Village
- Location within Iran
- Coordinates: 36°18′44″N 47°37′36″E
- Country: Iran
- Province: Kurdistan
- County: Bijar
- Bakhsh: Korani
- Rural District: Korani

Population (2006)
  - Total: 78
- Time zone: UTC+3:30 (IRST)
  - Summer (DST): UTC+4:30 (IRDT)

Rostam Kandi (Persian: رستم كندي, also Romanized as Rostam Kandī) is a village in Korani Rural District, Korani District, Bijar County, Kurdistan Province, Iran. At the 2006 census, its population was 78, in 19 families. The village is populated by Azerbaijanis.
