= Rostamabad Jamshidi =

Rostamabad Jamshidi رستم آباد جمشيدي
- Village
- Country: Iran
- Province: Lorestan
- County: Khorramabad
- Bakhsh: Bayravand
- Rural District: Beyranvand-e Jonubi

Population (2006)
  - Total: 10
- Time zone: UTC+3:30 (IRST)
  - Summer (DST): UTC+4:30 (IRDT)

Rostamabad Jamshidi (Persian: رستم آباد جمشيدي, also romanized as Rostābād Jamshīdī) is a village in Beyranvand-e Jonubi Rural District, Bayravand District, Khorramabad County, Lorestan Province, Iran. At the 2006 census, its population was 10 people across 4 families.
