= EADS Harfang =

French military reconnaissance drone

Harfang
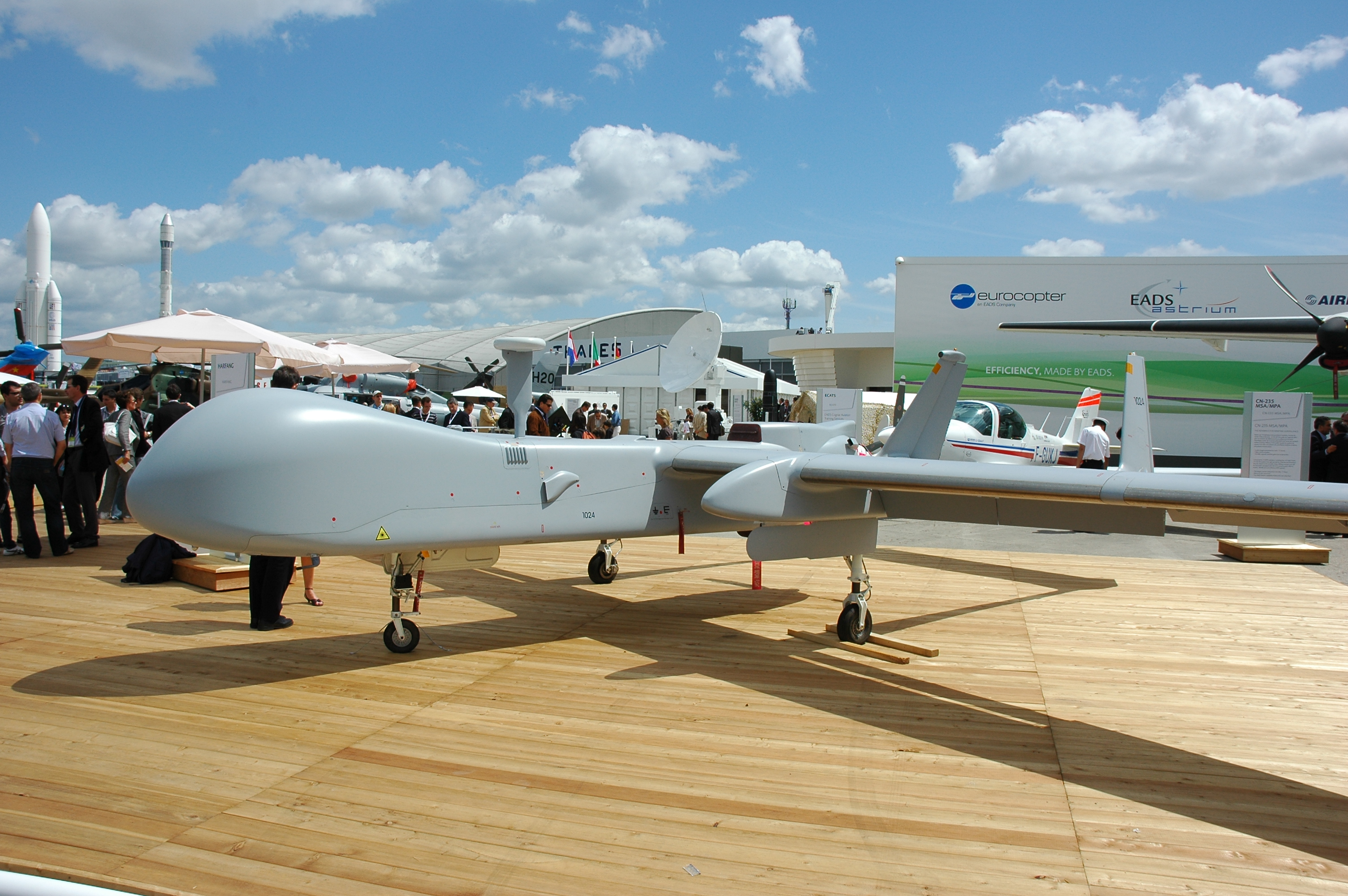

General information
- Type: Unmanned surveillance and reconnaissance aerial vehicle
- Manufacturer: EADS and IAI
- Primary users: French Air Force (historical) Royal Moroccan Air Force
- Number built: 4

History
- Introduction date: June 2008
- First flight: 9 September 2006 at Istres-Le Tubé airbase 125
- Developed from: IAI Heron

The EADS Harfang, formerly known as Système intérimaire de drone MALE (SIDM, "Interim medium-altitude, long-endurance drone system") is an unmanned aerial vehicle used by the French Air Force, supplementing the RQ-5 Hunter.

== Development ==
The French Air Force purchased its first drones in 1995, with multiple RQ-5 Hunter units. The IAI Heron was put on display at the 1999 Paris Air Show and generated some interest; a project to field a derivative was started two years later. On 9 September 2006, a prototype was launched for trials from Istres-Le Tubé Air Base. Trials by the Centre d'essais en vol followed, before transfer of the plane to Mont-de-Marsan Air Base

The drone was originally planned to be delivered to the Air Force for the summer of 2003 as a replacement for the Hunters, which were phased out in September 2004. A number of industrial setbacks delayed the delivery, notably that the satellite communication system did not conform with Air Force requirements. The drones were modified to satisfy the requirements, changing them from an "off-the-shelf" product into a custom plane built specially for the French Air Force. The plane and onboard computer are built by Malat, a division of Israel Aerospace Industries, based on the IAI Heron.

The French Air Force ordered three planes and two ground control stations. The SIDM entered service in June 2008 in the Drone Experimentation Squadron 1/330 Adour, in Cognac, a unit of the Centre des expérimentations militaires. A four-phase programme took place between 2008 and 2009:

- instruction of the squadron in the use of the system
- instruction of the operators in the sensors
- C4ISTAR management and communication to upper levels
- communication with ground forces

== Design ==
The Harfang is composed of two main components: the drone and the ground control station.

=== Drones ===
The Harfang drone is an unmanned airplane propelled by a rear-mounted turbo-supercharged water-cooled flat-four engine, driving a pusher propeller. It features a flapped high wing with anti-icing system, and has a twin boom tail with two vertical surfaces. With a take-off mass of 1,200 kilograms (2,600 lb), the Harfang can carry a 250-kilogram (550 lb) payload to height of 7,500 metres (24,600 ft) for a duration of 24 hours.

The mission pack is a three-sensor sphere stabilised by gyroscope, mounted under the forward part of the fuselage. It contains optronic and IR sensors, a laser designator that doubles as a rangefinder, and a high-resolution, fixed echo suppressing synthetic aperture radar. The radar can be used to observe vehicle movement on the ground under any meteorological condition. The antenna is mounted on the centre of the body.

The Harfang carries an Inertial measurement unit with GPS recalibration, and a differential GPS that provides for automatic take-off and landing capabilities. In case of loss of communications, the drone follows a path that brings it back to its start point, while trying to re-establish contact.

The drone carries an IFF transponder and a flight recorder. The Harfang lacks electromagnetic sensors and is wanting in terms of maneuverability. It is limited by bad weather, notably by icing or high humidity conditions.

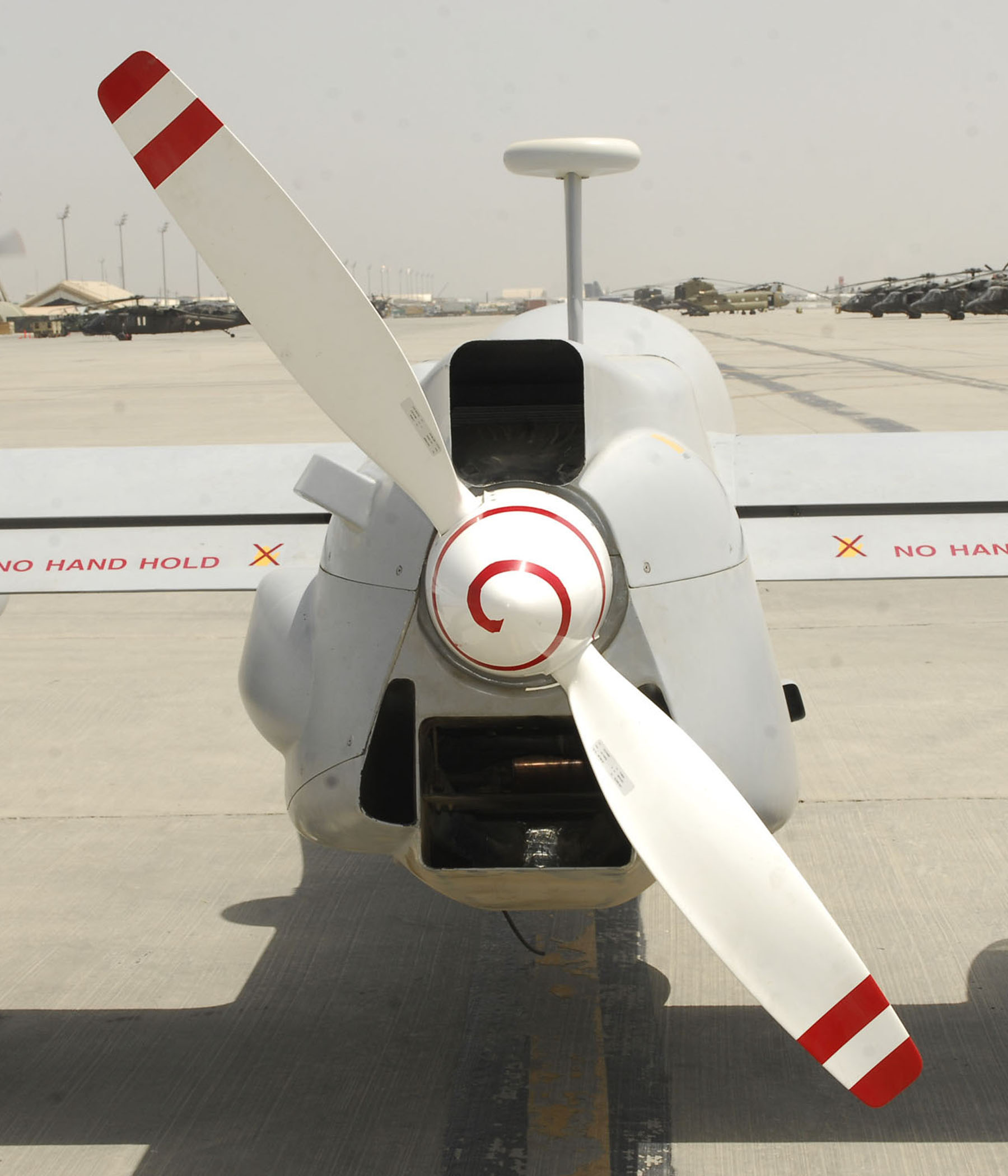
Rear of the body

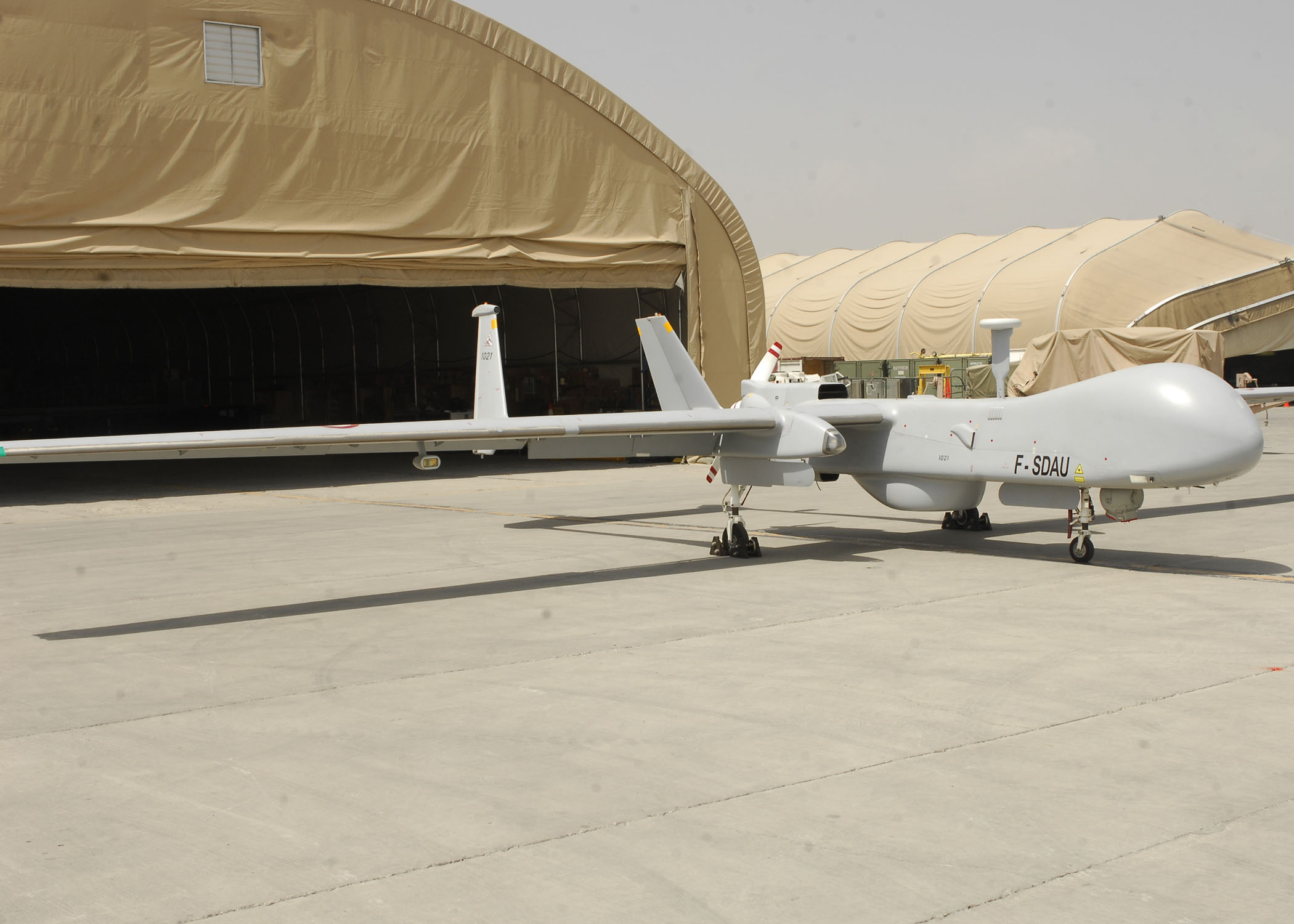
Side view, with top radar antenna and bottom sensor sphere well visible

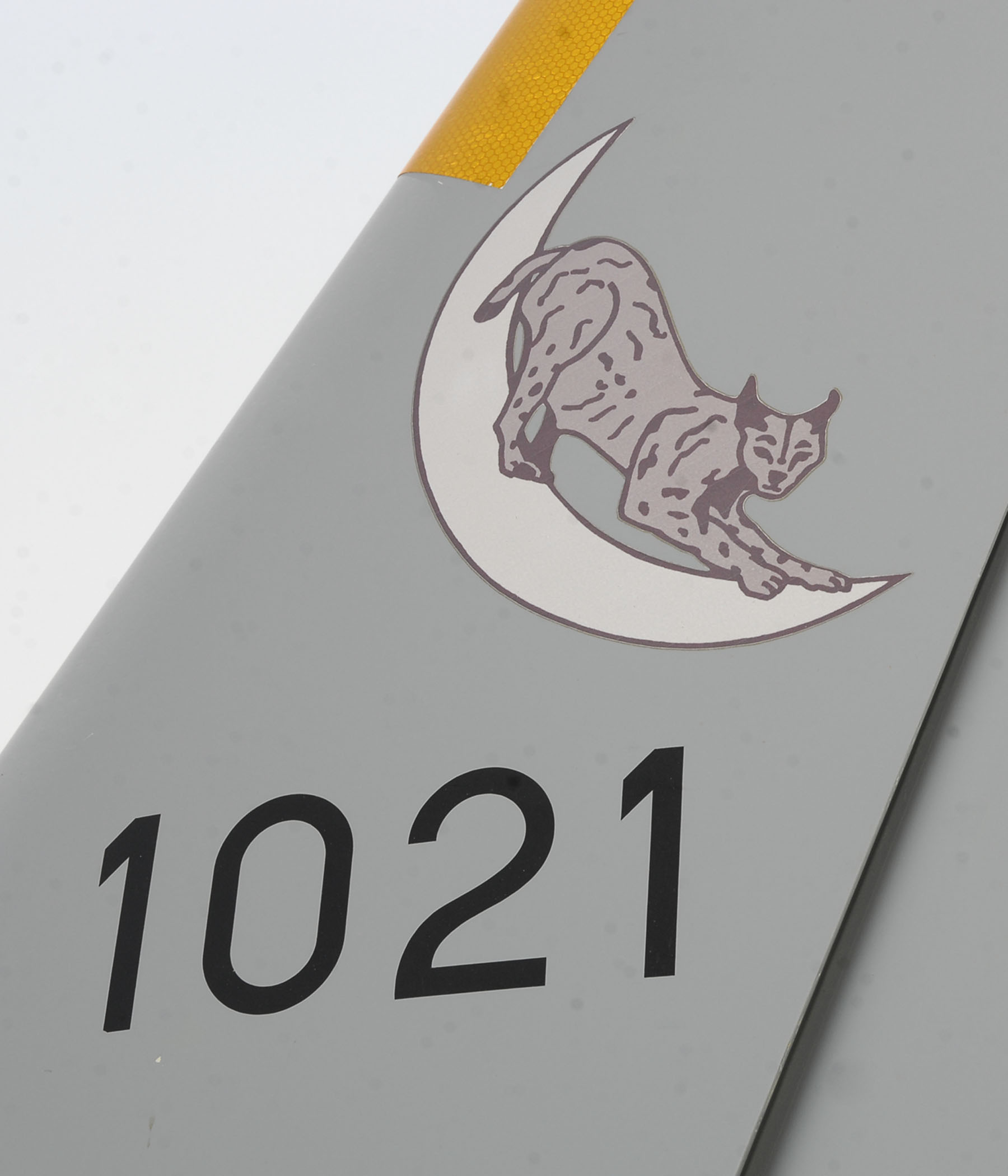
Tail of Vehicle 1021 F-SDAU with the insignia of the unit

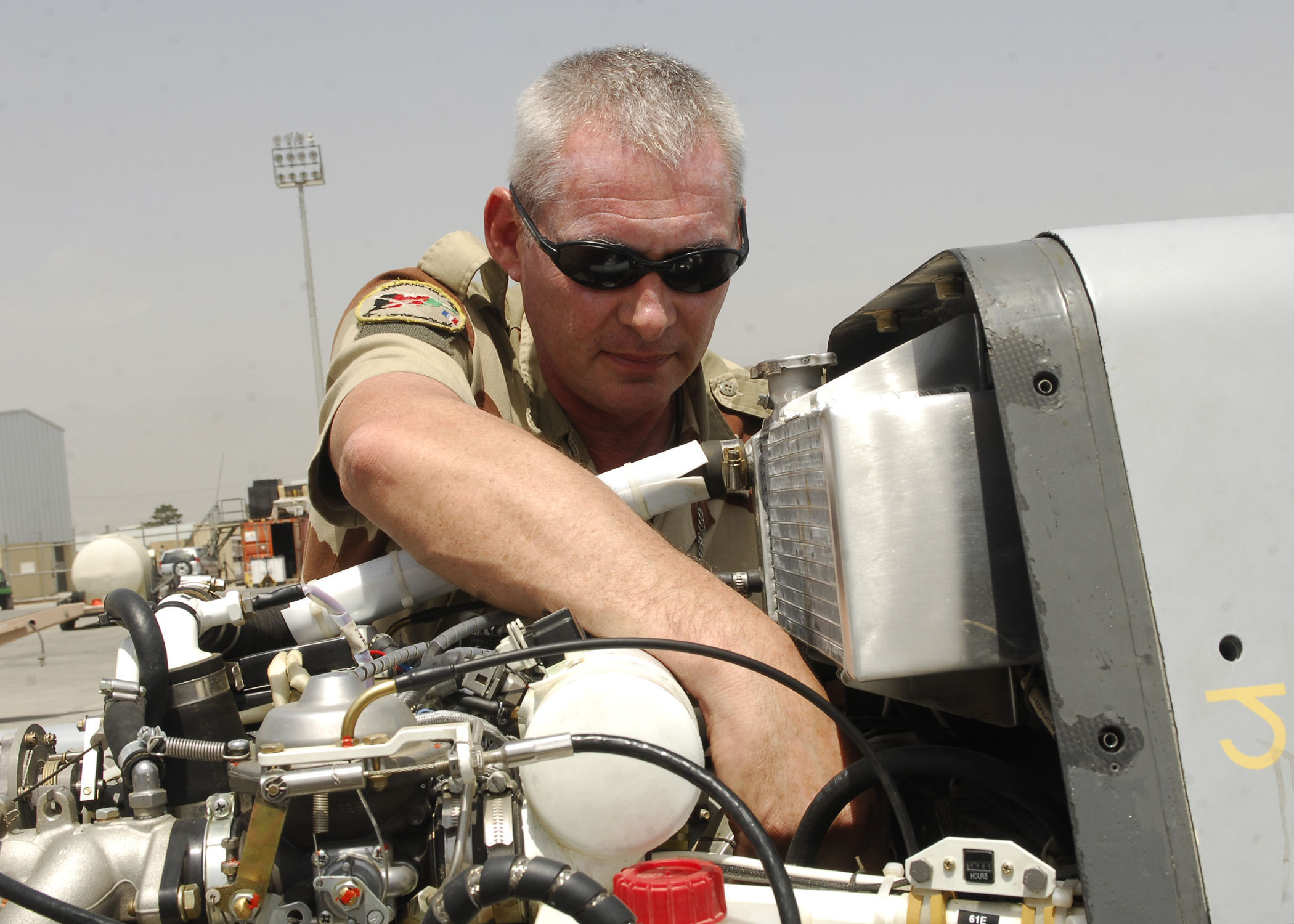
View of the engine

=== Control station ===
The control station is composed of four modules, numbered M1 through M4:

- M1 is the mission preparation station. It is based on a Mirage 2000 briefing station.
- M2 is the command and control unit, used mostly during take-off and landing. Most of the mission is automated.
- M3 is the data collection unit, receiving information through satellite communication
- M4 is the military intelligence centre.

A line-of-sight link allows for direct communication up to 150 to 200 kilometres away. Longer ranges utilise a directional antenna and geostationary satellites. The Very High Frequency and Ultra high frequency communication relay provides for links to ground units and air traffic control.

== Operational history ==
In 2007, the Harfang was deployed in Lourdes to provide security for Pope Benedict XVI.

In February 2009, the three Harfangs were sent to Afghanistan and deployed at Bagram Airfield, under Lieutenant-colonel Cyril Carcy. In late March or early April, drone number F-SDAY was damaged when it crashed due to freezing, and possibly to human or software error. Purchase of a fourth vehicle to replace F-SDAY is under consideration, while it is being repaired and redeployed in France for training.

In August 2011, Harfangs were deployed in the Libyan conflict.

France intends to replace the Harfang by 2014 with MQ-9 Reaper UAVs ordered in 2013.

On 5–6 June 2013, Harfang UAVs carried out their hundredth sortie during Operation Serval in Mali. Deployed since 17 January, Harfangs flew 1,600 hours during the day and night. From January 2013 to September 2013, the Harfang flew 2,000 hours in support of French operations.

As of 2016, Harfang drones were being used for homeland security missions in mainland France.

In early 2018, the French Air Force retired all of its Harfangs. In 2020, the three UAVs were delivered to Morocco, which had bought them in 2014 for $48 million.

== Variants ==
- Eagle 0 : prototype, first flight in 1998.
- Eagle 1 : first production versions, first flight on 2 June 2003 in Israel.
- Eagle MPR : naval version of Eagle 1.
- Eagle 2 : larger version of Eagle 1 with a Pratt & Whitney PT6 turbopropeller.

== Specifications ==

Data from

General characteristics

- Length: 9.3 m (30 ft 6 in)
- Wingspan: 16.6 m (54 ft 6 in)
- Empty weight: 657 kg (1,448 lb)
- Max takeoff weight: 1,250 kg (2,756 lb)
- Powerplant: 1 × Rotax 914F 4-cylinder turbo-charged four-stroke horizontally-opposed piston engine with air-cooled cylinders and liquid-cooled cylinder heads., 86 kW (115 hp)
- Propellers: 2-bladed constant-speed pusher propeller

Performance

- Range: 1,000 km (620 mi, 540 nmi)
- Service ceiling: 7,620 m (25,000 ft)

Avionics

- Optronic sensors
- SAR/MTI mobile target detection radar
- Line-of-sight and satellite communication systems
- Laser telemeter-designator

== See also ==
- List of unmanned aerial vehicles
