= Rostamabad, Rigan =

Rostamabad رستم اباد
- Village
- Location within Iran
- Coordinates: 28°36′11″N 59°05′18″E
- Country: Iran
- Province: Kerman
- County: Rigan
- Bakhsh: Central
- Rural District: Rigan

Population (2006)
  - Total: 516
- Time zone: UTC+3:30 (IRST)
  - Summer (DST): UTC+4:30 (IRDT)

Rostamabad (Persian: رستم اباد, also Romanized as Rostamābād; also known as Shūr Sharābād) is a village in Rigan Rural District, in the Central District of Rigan County, Kerman Province, Iran. At the 2006 census, its population was 516, in 107 families.
