= Rostamabad-e Rika =

Rostamabad-e Rika رستم ابادريكا
- Village
- Location within Iran
- Coordinates: 34°29′57″N 46°51′30″E
- Country: Iran
- Province: Kermanshah
- County: Kermanshah
- Bakhsh: Central
- Rural District: Miyan Darband

Population (2006)
  - Total: 80
- Time zone: UTC+3:30 (IRST)
  - Summer (DST): UTC+4:30 (IRDT)

Rostamabad-e Rika (Persian: رستم ابادريكا, also Romanized as Rostamābād-e Rīkā; also known as Tazehābād-e Rīkā) is a village in Miyan Darband Rural District, in the Central District of Kermanshah County, Kermanshah Province, Iran. At the 2006 census, its population was 80, in 21 families.
