= DRDO Rustom =

Type of aircraft

Rustom
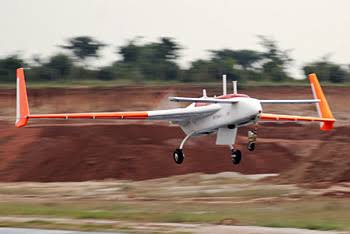
- ADE Rustom-1 UAV

General information
- Type: Unmanned aerial vehicle (UAV)
- National origin: India
- Designer: Aeronautical Development Establishment of DRDO
- Status: Rustom-1 UAV (Prototype flight testing); Rustom-H MALE UAV (Under development); TAPAS-BH-201 (Rustom-2) MALE UAV (Prototype flight testing)

History
- First flight: Rustom-1: 11 November 2009; TAPAS-BH-201: 15 November 2016
- Developed from: Rustom-1: Rutan Long-EZ

The DRDO Rustom (lit. 'Warrior') is a family of medium-altitude long-endurance (MALE) unmanned air vehicle (UAV) being developed by the Defence Research and Development Organisation (DRDO) for the three services, Indian Army, Indian Navy and the Indian Air Force, of the Indian Armed Forces. Rustom is derived from the NAL's LCRA (Light Canard Research Aircraft) developed by a team under the leadership of late Professor Rustom Damania in the 1980s. The UAV will have structural changes and a new engine.

The Rustom will replace/supplement the Heron UAVs in service with the Indian Armed Forces.

== Design and development ==
Rustom-1's basic design is derived from the NAL light canard research aircraft (LCRA). The aircraft has been named after Rustom Damania, a former professor of IISc, Bangalore who died in 2001. DRDO decided to name the UAV after him because it is derived from National Aerospace Laboratories' light canard research aircraft (LCRA) developed under Rustom Damania's leadership in the 1980s.

With the Rustom MALE UAV project, the Defence Research and Development Organisation (DRDO) intends to move away from traditional ways of developing products whereby laboratories under DRDO, like the Aeronautical Development Establishment (ADE), which is involved in this project, develop and finalize the product and transfer technology to a production agency.

DRDO will follow a practice of concurrent engineering where initial design efforts also take into consideration production issues, with the production agency participating in the development of the system right from the design stage. The agency will also follow up issues related to infrastructure and expertise for the product and its support, thereby overcoming time delays in crucial projects.

Rustom-1 has a wingspan of 7.9 m (26 ft) and weighs 720 kg (1,590 lb), will be launched by the conventional method and not the launcher as in the case of the DRDO Lakshya. Rustom will be able to see the enemy territory up to a distance of 250 km (160 mi) and carry a variety of cameras and radar for surveillance.

Rustom-H, built on a different design, is a Medium-Altitude Long-Endurance (MALE) Unmanned Aerial Vehicle (MALE UAV), a twin engine system designed to carry out surveillance and reconnaissance missions. Rustom H will have a payload capacity of 350 kg (770 lb).

The range of advanced technologies and systems include the following:

- Aerodynamic configurations, High aspect ratio wing, Composite airframe integrated with propulsion system, De-icing system for wings
- Highly reliable systems with built-in redundancy for flight critical systems like flight control and navigation, data links, power management, - and mission critical payload management system
- Digital Flight Control and Navigation System, Automatic Take off and Landing (ATOL)
- Digital communication technologies for realizing data links to control and operate the mission and relay UAVs
- Payloads with high resolution and precision stabilized platforms.

== Variants ==
Single-engine variants:

- Rustom-1: Tactical MALE UAV developed for technology demonstration purpose. Based on NAL's Light Canard Research Aircraft (LCRA). It has an empty weight of 800 kg (1,800 lb), range of 200 km (120 mi), endurance of 10 hours, and a maximum altitude of 20,000 ft (6,100 m).
- Archer: A further development of Rustom-1 designated as Short Range Unmanned Aerial Vehicle (SR-UAV). Manufactured by BEL It has range of 220 km (140 mi), endurance of 12 hours, and a maximum altitude of 22,000 ft (6,700 m).
- SRUAV-W: weaponized Archer variant.
- Archer-NG: Medium-Altitude Long-Endurance (MALE) UAV. It has payload capability of 300 kg and maximum altitude of 30,000 ft (9,100 m).

Twin-engine variants:

- Rustom-H: Medium-Altitude Long-Endurance (MALE) UAV with flight endurance of over 24 hours (completely different design from Rustom-1), higher range and service ceiling than Rustom-1.
- TAPAS-BH-201 (Rustom-2): A further development of Rustom-H model. TAPAS-BH-201 was commonly believed to be an Unmanned Combat Aerial Vehicle(UCAV) but at the press conference S Christopher, Director General of DRDO stated "Media reports are incorrect. Tapas is an UAV and not an UCAV".

== Current status ==
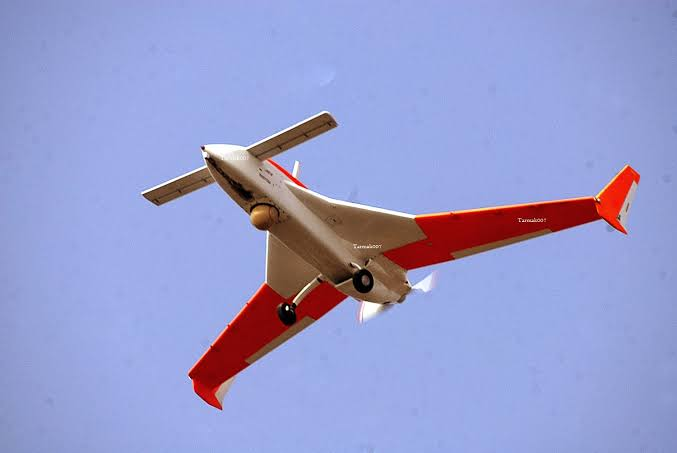
Rustom-1 during flight trails

The Indian government has allowed the development of the Rustom MALE UAV project in association with a production agency cum development partner (PADP). The ADE officials indicated that the requests for proposals (RFP) would shortly be issued to four vendors which are the Tata Power Strategic Engineering Division, Larsen & Toubro Limited, Godrej Aerospace Limited and Hindustan Aeronautics Limited-Bharat Electronics Limited (joint bid) who were chosen out of the 23 firms that responded.

Currently, negotiations are underway between these companies and the three Indian armed forces since the private majors are looking for support and commitment from them before they start executing any development and production plans. This is because the chosen PADP will also have a financial stake in the Rustom project. The Armed Forces would also be asked to take up a financial stake and the Indian government may have to guarantee that a specific number of Rustom UAVs will be bought. On 09 Nov 21 the project achieved the rare distinction of indigenously developing Automatic Take off and Landing (ATOL) using GAGAN SBAS. On 09 Mar 22 the programme achieved a double digit Endurance clocking 10:20hr surpassing the previous time of 08:05hr which was achieved in 2020.

=== Rustom-1 ===
The first flight of Rustom-I UAV took place on 16 November 2009 at the Taneja Aerospace Air Field near Hosur. The demonstration resulted in the prototype crashing to the ground. Stated by the DRDO, the taxiing and takeoff was exactly as planned. Due to misjudgment of altitude of the flight, the on-board engine was switched off through ground command which made the on-board thrust developed to go to zero.

Despite the mishap, the state-owned Defence Research and Development Organisation stated: "The flight proved the functioning of a number of systems such as aerodynamics, redundant flight control, engine and datalink, which go a long way towards the development of a complex UAV."

Rustom-1 UAV prototype

The second "maiden" flight took place on 15 Oct 2010. In this test flight, the UAV flew for 30 minutes at an altitude of 910 m (3,000 ft). The test was conducted in Hosur. The Indian army was impressed with Rustom-1 and will use it as a MALE UAV.

Rustom-1 made its 5th successful flight on morning of 12 November 2011, flying for 25 minutes at 700 m (2,300 ft) AGL at a speed 190 km/h (100 kn). It completed its 8th successful flight on 8 Dec 2011. It flew at an altitude of 1,800 m (6,000 ft) (max) and at a speed of 170 km/h (90 kn) (max) during its 30 minutes flight near Hosur, claims DRDO. The highlight of the flight was that Rustom-1 was test flown with the 'gimbal payload assembly carrying daylight TV & Infra-Red camera for the first time. Good quality pictures were received from the camera in gimbal payload assembly.

The 14th Successful Flight of Rustom-1 was reported on 8 May 2012, with the attainment of about 3,500 m (11,500 ft) above ground level and speed of above 140 km/h (87 mph) during 2 hours 10 minutes of operation.

As of 2024, the prototype has completed 65 flight tests.

=== TAPAS-BH-201 ===
DRDO carried out a successful test flight of TAPAS-BH-201 on 25 February 2018, at the Aeronautical Test Range (CATR) located in Chalakere, Chitradurga district. This was the first flight of the UAV in user configuration with higher power engine.

During its development trials Rustom 2 crashed near Jodichikkenahalli in Karnataka's Chitradurga district on 17 September 2019. No one was hurt. The UAV was being tested at Challakere Aeronautical Test Range, a DRDO outdoor testing facility. TAPAS-BH-201 completed satellite communication (SATCOM) mode trial and flew with long range electro-optical payload as of 16 August 2020.

On 16 December 2021, Rustom- II had reached an altitude of 25,000 feet and had achieved an endurance of 10 hours. In March 2022, TAPAS-BH-201 successfully demonstrated 28,000 ft and 18 hours of endurance. The Indian Armed Forces are impressed by the advance ground control and image exploitation system of Rustom-2.

On 27 June 2023, DRDO demonstrated 200th flight of Tapas to the tri-services team for the first time at ATR Chitradurga. Tapas was now ready for user evaluation trials.

=== Archer ===
The Archer is a further development of the previous Rustom-1 with a single engine in pusher configuration with features for Autonomous Take Off and Landing (ATOL) and EO/IR payload. The basic variant is developed for ISTAR operations. It also includes a weaponized variant which can fire Helina ATGM and laser-guided rocket along with integration of VSHORAD planned in future. In July 2022, Bharat Electronics Limited won the bid to produce 20 Limited Series Production (LSP) units. These will be delivered to the Indian Army and Indian Air Force for user trials. The first 4 units will be used for air-to-surface missile fire testing. After user trials, orders will be placed for more than 100 units.

Flight tests for the upgraded avionics architecture were conducted in April 2023. Trials of captive flight (using a training missile) were conducted in December 2023 in order to gather information for the evaluation of missile seekers. As of November 2023, it was reported that the first weaponized flight test of the UAV to be conducted by June 2024.

In February 2024, reports suggested that Archer could be ordered in large numbers by the Armed Forces and Paramilitary Forces if the missile integration trials are successful. The flight trials have been completed while weaponized trials are pending. During the weaponized trials, the UAV is to be armed with ATGM missiles to hit dummy targets.

=== Archer-NG ===
Archer-NG (next generation) is a weaponized Medium-Altitude Long-Endurance (MALE) UAV. The UAV utilises a single-engine, twin boom pusher configuration. The development of the variant was first reported in mid-February 2023. It was reported that the Aeronautical Development Establishment (ADE) is working to finalize the design of the airframe. The UAV has a maximum altitude of 30,000 ft (9,100 m), payload capacity of 300 kg (660 lb) and a range of 1,000 km (620 mi) with Line of Sight (LOS) and a range of 1,000 km (620 mi) with Beyond Line of Sight (BLOS). Weapon systems of the UAV includes Smart Anti-Airfield Weapon (SAAW) and Anti-Tank Guided Missile (ATGM) mounted on external hardpoints. An indigenous Ground Control Station can operate 6-7 UAVs. Roles of the aircraft includes ISTAR, artillery target acquisition and battlefield post-strike assessment as well as precision strikes. The development partner of ADE for the UAV is Bharat Electronics.

As of February 2023, the UAV was reported to undergo its first flight in June-July 2023.

As per updates in January 2025, the high-speed taxi trials have been completed while the first flight is expected in February, likely before the Aero India 2025 airshow at Yelehanka AFS. The Archer-NG is now expected to meet the targets of TAPAS-BH-201 as the latter failed to meet the same. The weapon types to be integrated are laser guided rockets, bombs, and loitering munitions having a range of 100 km. As per a report, the prototype is powered by an Austro Engine E4 powerplant inherited from the TAPAS-BH-201 program. However, two indigenous UAV engines of 180 hp (130 kW) and 220 hp (160 kW) is being developed by Vehicle Research and Development Establishment (VRDE).

The UAV is also designated as the Single Engine Twin Boom (SETB) variant of the TAPAS.

As of February 2025, with the taxi trials completed, the system is awaiting final certification for the first flight which was scheduled in March. Meanwhile, the weaponized variant would take three years for completion.

The first and second flight was conducted on 27 September and in November 2025, respectively, following clearance from DGAQA.

== Specifications ==
=== Rustom-1 and Rustom-H ===
Specifications of Rustom-1 and Rustom-H are as follows:

Data from Defstrat.com, idp.justthe80.com and stargazer2006.online.fr

General characteristics

- Capacity: 95 kg (209 lb) for Rustom-1 and 350 kg (770 lb) for Rustom-H
- Length: 5.12 m (16 ft 10 in) for Rustom-1 and 9.5 m (31.2 ft) for Rustom-H
- Wingspan: 7.9 m (25 ft 11 in) and 20.6 m (67.6 ft) for Rustom-1 & Rustom-H respectively
- Height: 2.4 m (7 ft 10 in) for Rustom-1
- Empty weight: 720 kg (1,587 lb) for Rustom-1 and 1,800 kg (4,000 lb) for Rustom-H
- Powerplant: 1 × Lycoming O-320 engines Four-cylinder air-cooled horizontally opposed engine, , 112 kW (150 hp) for Rustom-I
- Powerplant: 2 × NPO-Saturn 36MT engines wing-mounted turboprop, 73.55 kW (100 hp) each for Rustom-H

Performance

- Maximum speed: 150 km/h (93 mph, 81 kn) for Rustom-1 and 225 km/h (140 mph) for Rustom-H
- Cruise speed: 125–175 km/h (78–109 mph, 67–94 kn) for Rustom H
- Ferry range: 1,000 km (620 mi, 540 nmi) for Rustom-H
- Endurance: 12-15 hours (Rustom-1)

24-36 hours (Future solar powered variants)
>24 hr (Rustom 2)

- Service ceiling: 7,900 m (26,000 ft) for Rustom-1 and 10,668 m (35,000 ft) for Rustom-H
- Range:
  - Line of sight: 250 km (160 mi)
  - Relay Communication: 350 km (220 mi) for Rustom-H

=== Archer (SRUAV-W) ===
Specifications of Archer are as follows:

General characteristics

- Capacity: 200 kg (440 lb)
- Empty weight: 600 kg (1,323 lb)
- Fuel capacity: 150 kg (330 lb)

Performance

- Endurance: 12 hours
- Service ceiling: 6,700 m (22,000 ft)
- Range: 220 km (140 mi)

== See also ==
- Unmanned aerial vehicle

Related development

- DRDO Ghatak
- TAPAS-BH-201

Aircraft of comparable role, configuration, and era

- Shahed 129
- IAI Eitan
- IAI Heron
- EADS Harfang
- MQ-1 Predator
- TAI Anka

Related lists

- List of unmanned aerial vehicles
