= Rustem Akhmetzyanov =

Russian footballer

Personal information
- Full name: Rustem Gabdulbariyevich Akhmetzyanov
- Date of birth: 10 June 1978 (age 48)
- Place of birth: Kazan, Russian SFSR
- Height: 1.70 m (5 ft 7 in)
- Position: Midfielder

Youth career
- SK Uritskogo Kazan

Senior career*
| Years | Team | Apps | (Gls) |
| 1999 | FC Rubin Kazan | 1 | (0) |
| 2000–2007 | FC Alnas Almetyevsk | 202 | (15) |
| 2008–2011 | FC Sever Murmansk | 134 | (6) |
- * Club domestic league appearances and goals

Rustem Gabdulbariyevich Akhmetzyanov (Russian: Рустем Габдулбариевич Ахметзянов, Tatar: Рөстәм Габделбари улы Әхмәтҗанов, romanized: Röstäm Ğabdelbari ulı Äxmätcanov; born 10 June 1978) is a former Russian professional football player.

== Club career ==
He played in the Russian Football National League for FC Rubin Kazan in 1999.
