= Watchkeeper X =

Unmanned Aircraft System

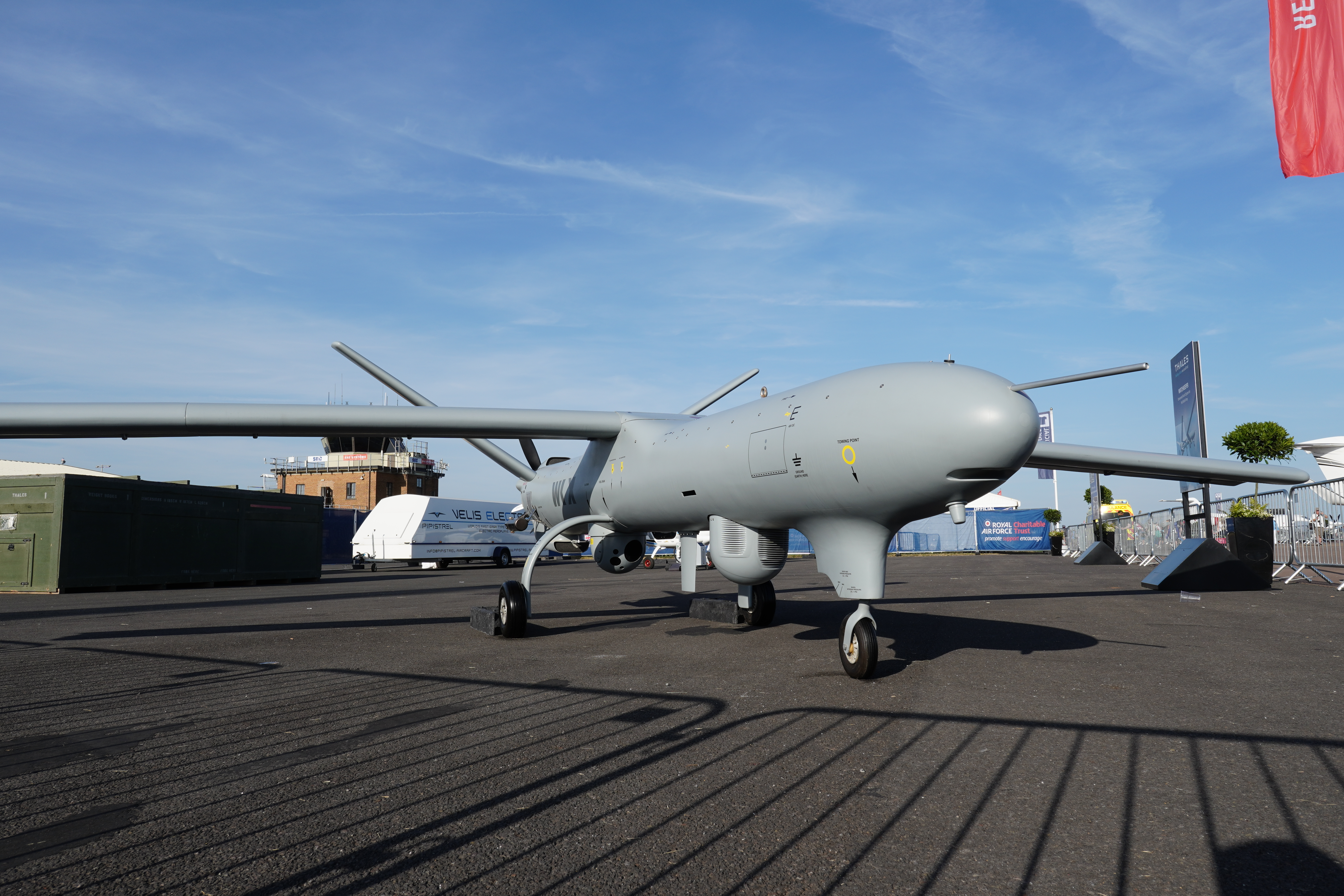
A Watchkeeper X (WK X) at Royal International Air Tattoo 2022

The Watchkeeper X is a high-performance, tactical, unmanned aircraft system developed by Thales and Elbit. It is the export variant of the Thales Watchkeeper WK450, derived from the Hermes 450. The drone was first unveiled in 2015 at the DSEI 2015 exhibition in London. Initially, the drone was offered to Poland.

== Design ==
The Watchkeeper X is similar to the WK450, however, it uses newer sensors, including a modernized and upgraded radar. It also has underwing hardpoints, capable of carrying external fuel tanks, pods, and lightweight weapons, like the Free Fall Light Multirole Missile (FF-LMM) precision-guided glide munition. The drone is built to the NATO STANAG 4671 airworthiness standard, and features a modular design that compiles Civil Aviation Authority and Military Aviation Authority standards. It also has de-icing and rough strip airfield capabilities, and can be transported by various vehicle types, enabling fast deployment in theaters without paved airstrips.

It features a fully autonomous mission control system that can provide independent control of all aspects. The UAS uses remote terminals for the transmission of data to a ground control station (GCS), which can support several aircraft in the air, sustaining 24/7 surveillance missions.

== History ==
In 2015, Thales announced the introduction of an export variant of its Watchkeeper UAV. The drone was offered to Poland, through a partnership between Thales and WB Electronics. The Watchkeeper version offered to Poland was weaponized in order to meet the Polish Gryf program requirements. In 2016, a drone with Polish markings and armed with 4 FF-LMM was presented at MSPO 2016.

Another potential client for the Watchkeeper X was France, where Thales identified more than 30 companies as potential suppliers in France. The potential partners included many small and medium-sized firms, one of which was Vitec, a specialist in video technology. The French UAS program did not require armament for the drones.

In 2020, the Romanian ministry of defense launched a program for the acquisition of 7 MALE drone systems, each consisting of 3 drones (in total 21 drones) and a ground control station. Three offers participated in the program: Hermes 450 offered by Elbit, Heron offered by Israel Aerospace Industries, and Watchkeeper X offered by U-TacS (UAS Tactical Systems, the joint venture of Elbit and Thales UK). In 2021, a memorandum for the production of the Watchkeeper was signed between U-TacS and Aerostar Bacău. During the event, an armed model of the drone was presented.

By August 2022, after a short suspension of the program, only Watchkeeper X remained in the competition. On 20 December 2022, the contract was signed for nearly 410 million US dollars. Of the 7 UAV systems, 6 are to be in land configuration and one in naval configuration. Elbit already manufactures component parts for its drones at two facilities in Bacău but without assembly. Following the contract, an assembly line will be opened in Romania that will transform the country into a regional hub. Starting with the first Watchkeeper X system, parts of the UAV and GCS, including electrical and mechanical components, will be produced in Romania. With the third system, all electrical and mechanical systems will be produced locally and maintenance work will also be provided. In June 2023, Elbit announced an approximately 180 million US dollar purchase order for the first 3 UAV systems, declaring that they would fulfill the order by June 2025. However, they later filed a force majeure declaration, claiming the war in the Gaza Strip prevented them from fulfilling the order by the contractual delivery date. At the same time, the drones are reported to have been seen being tested in the Fiq Airfield.

On 27 April 2026, Elbit announced the establishment of a new facility in Chitila, Romania dedicated to the production, testing and maintenance of unmanned aerial systems. On the same day, the first Watchkeeper XR drone intended for Romania's contract carried out its first flight.
