= Lightweight Multirole Missile =

Lightweight Multirole Missile (referred to as Martlet in Royal Navy service)
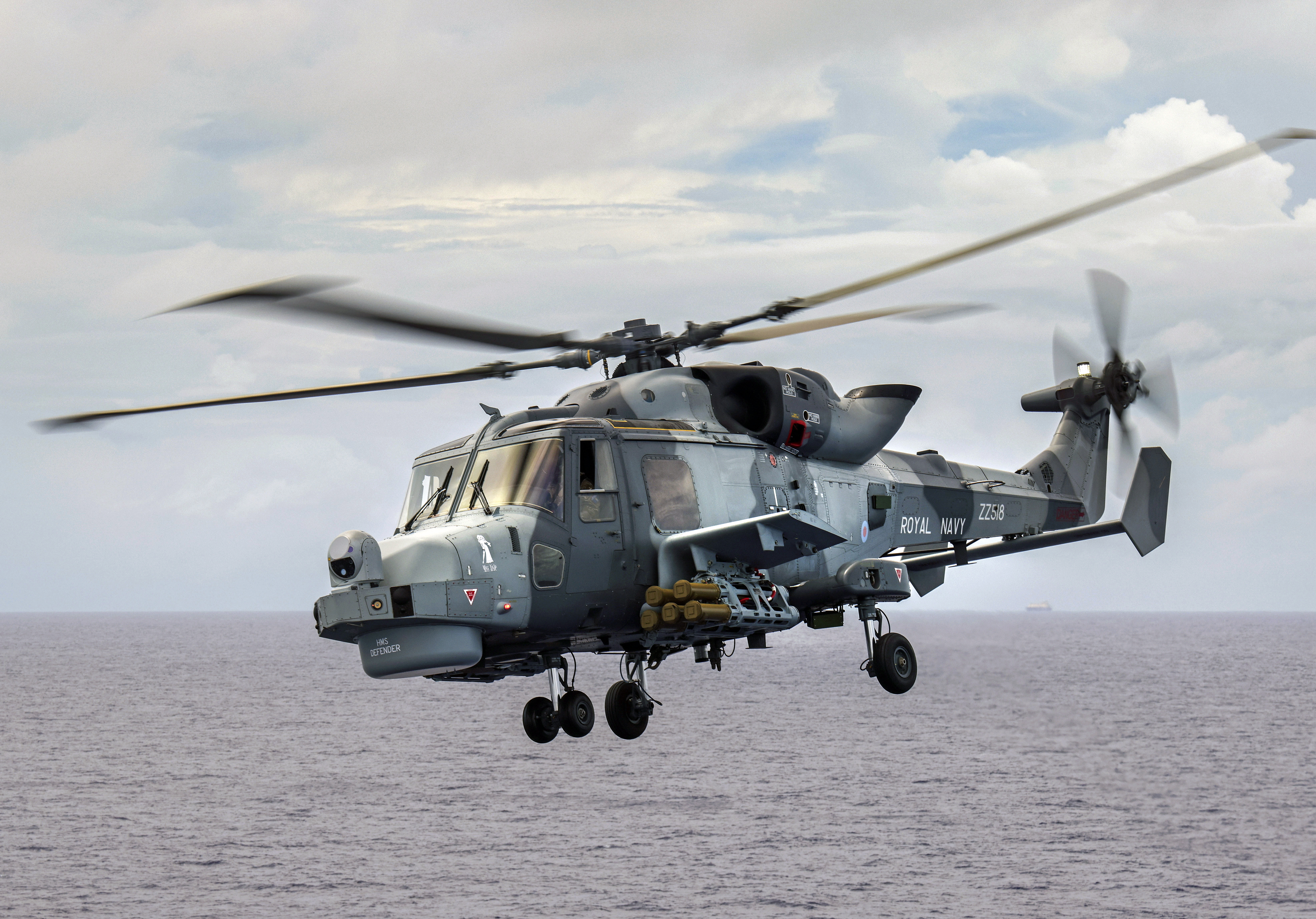
- A Royal Navy Wildcat helicopter equipped with Martlet missiles
- Type: Laser-guided battlefield missile (ASM, AAM, SAM and SSM)
- Place of origin: United Kingdom

Service history
- In service: 2021; full operating capability from October 2025
- Used by: Royal Navy; British Army; Royal Air Force Regiment; Royal Marines; Armed Forces of Ukraine
- Wars: Russo-Ukrainian War

Production history
- Manufacturer: Thales Air Defence

Specifications
- Mass: 13 kg (29 lb)
- Length: 1.3 m (4 ft 3 in)
- Diameter: 76 mm (3.0 in)
- Wingspan: 260 mm (10 in)
- Warhead: HE blast fragmentation, shaped charge
- Warhead weight: 3 kg (6.6 lb)
- Detonation mechanism: Laser, proximity (active)
- Propellant: 2-stage, solid propellant
- Operational range: >6 km (3.2 nmi; 3.7 mi)
- Maximum speed: >Mach 1.5 (510 m/s; 1,670 ft/s; 1,840 km/h)
- Guidance system: SAL+LBR (Mode A); IR Terminal homing (Mode B); IIR Terminal homing (Mode C); INS+GPS (Mode D)
- Launch platform: AgustaWestland AW159 Wildcat; Schiebel Camcopter S-100; BAE Fury; Thales Watchkeeper WK450; Jackal drone (UK) (under development)
- References: Janes

The Lightweight Multirole Missile (LMM) is a lightweight air-to-surface, air-to-air, surface-to-air, and surface-to-surface missile developed by Thales Air Defence for the United Kingdom. In Royal Navy service, the LMM is referred to as Martlet, a mythical bird from English heraldry that never roosts.

The LMM was developed from the Starburst surface-to-air missile to meet the UK's Future Air-to-Surface Guided Weapon (Light) requirement (supplemented by the heavier Future Anti-Surface Guided Weapon (Heavy) missile now known as Sea Venom) to provide Royal Navy AW159 Wildcat helicopters with the ability to engage smaller and manoeuvrable naval craft.

A glide variant of the LMM known as FreeFall LMM (FFLMM) (or Fury for the U.S. market) is designed as a lighter munition to equip drones and is currently slated to equip the British Army's Dispensing Rocket Payload for the GMLRS-ER and Precision Strike Missile (PrSM).

The Ministry of Defence (MoD) placed an initial order for 1,000 missiles with deliveries due to start in 2013. However, initial operating capability was considerably delayed and took place in 2021 with full operating capability achieved in 2025. In March 2026, the MoD said that in order to protect the UK's partners in the Gulf region, it would order more missiles, as well as provide them with training in the UK.

== Development ==
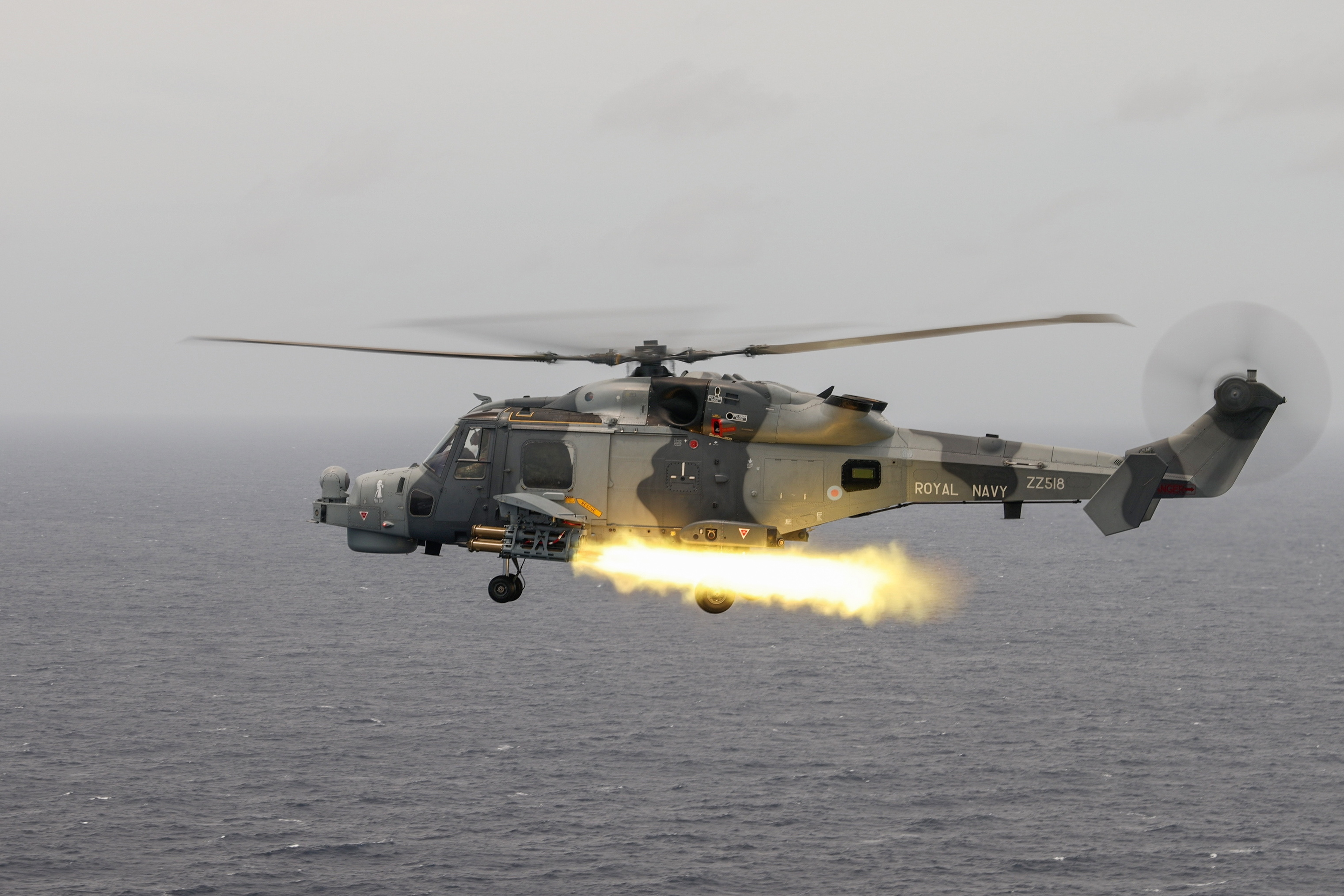
The first operational live firing of a Martlet missile by the Royal Navy in October 2021

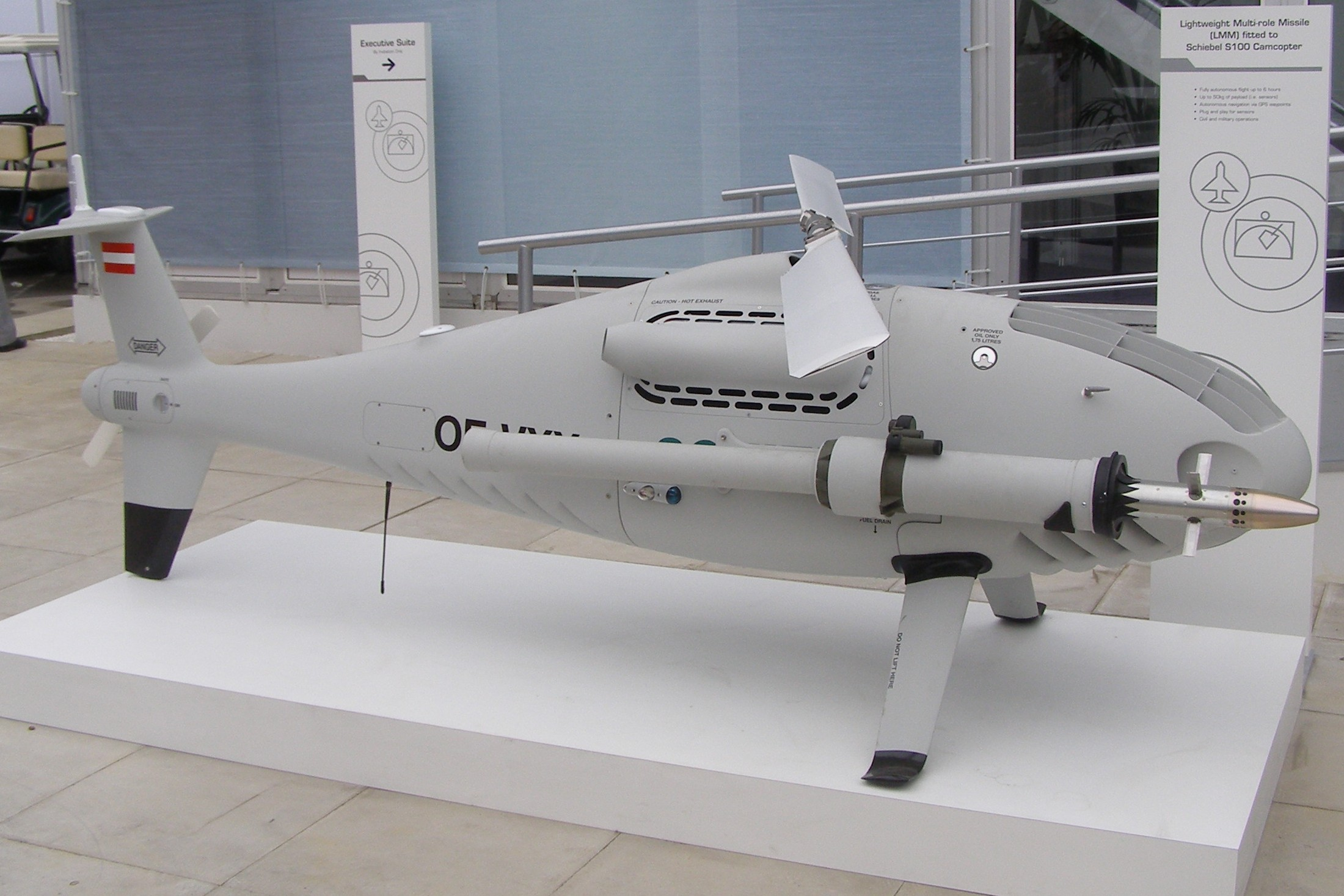
A Schiebel Camcopter S-100 UCAV fitted with an LMM missile

The Lightweight Multirole Missile was initially conceived as Thales' response to the MoD's FASGW(L) or Future Air-to-Surface Guided Weapon (Light) requirement. FASGW consisted of both a Heavy and Light variant. The Heavy requirement would become the Anglo-French developed Sea Venom (designed to replace the Sea Skua) as a helicopter-launched anti-ship weapon for use against fast attack craft (FACs), landing craft and larger vessels such as corvettes. The Light requirement was to be a new weapon optimised to defeat fast in-shore attack craft (FIACs) particularly in response to the force structure of the Iranian Navy.

Thales submitted a re-designed Starburst missile (the predecessor to Starstreak) which would retain a laser beam-riding guidance system to comply with the tight rules of engagement present in in-shore waters and ensuring continued effectiveness against low-reflectivity targets. It was designed to be launched from a variety of naval, air and land platforms against a wide range of targets.

Qualification testing and initial production commenced in late 2011, following an initial contract by the UK Ministry of Defence in April 2011. Thales has conducted successful guidance control firings, including a semi-active laser (SAL) version. The MoD contract was for the design, development, and commissioning of a laser beam rider version of LMM, together with production of an initial quantity of 1,000 missiles.

== Characteristics ==
The LMM weighs approximately 13 kilograms (29 lb) with a length of 1.3 metres (4 ft 3 in) and a diameter of 76 millimetres (3.0 in). The weapon is guided using a laser beam-riding system but Thales have proposed a variety of additional seekers including a semi-active laser, terminal infrared, and GPS/INS systems.

LMM can be operated from variety of platforms. Martlet has been integrated onto the Royal Navy's AgustaWestland AW159 Wildcat helicopters, which across two weapon wings and four total weapon stations can hold up to 20 missiles; alternatively a mixed load of 10 Martlets and 2 Sea Venoms can be carried, or a weapon wing can be removed to allow for a mounted gun on one side.

The British Army has integrated LMM on their current armoured (Stormer) and light role Starstreak ground-based air-defence batteries of 12 Regiment Royal Artillery and 106th (Yeomanry) Regiment Royal Artillery to supplement Starstreak.

Other platforms have also been trialled or conceptualised. In early 2019 HMS Sutherland tested a modified mounting for the 30 mm Automated Small Calibre Gun which incorporated a launcher for five Martlets, by firing four of them at a small speedboat target at the Aberporth range in Wales. The concept of mounting the missile alongside the 30 mm (1.181 in) Bushmaster cannon was tested just 5 months after the idea's conception. The intended role of the Martlet is to further extend the Type 23 frigate's capabilities against small, fast-moving targets beyond the current 30 mm, general purpose machine gun and Minigun options to provide a long-range "standoff" capability. As of 2019 it was not clear whether the Royal Navy intended to equip any more Type 23s with the system. A 2023 report suggested that the tests had not been deemed successful due to efflux management issues on the Type 23.

A number of other surface launch options have been conceived for the LMM such as standalone launchers, as well as concepts for LMM to be mounted to other gun systems such as the Thales 40 mm RAPIDfire. LMM, and in some cases FFLMM, have also been publicly tested by a variety of uncrewed aerial vehicles (UAVs) including a Schiebel Camcopter S-100, Flyby Technology's Jackal, and the Hydra 400.

Thales state that LMM's range, ground launched, is more than 6 kilometres (3.7 mi).

The Royal Navy version of the standard Martlet does not have a seeker but rides the sighting device laser beam to the target at ranges from 400 m (1,300 ft) to beyond 6 km (3.2 nmi; 3.7 mi). Janes report, as of 2025, a seeker is an option but the UK order does not include this option.

The cost of the basic missile, without launch system, has been estimated to be £50,000 by The Times in 2026, and between £59,000 and £71,000 by The Register in 2025.

== FFLMM/Fury ==
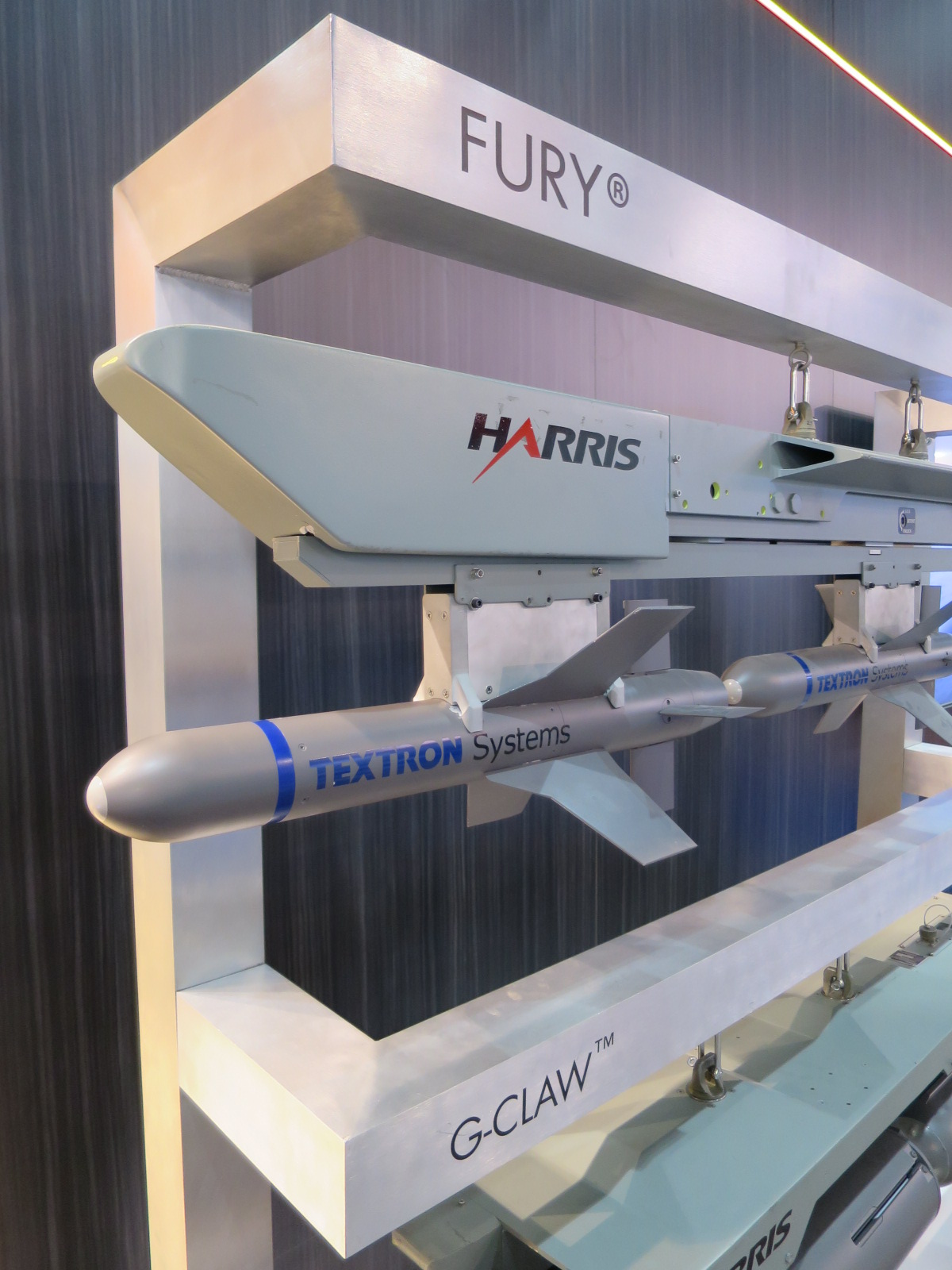
Textron Fury mockup at IDEX 2017

In July 2014, Thales unveiled a modification of the LMM that turns it into a glide bomb, called the FreeFall LMM (FFLMM). Thales partnered with Textron to market it as the Fury for the U.S. market, which provides a height-of-burst sensor and electronic safe-and-arm device. The weapon had been in development for 18 months and undergone initial test drops in August 2013. In comparison to the LMM, the FFLMM removes the rocket motor and associated components while keeping the body and control actuators, as well as adding an inertial navigation system (INS), GPS navigation, and semi-active laser (SAL) guidance in place of the beam-riding system, and four enlarged fins for increased lift.

The glide bomb is not intended to replace larger munitions, but be used as a smaller and cheaper alternative to self-propelled missiles, with three bombs able to fit on a single Hellfire missile rail. It is 70 cm (28 in) long, weighs 5.8 kg (13 lb), and uses a 2 kg (4.4 lb) dual-effect shaped charge and pre-fragmented blast warhead for use against armoured vehicles, small boats, and personnel, with an operational range of 4 km (2.5 mi) when launched at 10,000 ft (3,000 m). A potential role for the Fury could be to arm medium intelligence, surveillance and reconnaissance (ISR) UAVs like the RQ-7 Shadow to deal with fleeting or time-sensitive targets.

At DSEI 2023, it was shown that the British Army's Dispensing Rocket Payload being developed for the GMLRS-ER and PrSM will utilise a variant of FFLMM as a kinetic effector for use against armoured vehicles alongside Lockheed Martin UK's Outrider UAS for ISTAR.

== Operational history ==
In July 2019, the Air Defence Troop of 30 Commando Information Exploitation Group tested LMMs in a surface-to-air mode against Meggitt Banshee target drones.

In May 2021, the Royal Navy deployed Martlet missiles for the first time as part of UK Carrier Strike Group 21. The missiles were carried by Wildcat HMA2 helicopters, four of which were deployed as part of the strike group. The missiles were fired operationally for the first time in October 2021.

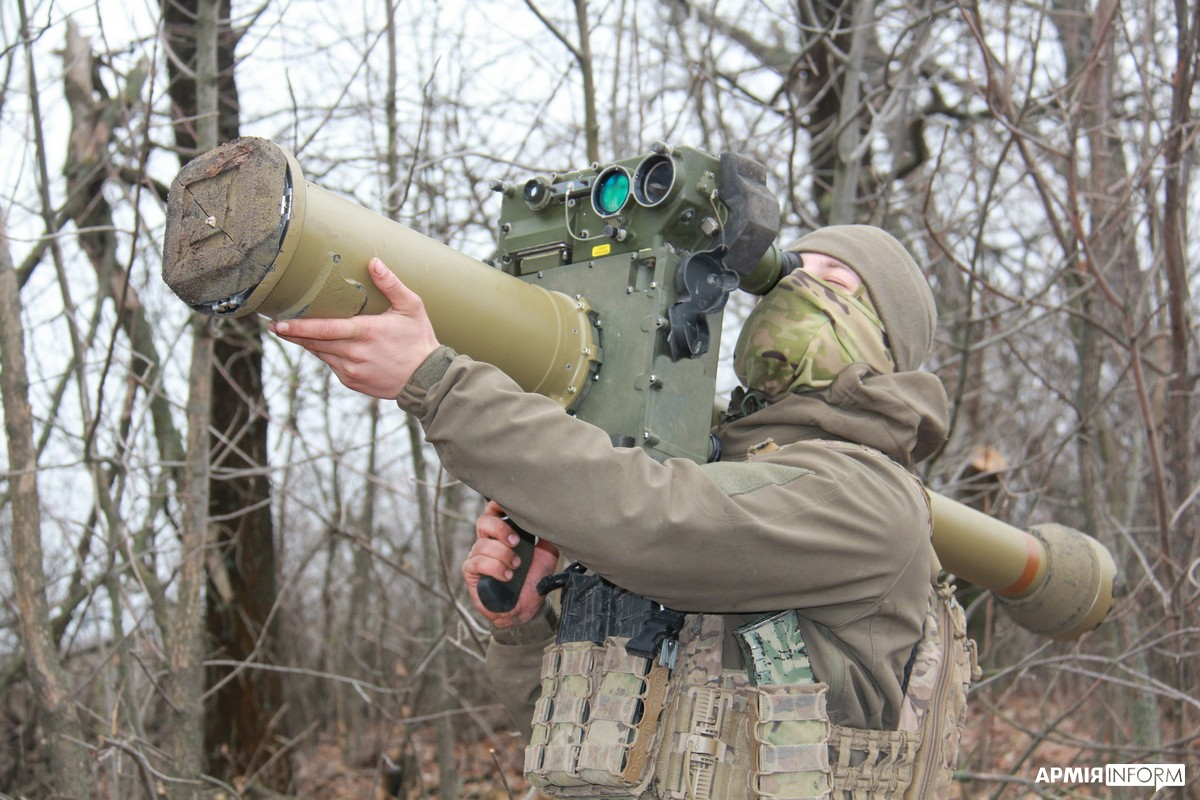
A Ukrainian soldier holding an LMM launcher

Following the 2022 Russian Invasion of Ukraine, the UK donated an unknown quantity of LMMs to the Ukrainian Armed Forces as part of a military aid package. They have been launched from MANPADS (man-portable air-defense system) shoulder launchers and also from the Alvis Stormer armoured air defence vehicle. In August 2024, a Ukrainian news source reported that the 95th Air Assault Brigade had shot down a Ka-52 "Alligator" attack helicopter using an LMM.

Martlet was used by a Royal Navy AW159 Wildcat helicopter to strike a retired US Navy frigate during a SINKEX (SINK EXercise) in September 2022 — the first time the missile had been used to strike a realistic target at sea, as opposed to purpose-built targets.

In October 2022, an LMM was successfully fired from Flyby Technology's Jackal drone (capable of carrying two missiles) during trials with the Royal Air Force.

In July 2023, the Royal Navy further trialled Martlet from Wildcat helicopters over the course of two weeks, during which the first air-to-air firings of Martlet took place against a Banshee drone.

In September 2023, Taiwan placed an order for 160 Jackal drones from Flyby Technology. However it is unclear if they intend to use LMM from the platform.

In November 2023, the British Army Warfighting Experiment (Urban) saw both the British Army and the Royal Air Force trialling a variety of technologies to exploit future urban combat; this included both LMM and FFLMM among other weapons (e.g. Brimstone) and payloads integrated onto the Hydra 400 and other UAVs.

In July 2024, it was reported that the British Army planned to order 12 URO VAMTAC vehicles and equip them with LMMs as a replacement for the six Alvis Stormer vehicles donated to Ukraine.

In July 2024, Britain ordered LMM missiles costing £167 million to replace the hundreds that were previously gifted to Ukraine. In September 2024, the UK pledged at a Ukraine Defense Contact Group meeting to send 650 newly manufactured LMM missiles to Ukraine at a cost of £162 million, with delivery starting in late 2024.

On 2 November 2024, the Royal Navy announced a successful trial with a Wildcat helicopter crew, which saw the first time a Wildcat had detected, tracked and engaged a drone without any outside assistance.

In March 2025, a further 5,000 LMM missiles for Ukraine were ordered at an initial cost of £1.16 billion, which averages £232,000 per missile system, with a potential further £500 million for additional work with a Ukrainian industry partner to manufacture launchers and command and control vehicles. This deal is a large part of a £1.6 billion missile export finance loan to Ukraine announced by Prime Minister Keir Starmer on 3 March 2025, which in turn is part of a £3.5 billion of export finance for Ukraine to acquire UK military equipment. The Ukrainian Ministry of Defence was later reported to have stated that this order would deliver 5,350 LMMs with launch systems based on the RapidRanger vehicle over five years.

Full combat readiness was announced in October 2025.

An order, worth £350 million ($468 million), was placed on 9 October 2025 for the Indian Army via a government-to-government deal. The initial batches of the missile would be manufactured in Belfast. In late August 2026, an Inter-Governmental Agreement (IGA) for a larger supply of missiles from an Indian production facility was expected to be signed soon.

In March 2026, Martlet-armed Wildcat helicopters were sent to Cyprus following drone strikes on the British Akrotiri and Dhekelia bases to improve drone defence.

In March 2026, RAF Regiment gunners deployed with Rapid Sentry short range air defence systems to the Middle East. The system consists of Saab Giraffe 1X radars, electronic warfare nodes and LMM missiles. The Sun newspaper stated that the system had accounted for almost 50 drone intercepts made by the RAF over Iraq in 2026.

== Operators ==
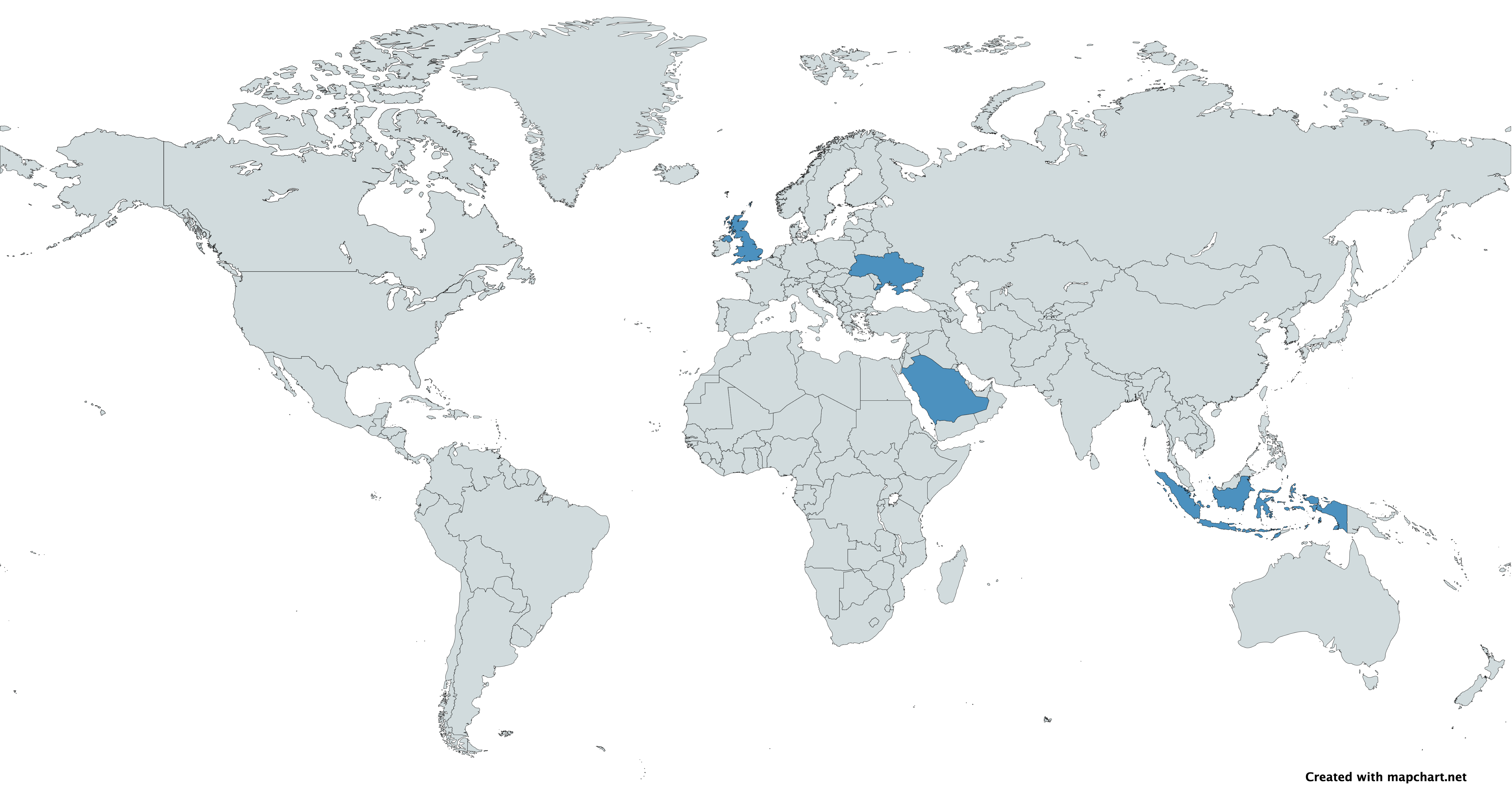
Map with LMM users in blue

=== Current operators ===
- Saudi Arabia - Fielded as part of the Shikra air defence system.
- United Kingdom - 1,000 missiles on order, deployed operationally with helicopters since May 2021; full operating capability from October 2025.
- Ukraine - Used in the surface-to-air role by Ukrainian forces during the Russo-Ukrainian War. 650 missiles were initially ordered by the UK MoD for Ukraine, followed by an additional order of 5,000 missiles in March 2025.
- Indonesia - Ordered in June 2014. Unknown numbers. Seen on exercise with Yonarhanud-14 (14th Air Defence Artillery Battalion) in March 2022.

=== Future operators ===
- India - An order, worth $468 million, was placed on 9 October 2025 and is to be manufactured in Belfast.
- Taiwan - Purchased 160 LMM-capable Jackal drones in September 2023.

=== Potential operators ===
- Portugal - To be purchased alongside Starstreak missiles for use by the URO VAMTAC Rapid Ranger system, as part of a wider air defense modernisation program.

== See also ==
- Sea Venom (missile) – (United Kingdom): formerly known as FASGW(H)
- CRV7-PG – (Canada)
- Hermes (missile) – (Russia)
- Precision guided derivatives of Hydra 70 rocket – (United States)
- Roketsan Cirit – (Turkey)
- List of missiles
