= HCUAV =

Hellenic Civil Unmanned Air Vehicle HCUAV

General information
- Type: Surveillance and Reconnaissance
- National origin: Greece
- Designer: Consortium: LFMT; LRA; CSL; Spacesonic Ltd.; Intracom Defence; MLS Innovation
- Status: Prototype
- Number built: 1

History
- First flight: 2016
- Developed into: DELAER RX-3

The Hellenic Civil Unmanned Aerial Vehicle (HCUAV) RX-1 is a Greek research project, which has currently produced a prototype of a Medium Altitude - Long Endurance (MALE) Unmanned Aerial Vehicle (UAV), with aim for the aircraft to enter production in the future and be utilised in civil and potentially, military operations.

The development started in 2013 and involved a consortium consisting of 6 partners, among them three University research groups including the Laboratory of Fluid Mechanics and Turbomachinery (LFMT) of the Department of Mechanical Engineering or the Aristotle University of Thessaloniki (AUTH), the CSL and the Laboratory of Robotics and Automation (LRA), as well as three private companies including MLS Innovation Ltd, Spacesonic Ltd and Intracom Defense Electronics (IDE). It is coordinated by the LFMT at the AUTH. The chief engineer of the project is AUTH professor Dr Kyriakos Yakinthos.

== Development ==
The primary project goal was to design and construct a low-cost, high-performance civil UAV, appropriately equipped, for long day and night surveillance and patrol operations, such as maritime monitoring, border protection and forest region surveillance.

The HCUAV RX-1 prototype was designed, developed and built as a small to medium-sized MALE-UAV with main objectives surveillance and data gathering for civil protection authorities, making its first and successful flight 36 months after the initiation of the project. The maiden flight took place in 2016, and lasted approximately 15 minutes. Several test flights followed, in order to validate and test different project parameters and objectives. The aircraft's maximum endurance was 11 hours.

== LOTUS ==
In November 2020, Intracom Defense Electronics (IDE) was placed head of the consortium that now also included other Greek and European companies from Cyprus, Spain and the Netherlands, for the design and construction of stealth swarm drones, codenamed Project LOTUS (Low Observable Tactical Unmanned System), based on the RX-3 prototype with ISR as its primary mission. It was noted that two types of drones will be built as part of Project Lotus. The first will be the "mothership", a large drone incorporating the RX-3 design characteristics, to be designed by the AUTH. The rest will be smaller swarm drones built in large numbers, linked to, and supported by the mothership. These endogenous aircraft could be used in border and maritime patrol missions, high value target reconnaissance and surveillance, while utilising data-fusion technologies to cooperate with the Hellenic Air force future 4.5 and 5th generation fighters. According to IDE, the Air Force could completely cover its operational needs within a 5-year plan.

== Specifications ==
Data from research paper.

=== General characteristics ===
- Wingspan: 6.4 m
- Length: 4.035 m
- Max. takeoff weight: 185 kg
- Payload weight: 35 kg
- Fuel capacity: 55 kg

=== Performance ===
- Endurance: 10-11 hrs
- Range: >150 km
- Cruising speed: 160 km/h
- Loiter speed: 140 km/h
- Maximum speed: 190 km/h
- Stall speed: 70 km/h
- Operational altitude: 2 km
