= ParcAberporth =

Technology park in Ceredigion, Wales

ParcAberporth is a technology park created on what was Royal Air Force (RAF) station Aberporth, near the village of that name in the county of Ceredigion, Wales, which is now Aberporth Airport. The station was one of two local sites that had been used as a site for a missile range that stretched out for some miles into the nearby Cardigan Bay. This Danger Area still exists and is known as Danger Area D201. Parc Aberporth is the UK's purpose-built testing site for unmanned aircraft. The Parc Aberporth centre was specially developed to test and trial unmanned aircraft, for both military and civilian use.

== History ==
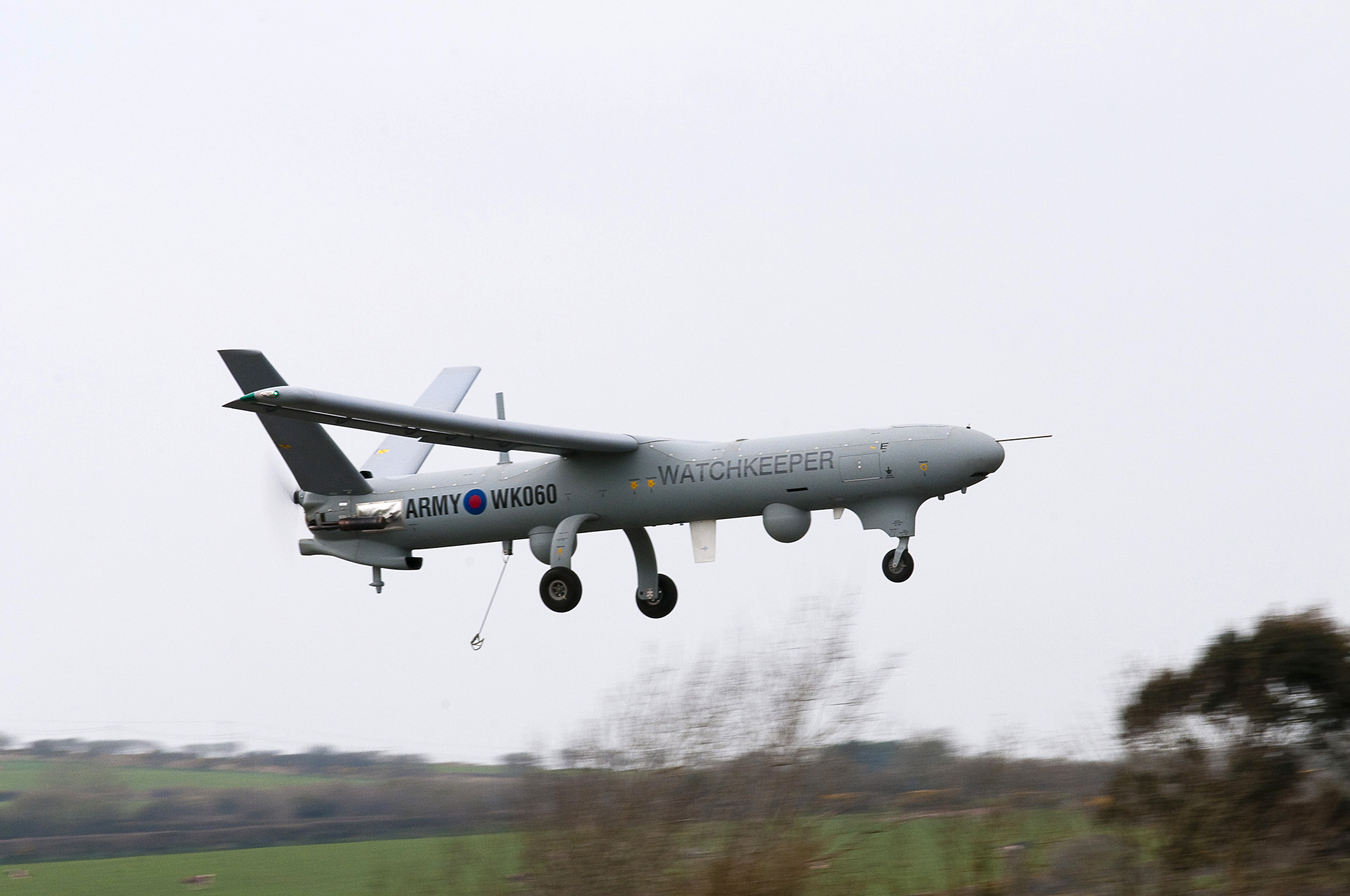
Thales Watchkeeper WK450 first flight in the UK, took off from ParcAberporth on 15th April 2010

In 1940, Ministry of Supply's Projectile Development Establishment at Fort Halstead became vulnerable to enemy action and Germans knew about the rocket development there, so the organization was evacuated to RAE Aberporth.

Aberporth Rocket Projectile Establishment began operation on the site in 1941 during the Second World War. It remained the principal UK live firing testing site for surface-to-air missile development for all branches of the UK military, in addition to the use of other rocket test sites such as Woomera in Australia, and High Down, Isle of Wight and at Spadeadam in Cumbria - the largest RAF base in the UK. It is currently the only site in the UK licensed to fly unmanned aerial vehicles (drones) in the UK. Since the RAF left, the testing facilities at nearby Parcllyn, are operated by QinetiQ, and the old RAF camp at Blaenannerch (now recreated as ParcAberporth) is owned by the Welsh Assembly Government. Next to ParcAberporth is West Wales Airport and is owned by businessman Ray Mann, who operates West Wales Airport.

ParcAberporth was created by the Welsh Development Agency, (which in 2006, merged in to the Welsh Government) to utilise the facilities and skills in the area. It has been focused as an operational test and evaluation centre for Unmanned aerial vehicles (UAVs). One of the main difficulties in getting a wider acceptance of UAVs in civilian and commercial use has been integrating unmanned flights with existing aviation. Work at ParcAberporth and West Wales Airport has been possible as a 6-nautical-mile (11 km) radius around the airfield has been designated Restricted airspace - Temporary (RA(T)) up to 5,000 feet (1,500 m) allowing UAVs to operate without special dispensation.

Since 2004, ParcAberporth is the site for an annual event of exhibition and conference devoted to the UAV industry.

In October 2005, ParcAberporth was inaugurated as a flight testing facility for unmanned aircraft, with a test flight of an Elbit Hermes 450, as part of the British Army Thales Watchkeeper WK450 program. On Wednesday 14 April 2010, Watchkeeper's first UK flight took place from ParcAberporth.

== UAV crashes ==
In 2009 a Selex Falco UAV crashed on the site. It was under control of a pilot at the site and landed within the perimeter.

During the development of the Watchkeeper program, 5 units crashed and inquiries were held. Two Watchkeepers crashed on flight trials over Cardigan Bay in February and March 2017, resulting in the grounding of all Watchkeepers for four months. In June 2018 a Watchkeeper crashed on land near the trials base at ParcAberporth, increasing the number of Watchkeepers lost in crashes to five.

== See also ==
- Clausen Rolling Platform
