= 74 Battery (The Battle Axe Company) Royal Artillery =

British Army artillery battery

- Active: Acts of Union 1800 - Present Day
- Country: United Kingdom
- Allegiance: United Kingdom
- Branch: British Army
- Type: Royal Artillery
- Role: Unmanned Aerial Vehicle
- Part of: 47th Regiment Royal Artillery
- Garrison/HQ: Larkhill
- Nickname: The Battle Axe Company
- Patron: St Barbara
- Motto: "Quo Fas Et Gloria Ducunt" (Where Right And Glory Lead)"Ubique" (Everywhere)
- Colors: The Battle Axe represents the Unit 'Colours' as such it is paraded for the Company Officers and on request to the Battle Axe Man by the Commander.
- Anniversaries: Battle Axe Day 24 February 1809 St Barbaras Day
- Equipment: Thales Watchkeeper WK450
- Battle honours: Battle Axe Brass Drum Moustache

74 Battery nicknamed "The Battle Axe" Company is one of the three equipment batteries in 47th Regiment Royal Artillery and is based in Horne Barracks, Larkhill. The battery has existed in various guises throughout its history and has operated a variety of different pieces of equipment as a member of various Royal Artillery units. In 2017 it transferred from the command of 1st Intelligence, Surveillance and Reconnaissance Brigade to 47th Regiment RA, part of Joint Helicopter Command, where it will operate the Thales Watchkeeper WK450 unmanned air system.

== History ==
Initially raised at Kilkenny on 1 April 1801 from the recently disbanded Royal Irish Artillery the 'Unit' formed the 7th Company of 7 Battalion was commanded by Captain Viney (late Major General Viney) and was subsequently billeted to Halifax, Nova Scotia during the Napoleonic Wars.

In 1808 the Halifax Brigade was requested to support a British amphibious operation to capture the French held island of Martinique during the West Indies Campaign 1804–10. Like her sister island Guadeloupe, the island of Martinique was of critical importance to the French warships based there, allowing considerable disruption to British trade ships and naval warships throughout the Caribbean. The threat posed by French naval vessels when combined with the potential for large scale operations in the region was sufficient to warrant a British assault to rest control of the Island from the French. In the autumn of 1808 the Admiralty authorised the release of a British squadron to remove the French threat on Martinique and the wider West Indies.

Formed from Irish Artillery at the Union, commanded by the late Major General (then Captain) Viney. February 1808 ordered to Halifax, Nova Scotia, December 1808 ordered on expedition for the purpose of taking Martinique. 7th Fusiliers, 8th Kings Own and 23rd Welsh Fusiliers, with this company under General Provost, arrived at Barbados on 8 December 1808; landed at Martinique on 30 January 1809. General Maitland with the Division of Army from West Indies, with Admiral Cochrane and some of the largest ships of war attacked the front; the Halifax Brigade, under General Provost, attacked the landside. On 2 February 1809, the French met the Halifax Brigade about halfway between the Bay where they landed and the town, but were driven back with considerable loss.

Batteries were erected and ammunition, etc., brought from the shipping about six miles distance. On 18 February a battery of six 24-pounders and 10-inch mortars was completed, manned by No. 7 Company of the 7th Battalion, commanded by Captain St. Clair, and opened fire the next day. The Royal Artillery of the other Division had a battery to the right. A continued and brisk cannonade of shot and shell was kept up by day and night. On 24 February a flag of truce was hoisted, and the garrison surrendered with honours of war to the number of 3,000 to 4,000 men.

The general officers now summoned the company Officers together to consult on what to bestow on the company as a reward of bravery and good conduct; they had in contemplation to give a 1-pounder French gun beautifully mounted, but the officers of the company and the commanding officer of the Royal Artillery knowing the company was to return to Halifax, and that a war was likely to take place with America, where they could not take the gun with them, they chose the axe and a brass drum; a brass eagle was fixed to the axe, which was carried by the tallest man in the company on all parades, shifting of quarters, etc.; the man who carried the axe had to wear a moustache.

The invasion of Martinique of 1809 was a successful British amphibious operation against the French West Indian island of Martinique that took place between 30 January and 24 February 1809 during the West Indies Campaign 1804–1810 of the Napoleonic Wars. Martinique, like nearby Guadeloupe, was a major threat to British trade in the Caribbean, providing a sheltered base from which privateers and French Navy warships could raid British shipping and disrupt the trade routes that maintained the British economy. The islands also provided a focus for larger scale French operations in the region and in the autumn of 1808, following the Spanish alliance with Britain, the Admiralty decided to order a British squadron to neutralise the threat, beginning with Martinique.

The British mustered an overwhelming force under Vice-Admiral Sir Alexander Cochrane and Lieutenant-General George Beckwith, who collected 29 ships and 10,000 men – almost four times the number of French regular forces garrisoning Martinique. Landing in force on both the southern and northern coasts of the island, British troops pushed inland, defeating French regulars in the central highlands and routing local militia units in the south of the island. By 9 February, the entire island was in British hands except Fort Desaix, a powerful position intended to protect the capital Fort-de-France, which had been bypassed during the British advance. In a siege lasting 15 days the fort was constantly bombarded, the French suffering 200 casualties before finally surrendering.

The capture of the island was a significant blow to French power in the region, eliminating an important naval base and denying safe harbours to French shipping in the region. The consequences of losing Martinique were so severe, that the French Navy sent a battle squadron to reinforce the garrison during the invasion. Arriving much too late to affect the outcome, these reinforcements were intercepted off the islands and scattered during the action of 14–17 April 1809: half the force failed to return to France. With Martinique defeated, British attention in the region turned against Guadeloupe, which was captured the following year.

74 Battery (The Battle Axe Company) Royal Artillery. was raised at Kilkenny on 1 April 1801 from men of the disbanded Royal Irish Artillery. A regiment described by Brigadere General James Pattison as "Diminutive Warriors", "Bare Breeched" and "Lower than Serpents" During the Napoleonic Wars it helped capture the Caribbean island of Martinique on 24 February 1809. The battle for Fort Desiax is said to be one that was won truly by Artillery alone. There was no breach of wall followed by rush of infantry; instead exploding shells replaced round shot. The battery had dragged their guns a wicked long 6 miles across the island beforehand and so was even more of a smashing for the French. Having distinguished itself the Force Commander wished to give a captured French gun to the company. The battery commander petitioned that the gun be replaced by something more easily carried and two French trophies captured at Martinique were given in its place. These trophies were a Brass Drum(lost over board on the way home after a particularly rowdy and drunken celebration) and a Battle Axe. The company has been known as Battle Axe Company Royal Artillery since, although the title was not officially recognised in Army Orders until 1926, 117 years later.

=== 19th century ===
From Martinique The Battle Axe Company, went to Canada and in 1813–1814 took part in the American War. The company came home in 1822 after 14 years in the West Indies and North America and was not to fight again until 1903–1904, when it was organized as a Camel Battery and helped to quell the disturbances in the Aden protectorate.

=== First World War ===
Soon after this the company was involved in the expansion of Coastal Artillery caused by the German Naval threat. It was reorganised as Medium Battery in 1927.

=== Second World War ===
In World War II the company served in North Africa, Crete and North West Europe. After the first desert campaign the company went to Greece whence it escaped to Crete after destroying all its guns. The company was soon in action again and helped to relieve Tobruk. On 1 June 1942 the company was in support of 150 Infantry Brigade west of Bir Hachem. After being cut off from the rest of 50th Division and having fired all its ammunition the acting brigadier ordered all organised resistance to cease. Once more the company destroyed its guns and 12 officers and 218 other ranks fell into the hands of the enemy.

The company was reformed late in 1943 and fought in France, Belgium, the Netherlands and Germany from D Day+1 to Victory in Europe Day.

=== Post-Second World War Operations ===
- Korean War
- Cyprus
- Belize
- Northern Ireland:
  - 1971 Belfast as Province reserve. Based on HMS Maidstone, Flax St Mill and Albert St Mill
    - 6 February 1971: Robert Curtis became the first British soldier to be killed in the troubles, when he was shot by the IRA on New Lodge Road, Belfast
  - 1973 Patrolling the borders and Guarding Long Kesh Detention Centre
  - 1974 Girdwood Park
  - 1976 Girdwood Park
- 1977 Belize
- 1982 Falklands War
- Northern Ireland:
  - 1987 The Maze
  - 1989 Omagh, county Tyrone
  - 1989 tour lengthened to provide protection for border construction work in Armagh
- 1991 First Gulf War

=== Equipment Change ===
- M107 175mm Self-Propelled Gun: 1967 to 1972, (32nd Heavy Regiment R.A.)
- 105mm Pack Howitzer: 1972 to 1978 (32nd Light Regiment R.A.)
- Striker/Swingfire and Blowpipe: 1978 to 1983, (32nd Guided Weapons Regiment R.A.)
- M107 175mm: 1985 to 1991,(32 Heavy Regiment R.A.)
- M110 8 inch: First Gulf War (32 Heavy Regiment R.A.)
- MLRS: 1991 to 2003,(32 Regiment R.A.)
- MLRS M31 AMMUNITION (GMLRS): 2003 to unknown,(39 Regiment R.A.)
- Thales Watchkeeper WK450: 2016 to present

=== The Battle Axe ===
Battle Axe Day

On 24 February, the battery celebrates the capture of the island of Martinique and the bestowing of its Battle Honour. It is not known when the Battle Axe was first trooped, but it seems fairly certain that the custom was established by the time the company came home in 1822. The Battle Axe has always been trooped for the company commander and for him alone. It has been suggested, though no written authority exists, that the reason for this is that it was only by the company Commander's importunity that the company obtained a Battle Axe instead of the conventional gun.

The tallest man in the company always carries the Battle Axe on parade. As a reminder of "les Moustaches" from whom the Battle Axe was taken, the bearer wears a moustache.
