= 47th Regiment Royal Artillery =

British Army artillery regiment

47 Regiment Royal Artillery
- Active: 1947 – present
- Allegiance: United Kingdom
- Branch: British Army
- Role: UAV
- Size: 5 Batteries; 457 personnel
- Part of: Joint Aviation Command
- Garrison/HQ: Horne Barracks, Larkhill, Wiltshire
- Nicknames: The Hampshire & Sussex Gunners
- Equipment: Thales Watchkeeper WK450

47 Regiment Royal Artillery is a regiment of the Royal Artillery in the British Army. It is equipped with the Thales Watchkeeper WK450. It is located at Horne Barracks, Larkhill in Wiltshire. It falls under command of Joint Aviation Command.

== History ==
The regiment was formed in 1947 when 4th Coast Training Regiment Royal Artillery was renamed 47 Coast Training Regiment Royal Artillery. It was reformed as 47 Guided Weapons Regiment Royal Artillery and equipped with the Corporal missile in 1957. In 1965 it was renamed 47 Light Regiment Royal Artillery and equipped with the 105mm Pack Howitzer and then deployed to Aden in 1967. It saw service in Northern Ireland during the Troubles in 1973 and 1975. In 1976 it became 47 Field Regiment Royal Artillery, initially equipped with the 105mm light gun, before moving on to the Abbott self-propelled gun in 1981. 21 Battery and elements of 43 Battery deployed to the South Atlantic during the Falklands War in 1982. 3 Battery, 31 Battery and elements of 21 Battery took part in the Gulf War in 1991. 21 Battery saw action in Bosnia in 1995 and elements of 31 Battery were deployed to Macedonia and to Kosovo in 1999. Between 2001 and 2014 elements of the Regiment were deployed on Operation Herrick in Helmand Province, Afghanistan.

In September 2019, the regiment changed from their Royal Artillery headdress to that of the aviation light blue beret.

== Role ==
The regiment is the sole operator of the Thales Watchkeeper WK450 UAS. By March 2025, the regiment's fleet of Watchkeeper drones will be retired from service. The Army is expected to replace the Watchkeeper with a more advanced drone system.

== Batteries ==
The Regiment currently comprises four equipment Batteries and one HQ Battery. The fourth equipment Battery (57 Battery) was added in 2019:

- 10 (Assaye) Battery Royal Artillery
- 31 (Headquarters) Battery Royal Artillery
- 43 Battery (Lloyd's Company) Royal Artillery
- 57 (Bhurtpore) Battery Royal Artillery
- 74 Battery (The Battle Axe Company) Royal Artillery

=== Previous Batteries ===
- 4 (Sphinx 1742–1993) Battery Royal Artillery
- 3 Battery Royal Artillery
- 21 (Gibraltar) Battery Royal Artillery
- 25/170 (Imjin) Battery Royal Artillery
