= Parc-llyn =

Village in Ceredigion, Wales

Coordinates: 52.132291°N 4.561232°W

- Location within Ceredigion
- OS grid reference: SN 2479 5131
  - Cardiff: 74.4 mi (119.7 km)
  - London: 194.2 mi (312.5 km)
- Community: Aberporth
- Principal area: Ceredigion
- Country: Wales
- Sovereign state: United Kingdom
- Post town: Cardigan
- Postcode district: SA43
- Police: Dyfed-Powys
- Fire: Mid and West Wales
- Ambulance: Welsh
- UK Parliament: Ceredigion Preseli
- Senedd Cymru – Welsh Parliament: Ceredigion

Parc-llyn (also known as Parcllyn) is a village in the community of Aberporth, Ceredigion, Wales, which is 74.4 miles (119.7 km) from Cardiff and 194.2 miles (312.5 km) from London. Parc-llyn is represented in the Senedd by Elin Jones (Plaid Cymru) and the Member of Parliament is Ben Lake (Plaid Cymru).

== See also ==
- List of localities in Wales by population
