= Thales Watchkeeper WK450 =

Unmanned aerial vehicle in the British Army

Watchkeeper
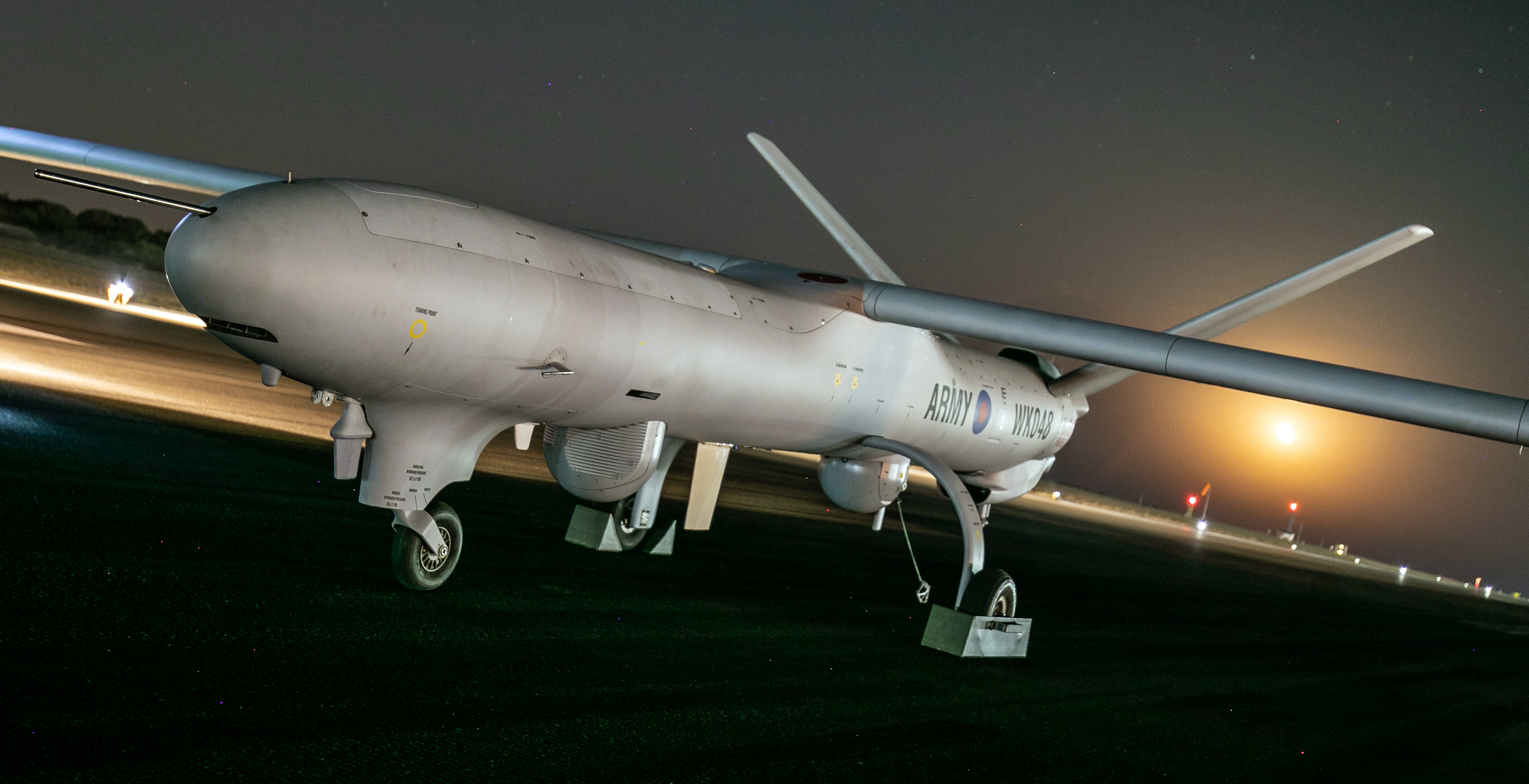
- A Watchkeeper based at RAF Akrotiri

General information
- Type: Unmanned surveillance and reconnaissance aerial vehicle
- National origin: United Kingdom; Israel
- Manufacturer: Thales Group; Elbit Systems
- Status: In Service
- Primary user: British Army
- Number built: 54

History
- Introduction date: 30 November 2018 (full operational capability)
- First flight: 14 April 2010
- Developed from: Elbit Hermes 450
- Variant: Watchkeeper X

The Thales Watchkeeper is an unmanned aerial vehicle (UAV) for intelligence, surveillance, target acquisition, and reconnaissance (ISTAR) used by the British Army. Originally, It was developed by UAV Tactical Systems (U-TacS), a joint venture of Elbit Systems UK and Thales UK, and is based on Elbit's Hermes 450, the production entity came under the full ownership of Elbit Systems in January 2026.

The Watchkeeper entered full service in 2019, and although previously slated for retirement in March 2025, significantly before its earlier planned out-of-service date of 2042, this has now been extended to an out-of-service date of March 2027.

== Overview ==
The Watchkeeper WK450 is based on the Elbit Hermes 450 UAV and is built in the UK by a joint venture company, UAV Tactical Systems (U-TacS), set up by the Israeli company Elbit Systems (51% ownership) and the Thales group. The Watchkeeper is 6.5 metres (21 ft) long, with a 10.9 metres (36 ft) wingspan. Its cruising speed is 77 knots (143 km/h), and it can operate at an altitude of 16,000 feet (4,900 m). It has a takeoff weight of 485 kilograms (1,069 lb), a typical endurance of 14 hours, a payload capacity of 150 kilograms (330 lb) and uses a rotary Wankel engine provided by UAV Engines Ltd, a wholly owned subsidiary of Elbit Systems, and target acquisition camera by another subsidiary, Instro. It can operate up to 150 kilometres (93 mi) from the Ground Control Station; multiple stations can be linked to extend the range. It was originally intended to enter service in June 2010, but years of delays, technical issues, hardware modifications, difficulties in training sufficient pilots and incidents means that it was not expected to be fully operational until late 2018.

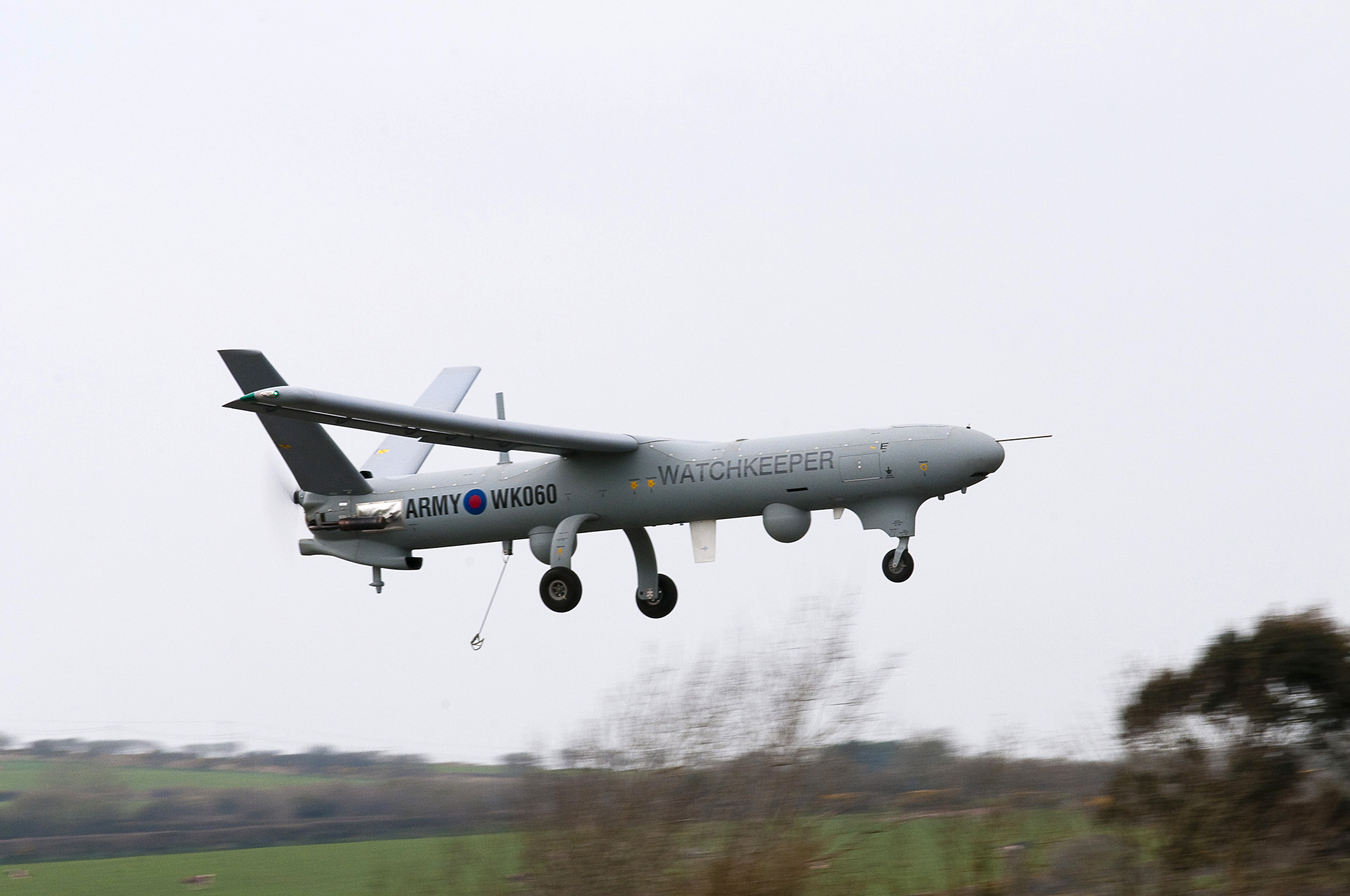
First flight on 14 April 2010

A prime difference between the Hermes 450 operated by the British Army and Watchkeeper was that the H450 was fitted only with an electro-optical/infrared sensor, while the WK450 has in addition a dual-mode synthetic aperture radar and ground moving target indication system that allows it to see through all weather conditions. The British Army was to receive 30 Watchkeepers and a further 24 due to go into store to be deployed as needed.

As of March 2018 the 47th Regiment Royal Artillery was the only unit operating the Watchkeeper. By August 2020, Watchkeeper had accumulated over 3,000 flying hours since the first flight in 2010.

In July 2022, Watchkeeper's out-of-service date was programmed to be 2042.

However, in November 2024 it was announced that entire Watchkeeper fleet would be retired by March 2025. This was largely due to much more modern, effective and cheaper drone technology being displayed in the Russo-Ukrainian War.

In October 2025, in a parliamentary response, it was announced that Watchkeeper would not be retired in 2025 but would be used through till March 2027.

== History ==
The program started originally in June 2000, when Racal Defence Electronics won a Ministry of Defence tender to conduct the 12 month assessment phase of the SENDER Tactical Unmanned Aerial Vehicle program. SENDER was defined as a Tactical UAV System, which will provide real-time battlefield intelligence to the British Army, to meet unit level Intelligence, surveillance, target acquisition, and reconnaissance requirements.

The next phase of the program was initiated to support an operational need, which was identified at the start of the War in Afghanistan, to provide the UK Armed Forces with all-weather day and night surveillance capability. In February 2003, the Ministry of Defence announced that two contenders reached the final stage of the tender, a group that includes Thales (at the time still operating under the name Racal Electronics) and Elbit Systems, and a second contender Northrop Grumman, after BAE Systems and Lockheed Martin were deselected (BAE subsequently entered negotiations to join forces with Northrop for the bid).

Thales and Elbit won the tender in July 2004, and proposed to build UAVs based on Elbit Systems' Hermes 180 and Hermes 450, which will be delivered to the British Army between 2006 and 2009. In August 2005 the program agreement was signed, at a cost of £700 million. The tender condition included a requirement to set up a local manufacturing facility for the program, therefore, at the end of 2005 a joint venture company was established, named "UAV Tactical Systems Ltd (U-TacS)", based in Leicester to manufacture the Watchkeeper. Additionally, in October 2005, a flight testing facility was inaugurated at ParcAberporth in West Wales, with a test flight of an Hermes 450.

In June 2007, the joint venture company UAV Tactical Systems, was awarded a $110 million contract to provide an urgent intelligence, surveillance, target acquisition and reconnaissance support capability for the British Army, in Iraq and Afghanistan, using Hermes 450 UAVs leased from Elbit systems (and not using any Watchkeeper WK450, that was still in development).

On 15 July 2007, the UK MoD revealed that 54 Watchkeepers would be delivered to the British Army at a cost of £800m. This figure includes construction of new basing facilities at Boscombe Down airfield, ground training facilities and simulators at the School of Artillery, ground control stations, development and testing of extensive aircraft modifications including automatic take-off and landing and the integration and provision of new sensors including radars.

In October 2008, Rosh Pina Airport in Israel was used for flight trials of the Watchkeeper, after Britain had objected to the trials being conducted at Fik Airfield, Elbit's test site, which is in the Golan Heights.

Watchkeeper's first UK flight took place on Wednesday 14 April 2010 from ParcAberporth in Wales, but due to numerous delays the delivery date slipped. By 2014 Watchkeeper had gained certification from the Military Aviation Authority, had its Release to Service granted was cleared for military flight training with the Royal Artillery, operating out of Boscombe Down in Wiltshire. In February 2014 the French Ministry of Defence indicated that the French Army might purchase the Watchkeeper WK450, but they instead selected the Sagem Patroller in 2016 for the tactical unmanned air vehicle requirement.

By December 2015 delivery to the British Army was progressing well, but there were difficulties in training sufficient pilots. As poor weather in Britain was limiting the time available to conduct flying training the decision was made to conduct future training on the tropical Ascension Island located in the Atlantic Ocean. Although there is hope that future modifications to the aircraft will enable it to fly in poor weather, the training on Ascension Island is set to continue for the foreseeable future. Enough pilots and ground crew are expected to be trained for full operational capability to be reached by early 2018.

Costs of the programme to March 2018 were £1.08 billion, more than £200 million above the original budget. The original order was for 54 Watchkeepers, though it has not been confirmed that more than 45 had been delivered at that date. A report by the Major Projects Authority, published in June 2015, revealed that the estimated cost of achieving full operational capability of the program is £1.2bn.

Watchkeeper achieved the Army's full operational capability 2 (FOC 2) milestone on 30 November 2018, though without formal release to service (RTS) certification, which would allow the trials facility to move from West Wales Airport, which has a nearby oversea trials area, to Boscombe Down. Full clearance to service was made in April 2019.

In June 2023, Defence minister James Cartlidge stated that the Watchkeeper program had cost £1.35 billion to date, including necessary airfield upgrades at Aberporth and Boscombe Down. By 2023, one in seven Watchkeepers had been lost, giving concerns about the cost-effectiveness of the Watchkeeper compared to smaller more modern UAVs.

In November 2024, Defence Secretary John Healey announced to the UK House of Commons that some military equipment, including the entire fleet of Watchkeeper WK450 Mk1 drones, would be retired earlier than planned to cut costs. At the time of the announcement only 11 of the 54 acquired were in military use, with the remainder in storage or used in tests; seven had been lost in accidents.

In January 2026, Elbit Systems announced the completion of the acquisition of Thales UK's remaining 49% stake in UAV Tactical Systems (U-TacS). This transaction concluded the long-standing joint venture between the two companies, with U-TacS becoming a wholly owned subsidiary of Elbit Systems UK.

=== Incidents ===
During the development of Watchkeeper, some units crashed in the UK, and inquiries were held.

Two Watchkeepers crashed on flight trials over Cardigan Bay in February and March 2017, resulting in the grounding of all Watchkeepers for four months. In June 2018 a Watchkeeper crashed on land near the trials base at West Wales Airport, increasing the number of Watchkeepers lost in crashes to five.

As of December 2020 units that had crashed in the UK were WK031 - 16 October 2014, WK006 - 2 November 2015, WK042 - 3 February 2017, WK043 - 24 March 2017, and WK050 - 13 June 2018. Links to the enquiries are available at the Army Watchkeeper Web page.

A Watchkeeper crashed in Cyprus in October 2020 during training. This was due to an avionics power failure and the air vehicle being unable to regain communication with the ground control system. Following the incident, WK044 operated as planned following the 'lost link procedure' to regain ground communication. This was unsuccessful, so the air vehicle attempted to land. Upon an attempted landing, a nose gear steering failure caused the air vehicle to steer off the runway. The incident resulted in the loss of WK044.

A Watchkeeper crashed near Cyprus in May 2022 during training. It experienced an engine failure and then automatically flew to its predetermined emergency recovery point in the Mediterranean sea off the coast of Cyprus. Its wreckage was recovered from the sea to begin investigation into the cause of the incident.

On 10 November 2022, a Watchkeeper WK036 crashed on an exercise in New Mexico, the eighth loss since 2014.

=== Deployment ===
On 29 September 2014, the MoD revealed that an undisclosed number of Watchkeepers had become fully operational and sent to Afghanistan. The aircraft were stationed at Camp Bastion to provide force protection for British troops and worked alongside Hermes 450s that it is derived from. Watchkeeper proved its use by successfully supporting a detachment of U.S. Marines using its Thales I-Master radar. It cued a Hermes 450 onto a target for continued tracking, which then passed the information on to a Royal Air Force MQ-9 Reaper to conduct an airstrike. Some 140 flights were conducted for 8 hours a day until operations ceased in mid-October 2014.

==== Border patrol ====
In September 2020, in support of the UK Border Force under Operation Deveran, the British Army used Watchkeeper to patrol the English Channel for potential illegal entrants into the UK. The operation was criticised as being of little practical value. Just 15 sorties, totalling 43 hours and 52 minutes, were flown in September 2020, and six sorties for 23 hours and 54 minutes were flown the following month. Chris Cole, director of Drone Wars UK, said "the use of military-grade drones at borders is the beginning of the use of drones that blur the boundaries between military and domestic policing".

=== Replacement ===
Project Corvus was initiated in April 2025 to replace Watchkeeper UAVs, with a budget of £156 million for five years of operation, planned to start in 2026.

One analyst writing for the Royal United Services Institute did question if medium-altitude long-endurance UAV (MALE) drones, like the Watchkeeper and its replacement, are survivable in the threat environment of contemporary conflicts, pointing to the lack of success of Ukraine's Bayraktar TB2 fleet and the loss of 15 US MQ-9 Reaper UAVs over Yemen.

In July 2026 the Tekever AR5 was chosen as the replacement. Under Project Corvus, up to £400 million was made available for AR5 procurement. An initial batch of 6 is planned, with up to 24 planned to be procured by 2029.

== See also ==
- Watchkeeper X
- Elbit Skylark
- Hermes 900
