= STANAG 4671 =

UAV airworthiness requirements

NATO STANAG 4671 is the NATO Standardized Agreement 4671 which is the Unmanned Aircraft Systems Airworthiness Requirements (USAR). It is intended to allow military Unmanned aircraft systems (UAS) to operate in other NATO members airspace.

Page 1 of edition 1 states:

If a National Certifying Authority states that a UAV System airworthiness is compliant with STANAG 4671 (and any appropriate national reservations), then, from an airworthiness perspective, that UAV System should have streamlined approval to fly in the airspace of other NATO countries, if those countries have also ratified this STANAG.

Edition 1 was promulgated in September 2009. Edition 2 was promulgated in February 2017.

Draft edition 3 was being commented on (e.g. by the aircraft industry) in Sept 2014, calling attention to slow progress and highlighting concerns. Edition 3 was promulgated in Apr 2019.

Since Edition 2 of STANAG 4671, the detailed engineering and airworthiness requirements have been published separately as AEP-4671. The STANAG now serves primarily as the high-level standardization agreement that references the AEP, rather than including the full technical specification within its text. STANAG 4671 Edition 3 refers to AEP-4671 Edition B for the detailed engineering requirements.

== Background ==
The task to initiate this standard resulted from a NATO meeting of the Flight In Non-Segregated Airspace (FINAS) Working Group, September 2004. There were no known international military standards for unmanned airworthiness. To prepare for the possible acquisition of a NATO-owned unmanned aerial vehicle (UAV), the level of airworthiness was essential so that industry could meet the alliance requirement.

At the March 2005 FINAS meeting, France offered their national standard developed by Direction Générale de L'armement (DGA) to be an initial basis for a NATO standard. The DGA document was titled “UAV System Airworthiness Requirements” a designation that France asked to be applied in NATO. This DGA standard was structured on the basis of EASA Certification Specification 23, CS-23 Normal, Utility, Aerobatic and Commuter Aeroplanes. The offer was accepted and the FINAS Chairman established a UAV System Airworthiness Requirements (USAR) Specialist Team (ST) to lead the production of document to establish guidelines for NATO UAV airworthiness. The French agreed to lead the ST.

The initial mandate of the ST was to recommend NATO-wide guidelines for UAV airworthiness to allow the cross-border operation of unmanned aerial vehicles (UAVs) in non-segregated airspace.

== Scope ==
It covers fixed-wing military UAVs from 150 kg to 20,000 kg, that do NOT need "for normal operation the presence of a pilot that directly controls the UAV using a control box (e.g., stick, rudder pedals, throttles, etc.)"

It covers all aspects of the UAV system including communication links and control centre.

It covers, e.g. ground handling characteristics, landing gear, UAV external 'position' lights, Command and control data link loss strategy, Emergency recovery capability, (including deliberate flight termination using explosives).

== UAV safety requirements ==
=== Sense and avoid ===
Page 7 states "It is recognized that ‘sense and avoid’ is a key enabling issue for UAV operations. The derivation and definition of ‘sense and avoid’ requirements is primarily an operational issue and hence outside the scope of USAR. However, once these requirements have been clarified, any system designed and installed to achieve these objectives is an item of installed equipment within a UAV System and hence falls under the airworthiness requirements of USAR."

== Ratifying countries ==
Ratifying countries are listed in the front of AEP-4671, Ed. B Ver. 1, found on the NATO Standardization Office web site. National reservations are also listed.

== Compliant UAVs ==
* Elbit Systems Hermes 900 "StarLiner"

== UAVs intended to be Compliant ==
- Elbit Hermes 900
- Eurodrone
- General Atomics MQ-9 Reaper#Certifiable Predator B
- Leonardo Falco Xplorer
- SAGEM Patroller
- Vestel karayel
- Watchkeeper X

== See also ==
- EuroHawk: would need much work to be compliant
