= Leonardo Falco Xplorer =

Type of UAV

Falco Xplorer
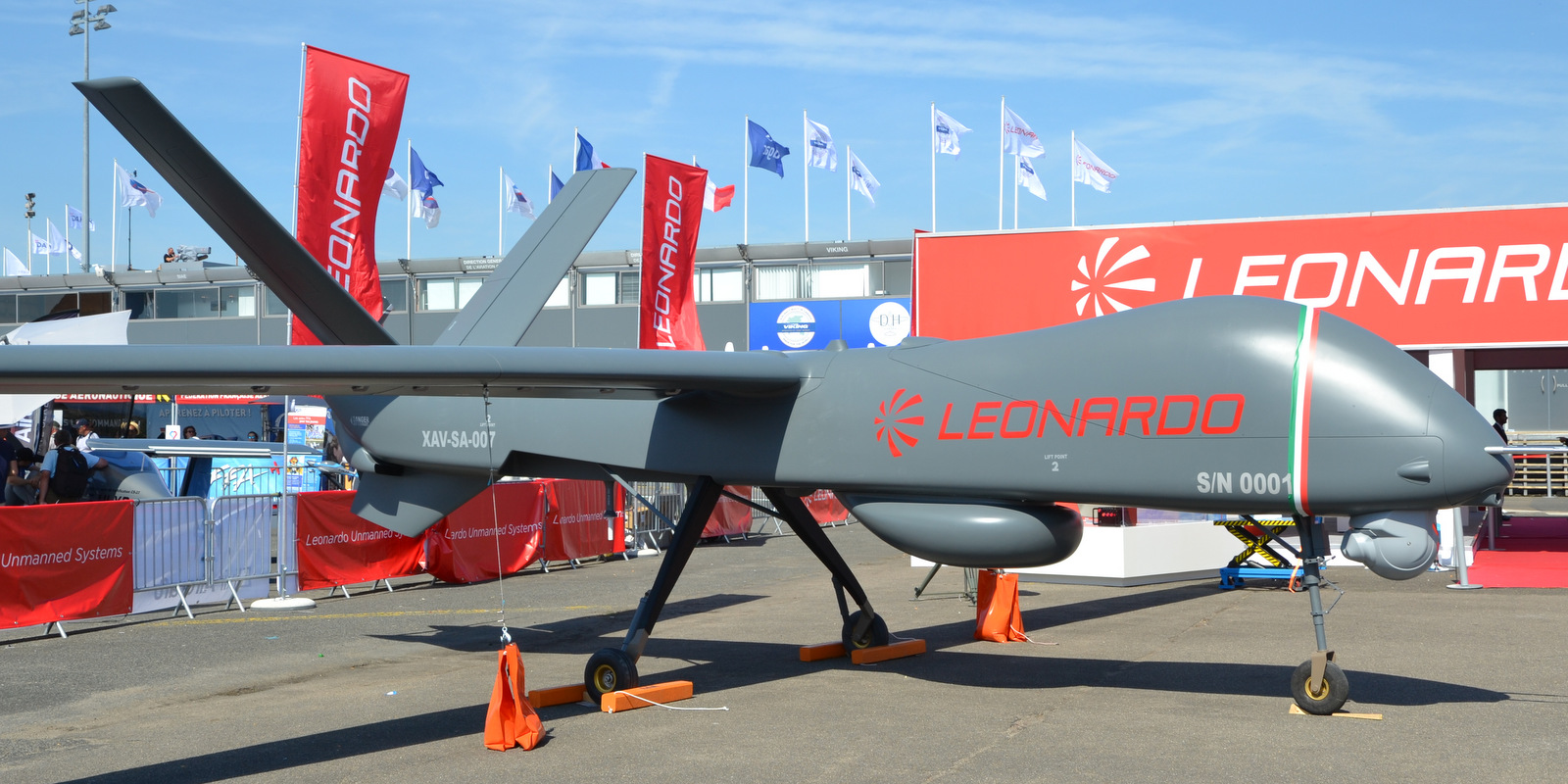
- Falco Xplorer at the 2019 Paris Air Show

General information
- Type: Remotely Piloted Aircraft System
- National origin: Italy
- Manufacturer: Leonardo S.p.A.
- Primary users

History
- First flight: 15 January 2020
- Developed from: Falco EVO

The Falco Xplorer is a MALE UAV capable of both intelligence, surveillance, target acquisition, and reconnaissance missions and airstrike missions, developed by Leonardo S.p.A. of Italy. Aimed at military and civilian markets, the drone is not subject to ITAR restrictions making it easily exportable around the world.

== Development ==
The Falco Xplorer was first presented at the Paris Air Show of 2019 by Fabrizio Boggiani, senior vice-president of airborne sensors and mission systems at Leonardo Electronics. On 15 January 2020, the Test Flight Department of the Italian Air Force conducted the first flight of the Xplorer at the Trapani–Birgi Airport. On 22 October 2020 during testing, an unknown problem forced one Falco to be ditched at sea. The Falco Xplorer finished its first round of testing on 22 December 2022, after which it started a new round of testing with the Direzione degli Armamenti Aeronautici e per l'Aeronavigabilità (ARMAEREO) with the objective to meet the NATO STANAG 4671 standard. At the 2023 Paris Air Show, Leonardo presented a version of the Xplorer armed with the Brimstone 3 missile, departing from the 2019's statements that there were no plans to manufacture an armed version of the platform. Leonardo hopes to complete the certification process and start receiving orders by 2024.
