= Rapid Sentry =

Counter unmanned air system

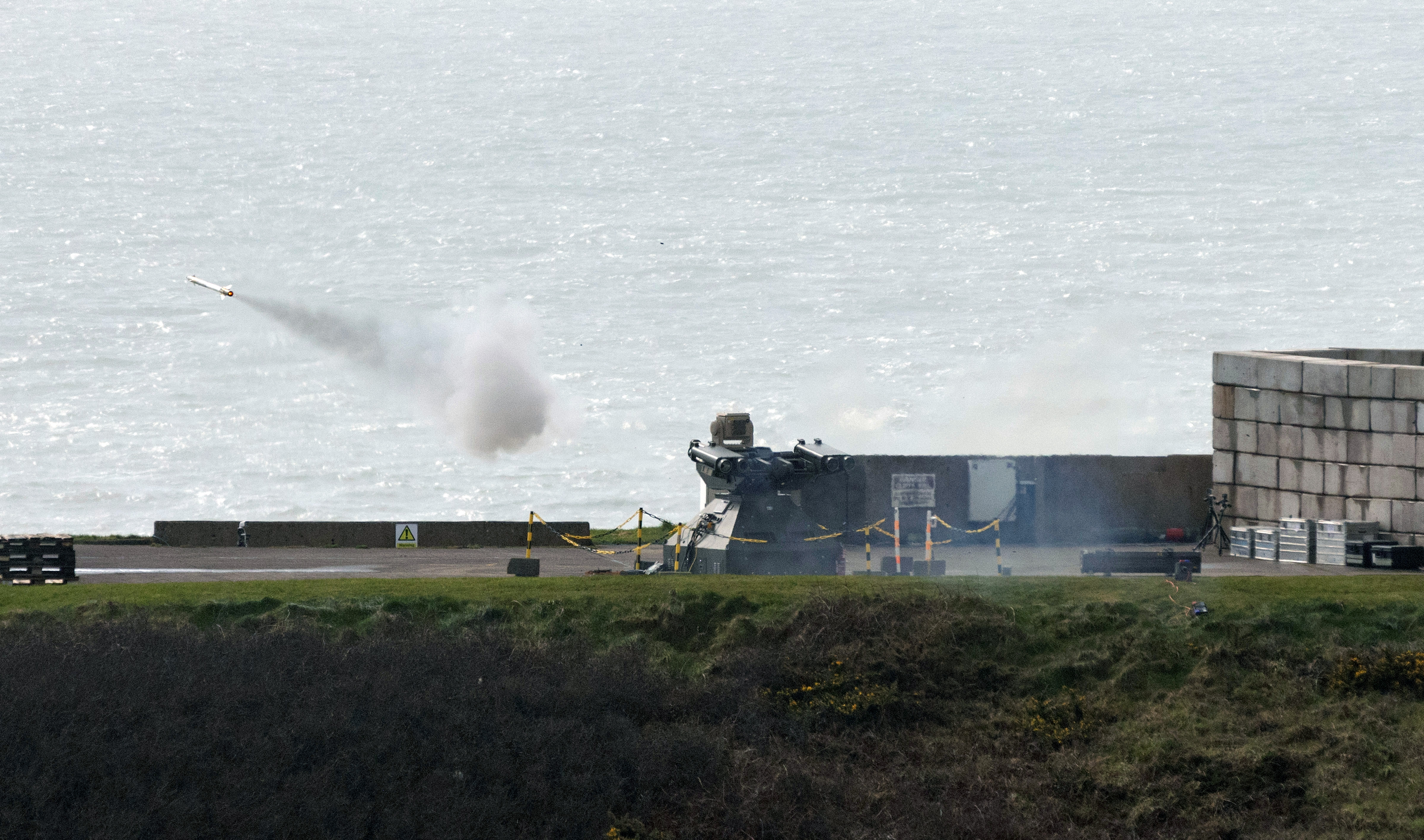
The Rapid Sentry air defence system firing a missile at the Air Defence Range at Manorbier, Pembrokeshire Coast National Park in Wales.

Rapid Sentry is a British short ranged counter-drone air-defence system armed with the Thales Martlet or the Lightweight Multirole Missile (LMM).

Images released by the British Ministry of Defence show a ground-based launcher capable of holding four missiles, two on either side of an electro-optical guidance unit.

The system is operated by the RAF Regiment and was deployed to various countries in the Middle East including Kuwait in 2026 to protect against Shahed and other drones fired by Iran. It is thought that Rapid Sentry can integrate with the SAAB Giraffe 1X radar, which is specifically designed to detect drones, or unmanned aircraft systems (UAS). It is part of a layered counter-UAS defence in which the RAF Regiment first attempts to detect, identify and track threats using systems such as ORCUS, purpose‑built electronic warfare counter‑UAS system. ORCUS also has a long-range thermal imaging camera to assist in identifying threats. It then attempts to disrupt the threat by using electronic warfare tools such as NINJA, a system designed to take over the control links used to operate many sorts of small commercial drones. If that fails it then destroys the threat using a system such as Rapid Sentry.

British troops using Rapid Sentry reportedly shot down dozens of drones fired by Iran and its proxies in March 2026 with the RAF claiming that "multiple operators" had each defeated five more threats, sometimes in as little as one night.
