= Aberporth Airport =

West Wales Airport
- IATA: none; ICAO: EGFA

Summary
- Airport type: Public
- Operator: West Wales Airport Ltd.
- Serves: Cardigan
- Location: Aberporth, Wales, UK
- Elevation AMSL: 428 ft (130 m)
- Coordinates: 52°06′53″N 004°33′34″W

Map
- Location in Wales

Runways
Direction	Length		Surface
Direction	m	ft	Surface
07/25	1,257	4,124	Asphalt
- Sources: UK AIP at NATS

Aberporth Airport (ICAO: EGFA) is situated southwest of Aberporth, Ceredigion, Wales. The airport is being developed as West Wales Airport for domestic flights. It is also developing as a centre for the deployment of civil and military unmanned aerial vehicles (UAVs), known as 'drones'. The airport underwent major improvements in 2008 which extended the length of the runway from 945 to 1,257 m (3,100 to 4,124 ft).

The site was previously RAF Aberporth, a former Royal Air Force satellite station which used by the RAF Army Cooperation Command, the site was also used the Royal Aircraft Establishment (RAE), the Defence Research Agency (DRA) and the Defence Evaluation and Research Agency (DERA) under the control of the Ministry of Defence until 2001.

During 1956, a brand-new asphalt runway was built, with other extensions of the hangar apron occurring during 1968 and 1971.

During the 1960s Aberporth was the HQ of the RAE Ranges Division.

== History ==
RAF Aberporth 1940-46 & 1959-84

The following military units were posted here at some point:

- 'B' Flight of No. 1 Anti-Aircraft Co-operation Unit RAF (1 AACU) (October 1941 – March 1942)
- 'L' Flight of 1 AACU (October 1941 – November 1942) became No. 1608 (Anti-Aircraft Co-operation) Flight RAF (November 1942 – December 1943)
- Detachment of 'O' Flight of 1 AACU (May – June 1942)
- 'Q' Flight of 1 AACU (June 1941 – November 1942) became No. 1609 (Anti-Aircraft Co-operation) Flight RAF (November 1942 – December 1943)
- 'X' Flight of 1 AACU (September 1940 – November 1942) became No. 1621 (Anti-Aircraft Co-operation) Flight RAF (November 1942 – December 1943)
- Detachment of No. 6 Anti-Aircraft Co-operation Unit RAF (January – May 1941)
- Detachment of No. 6 Air Observers School RAF (June 1942 – January 1943)
- Detachment of No. 7 Anti-Aircraft Co-operation Unit RAF (May 1941 – January 1942)
- Sub site of No. 7 Maintenance Unit RAF (1940)
- No. 595 Squadron RAF (December 1943 – April 1946)
  - 'A' Flight
  - 'B' Flight
  - 'C' Flight
- Detachment of No. 2758 Squadron RAF Regiment (9 September 1942-)
- Detachment of University of Wales Air Squadron
- Aberporth Station Flight (de Havilland Tiger Moth, Hawker Hurricane IV, Avro Anson C.19 & de Havilland Canada DHC-1 Chipmunk T.10)
- No. 29 Joint Services Trials Unit (September 1980 – June 1982) (Sea Skua)
- No. 1 Light Anti-Aircraft Practice Camp
- No. 1 Heavy Anti-Aircraft Practice Camp

RAE Aberporth 1939-73

The following units were posted here at some point:

- Bloodhound (Mk.2) Firing Unit with the Bristol Bloodhound Surface-to-air missile (November 1964 – December 1975)
- Guided Weapons Range Unit (July 1958 – March 1965)
- Operations and Engineering Wings of No. 21 Joint Services Trials Unit (July 1970 – ?) (BAe Rapier)
- No. 23 Joint Services Trials Unit (October 1971 – January 1973) (BAe Rapier)
- RAF Unit (Ministry of Supply) Aberporth (August 1953 – June 1958)
- Central Timing Unit
- Guided Weapons Trials Wing, RAE Aberporth

Polish Army Resettlement Corps Depot 1946-50

The airfield was used as a Polish Army Resettlement Corps Depot between 1946 and 1950.

== MOD Aberporth ==
The nearby range, MoD Aberporth started out as a Second World War British Army firing range. Due to the threat of Nazi Germany invasion, the Projectile Development Establishment moved from Fort Halstead to the range during 1940, with the Royal Air Force Combined Services Projectile Development Establishment being in existence between September 1943 and January 1945. The site was an outstation of PDE Fort Halstead and Royal Arsenal Woolwich.

The range was previously the Aberporth Anti-Aircraft Artillery Range and the Projectile Development Range along with The Aberporth Range. The Clausen Rolling Platform was built there to test radar and launchers against the rolling motion of ships at sea, without needing to go to sea.

It is used for testing rockets by the British military, as well as for launching civilian rockets for atmospheric research. The site is currently managed by QinetiQwith air traffic services provided by NATS.

== Current use ==
The airport is mainly used for testing unmanned aerial vehicles in an area called the West Wales UAV Centre which is connected to the Welsh Government created ParcAberporth.

No. 636 Volunteer Gliding Squadron RAF was present between October 1996 and December 2001

Aberporth Aerodrome has a CAA Ordinary Licence (Number P859) that allows flights for the public transport of passengers or for flying instruction as authorised by the licensee. The aerodrome is not licensed for night use.

The airfield is being used as a base for Thales Watchkeeper WK450 military unmanned aerial vehicle (UAV) trials over Cardigan Bay. On 13 June 2018 a Watchkeeper crashed into a lane near the airfield; there were no injuries.

== See also ==
- List of former Royal Air Force stations
