= DELAER RX-3 =

Tactical unmanned aerial vehicle

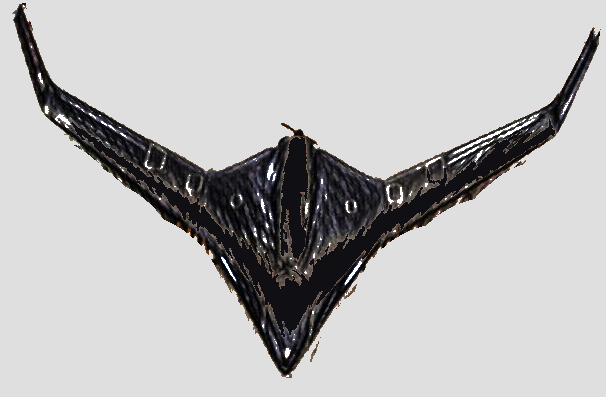
- DELAER RX-3 artistic representation

General information
- Type: Surveillance and Reconnaissance
- National origin: Greece
- Manufacturer: Carbon Fiber Technologies (CFT)
- Designer: Aristotle University of Thessaloniki
- Status: Prototypes only
- Number built: 2 (prototypes)

History
- Manufactured: 2021
- First flight: 2021
- Developed from: HCUAV RX-1
- Variant: RX-3 Plus
- Developed into: MPU RX-4 LOTUS

The DELAER RX-3 (from English: delivery and aerial) is a tactical unmanned aerial vehicle (UAV) currently under development by a consortium consisting of greek private companies and the Aristotle University of Thessaloniki. It is capable of performing border surveillance missions and aerial delivery of lifesaving supplies to islands and mainland territories via its internal cargo bay. A possible future use for military operations is being considered.

== Development ==
The development on the DELAER RX-3 started in 2018 and involved a consortium consisting of three research institutes of the Aristotle University of Thessaloniki of which the Laboratory of Fluid Mechanics and Turbomachinery acts as the project coordinator and two private companies, Intracom Defense Electronics (IDE) and Carbon Fiber Technologies (CFT). The project is co-financed by the European Union and Greek national funds.

In September 2018 at the 83rd Thessaloniki International Fair, the first true to size mockup of the DELAER RX-3 was presented to the public. During the fair the DEALER RX-3 caught the attention of military officials, paving the way for a national military UAV program.

In November 2020 during a televised interview on the Greek television broadcaster ERT with the coordinator of the DELAER RX-3 project prof. Dr. Kyros Yakinthos, it was announced that the construction of the RX-3 is scheduled to be completed by March 2021.

=== National defense ===
In June 2020 Intracom Defense Electronics (IDE) announced that its proposal for a tactical UAV system has been approved to be funded through the European Defense Industrial Development Program (EDIDP). In November of the same year IDE signed a €9.7 million grant agreement with the European Commission for the funding of the now named LOTUS(Low Observable Tactical Unmanned System) project.

IDE notes, that the LOTUS will utilize knowledge acquired through the development of both the HCUAV RX-1 and the DELAER RX-3. Furthermore, the consisting tripartite consortium will be expanded with additional companies and universities from Greece and European companies from Cyprus, Spain and the Netherlands.

== Design ==
The DELAER RX-3 is a novel unmanned aerial platform, emerging from the HCUAV RX-1, that introduced an improved design and more advanced fuselage characteristics. The aim was to improve aerodynamics, increase the payload, range, and the operational profile of the UAV in comparison to the previous generation. It was built with the extensive use of composite materials and a fixed wing design that incorporates a Blended Wing Body (BWB) architecture. Furthermore, it features an insulated payload-bay for the aerial delivery of supplies, advanced electronics and a one-man portable ground control station (GCS) that uses a double encrypted data-link to communicate and control the UAV.

The aerial vehicle was designed for complete autonomous flight and interconnection with the Greek civic protection network, since its initial and primary mission is provision of humanitarian aid and ground patrol of isolated forest, mountainous and island regions of Greece.

== Specifications ==
Data from LFMT, Aristotle University of Thessaloniki and Ptisi Magazine.

=== General Specifications ===
- Crew: 0 onboard, 1 in ground station
- Length: 4.15 metres (13.6 ft)
- Wingspan: 7.2 metres (24 ft)
- MTOW: 190 kilograms (420 lb)
- Payload: 50 kilograms (110 lb)
- Powerplant: 1x 54 hp engine

=== Performance ===
- Maximum Speed: 250 kilometres per hour (130 kn)
- Cruise Speed: 180 kilometres per hour (97 kn)
- Range: 130 kilometres (70 nmi)
- Endurance: 10 hours
- Take-off runway: <140 metres (460 ft)

=== Avionics ===
- Real-time 720p image quality cameras
- Autonomous flight planner
- Interconnection with the Hellenic Rescue Team Network (HRTN)
- SDR data-link
- Payload insulation
- Aerial-drop payload delivery system
- Data collection and management system
