= MLS Innovation =

Greek software engineering and telecommunications equipment company

MLS Innovation Inc.
- MLS headquarters in Thessaloniki, Greece
- Type: S.A. (corporation)
- Traded as: Athex: MLS
- Industry: Telecom hardware Software engineering
- Founded: October 1989
- Defunct: 2019
- Headquarters: Thessaloniki, Greece
- Products: Mobile phones, smartphones, tablet, computer, Smart home hub, Software
- Website: mlsinnovation.com at the Wayback Machine (archived November 19, 2023)

MLS Innovation Inc. was a Greek software engineering and telecommunications equipment company founded in October 1989 in Thessaloniki. In May 2001, it was officially listed on the Athens Stock Exchange. Its headquarters are in Thessaloniki, while the company keeps a commercial department in Athens. Since 2019 the company has been virtually defunct and its headquarters building was sold in an auction.

== Headquarters ==
In November 2014, MLS moved its headquarters to the Technopolitic Business Park of Thessaloniki, in order to take full advantage of the fastest growing area of Thessaloniki, which had already developed into a center of innovation and technology. The headquarters occupied a large area of 2,800 sq.m. where the following departments were housed:

- Administrative services
- Commercial department
- Software development
- Customer service
- Accounting office
- Warehouses

== MAIC (MLS Artificial Intelligence Center) ==
MAIC (MLS Artificial Intelligence Center), was the main promotional feature of MLS, which was built into all its devices. MAIC had dramatically evolved the user experience from all MLS devices while interacting with the user. It used voice recognition technologies to perform the following actions:

- Calls,
- SMS and emails,
- Search the Internet or YouTube,
- GPS and information about nearby pharmacies, hospitals, banks, gas stations,
- Information about nearby parking, traffic and weather conditions,
- Launch installed apps,
- Encyclopedic searches and dictation of their summary,
- Translate words or sentences from Greek to English and vice versa.

== Products ==
=== Navigation devices ===
In 2003, the company developed the first automatic navigation system in the Greek market and, in 2005, launched MLS Destinator, the standard automatic car navigation system, which quickly became a market leader. In 2006, the company made another breakthrough with the release of MLS Destinator Talk & Drive, the first navigation system based on voice recognition. Since 2011 the company had taken a new direction aimed at international markets with the installation of the MLS Destinator Talk & Drive® navigation system, entering foreign markets.

=== Educational boards ===
In 2010, MLS entered the educational technology market and completed the development of its own innovative interactive touch board, the MLS IQBoard, for use in all forms of classroom-based educational technology. MLS undertook the supply and installation of approximately 1,100 iQBoards, totaling 1.6 million Euros.

=== Smartphones ===
In 2012 the company expanded its commercial activities in the mobile telephony market by launching the first Greek Android smartphone, the MLS iQTalk. The Greek smartphone combined voice recognition and artificial intelligence technologies as well as built-in Talk & Call technology, which allowed users to speak the contact's name to automatically call them. The iQTalk Crystal MLS tracking model additionally integrated Talk & SMS which allowed users to dictate the content of their text message before it was automatically sent. Focusing on research and development, MLS developed its new Talk & Post for Facebook innovation integrated into the MLS iQTalk King model. Talk & Post for Facebook app allowed the user to upload posts using only his voice. In November 2013, the MLS iQTalk Crystal Max was introduced to the market introducing the first 4.5-inch MLS mobile phone to incorporate the Talk & Email application that allowed the user to dictate an email while it was automatically written on the phone. In January 2014, MLS launched the latest MLS iQTalk Silk smartphone, providing the ability to lock and unlock the phone by voice command. Talk & Lock enabled the storage of a spoken command that could lock and unlock the device.

=== MLS Diamond ===
At the end of 2015, MLS announced the creation of a new category of products with the brand name "Diamond", which included the premium smartphone models MLS Diamond 4G, MLS Diamond 5.2 4G and MLS Diamond Fingerprint 4G.

=== Tablet ===
In 2013 the company expanded its field of action in the tablet market with the launch of the first Greek Android tablet, MLS iQTab. MLS iQTab incorporated the innovations Talk & Post for Facebook and Talk & Email, the latter allowing dictation of emails by voice. In a short period of time, MLS launched three additional Android tablet models MLS iQTab 3G, MLS iQTab King and MLS iQTab Crystal Alu. In November 2013, the MLS iQTab Navi was launched, incorporating the innovative MLS Destinator Talk & Drive app, which guides the user to the specific destination via spoken command. The MLS iQTab Astro 3G, one of the next models introduced to the market, incorporated the "family" function, which provides simultaneous use of one and only MLS iQTab Astro 3G by many different users.

=== Smart TV ===
In 2015, MLS released the first full-fledged MLS Android Super Smart TV. The MLS Super Smart TV was an all-in-one Android device with lots of features and apps. As with other products in the field of smart devices with Android operating system, MLS Super Smart TV incorporated MLS voice recognition technologies, which allow a user to change channels, find and play movies or songs, search on Google (Greek or English), post updates to social media, etc. on his television screen.

=== 2-in-1 tablet & laptop ===
In 2016 MLS introduced MLS Magic, a product functioning as a tablet and a laptop which supported dual boot of both Windows and Android.

=== MAIC Smart Hub ===
In 2018, MLS launched the first Greek-speaking 3D AI digital assistant. MAIC, a desktop tablet device, gave you the ability to do everything by voice. You could play music, watch videos, get the weather and news, control your smart appliances, find answers to your questions, call your friends, and even chat. At the beginning of 2022, the company's servers were permanently closed, due to the huge financial problems it was facing, making it impossible to activate new devices, while there were problems with the already activated ones. MAIC was the company's last major innovation.

== Corporate Bonds ==
MLS announced on Tuesday, July 19, 2016, the trading of approximately 400 common nominal securities with a value of 10,000 euros, which will begin trading on the Alternative Fixed Income Market of the Athens Stock Exchange. The duration of the corporate bond is four (4) years with the possibility of extension for one (1) additional year. At the end of each coupon period, which will be quarterly, the issuer will deposit the coupon amount to each security holder of the Corporate Notes calculated based on an annual interest rate of 5.30%. (bond rate).

== European Projects ==
Research and development was the core of the company's activities, and thus MLS Innovation participated in various collaborations and research projects while providing its expertise to third parties, developing and supporting applications in the fields of educational technology, language technology, telematics and multimedia applications. A list of European projects in which MLS has participated is presented below:

- Inlife
- Movesmart
- Prosperity4All
- Choreos

== Market Share ==
At the end of 2015 MLS reached the top of tablet sales in Greece, with an impressive market share of 17%.

== The Bankruptcy ==
Liquidity problems began in 2019, with the company's last published financial data for 2019, when MLS had a turnover of €14.7 million, compared to €21.0 million in 2018. After-tax results in 2019 amounted to a loss of €31.2 million, compared to a loss of €3.0 million in 2019. 2018. In the end, with almost zero activity, the company's offices were put up for auction in 2023, which was later postponed. The company had not published balance sheets for the financial years 2020, 2021 and 2022, with the three bond loans unpaid and almost zero economic activity.
