= Aberporth =

Seaside village in Ceredigion, Wales

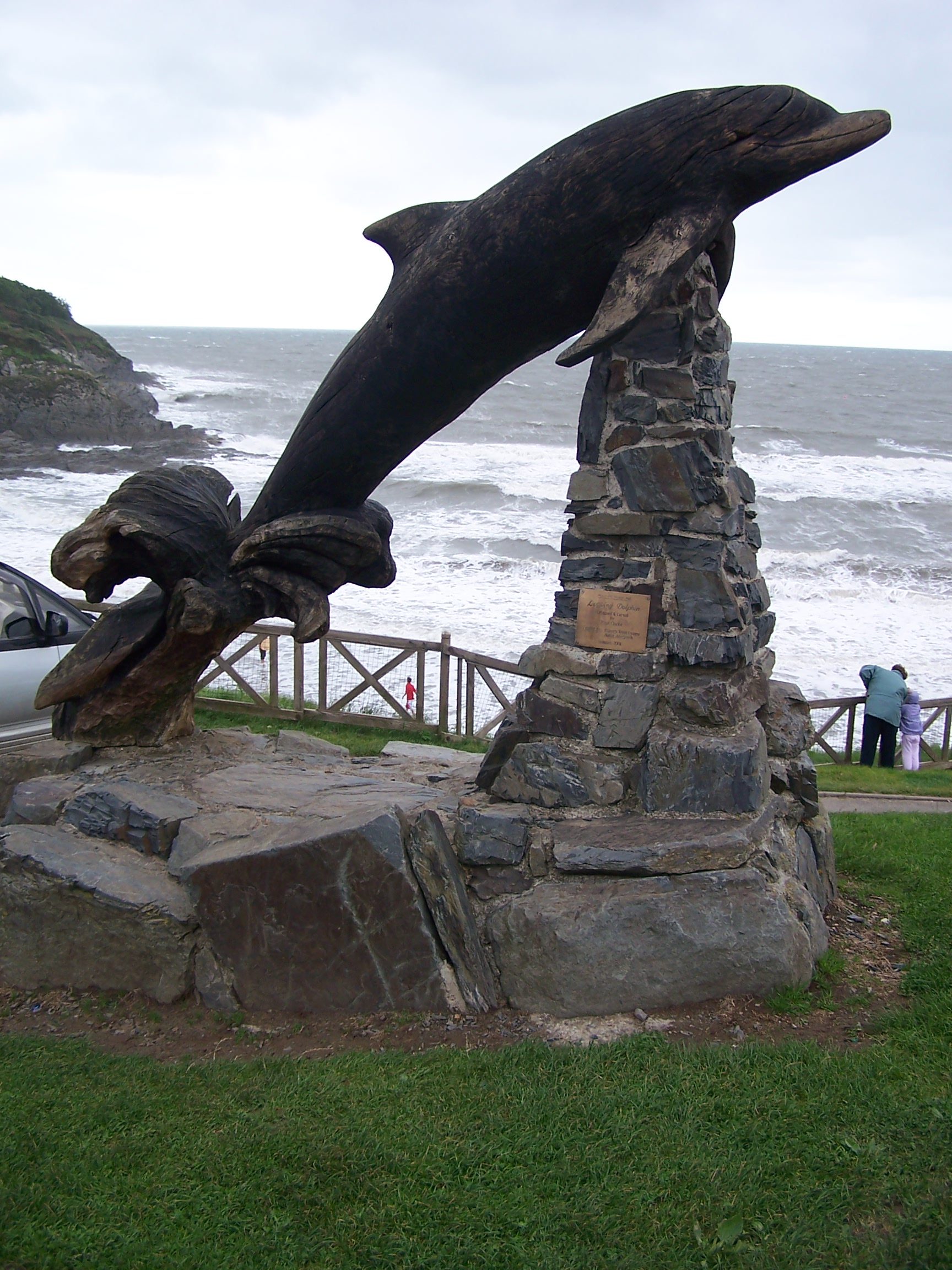
- Leaping Dolphin sculpture, in Aberporth

- Location within Ceredigion
- Population: 2,374 (2011)
- OS grid reference: SN2549251448
- Principal area: Ceredigion
- Preserved county: Dyfed
- Country: Wales
- Sovereign state: United Kingdom
- Post town: Cardigan
- Postcode district: SA43 2
- Police: Dyfed-Powys
- Fire: Mid and West Wales
- Ambulance: Welsh
- UK Parliament: Ceredigion Preseli
- Senedd Cymru – Welsh Parliament: Ceredigion Penfro
- List of places UK Wales Ceredigion 52.133333°N 4.55°W Community map: Map of the community

Aberporth is a seaside village, community and electoral ward in Ceredigion, Wales. The population at the 2001 Census, was 2,485, of whom 49 per cent could speak the Welsh language. At the 2011 Census, the population of the community was 2,374 and of the village 1241. Aberporth's beaches have earned Blue Flag status.

== Location ==
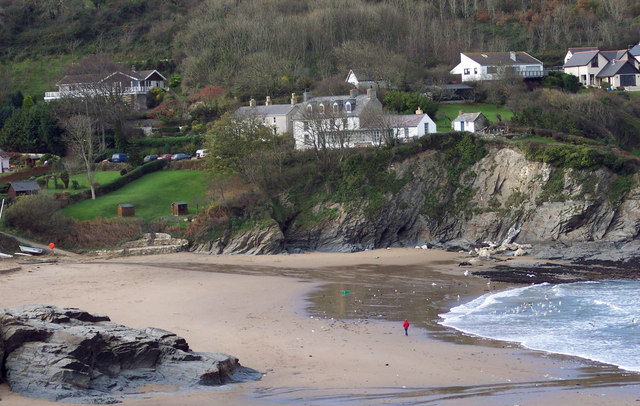
One of the two beaches in Aberporth

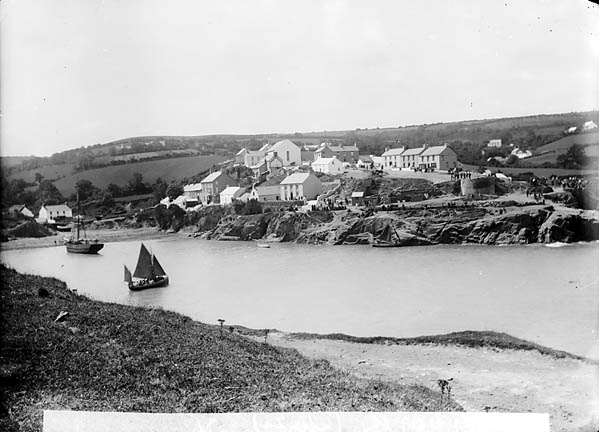
Aberporth c. 1885

Aberporth is on the Ceredigion Coast Path, part of the Wales Coast Path, at the southern end of Cardigan Bay, about 6 miles (10 km) northeast of Cardigan and 10 miles (16 km) southwest of New Quay. The Fishguard to Bangor Trunk Road (A487) is reached via the B4333 road in about 2 miles (3 km).

== Etymology ==
The name Aberporth is first recorded in 1284, and is derived from the Old Welsh “aber” (mouth) and “porth” (port).

== History ==
In the 16th century, boats, nets and salt for preserving were brought in from Ireland. Aberporth became a subsidiary port of Cardigan. The landing point developed rapidly in the late 17th and early 18th centuries as local people began to take part in the maritime trade. It became a very active port; the northern of the two beaches extended into the river valley and provided a safe anchorage. Lime kilns, coal yards and warehouses were built on its south shore.

Aberporth developed into a centre of the herring fishing industry in Wales. Drifting and netting were both employed, and at one time at least 20 full-time herring smacks, a type of traditional fishing boat, went to sea regularly. The industry continued until the beginning of the First World War, when fish stocks declined.

== Governance ==
Aberporth is the name of the electoral ward which is coterminous with the community, although before 1995 it was a ward of Dyfed County Council and included the neighbouring communities of Penbryn and Y Ferwig. Since 1995, the ward has elected one county councillor to Ceredigion County Council. Independent councillor Gethin James represented the ward from 2004 until the May 2017 election when he was beaten by Plaid Cymru candidate Gethin Davies.

Aberporth is represented at the local level by 12 community councillors on Aberporth Community Council.

== Amenities ==
The small St Cynwyl's Anglican parish church was renovated in 1857, but has been decaying over the last few decades.

The village has two sandy beaches: Traeth y Dyffryn ("valley beach"), also known as Traeth y Llongau ("ships beach"), and Traeth Dolwen Both have been awarded a Blue Flag several years running. Aberporth is a recreational fishing village in the summer and is also used by divers and boating people. Crab and lobster fishing continues on a small scale.

In 2006 orcas and harbour porpoises were seen, but such sightings are rare. Even rarer was a turtle seen in 2005. Sunfish and basking sharks are sometimes seen offshore in the summer. Bottle nose dolphins are a common sight offshore, by the MoD site from April each year.

Apart from tourism, the main local employer is the Ministry of Defence at the Qinetiq missile range. ParcAberporth technology park hosts organisations involved in the sectors of defence, aerospace and the technology of UAVs known as drones. ParcAberporth is linked with the research facilities at Aberystwyth University. Aberporth Airport (ICAO: EGFA) is being developed as West Wales Airport for domestic flights, and as a centre for the deployment of civil and military drones. The airport underwent major improvements in 2008, which extended the runway from 945 to 1,257 m (3,100 to 4,124 ft).

== Education ==
Aberporth School, established in 1834, had 31 pupils in 1836. In 1854, a building for 110 pupils was built; average attendance in 1904 was 68. It was a national school providing elementary education, in accordance with the teaching of the Church of England, to the children of the poor. In 1926, it became a Church of England school.

In 1915, a council school was established.

Ysgol Gymunedol Aberporth is the present-day primary school in Aberporth. There were 122 pupils on the roll in 2013. Only 12 per cent came from homes where Welsh was the main language (down from 16 per cent in 2007). It was in the A/B category according to the Local Education Authority's language policy in 2001, but by 2007, it had changed into a category A school, meaning that Welsh is now the main language of teaching there.

== Notable people ==
The Village is notable for producing four Welsh Rugby internationals and one British and Irish Lion:

- Ricky Evans (born 1960), Welsh rugby union international, was born in Aberporth.
- Wayne Proctor (born 1972), Welsh rugby union international, raised in Aberporth.
- Paul Ringer (born 1948), Welsh rugby union international, raised in Aberporth.
- Brynmor Williams (born 1951), Welsh rugby union international and British and Irish Lion, was raised in Aberporth.

== Climate ==
The Met Office has a weather station at Aberporth. It is one of the 22 coastal locations whose reports are included in the BBC Shipping Forecast. Data goes back to 1941.

Typically, less than three days of the year reach 25.1 °C (77.2 °F) or above, the warmest of which will on average be 26.8 °C (80.2 °F). The highest temperature recorded at Aberporth was 34.7 °C (94.5 °F) during June 2026. On average 14.5 nights a year report air frost and the coldest night of the year will fall to −5.9 °C (21.4 °F). The lowest recorded temperature was −10.0 °C (14.0 °F), during March 1958.

Rainfall averages some 927 mm a year, with at least 1 mm falling on 152 days.

Climate data for Aberporth 133m asl (1991-2020 normals, extremes 1941-)
Month	Jan	Feb	Mar	Apr	May	Jun	Jul	Aug	Sep	Oct	Nov	Dec	Year
Record high °C (°F)	13.5 (56.3)	18.1 (64.6)	21.0 (69.8)	24.4 (75.9)	29.5 (85.1)	34.7 (94.5)	33.6 (92.5)	34.2 (93.6)	28.6 (83.5)	25.0 (77.0)	18.4 (65.1)	14.4 (57.9)	34.7 (94.5)
Mean daily maximum °C (°F)	7.8 (46.0)	7.9 (46.2)	9.4 (48.9)	11.6 (52.9)	14.3 (57.7)	16.7 (62.1)	18.3 (64.9)	18.3 (64.9)	16.7 (62.1)	13.6 (56.5)	10.5 (50.9)	8.5 (47.3)	12.8 (55.0)
Daily mean °C (°F)	5.6 (42.1)	5.6 (42.1)	6.8 (44.2)	8.7 (47.7)	11.2 (52.2)	13.7 (56.7)	15.4 (59.7)	15.5 (59.9)	13.9 (57.0)	11.3 (52.3)	8.3 (46.9)	6.3 (43.3)	10.2 (50.4)
Mean daily minimum °C (°F)	3.4 (38.1)	3.3 (37.9)	4.2 (39.6)	5.7 (42.3)	8.2 (46.8)	10.7 (51.3)	12.5 (54.5)	12.7 (54.9)	11.2 (52.2)	8.9 (48.0)	6.2 (43.2)	4.1 (39.4)	7.6 (45.7)
Record low °C (°F)	−9.9 (14.2)	−8.9 (16.0)	−10.0 (14.0)	−2.2 (28.0)	0.1 (32.2)	1.7 (35.1)	5.6 (42.1)	4.4 (39.9)	3.3 (37.9)	−0.9 (30.4)	−5.6 (21.9)	−6.0 (21.2)	−10.0 (14.0)
Average precipitation mm (inches)	90.1 (3.55)	67.4 (2.65)	57.2 (2.25)	54.2 (2.13)	54.7 (2.15)	60.4 (2.38)	66.5 (2.62)	75.4 (2.97)	70.6 (2.78)	107.0 (4.21)	117.2 (4.61)	106.5 (4.19)	927.1 (36.50)
Average precipitation days (≥ 1.0 mm)	15.3	11.8	11.3	11.1	10.3	9.6	10.7	11.6	12.1	15.0	17.2	16.2	152.1
Mean monthly sunshine hours	62.4	82.4	132.4	180.9	222.8	216.1	202.2	179.6	148.7	103.9	61.9	50.9	1,644.2
Source 1: Met Office
Source 2: Starlings Roost Weather
