= Medium-altitude long-endurance UAV =

Unpiloted aircraft classification capable of up to 9000 m altitude and 200+ km range

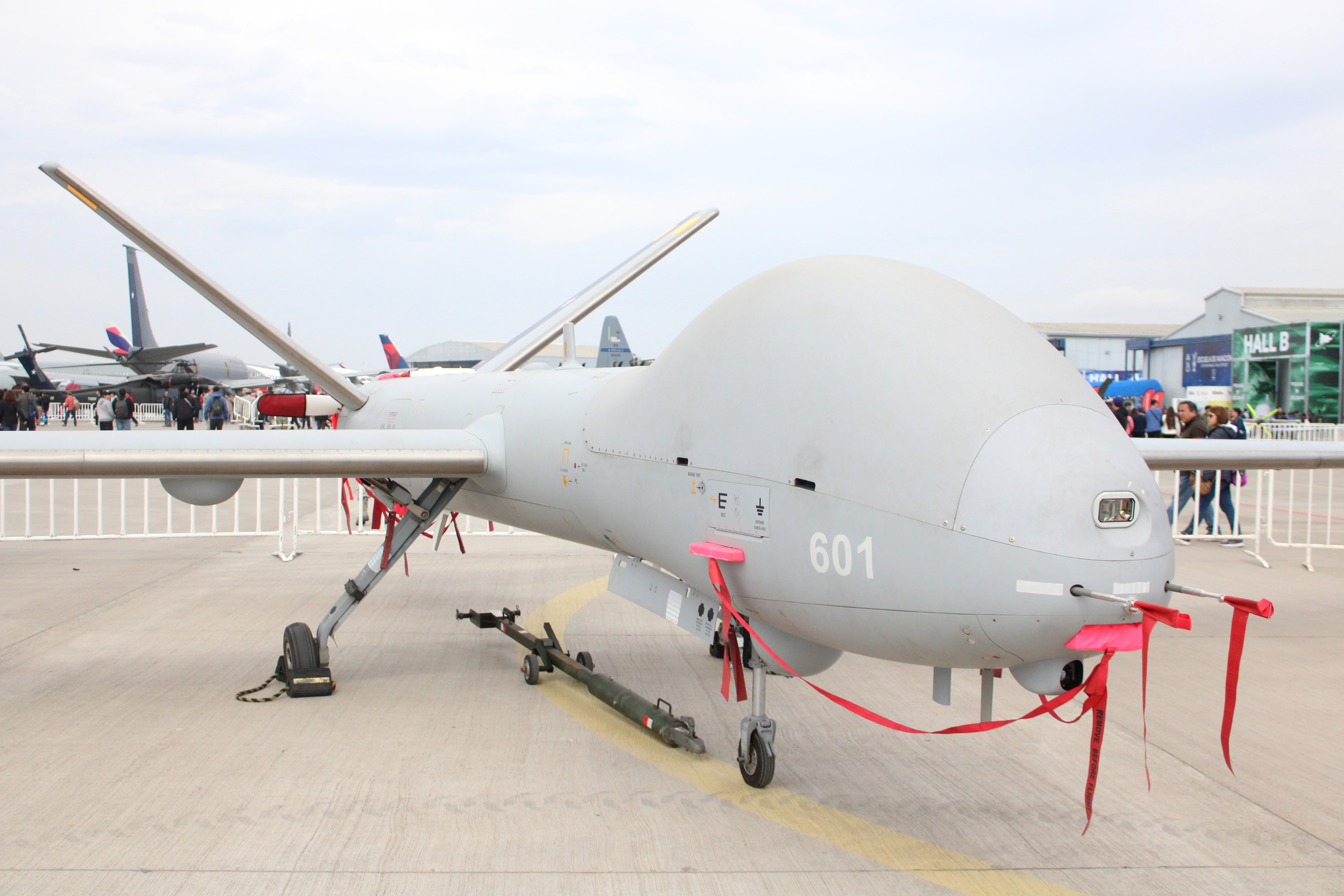
An Elbit Hermes 900 UAV, which has a maximum altitude of 30.000 feet (9100 Meters)

A medium-altitude long-endurance (MALE) unmanned aerial vehicle flies at an altitude window of 10,000 to 30,000 feet (3,000–9,000 m) for extended durations of time, typically 24 to 48 hours. This list includes both unmanned combat aerial vehicle and unmanned reconnaissance aerial vehicle.

UAV	Country	Service ceiling	Endurance	Max takeoff weight
Aeronautics Defense Dominator	Israel	30,000 ft (9,100 m)	24 hours	1,200 kg (2,640 lb)
Baykar Bayraktar TB2	Turkey	25,000 ft (7,620 m)	27 hours	700 kg (1,540 lb)
CAIG Wing Loong 1	China	16,000 ft (5,000 m)	20 hours	1,100 kg (2,425 lb)
CAIG Wing Loong II	China	32,500 ft (9,900 m)	32 hours	4,200 kg (9,259 lb)
Chengdu Wing Loong-3	China	32,800 ft (10,000 m)	40 hours	6,200 kg (13,670 lb)
DELAER RX-3	Greece	6,000 ft (1,830 m)	10 hours	190 kg (420 lb)
Denel Dynamics Bateleur	South Africa	26,000 ft (8,000 m)	18–24 hours	1,000 kg (2,205 lb)
DRDO Archer-NG	India	28,000 ft (10,668 m)	28 hours	1,800 kg (1,587 lb)
TAPAS-BH-201	India	26,000 ft (10,668 m)	18 hours	1,800 kg (1,587 lb)
EADS Talarion	Europe/Turkey	49,213 ft (15,000 m)		10,000 kg (22,046 lb)
Elang Hitam	Indonesia	30,000 ft (9,150 m)	30 hours	1,300 kg (2,866 lb)
Elbit Hermes 900	Israel	30,000 ft (9,100 m)	36 hours	1,100 kg (2,425 lb)
Eurodrone	Europe	44,900 ft (13,700 m)	18–40 hours	11,000 kg (24,251 lb)
Falco Xplorer	Italy	30,000 ft (9,100 m)	24 hours	1,300 kg (2,866 lb)
General Atomics MQ-1 Predator	US	25,000 ft (7,600 m)	24 hours	1,020 kg (2,249 lb)
GIDS Shahpar-III	Pakistan	41,000 ft (12,500 m)	40 hours	1,650 kg (3,638 lb)
HAI Pegasus II	Greece	15,092 ft (4,600 m)	15 hours	250 kg (551 lb)
HCUAV	Greece	10,000 ft (3,050 m)	11 hours	185 kg (407 lb)
IAI Heron	Israel	33,000 ft (10,000 m)	52 hours	1,150 kg (2,535 lb)
IAIO Fotros	Iran	25,000 ft (7,600 m)	16–30 hours	3,500 kg (7,716 lb)
INTA Milano (es:INTA Milano)	Spain	25,591 ft (7,800 m)	7–20 hours	
Kronshtadt Orion	Russia	24,600 ft (7,500 m)	24 hours	1,150 kg (2,535 lb)
KAL KUS-FS (MUAV)	South Korea	45,000 ft (13,716 m)	24 hours	5,750 kg (12,566 lb)
Milkor 380	South Africa	30,000 ft (9,144 m)	35 hours	1,300 kg (2,866 lb)
Northrop Grumman Firebird	US	25,000 ft (7,600 m)	40 hours	2,268 kg (5,000 lb)
Qods Mohajer-6	Iran	25,000 ft (7,600 m)	12 hours	600/670 kg (1,323/1,477 lb)
Shahed 129	Iran	24,000 ft (7,300 m)	24 hours	
(Stella Tecnologia Atobá)	Brazil	16,404 ft (5,000 m)	28 hours	500 kg (1,100 lb)
TAI Aksungur	Turkey	40,000 ft (12,192 m)	60 hours	3,300 kg (7,275 lb)
TAI Anka	Turkey	30,000 ft (9,144 m)	30 hours	1,700 kg (3,748 lb)
Vestel Karayel	Turkey	22,500 ft (6,900 m)	8–20 hours	630 kg (1,388 lb)
Yabhon United 40	UAE	22,965 ft (7,000 m)	120 hours	1,500 kg (3,306 lb)
