= Fiq Airfield =

Fiq Airport
- IATA: none; ICAO: LLFK

Summary
- Airport type: Private
- Owner: Government of Syria (de iure); Government of Israel (de facto)
- Operator: General Authority of Civil Aviation (de iure); Golan Regional Council (de facto)
- Location: near Fiq and Katzrin
- Elevation AMSL: 1,218 ft / 371 m
- Coordinates: 32°47′07″N 35°43′02″E
- Interactive map of Fiq Airport

Runways
Direction	Length		Surface
Direction	ft	m	Surface
04/22		1,300	asphalt

Fiq Airfield (also known as Pik) (Arabic: مطار فيك, romanized: Maṭār Fīq al-Duwalī) (ICAO: LLFK) is an airfield in the Quneitra Governorate, Syria, (Golan Heights) occupied by Israel, near the Israeli settlement and kibbutz Afik. The airfield has been used to test drones, including by Switzerland.

The airfield is also used for private aviation activity and operated by the Israeli Golan Regional Council. Fiq has seen traffic drop in recent years, but is used by Elbit Systems to test their Unmanned aerial vehicles. The airfield was the site of Israel's 2001 Kart racing championship, and there is talk of converting it into a race track.

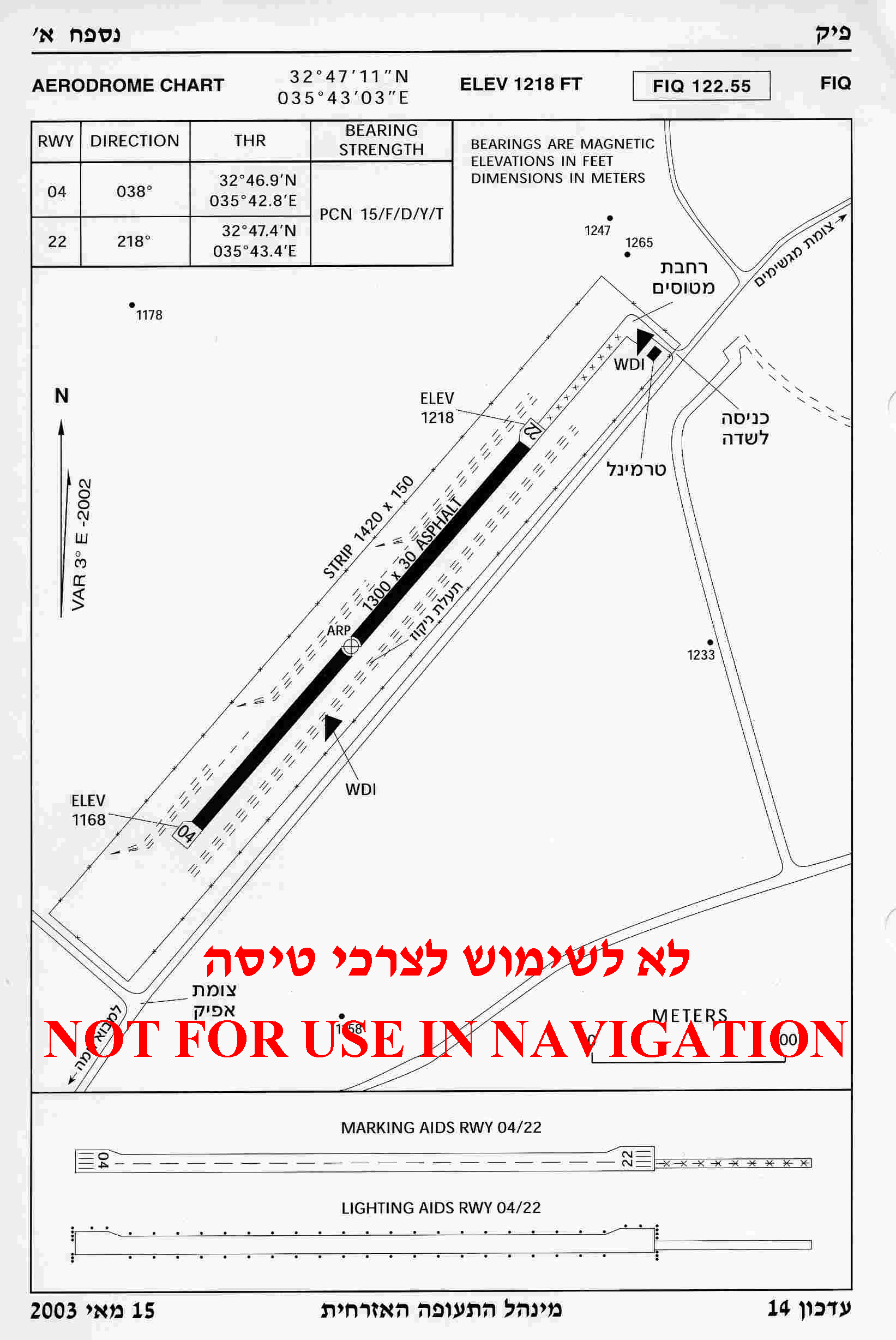
Fiq Aerodrome chart
