= List of video games developed in Iran =

The following is a list of video games developed in Iran.

Title	Genre	Engine	Platform	Date	Developer	Publisher
41148	Adventure	Unity engine	Android	2017	Mahdi Fanaei	Mahdi Fanaei
Age of Paladins	RPG		PC	2009	Modern Industry Center	Ras Games
Bebei	Platformer	Game-editor The Cross Platform Game Creator	Windows O.S	Fall 2007 November 25	Shah Kaar Ab Shahaboddin Habibi Khoozani	itch.io app store.
Sialk	Board Game	Unity engine	Android O.S	Fall 2021	Shah Kaar Ab Shahaboddin Habibi Khoozani	CafeBazaar, itch.io app stores.
Bahram The Goat And The Assyrian Tree	Side Scroll, Runner	Unity engine	Android O.S	Winter 2025	Shah Kaar Ab Shahaboddin Habibi Khoozani	Myket, CafeBazaar, itch.io app stores.
Yoosht	Visual Novel	Unity engine	Android O.S	Winter 2025	Shah Kaar Ab Shahaboddin Habibi Khoozani	Myket, itch.io app stores.
The 58 Houses of Sialk	Board Game	Unity engine	Android O.S	Fall 2025	Shah Kaar Ab Shahaboddin Habibi Khoozani	Myket, CafeBazaar, itch.io app stores.
Children of Morta	Action role-playing, roguelike		PC, Nintendo Switch, PlayStation 4, Xbox One	2019	Dead Mage	11 Bit Studios
E.T. Armies	FPS	Unreal Engine	PC	2016	Respina games	Merge Games
Engare	Puzzle		PC	2017	Mahdi Bahrami	Mahdi Bahrami
Fighting in Aden Gulf	FPS	Unity engine	PC	2012	Amytis Entertainment	
Garshasp: The Monster Slayer	Action adventure		PC	2011	Fanafzar Sharif Studios, Dead Mage Inc	Loh Zarrin Nikan
Legends of Persia	Action adventure	Custom engine	PC	2014	Sourena Game Studio	Plug In Digital
Mir-Mahna	FPS	TGEA	PC	2011	ESPRIS	ESPRIS
Nobody's Left	Action adventure	Unreal Engine	PC, PlayStation 5, Xbox Series X (TBD)	2023 (TBD)	Mohammad Khakzad	Mad Rain Studio
Quest of Persia	Third person	C4 Engine	PC	2005–2009	Puya Arts	Puya Arts
Safire Eshgh	Third person	Unreal Engine	PC	2020	The Islamic Revolution Center for Digital Products and Publications – MATNA	MATNA
Special Operation 85: Hostage Rescue	FPS		PC	2007	Union of Students Islamic Association	
What Happened	Adventure	Unreal Engine	PC	2020	Genius Slackers	Sourena Game Studio, Katnappe Sp. z o.o.
Revenge	First-person shooter	Unreal Engine	PC	2024	KOSAR3D	KOSAR3D
Adventures of ESI: Space thieves	side-scrolling action platformer	Game maker studio	PC	2021	Ehsan Hosseiny Pajouh	ESI Game Studio
