= Age of Heroes =

Age of Heroes may refer to:

- Age of Heroes (comics), a 2010 Marvel Comics Heroic Age series
- Age of Heroes (film), a 2011 British war film
- Age of Heroes (video game), a 2009 Iranian game
- The Age of Heroes, a 2004–2005 South Korean TV series broadcast by MBC TV

== See also ==
- Heroic Age (disambiguation)
