= Black Friday (1978) =

Mass shooting of protesters in Pahlavi Iran on 8 September 1978

- Part of the Iranian Revolution
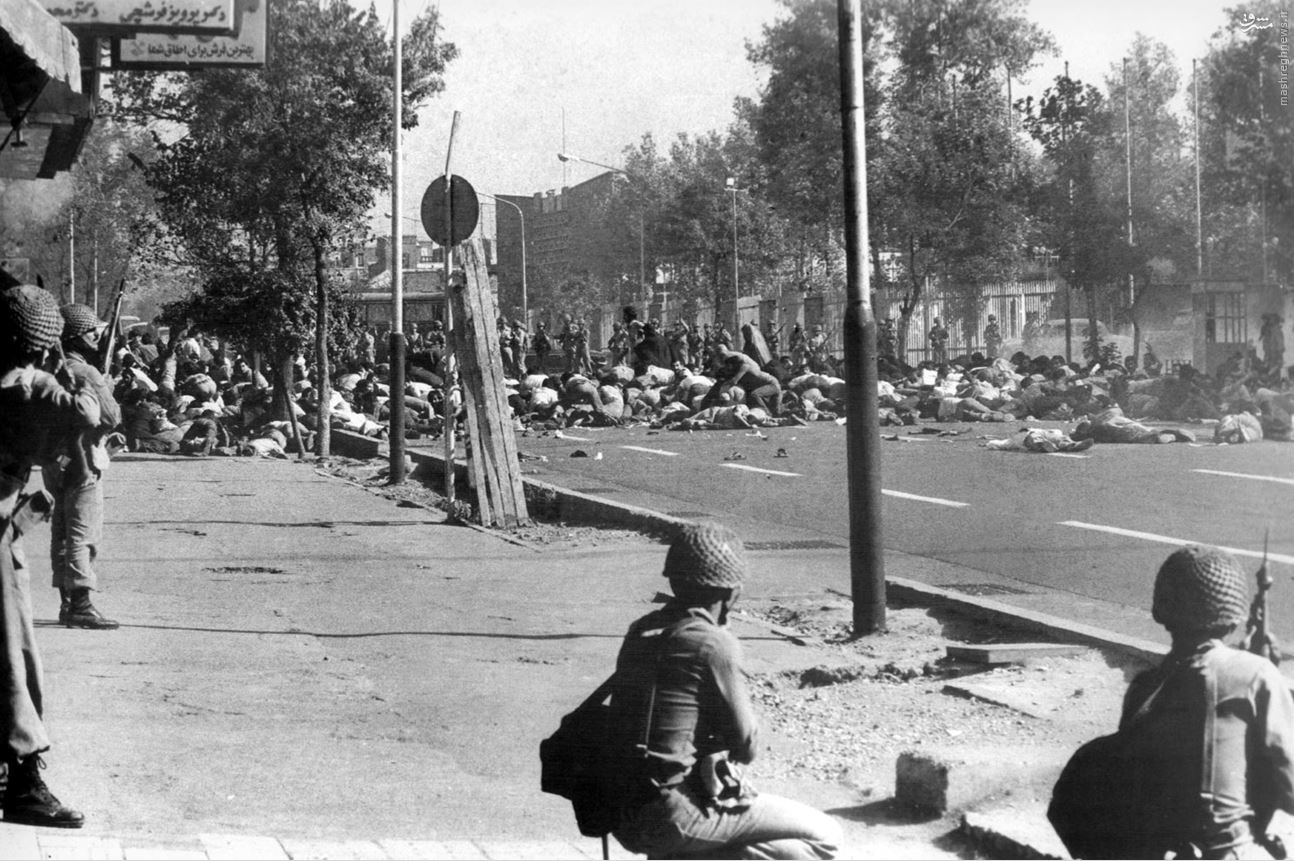
- Native name: جمعه سیاه
- Location: Tehran, Iran
- Date: 8 September 1978 (IRST, UTC+3:30)
- Target: Protestors
- Attack type: Massacre, mass shooting
- Deaths: 118, including: 64 protestors in Jaleh Sq.; 30 government security forces; 24 other protesters elsewhere)
- Injuries: 205 wounded
- Perpetrator: Imperial Army of Iran

Black Friday (Persian: جمعه سیاه, romanized: Jom'e-ye Siyāh) was a mass shooting on 8 September 1978 (17 Shahrivar 1357 in the Solar Hijri calendar) in Pahlavi Iran, during which the Imperial Army of Iran killed 64 civilians and injured 205 in Jaleh Square (Persian: میدان ژاله, romanized: Meydān-e Zhāleh), Tehran. According to Spencer C. Tucker, 30 government security forces were also killed. The deaths were a pivotal event in the Iranian Revolution that ended any "hope for compromise" between the protest movement and the regime of Shah Mohammad Reza Pahlavi.

== Incident ==
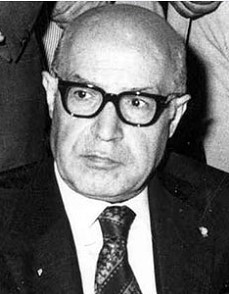
Sharif-Emami named his government as "Government of National reconciliation"

As protests against the Shah's rule continued during the first half of 1978, the Iranian government declared martial law. On 8 September, thousands gathered in Tehran's Jaleh Square for protest, unaware that the government had declared martial law a day earlier. The army ordered the protestors to leave, and subsequently opened fire on them, killing at least 64 and injuring 205.

=== Casualties ===
Initially, the opposition and Western media reported "15,000 dead and wounded", in stark contrast to Iranian government officials, who reported only 86 dead. For instance, the BBC's correspondent in Iran, Andrew Whitley, reported that hundreds had died. French social theorist Michel Foucault initially reported that 2,000 to 3,000 people had died, but later raised that number to 4,000. Johann Beukes, author of Foucault in Iran, 1978–1979, notes that "Foucault seems to have adhered to this exaggerated death count at Jaleh Square, propagated by the revolting masses themselves. Thousands were wounded, but the death toll unlikely accounted to more than hundred casualties".

In contrast, the military historian Spencer C. Tucker reports 94 were killed on Black Friday, consisting of 64 protesters and 30 government security forces. Iranologist Richard Foltz also supports 64. Lastly, Emadeddin Baghi, a former researcher at the Foundation of Martyrs and Veterans Affairs (part of Iran's post-revolution government, which compensates families of victims), who was hired "to make sense of the data" on those killed on Black Friday, reports 64 were killed in Jaleh Square on Black Friday, with two females: one woman and a young girl. On the same day in other parts of the capital, 24 people died in clashes with martial law forces, with one female, making the total casualties on the same day to 88 deaths. Another source puts the foundation's tabulation of dead at 84 during that day.

Since the 2000s, Pahlavi Iran's former Minister of Education Manouchehr Ganji, has suggested greater ambiguity in the situation, in particular the presence of Palestinian guerrillas in Iran, who they believe were agitators.

== Aftermath ==
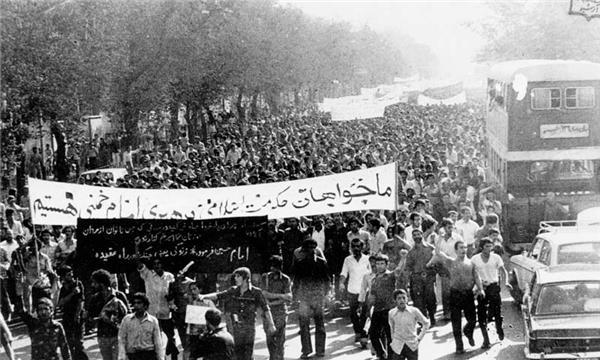
In demonstration of Black Friday, the sentence on the placard: "We want an Islamic government, led by Imam Khomeini".

Black Friday is thought to have marked the point of no return for the revolution, and it led to the abolition of Iran's monarchy less than five months later. It is also believed that Black Friday played a crucial role in further radicalizing the protest movement, uniting the opposition to the Shah and mobilized the masses. Historian Ervand Abrahamian describes the incident as "a sea of blood between the shah and the people." Initially, opposition and western journalists claimed that the Iranian army had massacred thousands of protesters. The clerical leadership announced that "thousands have been massacred by Zionist troops". According to the historian Abbas Amanat:

The clerical activists, backed by the Qom marja's, capitalized on the Jaleh Square massacre to paint the regime as brutal and illegitimate. Aided by a rumor-mongering machine that became fully operational in the absence of reliable media and news reporting, the number of casualties, the “martyrs” on the path of Islam, was inflated to thousands, and the troops who opened fire on them were labeled as Israeli mercenaries who were brought in to crush the revolution.

The events triggered protests that continued for another four months. The day after Black Friday, Amir-Abbas Hoveyda resigned as minister of court for unrelated reasons.

A general strike in October shut down the petroleum industry that was essential to the administration's survival, "sealing the Shah's fate". The continuation of protests ultimately led to Shah leaving Iran in January 1979, clearing the way for the Iranian Revolution, led by Ayatollah Ruhollah Khomeini.

== Legacy ==
After the revolution, the square's name was changed to the Square of Martyrs (Maidan-e Shohada).

=== In Persian ===
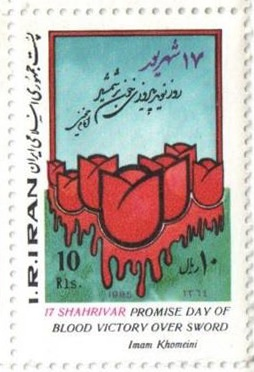
A 1985 stamp

In 1978 shortly after the massacre, the Iranian musician Hossein Alizadeh set Siavash Kasraie's poem about the event to music. Mohammad Reza Shajarian sang the piece "Jāleh Khun Shod" (Jaleh [Pers. "the dew"] turned to blood.).

=== In English ===
Nastaran Akhavan, one of the survivors, wrote the book Spared about the event. The book explains how the author was forced into a massive wave of thousands of angry protesters, who were later massacred by the Shah's military. The 2016 adventure video game 1979 Revolution: Black Friday is based on the event. The game is directed by Navid Khonsari, who was a child at the time of the revolution and admitted he did not have a realistic view of what was taking place. Khonsari described creating the game as "[wanting] people to feel the passion and the elation of being in the revolution – of feeling that you could possibly make a change."

== See also ==
- Cinema Rex fire
