= Monster Slayer =

Monster Slayer may refer to:

== Literature ==
- "Monster Slayer", a short story in the comic book anthology Avatar: The Last Airbender – The Lost Adventures
- Monster Slayer, a Graphic Universe comic book based on Beowulf
- Poesy the Monster Slayer, a comic book written by Cory Doctorow
- Monster Slayer Online, a novel duology written by R.R. Virdi

== Games ==
- Monster Slayer, a Ranger archetype in the tabletop RPG Dungeons & Dragons
- Garshasp: The Monster Slayer, a 2011 action-adventure computer game
- The Witcher: Monster Slayer, a geolocation-based mobile role-playing game

== Other uses ==
- Nayenezgani, a character from the Navajo creation myth
- Jack Brooks: Monster Slayer, a 2007 comedy horror film
