= Torn Away =

2023 video game

- Developer: perelesoq
- Publisher: OverGamez
- Director: Artem Koblov
- Engine: Unity
- Platforms: Windows; Xbox One; Xbox Series X/S; Nintendo Switch; PlayStation 4; PlayStation 5
- Release: 29 September 2023 (Windows); 6 October 2023 (Xbox One, Series S/X); 3 February 2024 (Nintendo Switch, PlayStation 4, PS5)
- Genre: Adventure
- Mode: Single-player

Torn Away is a narrative adventure game developed by perelesoq and published by OverGamez. It was first released for Windows in September 2023, with versions for Nintendo Switch, PlayStation 4 and PS5, and Xbox One and Series X/S following in 2023 and 2024.

== Gameplay ==
Torn Away is narrative adventure game played mostly from a side-scrolling view with first-person sections. The player controls Asya overcoming obstacles posed by the terrain or enemy soldiers.

== Plot ==
Torn Away takes place during the "Great Patriotic War", the Eastern Front of World War II, from the perspective of 10 year-old Soviet girl Asya. She and her mother became forced laborers, Ostarbeiter, after the German army was attacking their home in the Soviet Union. After losing her mother in an attack on their labor camp, Asya runs away trying to find a way back to her family's home.

== Development ==
Torn Away was developed by Moscow, Russia-based developer perelesoq. In April 2021, the game was announced to be published Nordcurrent in 2021. Following the 2022 Russian invasion of Ukraine, Nordcurrent stopped working with perelesoq, which later managed to regain the rights for Torn Away in negotiations. Through funding for a new project, perelesoq was able to continue working on the game. Publisher OverGamez reached out to perelesoq and negotiated to publish the game.

The game was released for Windows on 29 September 2023, following with a Xbox One and Series X/S versions on 6 October 2023. Nintendo Switch and PlayStation 4 and PS5 version released on 3 February 2024.

== Reception ==
Reception

Aggregate scores
Aggregator	Score
Metacritic	PC: 85/100; XONE: 82/100
OpenCritic	82/100; 78% Critics Recommend

Review score
Publication	Score
Adventure Gamers	4.5/5 stars

Softpedia's Cosmin Vasile reviewed the game, praising the story's difficult historical moments and protagonist Asya. They noted that Torn Away takes an immersed perspective using the framing "Great Patriotic War" of Soviet propaganda, which "might be uncomfortable" to some given Russia contemporary military use.

Alyssa Hatmaker of Adventure Gamers praised the historical narrative and child perspective, while not being more profound than "war is terrible".

3dnews.ru's Александр Бабулин similarly found Torn Away to be more "anti-war" than a work of art, while noting its uniqueness for video games.

=== Accolades ===
Year	Award	Category	Result	Ref.
2023	IndieCade	Performance Spotlight	Nominated	
2023	Game Connection Europe	Grand Award	Won	
2023	Game Connection Europe	Best PC Game	Nominated	
2023	Game Connection Europe	Best Visual Art & Design	Nominated	
2023	Game Connection Europe	People’s Choice Award	Nominated	
