= Mahdi Bahrami =

Iranian computer programmer

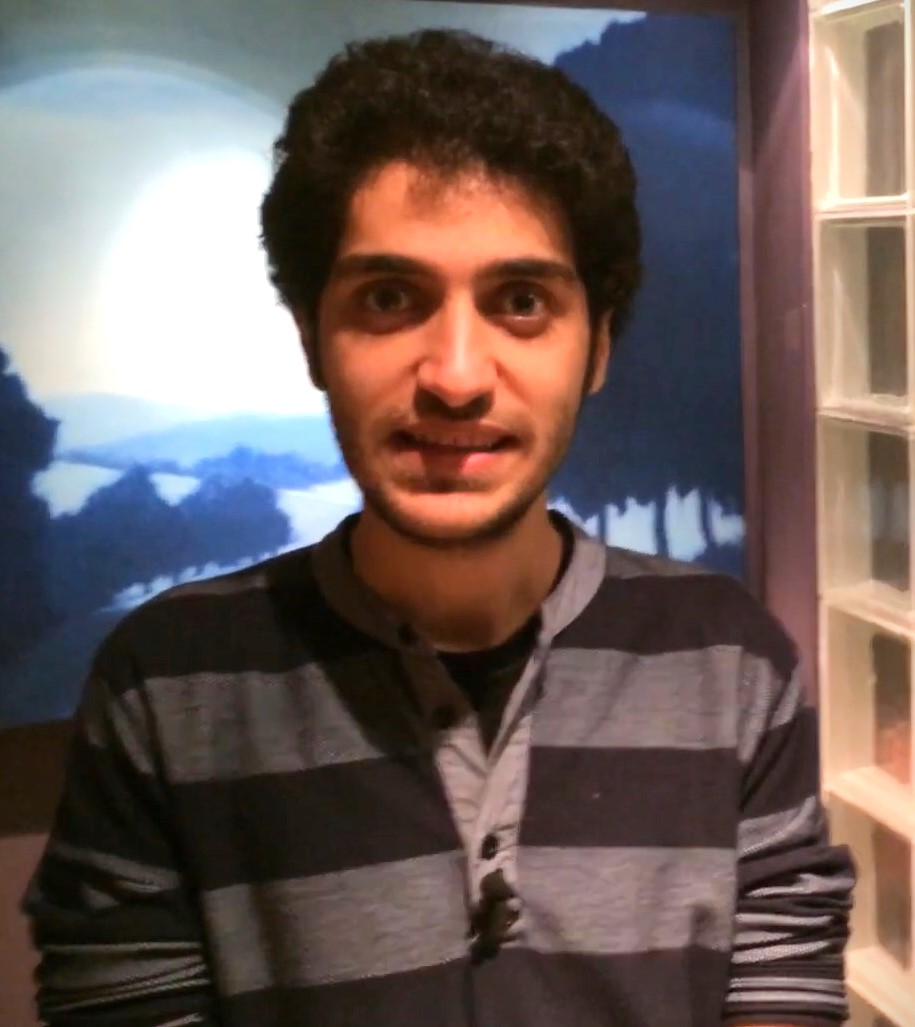
- Bahrami at the 2014 Game Developers Conference
- Born: 1994 (age 31–32); Isfahan, Iran

Mahdi Bahrami (Persian: مهدی بهرامی) is an Iranian computer programmer, video game designer and developer.

== Early life ==
He was born in Isfahan. He was interested to the programming and mathematics from his childhood. He went to the Netherlands aged 19, where he made video games like Engare and Farsh.

== Awards ==
- IGF Student Showcase winner" San Francisco, 2014
- Culture Award at Tehran Games Festival" Tehran, 2017
- Best Game Design at Tehran Games Festival" Tehran, 2017
- IndieCade Nominee" Los Angeles, 2015
- Most innovative game at Tehran Game Convention" Tehran, 2017
- Sense of Wonder Night official selection" Tokyo, 2010
