= Grand Mosalla Mosque =

Grand Mosalla Mosque may refer to:

- Grand Mosalla of Tehran
- Grand Mosalla of Isfahan
