= Tehran Game Convention =

Annual Iranian video games convention

- Status: Active
- Genre: Video Games
- Location: Tehran, Iran
- Country: Iran
- Inaugurated: 16 July 2017; 9 years ago
- Organizer: Co-Organized by: Iran Computer and Video Games Foundation & Game Connection
- Website: www.tehrangamecon.com

The Tehran Game Convention exhibition is a video game conference being held by Iran Computer and Video Games Foundation in partnership with Game Connection. The convention is slated to be Iran's first business to business-approached international event in the field of video games.

Iran Computer and Video Games Foundation is a non-government cultural organization which operates under the Ministry of Culture and Islamic Guidance.

== Goals and expectations ==
The main goal for this event is to create contact between computer game developers in Iran and international publishing companies.

The game industry in Iran has more than a decade's worth of experience and has created hundreds of games, yet it has never had an opportunity to enter the international market. TGC intents to create this opportunity for the first time for Iranian game developers.

== Event layout ==
The TGC exhibition will include three main sessions:

=== B2B Area ===
The B2B area of the TGC includes booths and spaces dedicated to business meetings.

=== Conferences ===
The conference area of the TGC is where speakers from all around the world gather.

=== Gamestan Awards (Development Awards) ===
Gamestan is made up of two parts: game + Persian suffix stan and is used to refer to a great geographical area of the video games industry.

== Game Connection meeting application ==
This event, which is occurring in collaboration with Game Connection France, will be using a program provided by their management.

== Dates and venue ==
The first edition of TGC was held in July 2017.

TGC 2018 will take place on 5 and 6 July 2018 at the IRIB's International Conference Center.

== See also ==
- Electronic Entertainment Expo
- PAX (event)
- Gamercom
- Game Developers Conference
- Brasil Game Show
- Games Convention
- Asia Game Show
- Paris Games Week
- Tokyo Game Show
- IgroMir
