= Age of Paladins =

2009 Iranian video game

Age of Heroes
- Developer(s): Modern Industry Center
- Publisher(s): Ras Games
- Platform(s): Windows
- Release: 2009
- Genre(s): Action-adventure

Age of Heroes (Persian: عصر پهلوانان) (previously named Age of Pahlevans or Asre Pahlevanan) is a 2009 Iranian video game. Created by the Modern Industry Center, it was released by Ras Games and the National Foundation for Computer Games with support from the Ferdowsi Foundation.

The plotline of Age of Heroes, derived from Ferdowsi's epic the Shahnameh, centers on the efforts of Atar, son of Pishad and commander of the kingdom of Sistan, to fight against demons which have captured and laid waste to much of the region.

The game was named the best Iranian game by emag, and was positively received as a promoter of Iranian culture and heritage by other critics.

== See also ==
- Orient: A Hero's Heritage
- Special Operation 85: Hostage Rescue
