= Arman Arian =

Iranian author, novelist and researcher

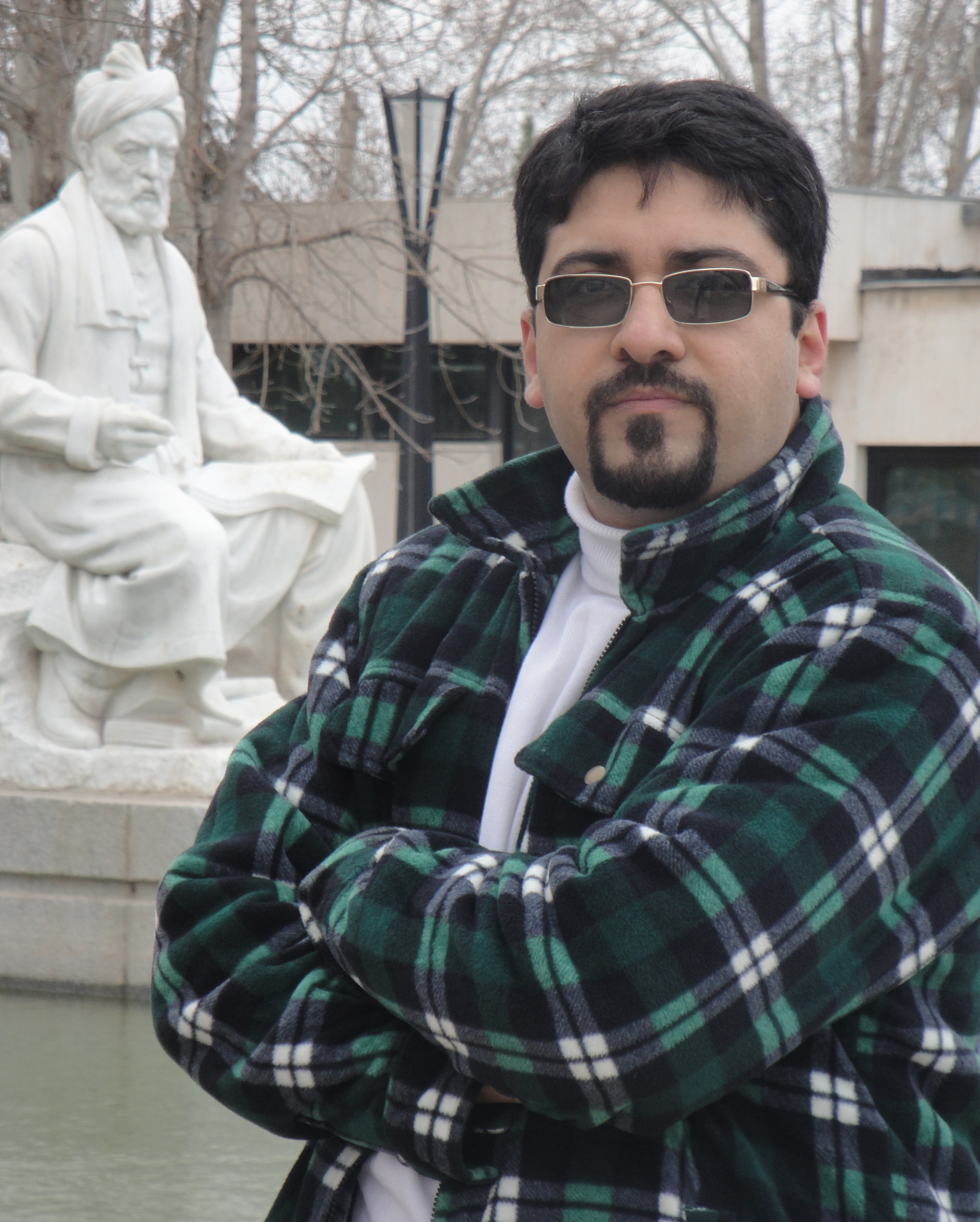
Arman Arian beside the tomb of Ferdowsi, 2012.

Arman Arian (Persian: آرمان آرین; born 1 September 1981) is an Iranian author, novelist and researcher, best known for his first trilogy, Persians and I (Persian: پارسیان و من: کاخ اژدها). He is the youngest winner of the annual “The Book of The Year of Iran”. In addition to many national awards, he received the honorary diploma in the 31st IBBY World Congress in Copenhagen, Denmark (2008) by the International Board on Books for Young People the highest recognition available to creators of children's books. Although Arian is known as a children and young adults fantasy writer, he doesn't limit his genre to fantasy and also, his books are well received by wide range of readers from all age groups. Persians and I became the best-selling novel in the 19th Tehran International Book Fair, 2006.

In his writings, Arman Arian presents a combination of his academic background in Cinema studies with an extensive knowledge of myths, religions and history. “We need to look back to our cultural heritage to survive in the intricate modern life”, he said in an interview with Borna News in order to explain his intention to dig into Iranian ancient literature, history, mythical and epical stories.

== Awards ==
- Winner of the annual prize by The Children's Book Council of Iran for the trilogy of "Ash vaz dang heh" as the best fiction book of the year, 2016.
- Winner of the annual book prize of "Payvar" for the trilogy of "Ashvazdangheh", 2016,
- Winner of the diploma of the first book prize of Mehdi Azar Yazdi for the trilogy of "Ash vaz dang heh", 2016
- The board of appreciation in “the Millennium Festival of Ferdowsi” For young researchers in Ferdowsi's Shaahname by the Youth Institute of Tehran's Municipality. 2010.
- Winner of the honorary diploma in the 31st IBBY World Congress in Copenhagen, Denmark by the International Board on Books for Young people 2008, for the book the Persians and I
- The annual prize of “The Book of The Year of the Islamic Republic of Iran” was featured as the youngest recipient of this prestigious prize since its establishment in 1955, 2005.
- The annual prize of -“Mehrgan e Adab” for writers and publishers, 2005

== List of books ==
- Patash Khoargar 2,(Persian:پَتَش خوآرگر 2: مردی از تبار اژدها), Ofogh publishing house, 2016
- Writing about Writing, (نوشتن درباره نوشتن), Moaj publishing house, 2016
- Shahnamag:Myths Six volumes,(Persian:شاهنامَگ: اسطوره ها), Chekke publishing house, 2015
- Patash Khoargar 1,(Persian:پَتَش خوآرگر۱: حماسه سرآغاز), Ofogh publishing house, 2015
- Ash vaz dang heh 2: Invincible Demons,(Persian: اشوزدنگهه 2), Moaj publishing house, 2014
- Ash vaz dang heh 3: Emancipatory Epic,(Persian: اشوزدنگهه 3), Moaj publishing house, 2013
- Shadowy light (Persian: تاریک روشنا), Ghatreh Publication House, 2014
- Ancient Future3: The First Night Story (Persian: آینده کهن), Safran Publication House, 2013
- Ancient Future2: The First Night Story (Persian: آینده کهن), Safran Publication House, 2013
- Ancient Future1: The Last Night Story (Persian: آینده کهن), Safran Publication House, 2013
- The book of spell(Persian: افسون نامه), Iranban publishing house, 2011
- The nightmare of the dark garden(Persian: کابوس باغ سیاه), Iranban publishing house, 2011
- The encyclopedia of the Avesta’s dramatic elements(Persian:دانشنامه تصویری و نمایشی اوستا), Moaj publishing house, 2011
- The Book of Wisdom (Persian: صد پند هزار بار شنیده), Iranban publishing house, 2012
- The quiet hubbub, a collection of thoughts and articles (Persian: غوغای خموش ), Moaj publishing house, 2011
- The dream of the white garden(Persian: رویای باغ سپید), Iranban publishing house, 2010
- The guide to storytelling for computer games(Persian:راهنمای بازی نامه نویسی ), Co-authored, The National Computer game organization, 2010.
- Sepit maan: the story of Zoroaster's life (Persian: سپیتمان), Iranban publishing house, 2009
- Ash vaz dang heh 4:God, The World, and Thoughts: Ash vaz dang heh's Six-Thousand-Year-Old Manuscripts (Persian: اشوزدنگهه 4), Moaj publishing house, 2009
- Ash vaz dang heh 1: the myth now,(Persian: اشوزدنگهه 1), Moaj publishing house, 2008
- Bitter Earrings: a collection of short stories(Persian: گوشواره تلخ), Moaj publishing house, 2007. Bitter Earring is published in Turkish (Turkish: Acı Küpe)by Demavand Publication House, 2015
- The Trilogy of the Persians and I(Persian: سه گانه پارسیان و من), Moaj publishing house, 2006.
- Persians and I: the resurrection begins(Persian: پارسیان و من، رستاخیز فرا می رسد), Moaj publishing house, 2005
- Persians and I: the secret of the bird mountain (Persian: پارسیان و من، راز کوه پرنده)), Moaj publishing house, 2004
- Persians and I: Azh dahak Fortress(Persian: کاخ اژدها), Moaj publishing house, 2003

== Computer games and script ==
- Ario: The little hero: An animated serial, produced by Saba & paarsima corporations, 2007. It participated in the 27th International Children Film Festival under the name of Legend of the Jewels Land, 2013.

== Other activities ==
- Conducting the "Creative Writing Workshop" in Eastern Mediterranean University, North Cyprus, 2014
- He teaches the first professional workshop of scenario writing held by Iran National Foundation of Computer Game, 2010.
- Conducting and teaching in a "Myths and Legends" workshop, 2009
- He was a juror of the 1st International Tehran Game Expo and Festival, 2011
- He was the judge in the First NoGhalam (Persian:نوقلم) amateur Story-writing Competition, 2009.
