= Engare =

2017 indie puzzle game by Iranian game designer

- Developer: Mahdi Bahrami
- Publisher: Mahdi Bahrami
- Composer: Mim Rasouli
- Platforms: MacOS, Windows
- Release: 23 October 2017
- Genre: Puzzle
- Mode: Single-player

Engare is a puzzle game created by Iranian game designer Mahdi Bahrami and soundtracked by Mim Rasouli, playable on PC and MacOS. Describing itself as "a game about motion and geometry", Engare's design is based upon Islamic art and sacred geometry. The game consists of two gameplay modes: a puzzle-solving mode, where the player has to recreate shapes shown onscreen by placing a point on a moving object, akin to a Spirograph tool, and a free-form art tool allowing the player to design their own patterns. First prototyped in 2010, Engare was released in October 2017, and retails for $6.99 on Steam and Bahrami's website. The game's release was delayed by difficulties caused by international sanctions imposed upon Iran, making it difficult for Bahrami to travel and access resources.

== Background ==
Bahrami has described the influences behind both the game's aesthetics and mechanics. The traditional Islamic geometric patterns featured in the game are widespread in Iran, and particularly in Bahrami's hometown of Isfahan, including the central Naqsh-e Jahan Square, a UNESCO World Heritage site. The game's mechanic was inspired by a question asked by Bahrami's high-school geometry teacher, when he asked students to imagine what shape would be traced by a point fixed to a ball when rolled across a flat surface - the result being a series of loops. Bahrami explains that even students who did not understand geometry were interested in the answer to this puzzle, and he was interested in using Engare to "explore mathematics in different ways [...] for some people it's easier to explore maths when it's visualised," and that "video games as a medium have great potential [for] these visualisations." Despite this, Bahrami says, he did not originally set out to make an educational game. The game is Bahrami's second to be inspired by traditional Islamic patterns, following Farsh, a game inspired by Persian carpets, which his mother wove when he was growing up.

== Gameplay ==
Engare has two gameplay modes. The first is a puzzle-solving mode, where the player must recreate a shape shown on-screen by placing a point on a moving object that is drawn into a line as the object moves. As the puzzles become more complex, the player is rewarded with the creation of more and more intricate patterns created from their solution; in later levels these patterns repeat themselves and are coloured in. After enough puzzles are solved, a second gameplay mode is unlocked: a pattern design tool where the player can place dots and lines or colour in tiles to create repeating geometric patterns. These patterns can then be mapped onto a 3-D mosque-like dome and explored from different perspectives.

== Reception ==
Engare has been received positively, with a demo version presented at the 2014 GDC Experimental Gameplay Workshop generating positive press coverage. Since its release, Engare has been praised by Sam Machkovech of Ars Technica, who describes the game as "[feeling] absolutely magical and unique in the gaming realm," and Robin Hunicke of EA and Funomena, who was "blown away [by] the cleverness of the puzzles". Rami Ismail of Vlambeer has praised the game on several occasions, naming it as one of his top 10 games of 2017 in an article for Giant Bomb, and as 'one of the games that he admires the most' in a GameSpot feature. The game has been similarly well-received by players on Steam, where it holds an overall "very positive" rating, and has won several awards, including the Student Showcase at the Independent Games Festival and the Excellence in Design and Culture Award categories at the Tehran Video Game Festival.

== See also ==
- Spirograph
- Sacred geometry
- Islamic geometric patterns
