= Entertainment Software Rating Association =

Age and content rating system in Iran

Entertainment Software Rating Association (ESRA)
- Type: Self-regulatory
- Industry: Organization and rating system
- Founded: 2007
- Headquarters: Tehran, Iran
- Area served: Iran
- Key people: Orit Michiel (President); Stacy Feuer (Senior VP, Privacy); Bill Garrity (Senior VP, Ratings); David Kassack (Senior VP, Finance and Operations)
- Website: esraa.ir

The Entertainment Software Rating Association (ESRA; Persian: نظام ارزیابی و رده‌بندی سنی بازی‌های رایانه‌ای) is a self-regulatory organization that assigns age and content ratings in Iran. The system was established in 2007 by the Iran National Foundation of Computer Games and has the status of a research project.

== Rating system ==
Icon	Rating
	Ages 3 and over
	Ages 7 and over
	Ages 12 and over
	Ages 15 and over
	Ages 18 and over

=== Content icons ===
Content icon	Description
Drugs	How much a game mentions or uses tobacco, drugs etc. Scenes that may contribute to a higher score for this Content Descriptor include the presence and use of tobacco products and drugs, as well as the frequency with which they appear or are used in the game. Families should note that, due to players' identification with the main character, the use of tobacco products or drugs by the protagonist has a greater impact and therefore results in a higher severity level for this Content Descriptor than their use by secondary or non-playable characters.
Difficulty	Difficulty of the game. Harder games get a higher score.
Fear	How much a game induces fear and paranoia in the player. Among the criteria are limitations of visibility, disturbing ambience, monsters, and sudden events. Limited visibility and darkness, ruined environments and settings, unexplained ambient sounds, encounters with various types of monsters, sudden events, and similar elements are among the factors considered when determining the intensity and potential impact of fear-inducing content on players. The repetition and variety of frightening scenes may increase the severity level assigned to the Fear descriptor. Families whose children experience persistent stress or anxiety are advised to pay particular attention to the Fear descriptor when selecting suitable games for them.
Violence	Intensity of violence in a game. Among the criteria are repetition and variety of violent scenes, the amount of blood in the game, the use of various firearms, fights, and conflicts. A higher score for this Content Descriptor indicates a greater intensity and potential impact of violent scenes on players. Factors that may contribute to a higher score include the repetition and variety of violent and brutal scenes, the amount and volume of blood depicted, the use of various types of melee and ranged weapons, and instances of one-on-one combat and physical altercations.
Profanity	Severity of profanity in a game. Among the criteria are the type and rate of repetition of profanity in the game, profane music, and profane behaviour of characters. Factors that may contribute to a higher score for this Content Descriptor include the type and frequency of inappropriate language used in the game. Disturbing or inappropriate music and socially unacceptable behavior may also increase the severity level of the Social Deviance descriptor. When inappropriate language or socially unacceptable behavior is exhibited by the main character, its potential impact on players may be greater due to the player's identification with the protagonist.
Despair	Amount of despair in a game. Among the criteria are the absurdity and aimlessness of the story, hopeless events, and tasks that make the player feel guilty. A sense of meaninglessness or lack of purpose in the game's story, discouraging events involving the protagonist, and actions or situations that may cause players to experience guilt are among the factors that can convey feelings of despair and hopelessness. The severity level of this Content Descriptor may increase or decrease depending on the intensity and prevalence of these factors throughout the game.

One of the activities carried out by the ESRA system since the beginning of the year 1395 (2016) to raise family awareness about video games is determining the severity of the impact that harmful game content can have on its audience by assigning a score to each type of content. This is communicated to families by placing content pictograms on game packaging, so that when purchasing a game they can check these pictograms to learn about the intensity of each harmful content element in that game. These pictograms, or warning signs, are as follows: Apart from the five content pictograms, there is also a pictogram called “Game Skill,” which indicates the level of skill required to play the game. Based on the score given to this pictogram, players can understand the difficulty level of the game. For instance, a game may receive a 3+ rating (suitable for all ages), meaning it contains no harmful content, yet the genre of the game might require a high level of skill and not be suitable for novice players. Using this pictogram, families can choose more appropriate games for their children and toddlers.

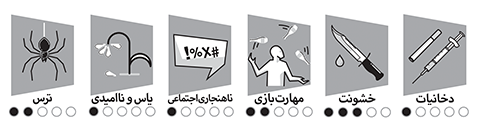
