= 1979 Revolution: Black Friday =

2016 adventure interactive drama video game

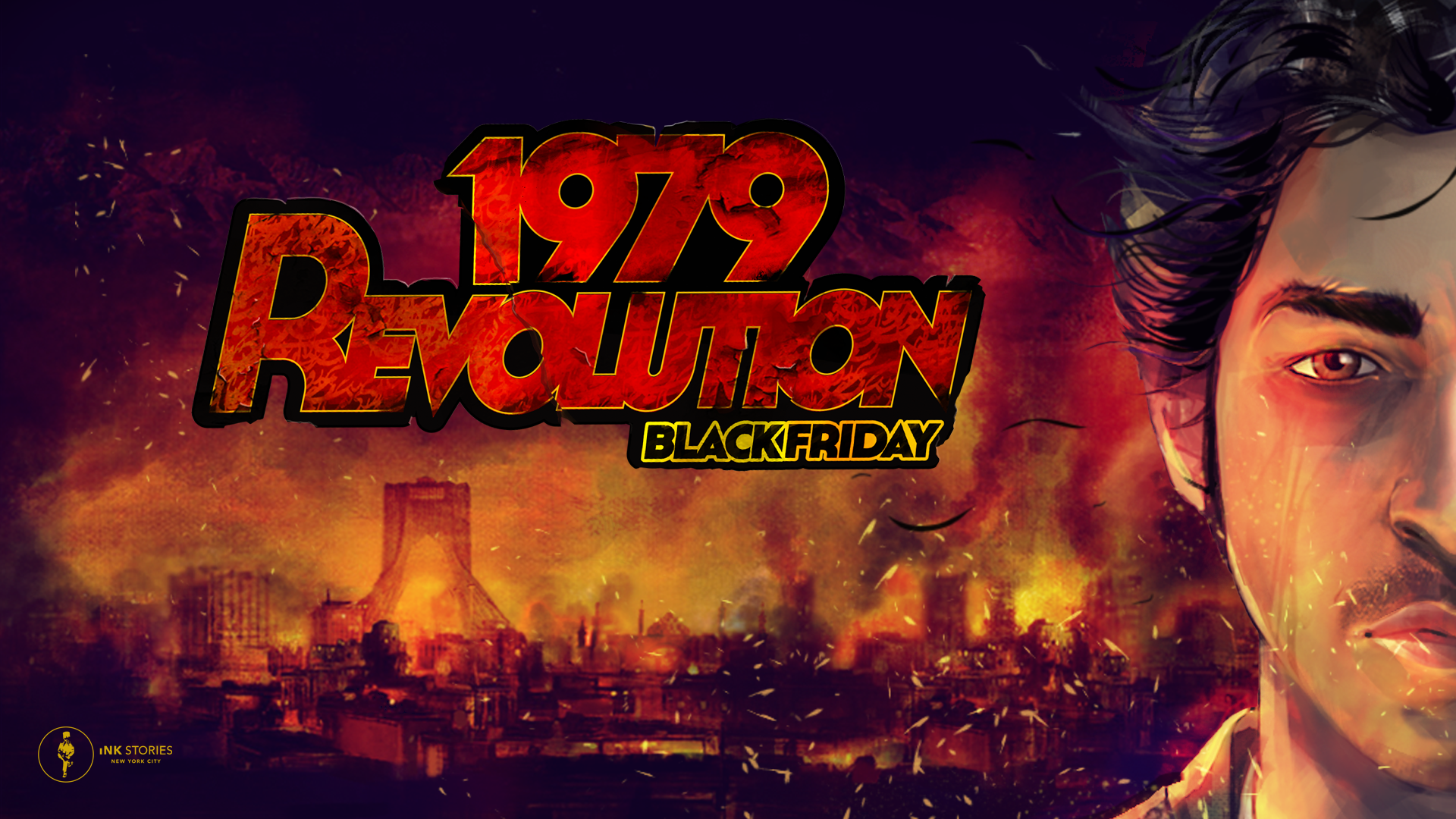
- Developer: iNK Stories
- Publisher: iNK Stories
- Director: Navid Khonsari
- Producers: Andres Perez-Duarte; Jason Schreiber; Adam Neuhaus; Navid Negahban
- Writers: Navid Khonsari; Brian Wood
- Composer: Nima Fakhrara
- Engine: Unity
- Platforms: OS X; Windows; iOS; Android; PlayStation 4; Nintendo Switch; Xbox One
- Release: April 5, 2016: OS X, Windows; April 5, 2016; iOS; June 10, 2016; Android; December 14, 2016; PlayStation 4; July 31, 2018; Nintendo Switch; August 2, 2018; Xbox One; August 3, 2018
- Genres: Adventure, interactive drama
- Mode: Single-player

1979 Revolution: Black Friday is an adventure interactive drama video game developed and published by iNK Stories, with assistance from by N-Fusion Interactive. The player controls Reza Shirazi, an aspiring photojournalist, who returns to Iran amidst the Iranian Revolution. As he becomes more involved in the events of the Revolution, Reza is forced to make decisions in order to survive. The player makes timed responses throughout the game, determining the outcome of the plot. They are tasked with taking in-game photographs of their surroundings, and given historical background of the events.

The game was in development for four years and was created to combine elements from video games and documentaries with an engaging narrative. Game director Navid Khonsari, who was a child in Iran at the time of the Revolution, developed the game with the intention of making the player understand the moral ambiguity of the situation. The development team conducted extensive research, interviewing historical scholars and Iranians who lived in Tehran during the Revolution and gathering numerous archival photos and historical speeches. Cast performances were recorded using motion capture and each character was developed with ambiguous attitudes and morals.

1979 Revolution: Black Friday was released for Android, iOS, OS X, and Windows in 2016, and for the Nintendo Switch, PlayStation 4, and Xbox One in 2018. It was well received by critics, with praise particularly directed at the narrative, characters, performances, and historical representations, though some criticism was directed at the quick-time sequences and visual quality. After an Iranian journalist labelled it propaganda, Khonsari felt afraid to reenter Iran and developers adopted aliases for protection. The game was nominated for multiple year-end accolades from several gaming publications.

== Gameplay ==
1979 Revolution: Black Friday is an adventure interactive drama video game. The player controls Reza Shirazi—an aspiring photojournalist who returns to Iran amidst the Iranian Revolution. Throughout the game, the player is presented with the ability to interact with their surroundings, including crowds of people on strike, and a homeless mother and her infant child. Upon interaction, the player is frequently prompted to take photographs of the selected person or event using Reza's camera. Menus appear on screen, comparing the in-game photograph to real images of the event taken by photographer Michel Setboun. The player also collects tapes featuring the speeches of revolutionary leader Ayatollah Khomeini.

Some moments require timed responses from the player, often leading to significant decisions that impact the story. Some conversation trees require the player to select a response within a limited time, otherwise Reza remains silent. The game requires action choices, wherein the player must decide what to do in specific circumstances; for example, one sequences tasks the player with choosing whether to take aggression during a protest, or to take photographs. Other characters will respond to the decisions accordingly, and a notification feature indicates that a character will remember the selected response. In action-based sequences, the player follows on-screen prompts for quick time events in order to stay alive. Should the player fail to follow the prompts in the allocated time, the game restarts from prior to the quick time event.

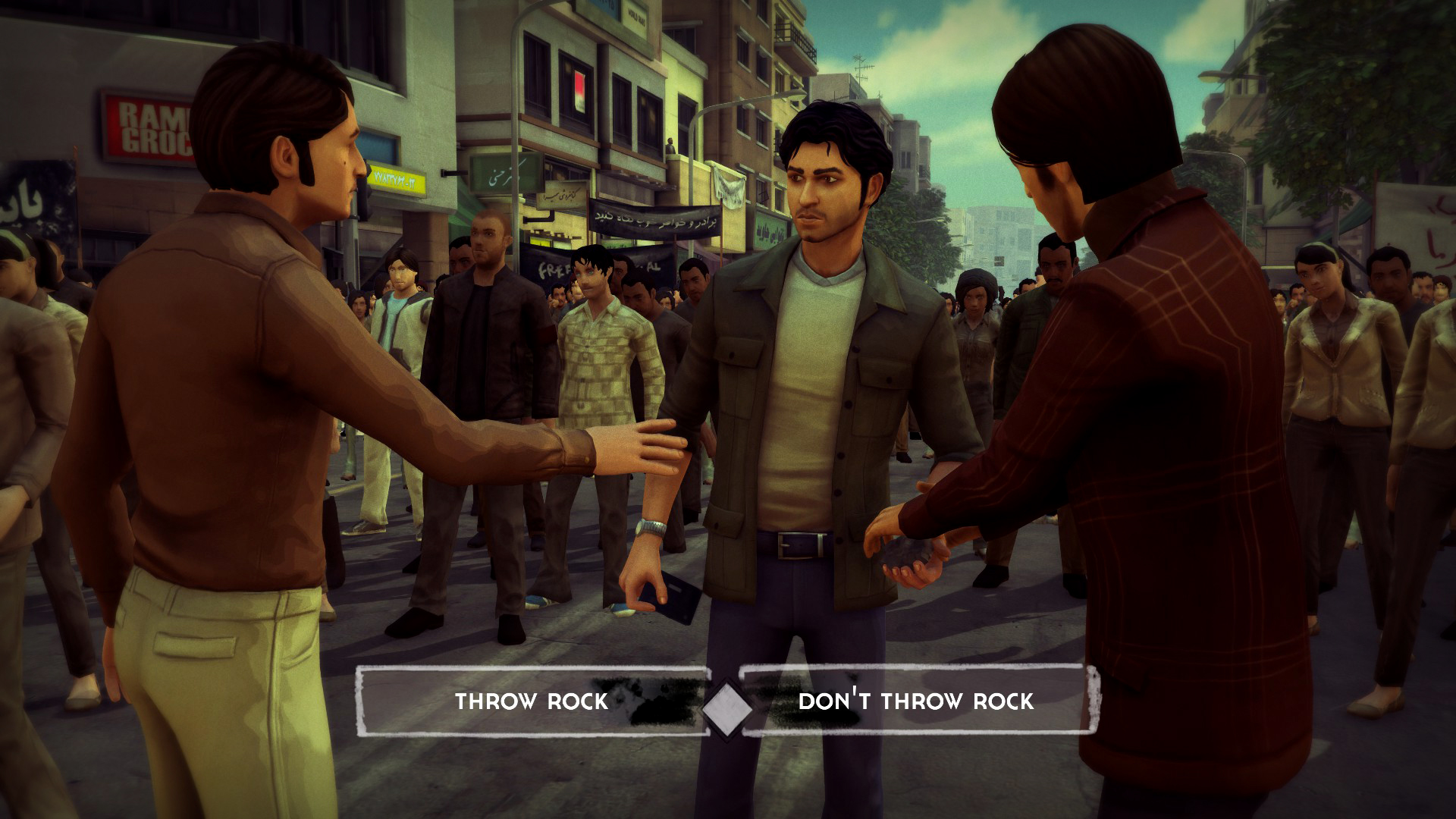
The player's dialogue and action choices determine the outcome of the narrative.

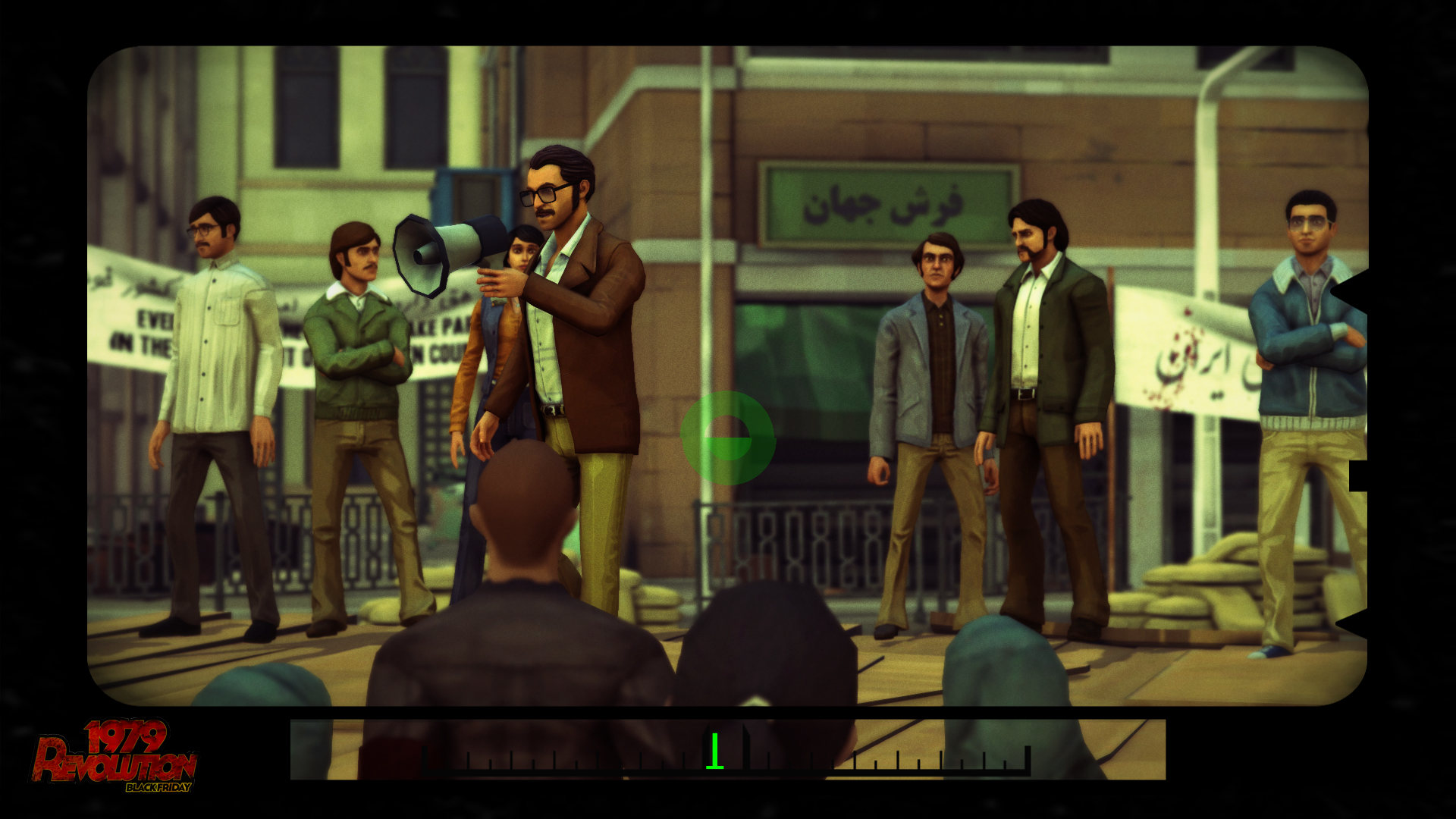
The player is tasked with capturing images of significant events with a camera.

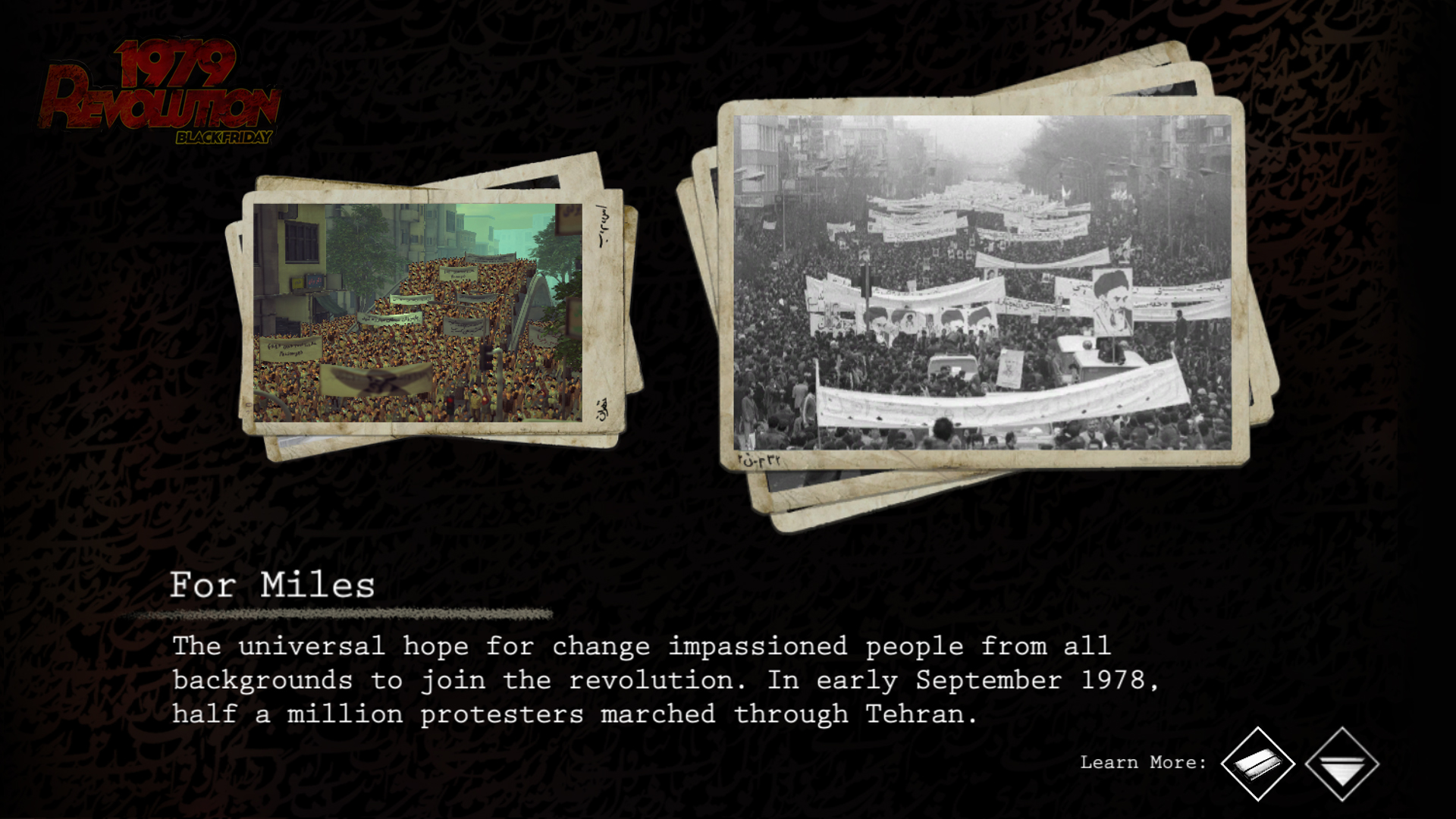
The menus provide information regarding significant events captured by the player on camera.

== Plot ==
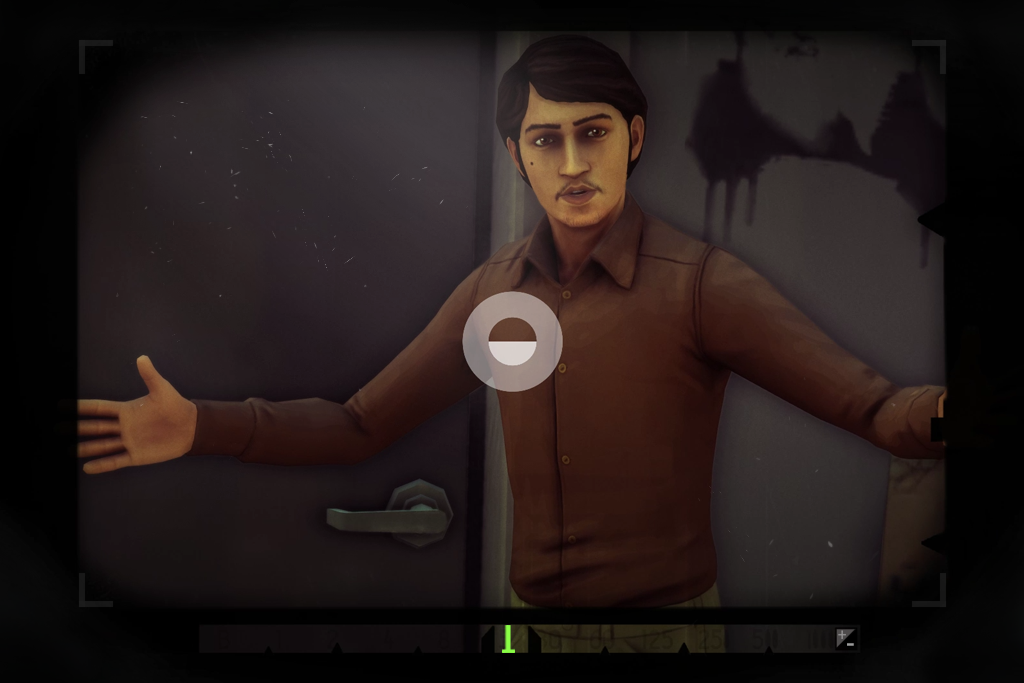
Reza's friend Babak Azadi accompanies him throughout most of the game.

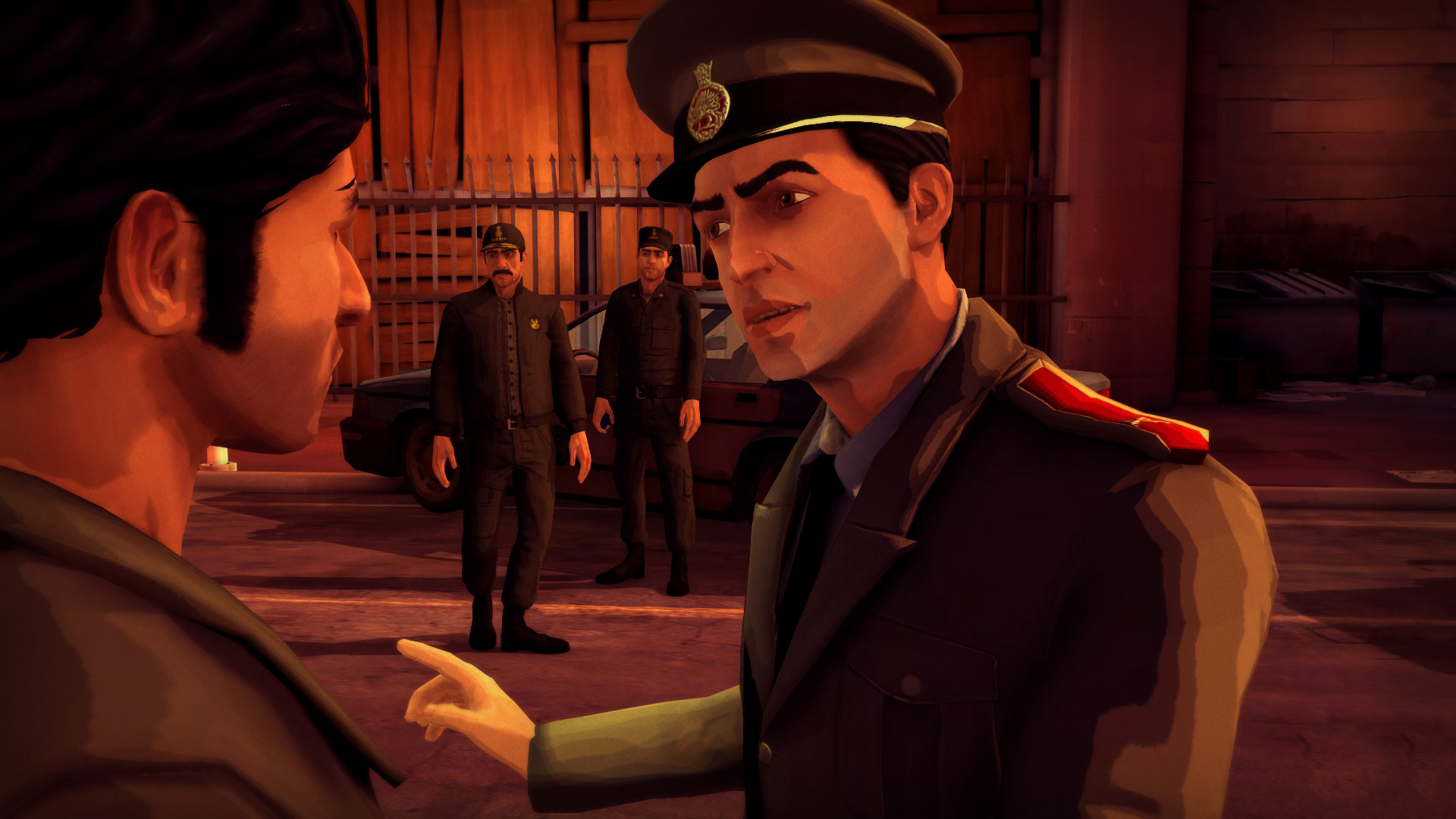
Reza's brother, Hossein Shirazi, is a police officer and uses his power to assist Reza when he gets in legal trouble.

The game opens in 1980, as aspiring photojournalist Reza Shirazi (Bobby Naderi) is ambushed at his hideout by police, and taken to Evin Prison, where he is interrogated by Asadollah Lajevardi (Navid Negahban). Reza, who was part of the Iranian Revolution in an attempt to overthrow the Shah, chooses whether or not to cooperate with Asadollah, who goes by the name of Hajj Agha.

The game cuts to September 1978, as 18-year-old Reza and his pacifist friend Babak Azadi (Omid Abtahi) watch crowds chanting about the revolution from a rooftop, and Reza takes photographs. The two then walk the streets, and arrive at a protest where revolution leaders are giving speeches. Reza's cousin Ali Shirazi (Nicholas Guilak) arrives and, when the protest is interrupted by soldiers and the crowd begins to disperse, he tries to convince Reza to throw rocks at the soldiers. Babak opposes, and Reza is left to decide whether to act aggressively and throw rocks, or act passively and voice his concerns instead. When the soldiers start threatening the crowds by firing, Reza and Babak flee into an alley, shortly followed by Ali and an injured Abbas (Ray Haratian), one of the revolution leaders who was stabbed in the commotion. After briefly being tended to, Abbas is escorted away by Ali and Bibi Golestan (Mozhan Marnò).

In a flashforward at the prison, Hajj brings out Reza's brother Hossein Shirazi (Farshad Farahat), and threatens to harm him if Reza does not cooperate and provide information about Bibi. The game returns to Reza and Babak, who arrive at the rebellion hideout. Reza meets with Abbas, who is convinced that one of the revolution leaders betrayed and stabbed him, and tasks Reza with discovering the culprit. As he is investigating, Reza is approached by some of the leaders and accused of stabbing Abbas. A brief argument ensues, but is shortly ended as police begin to ambush the hideout. Abbas hurriedly demands an answer from Reza regarding the betrayer, and Reza is forced to decide which of the revolution leaders stabbed Abbas. In a flashforward, Hajj reveals to Reza that he chose the wrong person, but they were killed shortly thereafter.

At the hideout, Reza is arrested by the police, but Hossein arrives and demands to know where Ali is located. Reza refuses to tell him, and Hossein drives him to their parents' household. The following day at a protest, Reza and Babak discover that martial law has been declared. They move to the streets and join the large crowds. Soldiers arrive and demand the crowds to disperse; when the crowds hold their ground, the soldiers begin firing at them. Reza rushes to Ali, who has been shot, and bandages his wound. Babak and Bibi help move Ali away from the commotion and into an alley, where they find Hossein. Hossein aims his gun at Ali, threatening to shoot him for his crimes, and Ali produces his gun and threatens Hossein. Reza tries to convince the two to stop, but is interrupted by firing soldiers. Reza then chooses whom to save from the gunfire: Hossein or Ali. Should Reza save Hossein, the latter is thankful and directs him to the nearest hospital; Ali dies regardless of Reza's choice. Bibi and Reza escort Babak, who was wounded in the gunfire, towards the nearest hospital, but he shortly dies of his wounds.

In a flashforward to the prison, the ending is determined based on Reza's actions to Hossein throughout the game: if Reza was unpleasant to Hossein, Hajj frees the latter, who begins to choke Reza and demands Bibi's location; if Reza was favorable to Hossein, Hajj shoots and kills the latter, before pointing the gun to Reza's head and demanding Bibi's location.

== Development ==
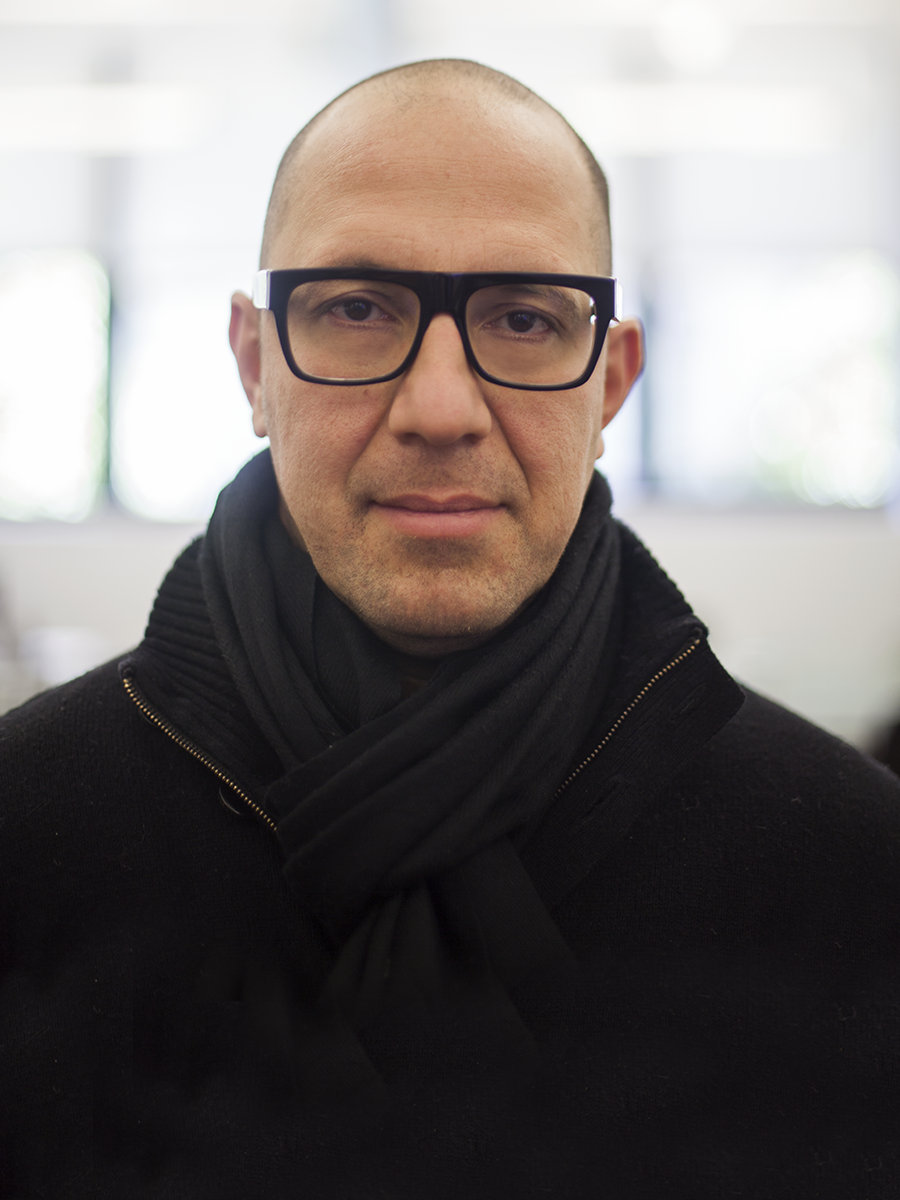
Director Navid Khonsari was a child in Iran at the time of the Iranian Revolution, witnessing many of the events that later inspired the game.

1979 Revolution: Black Friday was in development for four years; the first two years consisted of seeking money from financiers, and the game was developed over the following two years. The concept originated from a talk that director Navid Khonsari gave at the Ethical Culture Fieldston School in 2011, which involved creative stories dealing with navigating difficult ideological and social situations. The game is based on events that occurred during the Iranian Revolution, namely Black Friday. The development team coined the term "vérité game" to describe 1979 Revolution, based on the cinéma vérité style of documentary filmmaking. They consider it an interactive storytelling technique that combines elements from video games and documentaries, blending them with a flexible narrative. The team wanted to avoid the game being considered strictly educational, ensuring player entertainment and engagement was the highest priority. They also wanted to ensure that its simple gameplay would allow for both gamers and non-gamers to take part. Khonsari said that the development was the result of "a culmination of doing games, falling in love with narrative storytelling and ... fascination with documentary".

Khonsari first discussed the game in February 2011, announcing it as 1979: The Game. It was initially intended to be episodic, consisting of three or nine episodes, with Black Friday set to be the focus of the first episode, but was later reduced to one game. A crowdfunding campaign was launched on Kickstarter in 2013 with a goal of US$395,000, but failed to reach its goal, with a total of US$304,741 raised. Additional fundraising was set up on the game's website. Following the failed campaign, the team partnered with the New Frontier Story Lab at the Sundance Film Festival in 2014 and 2015, the Museum of the Moving Image in New York, and the Doris Duke Foundation for Islamic Art. It was also selected for demonstration at Sheffield Doc/Fest in 2015 as part of Interactive at Sheffield, and was playable at PAX West in 2016.

1979 Revolution was approved through Steam Greenlight in July 2015, and was released for OS X and Windows on April 5, 2016, followed by iOS devices on June 10 and Android devices on December 14, and it was released for the PlayStation 4 on July 31, 2018, Nintendo Switch on August 2, and Xbox One on August 3. Virtual reality support was planned via Oculus Rift, with an interrogation scene rewritten to fit the experience. 1979 Revolution runs on the Unity game engine. Khonsari expressed interest in a sequel, noting it depends on the game's commercial success, and in developing more games about historical events. A virtual reality companion piece to 1979 Revolution, titled Blindfold, was released for the PlayStation VR in September 2019. The player assumes the role of a photojournalist being interrogated by Lajevardi in Evin Prison.

=== Story and setting ===
Khonsari was a child in Iran at the time of the Revolution, and left the country shortly after it ended. Khonsari developed the game with the intention of making the player understand the moral ambiguity of the situation, due to the different beliefs in Iran, and to "feel the passion and the elation of being in the revolution". When the initial concept was conceived, the location of Iran had not been decided; the team was attracted to the idea of a game set during a revolution, ultimately settling on the Iranian Revolution. The team felt the chaotic environment would make the player wary of which characters to trust. When representing the concept of a revolution, the team wished to demonstrate the multiple definitions of the term. Khonsari stated that they "wanted to embrace that spirit of revolution, but we also show the trajectory of a revolution", regarding the true negative and complicated results of real revolutions.

The team interviewed a group of 40 Iranians who lived in Tehran during the Iranian Revolution. The setting and environments are based on photographs taken by real photojournalists during the era, such as Michel Setboun, and graffiti on the streets of Tehran at the time. The team also studied many documentaries, films, journals and documents regarding Iran, and sought feedback from academic, political, religious and cultural advisers. They interviewed over fifty history scholars, including sociologist and political scientist Jack Goldstone, gathered about 1,500 archival photos, and collected many of Ayatollah Khomeini's speeches during their research. The home video footage featured in the game is that of Khonsari's grandfather, recorded in Super 8 film from the 1950s to 1979. Producer Navid Negahban, who portrayed Hajj Agha in the game, was a high school student at the time of the Revolution. He said that the script "brought back memories", and he provided information to the writers based on his personal experiences of the time.

=== Character development ===
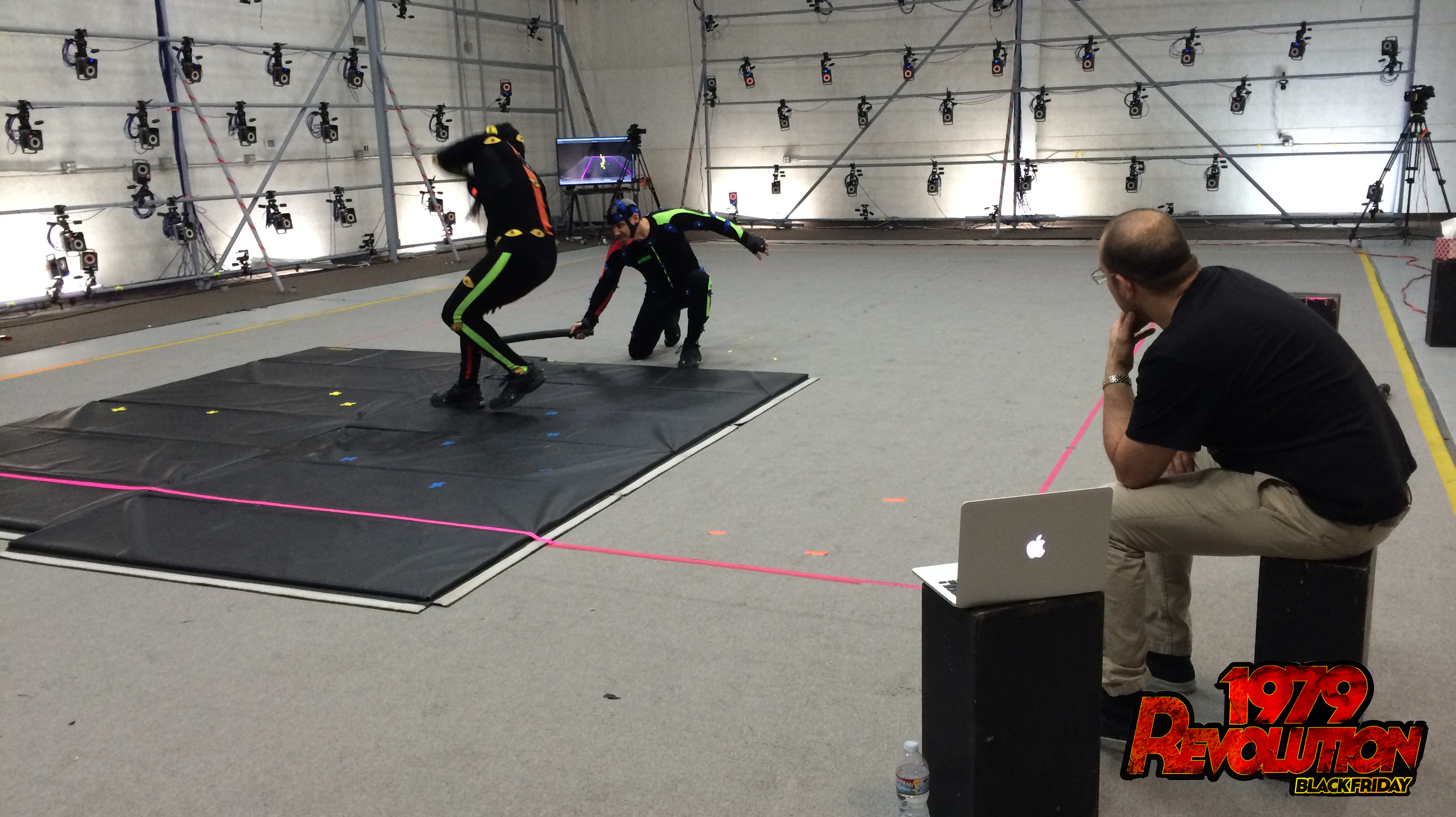
The actors performed motion capture for their roles, in addition to providing voice work.

Performances were mostly recorded using motion capture technology, with remaining audio elements recorded later in a studio. The motion capture studio—House of Moves, in Los Angeles—uses over 70 cameras, synchronized to capture the full-body motion of each actor. The 90-page script was recorded in three days of shooting on April 13–15, 2015. Khonsari, who directed the performances, shot full "master" takes in which the actors performed the entire scene without cutting; this was done to save time during production.

The game was initially set to follow the stories of eight to ten playable characters, beginning with an American-Iranian State Department translator trying to free American hostages in the Iran hostage crisis. This was later reduced to a single character: an aspiring Iranian photojournalist. Khonsari's goal was to allow the player to "see the world is a lot more gray than black and white", achieving this by having a protagonist who experienced the Revolution. The characters are based on the interviews conducted with Iranians who experienced the Revolution. Executive producer Vassiliki Khonsari said the characters "do not fall into the typical good guy/bad guy, but everyone is a shade of gray ... to show the complexity of history". The developers sought to include characters from different families, beliefs, and social classes.

Farshad Farahat, who portrayed Hossein Shirazi, was present during the 2009 Iranian protests. He appreciated the game's interactivity, and the choices that the player is forced to make. The development team felt that allowing player choice for some of the dialogue and actions allowed for a more personable experience, and for the player to connect with the story and characters. Khonsari felt that it allows for a better understanding of the events and experiences of the revolution. The team also ensured that most choices had some effect, stating "a subtle or significant decision has repercussions".

== Reception ==
=== Critical response ===
Reception

Aggregate scores
Aggregator	Score
Metacritic	(Win) 80/100 (NS) 77/100 (PS4) 70/100
OpenCritic	67% critics recommend

Review scores
Publication	Score
Game Informer	8/10
IGN	8/10
Kill Screen	75/100
Gameplanet	8/10

1979 Revolution: Black Friday received "generally favorable" reviews for Windows and Switch, according to the review aggregator website Metacritic, and "mixed or average" reviews for PlayStation 4, and 67% of critics recommended the game according to OpenCritic. Reviewers liked the narrative, characters, and historical representations, though some criticism was directed at its quick-time sequences, and visual quality. Digitally Downloaded ranked 1979 Revolution: Black Friday 38th on its list of best video games in September 2016; editor Matt Sainsbury described it as the "best example" of the medium being "used as a chronicle of critical events in human history". In June 2021, Game Rant's Erik Petrovich considered 1979 Revolution one of the best games inspired by real stories.

IGN's Chloi Rad commended the blend of drama and action, as well as the realistic depiction of violence, and felt the setting and period helped demonstrate the spirit of the revolution. Andrew Todd of Gameplanet praised the game's manner of dealing with issues like inequality, theocracy, and causes of anti-Americanism, and noted that they help create the atmosphere of the story and setting. Eurogamer's Jeffrey Matulef found the narrative's moral ambiguity refreshing, particularly the depiction of corrupting good people. He felt that the development team being primarily Iranian added to the authenticity. Kotaku's Evan Narcisse similarly appreciated the ambiguity, noting its close imitation to the era. Some critics found the choices important and scary, while others found them ultimately inconsequential.

Eurogamer's Matulef declared the characters superior and more sympathetic over those in other games, which would depict them "as cardboard henchmen or stormtroopers". IGN's Rad found the character of Reza to be likable, and Game Informer's Javy Gwaltney considered his story fascinating. The acting received praise: IGN's Rad called the performances "powerful", and Kotaku's Narcisse felt they have the ability to "pull players into the drama". Gameplanet's Todd felt the characters often "speak in exposition rather than emotion", but that "when the drama works, it really works".

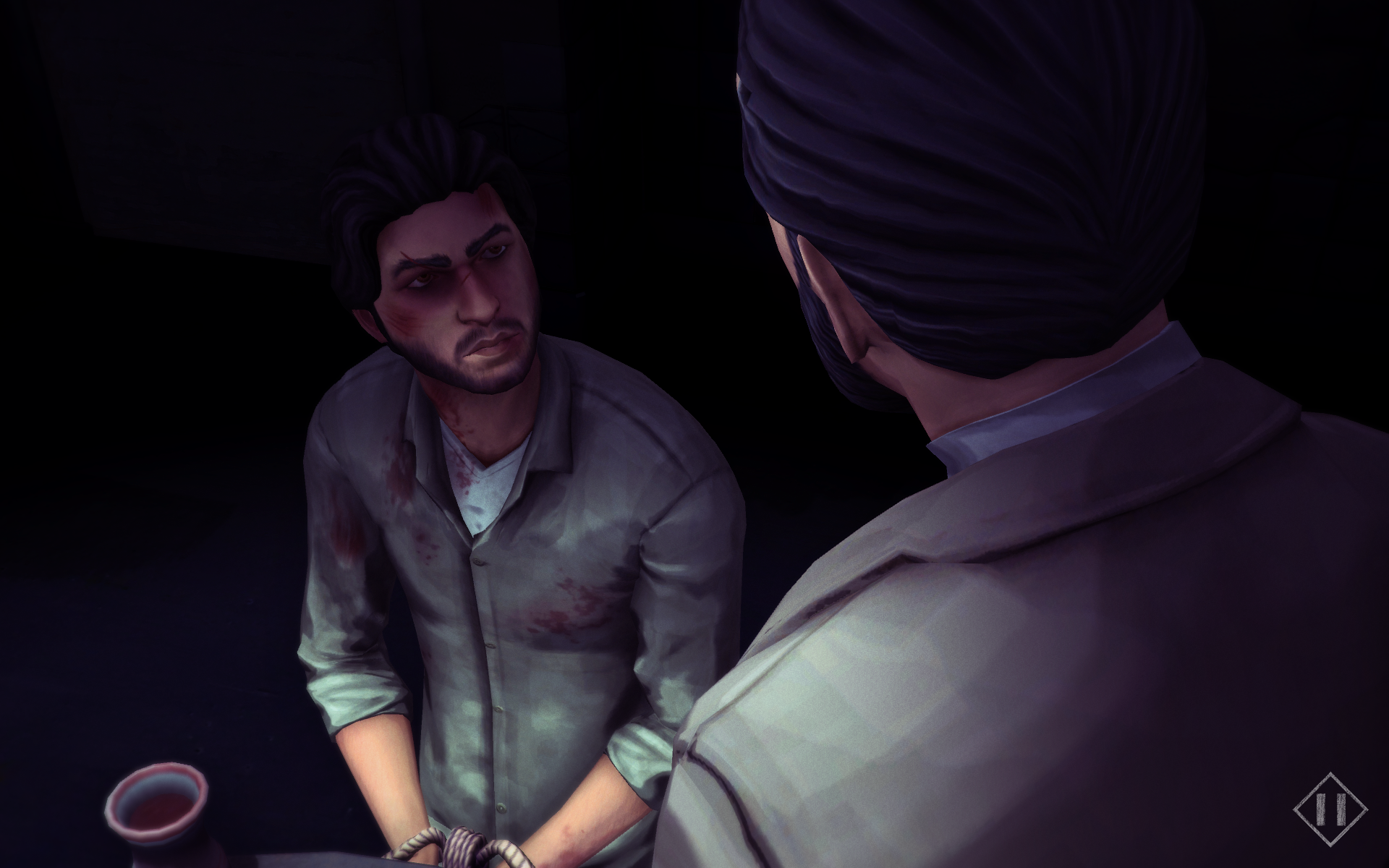
The game frequently features sequences wherein Reza is interrogated at Evin Prison by warden Asadollah Lajevardi. Journalists praised the imitation of real events.

Alexander Kriss of Kill Screen found the historical information to be "both genuinely educational but also tantalizing in their brevity", noting their reinforcement of the story's themes. IGN's Rad commended the game's ability to deliver enriching information "without bombarding" the player. Gameplanet's Todd deemed the setting of Iran "convincing and real", praising its complexity and detail, although found the density of the history somewhat overwhelming. Eurogamer's Matulef felt that the information may provide too much backstory for the characters and events, but attributed this to personal preferences.

Criticism was directed at the quick-time sequences. Kotaku's Narcisse considered them clunky, and Eurogamer's Matulef found them "poorly constructed". Game Informer's Gwaltney similarly felt them to be "shoehorned" in between dialogue encounters. Kill Screen's Kriss wrote that such sequences are featured in games like The Walking Dead (2012) to reinforce a sense of urgency in the player, but felt this was unnecessary in 1979 Revolution as "the tension already feels real enough". The visuals similarly received mixed responses: Game Informer's Gwaltney considered the art and environments "impeccable" but criticized the character models, and Eurogamer's Matulef described the graphics as "competent at best and an eyesore at worst". IGN's Rad echoed similar remarks, identifying awkward animations of background characters, and Gameplanet's Todd felt that 1979 Revolution "lacks the polish" of works by Telltale Games.

=== Political and institutional responses ===
When the game started gaining popularity in June 2012, Iranian conservative newspaper Kayhan published pieces naming it "pro-Western propaganda" and accusing Khonsari of espionage; he subsequently felt afraid to reenter the country. Some developers used aliases to protect themselves, and the concept artist fled Iran due to his involvement. Khonsari said that "anytime Iran has something written about them in the west, they feel as if it is propaganda against them." Following the game's release in 2016, the National Foundation for Computer Games (NFCG) blocked all websites distributing it in Iran and began gathering all illegally distributed copies in the country. NFCG director Hassan Karimi claimed the game had "hostile intentions and objectives" and may "poison the minds of the youth and young adults ... by means of false and distorted information". Vassiliki Khonsari attributed the ban to the game documenting history of "different ideologies, different economic classes, different social classes [coming] together to overthrow the Shah", which she described as the "gray area" that the NFCG accused of being inaccurate.

1979 Revolution was featured in a November 2016 UNESCO report by Paul Darvasi about the impact of games on learning about conflict resolution; Darvasi noted the game "might be studied to determine if [it] can be used to support the production of historical empathy, global empathy, and ethnocultural empathy, all which contribute to the acquisition and development of intercultural understanding". In 2022, a branch of Germany's Federal Agency for Civic Education critiqued the game; teacher Alexander Zart found it affected by subjective depictions due to Khonsari's significant personal background, despite its framing as an "interactive documentary".

=== Accolades ===
1979 Revolution: Black Friday received multiple nominations from gaming publications. It was nominated for Best Adventure Game from IGN at E3 2016. After its release, the game won the Grand Jury Award at IndieCade, and Best Meaningful Play at the 13th Annual International Mobile Gaming Awards. It was nominated for Games for Impact at The Game Awards 2016, for Outstanding Achievement in Game Direction and the D.I.C.E. Sprite Award at the 20th Annual D.I.C.E. Awards, and for Best Adventure Game and Best Story from IGN. It was nominated for three awards at the New York Game Awards: Big Apple Award for Best Game of the Year, Off Broadway Award for Best Indie Game, and Herman Melville Award for Best Writing. The game was nominated for Excellence in Narrative at the 19th Annual Independent Games Festival Awards, where it also received honorable mentions for Best Audio and the Seumas McNally Grand Prize; it received an honorable mention for Best Debut at the 17th Annual Game Developers Choice Awards. It won Game of the Year and Best Gameroom Game from Facebook in 2017.

Award	Date	Category	Result	Ref.
British Academy Games Awards	April 6, 2017	Performer (Navid Negahban as 'Hajj Agha')	Nominated	
D.I.C.E. Awards	February 23, 2017	D.I.C.E. Sprite Award	Nominated	
D.I.C.E. Awards	February 23, 2017	Outstanding Achievement in Game Direction	Nominated	
Game Developers Choice Awards	March 1, 2017	Best Debut (iNK Stories)	Honorable Mention	
Independent Games Festival Awards	March 1, 2017	Excellence in Narrative	Nominated	
Independent Games Festival Awards	March 1, 2017	Best Audio	Honorable Mention	
Independent Games Festival Awards	March 1, 2017	Seumas McNally Grand Prize	Honorable Mention	
International Mobile Gaming Awards	February 28, 2017	Best Meaningful Play	Won	
New York Game Awards	January 19, 2017	Big Apple Award for Best Game of the Year	Nominated	
New York Game Awards	January 19, 2017	Off Broadway Award for Best Indie Game	Nominated	
New York Game Awards	January 19, 2017	Herman Melville Award for Best Writing	Nominated	
The Game Awards	December 1, 2016	Games for Impact	Nominated	
