= Persians and I =

2003–2005 novel series by Iranian author Arman Arian

Persians and I: The Trilogy
- Author: Arman Arian
- Original title: پارسیان و من
- Cover artist: Soheil Danesh Eshraghi
- Language: Persian
- Series: 3
- Genre: Mythic fantasy, young adult fiction, mystery, thriller, bildungsroman
- Publisher: Moaj Publication House (Iran)
- Publication date: 2003-2005
- Publication place: Iran
- Media type: Print (Paper Back)
- Pages: 752
- ISBN: 978-964-5834-324

The trilogy of Persians and I (Parsian va Man, Persian: پارسیان و من) is the first modern Iranian mythical and epic fantasy series novels written by Arman Arian (Persian: آرمان آرین), a Persian author, novelist and researcher.

Since the successive release of 3 novels, 2003–2005, the trilogy has gained immense popularity, critical acclaim, and commercial success in Iran, as it became the best-selling novel in the 19th Tehran International Book Fair, 2006. In addition to many national awards, Persians and I won the International annual prize of “The Book of The Year of Iran” (2005) (Persian: کتاب سال ایران), and received the honorary diploma in the 31st IBBY World Congress in Copenhagen, Denmark (2008) by the International Board on Books for Young People the highest recognition available to creators of children's books.

This series of three books is a modern adaptation of the Shahnameh (Persian: شاهنامه), a long epic poem written by the Persian poet Ferdowsi between c. 977 and 1010 CE. Inspired by Shahname which is divided into three successive parts: the "mythical", "epic", and "historical" ages, each 3 volumes of the trilogy of Persians and I covers one of these 3 "mythical", "epic", and "historical" ages respectively. Therefore, in the first novel, Azh dahak Fortress, mythical story of Azh dahak (Zahhak), in the second novel, the Mystery of the Bird Mountain, the epic story of Rostam, and in the third novel, Here comes the Resurrection Day, the historical story of Cyrus the Great, the King of Achaemenid Empire are being told respectively.

Each novel of the trilogy of Persians and I narrates a separated story with its own closed ending. However, these 3 stories integrate at the end of the third book and reach to the final climax of the trilogy. the protagonist in each part of this trilogy is a lonely teenage boy separated from his family. He travels from the present into the past in adventurous journey through Persian mythology, epics and history. After the long adventurous journey of Fighting against injustice and evil, eventually, at the end of the third novel, the 3 boys Ardeshir, Siavash, and Bardiya join other young people from different countries to create a world full of joy and beauty.

== Awards ==
- Winner of the honorary diploma in the 31st IBBY World Congress in Copenhagen, Denmark by the International Board on Books for Young people 2008, for the book the Persian and I.
- The annual prize of “The Book of The Year of the Islamic Republic of Iran” was featured as the youngest recipient of this prestigious prize since its establishment in 1955, 2005.
- The annual prize of -“Mehrgan e Adab” for writers and publishers, 2005
- The annual book prize of -“Ghani pour” 2005.
- The annual prize of -“Mehrgan e Adab” for writers and publishers2006.
- The annual prize by The Children's Book Council of Iran 2006.

== Synopsis ==
=== Azh dahak Fortress ===
Persians and I:Azh dahak Fortress
- Author: Arman Arian
- Publication date: 2003
- Pages: 224
- ISBN: 978-964-5834-126

Ardeshir is a modern-day teenager who lives with his author parents in a faraway hut, in a green jungle. But when winter comes, everything becomes messed and some men invade them to destroy the hand scripts of the father. This invasion results in the destruction of the hand scripts and the death of Ardeshir's parents, but Ardeshir miraculously enters the era of his father's book: The age of myths and the ancient times of the Iranians at the dawn of the man's history. He enters the age of Zahhak the serpent shoulders and finds out that he has joined the assembly of the Persians, led by Kaveh the blacksmith, on the thirteenth of Farvardin, (Sizdah Be-dar) .Much to his surprise, Ardeshir finds out that his own father (who was killed earlier) is one of the warriors and commanders of Fereydun's revolutionary army.

Sometime later, following the increase in the flames, the revolutionaries invade the town and Freidoun's arriving makes Zahhak to escape. The revolutionaries go after him until the final battle takes place at serpent shoulder's northern palace. Freidoun prevails and Zahhak is put in fetters inside of a cave in the Mount Damavand and left to suffer the fangs of the serpents on his own shoulders and perish. In the meantime Zahhak's sinister vizier named Arikshad who is probably the Ahriman himself _and responsible for much of Zahhak's crime_ is wounded in this battle and vanishes...

Many people get killed during this last battle, and Ardeshir is one of them! Ardeshir returns to the present time and finds out that the faceless ones _the ones who killed his parents_ are dead and fallen on the snow. Everything is surrounded by a splendid ambiguity and there the story ends in a shadow of vagueness (until Ardeshir's condition be clear at the end of the trilogy).

=== Mystery of the Bird Mountain ===
Persians and I:Mystery of the Bird Mountain
- Author: Arman Arian
- Publication date: 2004
- Pages: 288
- ISBN: 978-964-5834-188

Siavash is a fourteen-year-old teenager, working as a mechanic's mate and living with his step parents near a road in a desert. However a strange event changes his life and that event is the arrival of an old blind sorcerer named Mago. Mago buys Siavash from his cold-hearted parents, pretending that he wants him as his servant, but in fact wanting Siavash to gain access to a treasure for him, and the two set out in the heart of the desert and after days of exhausting traveling by foot, they reach a mountain in the shape of a giant bird, deep in the desert.

On Mago's order, Siavash who has also been aware of some of his formidable powers, enters the dangerous path of the bird's throat in order to take the book of life. The path opens every 20 years, blinding the trespassers. Mago too has been blinded 20 years before in the same way.

Siavash enters with caution, but when facing the incredible book and through its words he finds out that he shouldn't give the book to the sorcerer. Therefore, according to the instructions of the book, he touches two pages of the book and floats in its spaces... ... Now he is prince Siavash, the son of the ancient king of Iran's age of epics, Kay Kavus ! He wakes up in the palace and finds himself in the world of the living epics. From then on, he accompanies Rostam, the great hero and defender of Iran in that era, through Rostam's Seven Labours. Their journey ends when Rostam gets killed by his step brother Shaghad. In his last moments, Rostam kills the dastard brother and Siavash who has lost his protector is saved by Simurgh and they travel through time and return to the cave of the book of life in the bird mountain at the present time!

=== Here comes the Resurrection Day ===
Persians and I:Here comes the Resurrection Day
- Author: Arman Arian
- Publication date: 2005
- Media type: Print (Paper Back)
- Pages: 240
- ISBN: 978-964-5834-294

Bardia is a fifteen-year-old teenager who has been born into a reach family, his mother has died and his father lives in Europe with another woman. Bardia lives with his nanny and their caretaker in a quiet and lonesome mansion in Tehran. Finally he sets out for Europe by the order of his father to continue his studies and life there but the crashing of the airplane on which he is flying, on the mountain chain of Alborz, changes his destiny.

the lonely and injured Bardia is saved by Simurgh and carried to the ancient time of Achaemenid Empire, when Cyrus the Great has begun to rule. Now he is prince Bardia, King Cyrus's second son, and he is also contemporary to the young Darius _the future Darius the great _ who is his cousin. Bardia starts his adventures journey with Darius in order to reach his father and attends in the peaceful conquest of Babylon.

Bardia's adventurous journey finishes by his death and all the three protagonists of the trilogy Persians and I, among thousands of girls and boys, each having passed a course, enter the resurrection day to put an end to a dark and evil era and bring a beginning for a peaceful glorious new age.
