= Garshasp: The Monster Slayer =

2011 video game

- Cover art as shown on GamersGate
- Developers: Fanafzar Sharif Co. Dead Mage Inc.
- Publishers: Loh Zarrin Nikan (Iran); Just a Game (outside Iran)
- Designers: Hossein Hosseinian; Hadi Eskandari
- Programmers: Amir-Hossein Fassihi (lead); Yaser Zhian; Faham Negini; Aidin Zolghadr
- Artists: Soheil Danesh-Eshraghi (lead); Syros Pourlatifi; Mohammad Modarres; Peyman Masoudi
- Writer: Arman Arian
- Engine: Proprietary (build on top of OGRE 3D, PhysX, OpenAL)
- Platform: Microsoft Windows
- Release: Microsoft Windows; 8 May 2011 (download); 31 May 2011 (retail)
- Genres: Action-adventure, hack and slash
- Mode: Single-player

Garshasp: The Monster Slayer is a 2011 action-adventure video game developed by Fanafzar Sharif Studios and Dead Mage Inc. for Microsoft Windows. The story and the game are based on the adventures of the mythological Persian monster slayer Garshasp. A standalone expansion pack, Garshasp: Temple of the Dragon, was released in 2012.

Garshasp was released for Windows independently online on 8 May 2011, and was released through the Steam and GamersGate services a day later. Upon release, the game received mixed reviews, although it was praised as an ambitious endeavor for an independent developer.

== Gameplay ==
Garshasp: The Monster Slayer is a third-person action-adventure / hack and slash game taking place in mythological ancient Persia, in a world occupied by monsters and Deevs. The game focuses mainly on combat with large weapons and heavy combo moves. Platforming and puzzle solving also play a major role in the game play style.

Garshasp has the ability to jump, double jump, and dodge as well as perform light and heavy attacks. These attacks can be executed in certain orders allowing for several different maneuvers which vary in combat strength and character animation. As the game progresses Garshasp can also accumulate further levels of experience which can further unlock new attacks.

The more attacks the player engages in also subsequently raises Garshasp's rage meter, enabling the player to execute stronger combos. Garshasp can also dispatch weaker enemies through an action resulting in an instant kill, which is useful for dispatching large numbers of enemies. Stronger foes can also be felled in this manner, although they first must be weakened by conventional attacks.

Damage to the player may be healed by various blue orbs mounted on pedestals that are scattered throughout the game environment. There are also red orbs that can grant the player experience boosts. The game offers no external control of the camera view, with the game itself programmed to orient the world based on the current action or event taking place.

The games puzzle solving element mostly consists of the player opening new areas by hitting switches or levers as well as several environmental challenges, including several scenes where Garshasp must use his sword to assist in a controlled descent down a vertical surface, as well as more traditional platformer elements.

== Plot ==
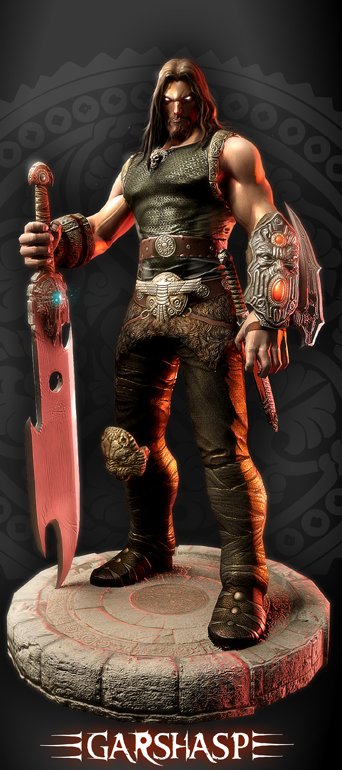
Promotional art showing the main character

Years after the confinement of Azhi Dahaka (Zahhak) by Fereydun in Mount Damavand, the evil Deevs who were the commanders in the army of darkness led by Azhi Dahaka rose again in different parts of the ancient lands of Khunirath and rebelled against the humans who were celebrating the victory of the army of light. Each Deev formed a colony of its own and continued on bringing suffering to the human race.

Hitasp, the Golden Crown, who possessed numerous deadly magical skills, was among these Deevs and was seeking to build up its empire in the rocky lands of Faranbagh in Hara Berezaiti. Siavoshgard, the legendary village that had been the home of many Pahlavan, was raided by Hitasp and his followers and in the battle, Garshasp's brother, Oroxia, was killed while defending his ancestral home.

Garshasp, the monster slayer and a grand son of Jamshid, starts out pursuing revenge for his brother's blood by a journey towards the Hitasp's stronghold only to find out that something much more important has been taken in the raid of Siavoshgard and Garshasp's bravery is to play a big role in the destiny of the world...

== Development ==
Development on the game took place over three years originally by a team of Iranian developers under the name of Fanafzar Sharif Game Studios. Fanafzar used mainly free software tools to develop Garshasp, including the OGRE engine, OpenAL library, Boost C++ Libraries, and WxWidgets. Development on the game was later moved out of Iran, with the game being completed by the Texan studio Dead Mage where the members of the original team moved. The game was unveiled with its new title, Garshasp: The Monster Slayer, in April 2011.

The game was released online for Microsoft Windows on 8 May 2011 and was made available through the Steam and GamersGate services on 9 May 2011. The developers stated plans to port the game to Linux and also considered a port to the Xbox Live Arcade. At the time of release, it was the most expensive video game to have been developed in Iran.

== Reception ==
Reception

Aggregate scores
Aggregator	Score
GameRankings	49.67% (PC)
Metacritic	49 (PC)

Review scores
Publication	Score
Destructoid	3.5/10
GameSpot	5.0/10
IGN	5/10

Garshasp: The Monster Slayer received a rating of 5.0/10 from IGN. Comparing it to God of War, the reviewer noted that the game has "less of everything that makes the series cool". GameSpot gave the game a rating of 5.0, stating that the game demonstrates "impressive feats for a $19.99 independent release" but also commenting that its "price is attached to a four-hour game that only partially makes good on its potential." Rock, Paper, Shotgun commented that Dead Mage had "obviously worked hard to get the game to this level" and that they "like the way the game is themed and presented", but also complained that it is "the kind of game that ends up looking weak by comparison to its high-budget peers."

Honest Gamers gave the game 2 out of 5 stars, defending the low rating by saying that the game has "unfortunate flaws, existing to regularly remind you that you wasted both time and money when you invested in the disappointing adventure that unfolds." Patch Media reviewed the game with a 6.5/10 score, stating that "it might be worth waiting for one of the sales before picking up this title, but despite its weaknesses, Garshasp is a boon to the independent gaming scene."

Digitally Downloaded enjoyed the game, but stressed the need for a gamepad or similar console-styled controller, saying that it "really deserves to be played on a format that this kind of game was custom built for."
