= Navid Khonsari =

Iranian-Canadian video game director

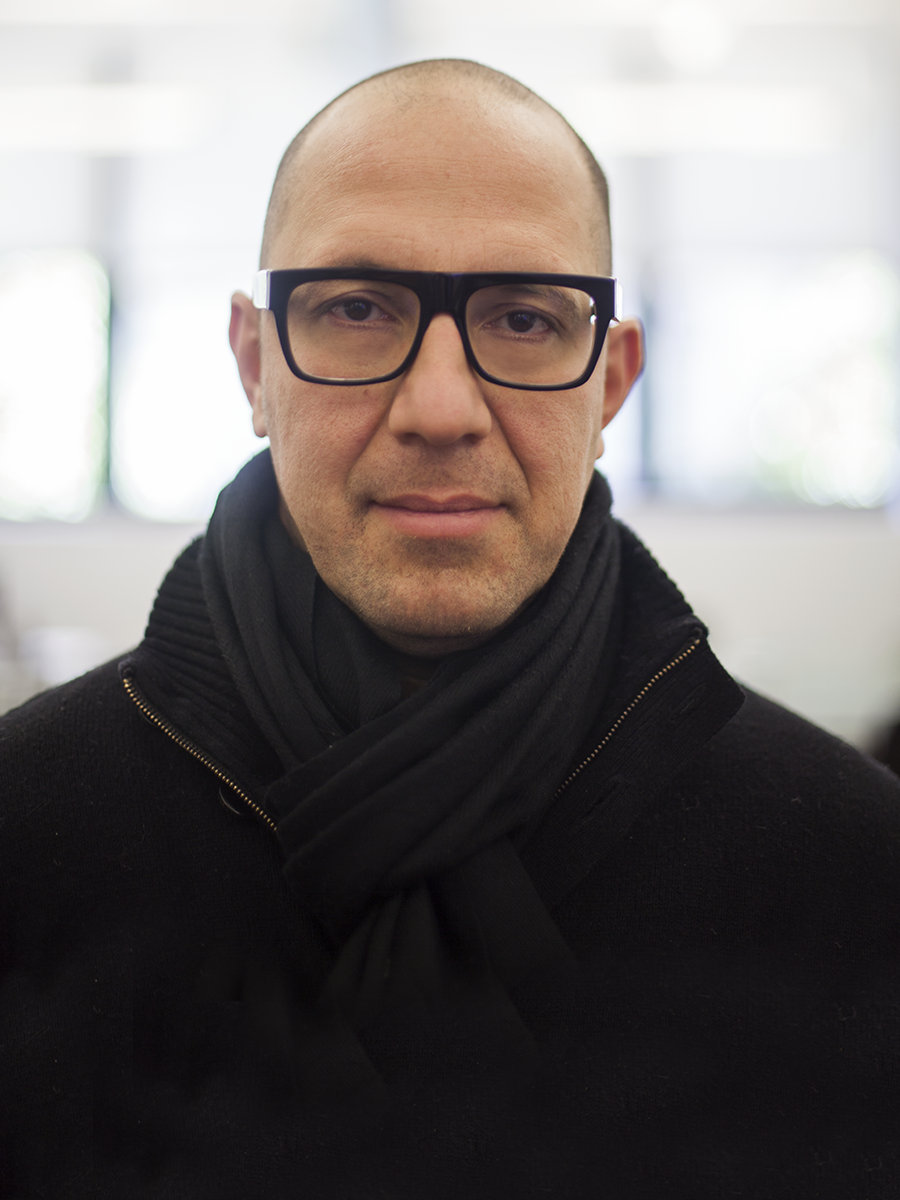
- Khonsari in 2014
- Born: 1970 (age 55–56); Imperial State of Iran
- Education: University of British Columbia; Vancouver Film School
- Occupations: CEO, Creator of 1979 Revolution: Black Friday, writer, director, producer
- Organization: iNK Stories
- Spouse: Vassiliki Bessie Khonsari
- Website: Company Website

Navid Khonsari (Persian: نوید خونساری) (born 1970) is an Iranian-Canadian video game, virtual/mixed reality, film and graphic novel creator, writer, video game developer, director, and producer.

Khonsari worked on several games at Rockstar Games, including Grand Theft Auto III and Max Payne. He is the co-founder of iNK Stories, a video game development studio responsible for 1979 Revolution: Black Friday and Lili, which world premiered its prequel at Cannes 2025, the first video game ever in competition at Cannes. He is an adjunct professor at Johns Hopkins University.

== Early life ==
Khonsari was raised in his homeland Iran until 10. He fled Iran as a political refugee to Canada after the 1979 Revolution with his family. He graduated from the University of British Columbia and the Vancouver Film School.

== Career ==
His first short film was titled Arcade Angels, which focused on video game burnouts who robbed a video rental store in an attempt to open an arcade. He wrote and produced The Contract, his first film with Billy Dee Williams.

Khonsari's first video game work was Grand Theft Auto III and Max Payne, after joining Rockstar Games in 2000. During his five years at Rockstar, Khonsari was the cinematic director and built the production pipeline on Grand Theft Auto III, Vice City, Grand Theft Auto: San Andreas, Max Payne, Max Payne 2: The Fall of Max Payne, Midnight Club II, Manhunt, Red Dead Revolver, Midnight Club 3: DUB Edition, The Warriors, Grand Theft Auto: Liberty City Stories and Grand Theft Auto: Vice City Stories. Khonsari worked with Capcom on Resident Evil 7: Biohazard.

He left Rockstar and has since worked on a number of games including Alan Wake and Homefront. He met his wife, Vassiliki, while directing the documentary Pindemonium, where she acted as the cinematographer and producer. Together, Navid and Vassiliki co-founded iNK Stories and produced another documentary, Pulling John, which premiered at South by Southwest and streamed on Netflix. In 2016, iNK Stories released 1979 Revolution: Black Friday.

The game received several awards and was recognized by UNESCO as a digital solution for peaceful conflict resolution; Khonsari was politically exiled by the government of Iran, deemed a US spy. Khonsari's subsequent projects include: HERO, a site-specific multi-sensory VR experience of civilian warfare in Syria, which premiered at Sundance and Tribeca Film Festival and won the Storyscape Award for Best Immersive; Blindfold, which premiered at Sheffield; and Fire Escape, premiering at Tribeca. Lili stars Zar Amir and is a co-production with the Royal Shakespeare Company and Alambic Productions. It is a neo-noir adaptation of Macbeth set in Iran and is currently in development as a film and a video game. The prequel world premiered at Cannes in 2025 as the first video game ever in competition and at Venice International Film Festival in 2025.

Khonsari is a juror and a member of the Peabody Interactive Board for the Peabody Awards.

== Works ==
- Lili (Expected release 2027)
- Lili 'PREQUEL' (2025)
- MindsEye (2025)
- Hero (2018)
- Fire Escape (2018)
- Resident Evil 7: Biohazard (2017)
- Blindfold (2017)
- 1979 Revolution: Black Friday (2016)
- Homefront (2011)
- Alan Wake (2010)
- Grand Theft Auto: Vice City Stories (2006)
- Grand Theft Auto: Liberty City Stories (2005)
- The Warriors (2005)
- Grand Theft Auto: San Andreas (2004)
- Max Payne 2: The Fall of Max Payne - A Film Noir Love Story (2003)
- Midnight Club 3: DUB Edition (2005)
- Red Dead Revolver (2004)
- Manhunt (2003)
- Midnight Club II (2003)
- Grand Theft Auto: Vice City (2002)
- Grand Theft Auto III (2001)
- Max Payne (2001)
