= Heroic Age =

Heroic Age may refer to:

== Periods of time ==
- British Heroic Age, 4th to 7th centuries AD, the period in the years after the departure of Roman military forces from Britain and before Anglo-Saxon (and ultimately Norman) dominance over much of the island of Britain; defined by a recentering of Celtic culture, including the bardic system of poetry in homage to local warlords, and the appearance of early Welsh language texts. This is the era in which the King Arthur myth emerges, along with other figures who would later partake in this mythological system (including the bard Taliesin).
- Greek Heroic Age, in Greek mythology, the period at which semi-divine and human heroes are supposed to have lived, between the coming of the Greeks to Thessaly and the Greek return from Troy. Considered one of the Five Ages of Man.
- Germanic Heroic Age, 4th and 5th centuries AD, period of early historic or quasi-historic events reflected in Germanic heroic poetry.
- Heroic Age of Antarctic Exploration, from 1895–1917, when the Antarctic continent was a focus of international efforts towards exploration.
- Heroic Age of Medicine, c. 1780 – 1850, when aggressive medical techniques were used. See Heroic medicine.

== Literature and published works ==
- Heroic Age (literary theory) postulated by some scholars of oral and traditional literature, as a stage in the development of human societies likely to give rise to legends about heroic deeds
- Heroic Age (TV series), an anime series produced by Xebec in 2007
- Heroic Age (comics), a Marvel Comics storyline which began in 2010
- The Heroic Age (journal), an academic journal published since 1999 and dedicated to Northwestern Europe during the early medieval period, from the early 4th through 13th centuries
- The Heroic Age of American Invention, 1961 children's science book
- "The Heroic Age" is a book by Stratis Haviaras, about a group of children aged six to fourteen (the heroic age) which are refugees of the Greek Civil War
