= Grand Mosalla of Isfahan =

Mosque in Isfahan, Iran

- مصلای امام خمینی اصفهان
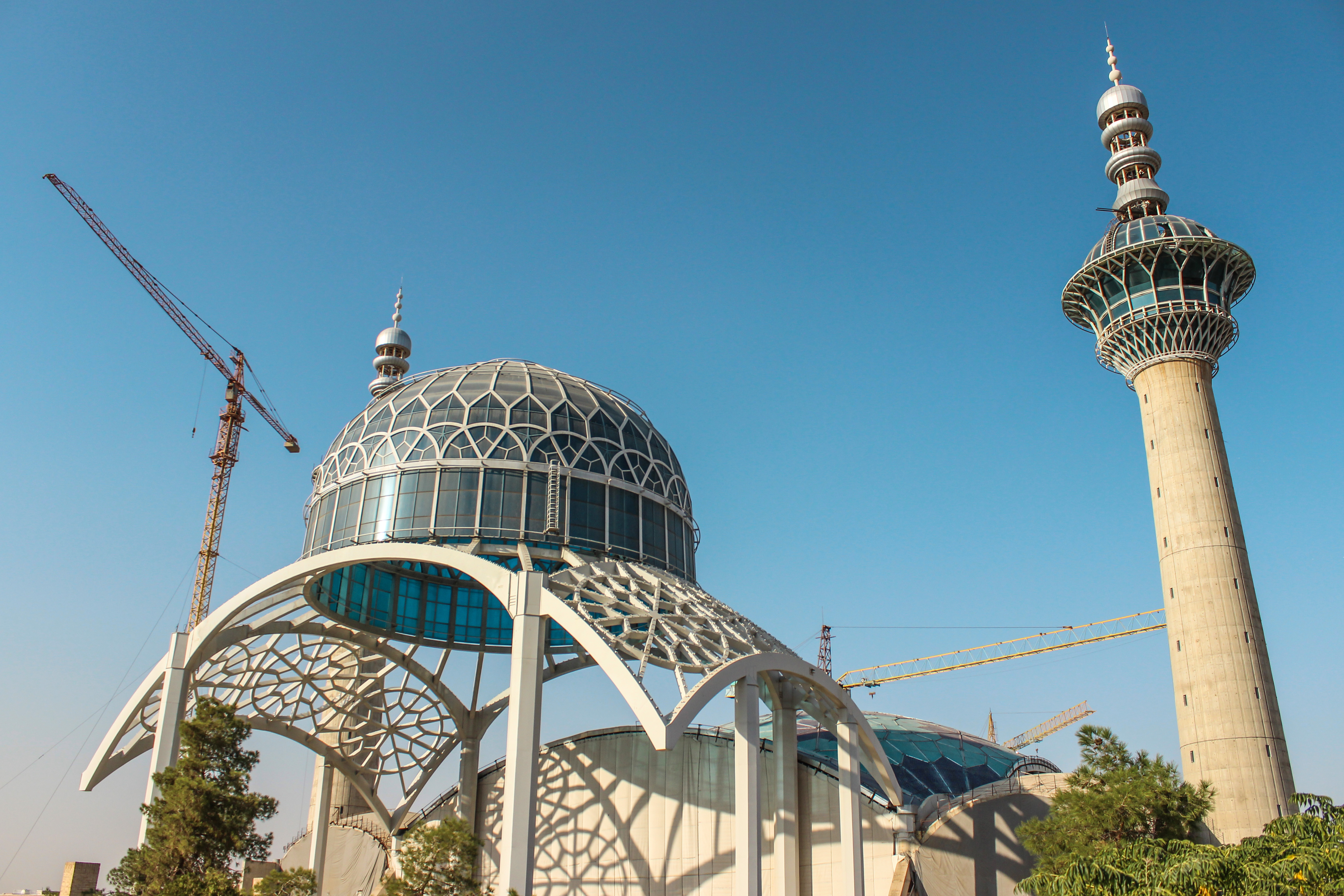
- The mosque in 2018

Religion
- Affiliation: Shia Islam
- Ecclesiastical or organizational status: Friday mosque; Community center
- Status: Active
- Named in honor of: Ruhollah Khomeini

Location
- Location: Isfahan, Isfahan Province
- Interactive map of Grand Mosalla of Isfahan
- Coordinates: 32.6280361°N 51.6773972°E

Architecture
- Type: Mosque architecture
- Style: Persian-Islamic

Specifications
- Dome: One
- Minaret: Two
- Minaret height: 60 m (200 ft)
- Materials: Concrete

The Grand Mosalla of Isfahan, officially the Imam Khomeini Mosalla of Isfahan (Persian: مصلای امام خمینی اصفهان), is a Shi'ite Friday mosque (jāmeh) and associated community complex, located in the city of Isfahan, in the province of Isfahan, Iran. The mosque is used for hosting weekly Friday prayer (jāmeh), as well as cultural, political, educational, worship activities, including book fairs, exhibitions, and religious ceremonies. The mosque is located in close proximity to the Takht-e Foulad historical cemetery.

The musalla consists of various sections, including:

- shabestan: 60 x 160 meters in size, including two 60 x 60 meter domed roofs and two 60 x 20 meter domes with a metal structure weighing 2,000 tons and fiberglass joinery
- minarets: Two main minarets with a concrete body 60 meters high, a metal section and decorative elements on it with a total height of about 110 meters on both sides of the maqsurah in the southern section and 6 concrete minarets
- maqsurah: located in the southern section and made of iron sheet
- porticos: Around the shabestan, which is made of twenty one 20 x 20 meter domes made of concrete

Next to this musalla, there is a historical shabestan dating back to the Safavid-Qajar period. This work was registered within the Iran National Heritage List on 1 June 2003 with registration number 9075.

== Gallery ==
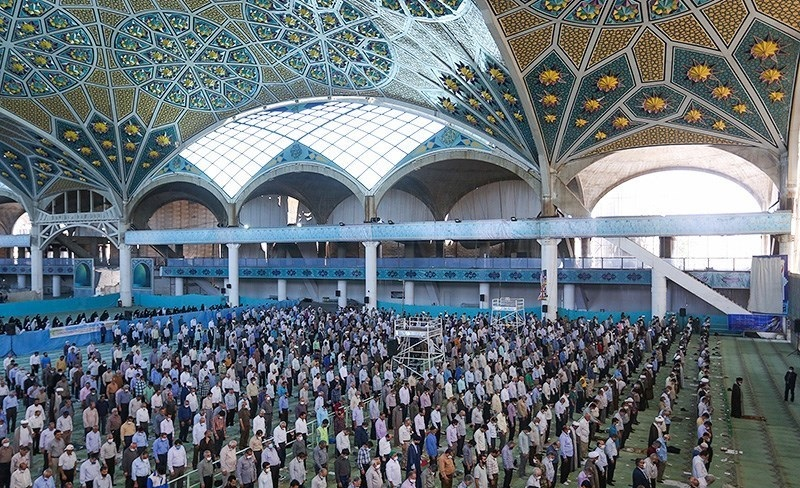

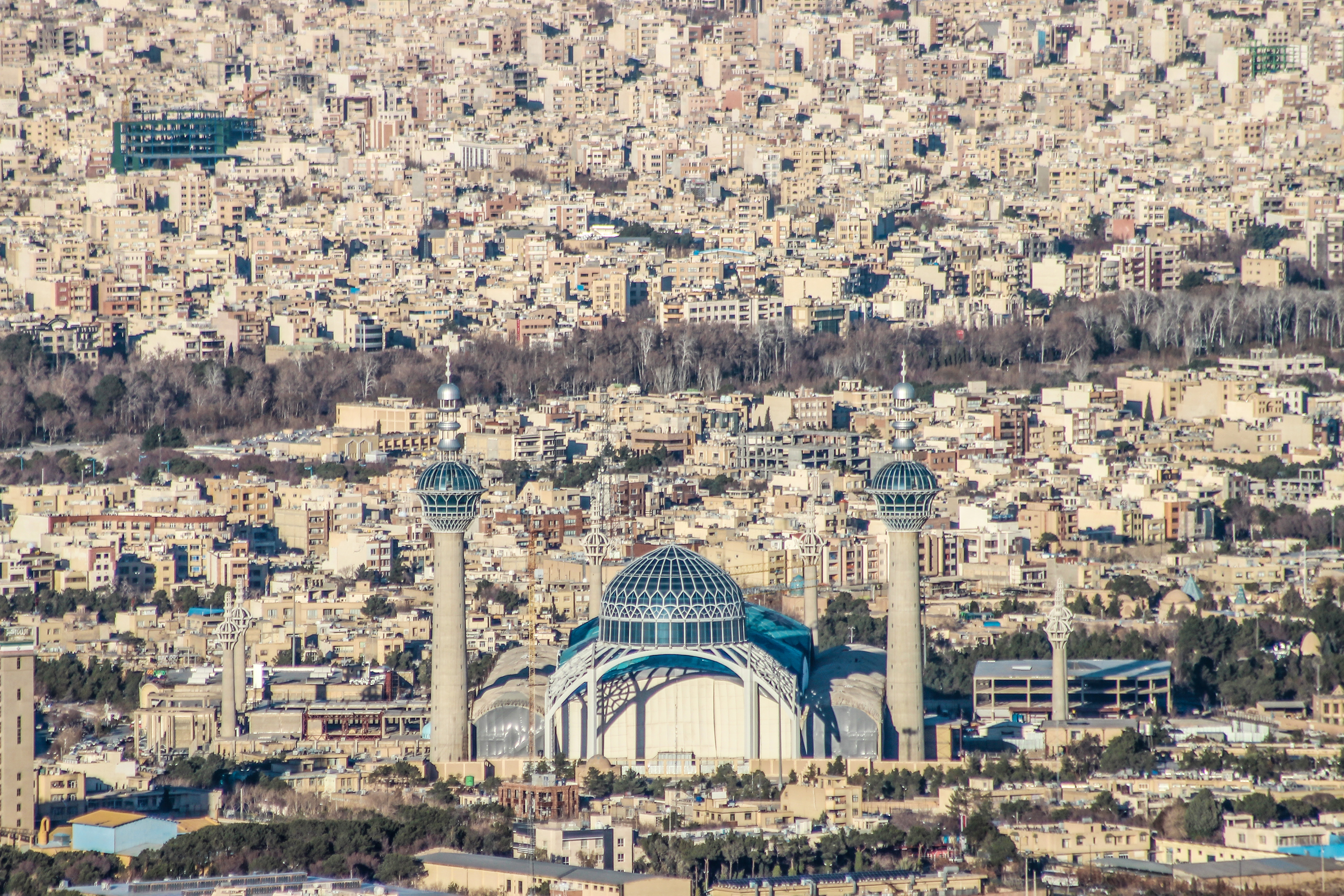

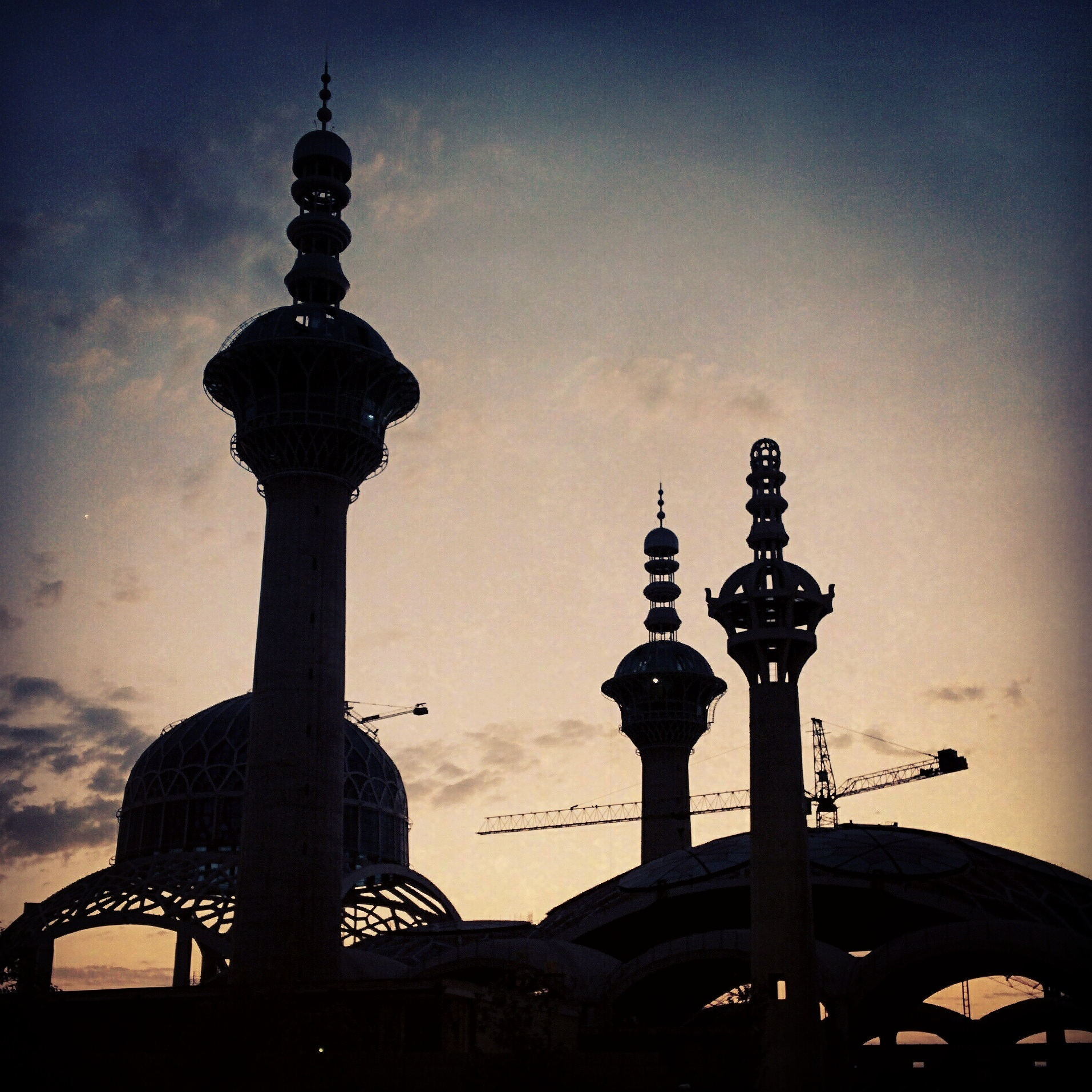

== See also ==
- Shia Islam in Iran
- List of mosques in Iran
- Jamaran Hussainiya, house of Ruhollah Khomeini
- Mausoleum of Ruhollah Khomeini
