= Game Connection =

- Status: Active
- Genre: B2B convention
- Locations: Paris (France) & San Francisco (CA - USA)
- Inaugurated: 2001
- Major events: Business - Conferences - Networking
- Organizer: Connection Events
- Website: www.game-connection.com

Game Connection is a business convention of the video games industry. It is an international marketplace for game developers, service providers and publishers looking to expand their network and find the right business partners.

== History ==
The Game Connection history began in 2001, when Pierre Carde, former Director of Lyon Game and now CEO of Connection Events, decided to set up a convention for the gaming industry with the objective of doing business.

The first convention took place in Lyon in December 2001 and attracted 27 French developers and 20 international publishers. From that moment on, Game Connection Europe brought together an increasing number of companies, representing today a total of about 45 countries. This success led Game Connection to sign a partnership with the Game Developers Conference in 2004, a deal which brought the convention to the Silicon Valley, giving birth to Game Connection America. Since then, California became the second location of Game Connection, at first welcoming the event in San Jose and then in San Francisco.

Today Game Connection is no longer affiliated with GDC for its American edition, but it continues to grow in terms of participants. This pushed Connection Events, the event organizer, to expand its offer by adding to its traditional B2B formula a full set of conferences and master classes.

== Locations ==
Game Connection takes place in two different locations at two different times of the year.

- Game Connection Europe is held in Paris (France) during the fall, after having been set in Lyon for 10 years.
- Game Connection America is held in San Francisco (USA) during the spring.

== The Online Meeting System ==
Before the event, all attendees register on the Game Connection website. Through the online meeting system, participants can learn about each other's company projects and interests; search through the database, ask questions, send meeting requests and much more. This means meetings are only scheduled when both parties are interested, thus increasing the efficiency of the event and the probability that the right business partners will be found. On the website, developers can display their projects to give publishers an idea of what they will be presenting at the convention.

During the event, each exhibitor (game seller or service provider) has a closed booth in which to make presentations to buyers during half-hour meetings. Depending on individual schedules, companies can feasibly conduct up to 40 meetings in three days.

== The Selected Projects program ==
The Selected Projects program is designed to shed light on the most innovative and creative projects that the industry offers and gives additional exposure to its nominees.

The program started in 2008 under the name of "Level-up" and it was an exclusive of Game Connection Europe. In 2010 it was renamed Selected Projects and today is part of Game Connection America, as well.

Developers are invited to submit console, mobile and online games at any stage of development. The top 15 Selected Projects receive a free entrance to the convention, special rates on any exhibitor option, a five-minute presentation of their projects to high-level publishers and the chance to be named “Best Project of the Year”.

== Connection Events ==
Connection Events is the organizer of Game Connection. Created in July 2006, the company is a spin-off of Lyon Game, a non-profit organization which initially launched Game Connection Europe, however closed its doors in 2009. Through the years, Connection Events has developed a true expertise in the video games industry that led to being given the charge of organizing the Lyon Game Developers Conference, the first French edition of the original GDC held yearly in California as well as the Paris GDC Game Developers Conference, the first of which took place in Paris on June 23–24, 2008. Since then, Connection Events has focused on the organization of Game Connection Europe and Game Connection America, as well as of other events such as the Serious Game Expo, property of the cluster Imaginove.

Since 2007, Connection Events has also developed an expertise in Master Classes which have taken place in Lyon and Paris. With a 20-person limit per training session, these master classes are designed for video game professionals who want to develop their skills in different domains in a concrete way: production, arts, game design, programming and business. Among other professionals, Mike Acton from Insomniac Games, Christophe Balestra from Naughty Dog, Thomas Bideaux, Noah Falstein, Clinton Keith, and Doug Mealy have shared their skills during these master classes.
