= Iran Computer and Video Games Foundation =

Iranian cultural institution

Iran National Foundation of Computer Games
- بنیاد ملی بازی‌های رایانه‌ای
- Formation: 2007
- Type: Non-profit cultural and artistic institute
- Headquarters: Tehran, Iran
- Region served: Iran
- Key people: Mohammad Haji Mirzaei (managing director, appointed 2025)
- Parent organization: Ministry of Culture and Islamic Guidance
- Website: en.ircg.ir

The Iran Computer and Video Games Foundation (ICVGF) (بنیاد ملی بازی‌های رایانه‌ای; Bonyād-e Mellī-ye Bāzī-hā-ye Rāyāneh-ī), also known in English as the National Foundation for Computer Games (NFCG), is an Iranian cultural institution affiliated with the Ministry of Culture and Islamic Guidance that supports and regulates parts of Iran's video game sector.

The foundation's statute describes it as a non-profit, non-governmental cultural and artistic institute with independent legal personality, operating under the supervision of the Ministry of Culture and Islamic Guidance and headquartered in Tehran.

Established in 2007, the foundation has been described as working to develop domestic game production (including training and industry events) while implementing national content guidance through mechanisms such as Iran's game rating system.

It has also been reported to participate in licensing and enforcement decisions affecting some foreign titles and access to certain game-related services in Iran, particularly where authorities consider content politically or culturally sensitive.

== History ==
The foundation's statute was approved in the mid-2000s as part of the state's cultural policy framework for digital games, and the organization began operating in 2007 under the Ministry of Culture and Islamic Guidance.

In the late 2000s, the foundation helped establish national rating activities through the Entertainment Software Rating Association (ESRA).

In 2010 it established the Iran Game Development Institute (IGDI) as a training initiative; later foundation publications and industry coverage described IGDI projects receiving awards at domestic festivals and being presented internationally.

In 2015 the foundation's research function was described as being consolidated in the Digital Games Research Center (DIREC), which publishes surveys and analytical reports about game consumption and the domestic market.

In September 2022 the Ministry of Culture and Islamic Guidance announced the appointment of Mohammad-Amin Haji-Hashemi as managing director of the foundation. In April 2025 Iranian media reported the appointment of Mohammad Haji Mirzaei as managing director and the naming of board members.

== Legal status and governance ==
Under its statute, the foundation is overseen by a board-of-trustees structure linked to the Ministry of Culture and Islamic Guidance; the statute also sets out governing bodies and the role of the managing director (CEO) in administration and implementation. Leadership appointments in the 2020s have been publicly announced through the ministry and Iranian media, including 2022 and 2025 managing-director decrees.

== Duties ==
Poster for the "LevelUp" video game development event, hosted by the ICVGF

The foundation's publicly described activities include policy support, training, market supervision, and research across Iran's digital games ecosystem.

=== Support and industry development ===
The foundation and affiliated initiatives have described support mechanisms for studios and teams, including the operation of a game-development incubator (markaz-e roshd), mentoring, and access to exhibition space for resident teams.

=== Education and training ===
Coverage of Iran's early game-industry policy describes training, workshops, and the development of professional capacity as a core objective of the foundation and its affiliated institutes.

=== Research and statistics (DIREC) ===
DIREC describes itself as the foundation's digital games research center and publishes periodic surveys on gamer behavior and market indicators; a 2021–2022 landscape report describes DIREC's role in survey design and methodology and frames the foundation's mission as support, education, regulation/supervision, and research. Academic health research on gaming in Iran has cited DIREC statistics as part of broader discussion of national gaming prevalence and trends.

=== International promotion and industry events ===
Iranian media have reported the foundation's participation in international networking and business events, including cooperation with the Game Connection brand and the establishment of a Tehran-based industry convention in the late 2010s.

=== Regulation and licensing ===
The statute and subsequent reporting describe the foundation as involved in supervision and licensing frameworks for the domestic market, including standards and content guidance alongside support and training functions.

==== Video game bans ====
Reports have linked the foundation to decisions restricting specific foreign games or services in Iran, particularly where Iranian authorities assert political or cultural objections. One widely reported case involved the 2016 game 1979 Revolution: Black Friday, after Iranian authorities announced plans to block websites offering the title and described it as presenting “false and distorted information” about the Iranian Revolution. In 2012, Iranian authorities were reported to have denied a license for Arma 3 due to the game's depiction of Iran's armed forces in its storyline.

== Organization ==
=== Entertainment Software Rating Association ===
In 2007, the foundation established the Entertainment Software Rating Association (ESRA), which assigns age and content ratings for games released in Iran.

=== Iran Game Development Institute ===
The foundation established the Iran Game Development Institute (IGDI) as a game development training initiative that participates in foundation-backed events and competitions.

Video games developed by the Iran Game Development Institute (selected award claims in foundation publications)
Game	Award	Event
Granny and Grim	Best Indie Game of the Year	1st Tehran Video Game Festival
Bloody Streets	Best Indie Game of the Year	3rd Tehran Video Game Festival
Blue Waters	Best Strategic Game of the Year	4th Tehran Video Game Festival
Hate the Sin, Love the Sinners	Selected Project (Best Project nominee)	Game Connection Asia 2013

=== Digital Games Research Center (DIREC) ===
DIREC (Digital Games Research Center) is described in foundation research publications as the foundation's research department, founded in 2015 to increase research capacity and publish statistical and analytical reports on Iran's games ecosystem.

== Festivals and exhibitions ==
The official poster of the Fifth Tehran Video Game Festival

The foundation organizes and supports game exhibitions and festivals in Iran, alongside later industry-facing events and award programs.

Tehran computer game exhibitions and festivals (selected early editions)
Event	Date	Location in Tehran
1st Tehran Computer Game Festival	April–May 2011 (five days; opened 28 April)	Milad Tower
2nd Tehran International Computer Games Expo and Festival	June–July 2012 (6–10 Tir 1391)	Imam Khomeini Mosalla
3rd Tehran Computer Game Festival	13–17 August 2013	Imam Khomeini Mosalla

Tehran Video Game Festival (2011–2015)
Edition	Date
1st Tehran Video Game Festival	17–21 August 2011
2nd Tehran Video Game Festival	13–17 August 2012
3rd Tehran Video Game Festival	13–17 August 2013
4th Tehran Video Game Festival	2 September – 2 October 2014
5th Tehran Video Game Festival	20 May – 20 August 2015

Later editions have frequently been referred to as the Iran Video Game(s) Festival in English-language coverage and are described as annual foundation-organized award programs.

English-language naming has varied over time: early coverage and foundation publications refer to the event as the Tehran Video Game Festival, while later reporting commonly uses Iran Video Game Festival (or Iran Video Games Festival) for subsequent editions, reflecting an apparent shift from city-branded to national branding in English usage.

Iran Video Games Festival (selected later editions)
Edition / event	Date	Notes
8th Iran Video Game Festival	March 2019 (winners announced for 11 March)	Tehran Times reported the festival as an annual program organized by the foundation.
11th Iran Video Game Festival	February 2026 (closing ceremonies reported 21 February)	Reported closing ceremony and awards across multiple categories.

Events hosted or co-organized by the foundation (selected, with year)
Event	Year / dates	Source
Tehran Game Convention (TGC)	July 2017 (first edition reported)	Financial Tribune (industry coverage)
Iran Game Week: Haft Khan (week-long industry showcase)	12–18 February 2026	

=== Tehran Game Convention ===
The foundation has also organized industry-facing business events. The first Tehran Game Convention (TGC) was reported in Iranian business press as taking place in July 2017, with international publishers and studios attending. Iranian media also reported cooperation with the Game Connection brand as part of international outreach and event programming in the mid-2010s.

=== Fajr Video Games Festival ===
Since the 2020s, Iranian media have described the foundation as organizing the Fajr Video Games Festival, which includes competitive sections and industry programming.

Fajr Video Games Festival (selected recent editions)
Edition	Date	Notes
9th edition	January 2024 (closing ceremony reported 14 January)	Tehran Times reported award categories and attendance by Iran's culture minister.

=== Other award programs ===
Foundation research publications also discuss “serious games” as a policy and industry focus, including a dedicated prize and conference/hackathon components described in sector reporting and DIREC materials.

== See also ==
- Entertainment Software Rating Association
- Tehran Game Convention
- Digital Games Research Center
