= Special Operation 85: Hostage Rescue =

2007 video game

Special Operation 85: Hostage Rescue (Persian: عملیات ویژه 85، آزادی گروگان‌ها) is an Iranian video game that was released by the Association of Islamic Unions of Students (Persian: اتحادیه انجمن‌های اسلامی دانش‌آموزان) on Monday, July 16, 2007.

== Story ==
Two young Iranian nuclear scientists, Saeed and his wife Maryam, are kidnapped by US military forces while on a religious pilgrimage to Karbala, Iraq, and are sent to a prison in Israel. Bahram Nasseri, an Iranian special operations agent, is sent to Israel to save the scientists and four other Iranians. While in Israel, Nasseri also exposes an Israeli-Iranian responsible for leaking classified information about Iran's nuclear program to Western powers. The name of Nasseri's mission is "The Special Operation".

== Gameplay ==
The game is a 3D first-person shooter with eight levels of play. The player character, Bahram Nasseri, must kill US and Israeli soldiers and manage his Iranian-made AK-47's ammunition while pursuing the rescue objectives. Nasseri must also obtain secret information from the laptops of slain enemy combatants.

== Development ==
Special Operation 85 was created in three years on a budget of US$ 32,000 (300 million rials) provided by the Union of the Islamic Students. The development team, led by Ali Reza Masaeli, was based in Isfahan, Iran.

The game was created in response to Assault on Iran, an American video game by Kuma Reality Games that simulates the destruction of an Iranian nuclear facility by US military forces. According to Mohammad Taghi Fakhrian, the Union's secretary general, the game was inspired by Iran's Supreme Leader, Ayatollah Ali Khamenei, and aims to encourage ideals such as "defense, sacrifice and martyrdom". He has responded to critics by stressing that the game does not promote terrorism.
