= Teimuraz =

Teimuraz (Georgian: თეიმურაზი) may refer to:

- Teimuraz (given name), a Georgian masculine given name
- Teimuraz I (1589–1663), Georgian king
- Teimuraz II (1695–1762), Georgian king
- Teimuraz I, Prince of Mukhrani (died 1625), ruled in 1605–1625
- Teimuraz II, Prince of Mukhrani (1649–1688), ruled in 1668–1688
- Teimuraz of Imereti (died 1772), Georgian king
