= Danag-i Menog-i Khrad =

Zoroastrian Middle Persian book circa 8th century

The Dānāg-ī Mēnōg-ī Xrad (Middle Persian pronunciation: [ˈdaːnaːgiː ˈmeːnoːgiː xrad], lit. 'Opinions of The Spirit of Wisdom') is a Middle Persian book which was written about 8th century. It comprises the replies of that spirit to sixty-two inquiries, or groups of inquiries, made by a certain wise man regarding various subjects connected with Zoroastrianism. This treatise contains about 11,000 words, and was long known, like the Shikand-gumanig Vizar (53), only through its Pazend version, prepared by a Persian Zoroastrian writer, Neryosang in middle age.

This book is translated to English by West in 1871. followed by a translation of the Pahlavi text in 1885.

== Plot ==
The book contains the conversation between a wise man and the Spirit of Wisdom (Menog-i Khrad), each on answers the other's questions in philosophical and religious matters.

== See also ==
- Menog-i Khrad
- Middle Persian
- Middle Persian literature
- Zoroastrianism
