= Jamshid =

Mythical Iranian king, divinity and character in Shahnameh

Jamshid Avestan: 𐬫𐬌𐬨𐬀
- God of the underworld, Third king of the Pishdadian dynasty
- Portrait of Jamshid by Mihr 'Ali, 1803
- Other names: Yima Xshaeta, Yima, Yam, Jam, Yamsho, Iamsho, Jamshed
- Affiliation: Avestan heroes, Shahnameh kings, Kushan pantheon
- Abode: Chehel Menar
- Texts: Avesta, Bundahishn, Vendidad, Shahnameh, Menog-i Xrad
- Gender: Male

Equivalents
- Christian: Solomon
- Hindu: Yama

Jamshid (Persian: جمشید, /ˌdʒæmˈʃiːd/; Jam, Persian: جم, [d͡ʒæm]), also known as Yima (Avestan: 𐬫𐬌𐬨𐬀, [jiˈma]) or Yima Xshaeta in Zoroastrianism, is a mythical Iranian Shah in the Persian mythological tradition, and originally worshipped as a yazata and semi-divine god of the dead in pre-Zoroastrian Iran. In the Avesta, he rules the world during an age of extraordinary prosperity, when living beings are protected from death, sickness and extremes of heat and cold. In the Videvdad, Ohrmazd entrusts him with preserving and increasing life, and Yima enlarges the inhabited earth as its population grows. He also builds the underground vara to shelter selected humans, animals and plants from a devastating winter. Yima possesses exceptional divine royal glory (khwarrah), which he loses after falsehood enters his mind. Later stories develop his fall into that of Jamshid.

The figure has an Indo-Iranian counterpart in the Vedic Yama. Their fathers, Avestan Vivanghvant and Vedic Vivasvant, also bear corresponding names, but the Indian and Iranian narratives differ markedly. Vedic Yama is associated with the first human death and with ruling the departed, while Yima is chiefly presented as an early ruler in the surviving Iranian myths. Scholars have proposed that Yima once shared the role of an underworld divinity with Yama, although the evidence is indirect and other Iranian traditions identify him as the ruler of a heavenly Paradise. Connections with a reconstructed Indo-European primordial twin, and comparisons with the Norse Ymir, likewise remain matters of scholarly interpretation.

In Middle and New Persian literature, Jamshid acquires an extensive range of royal and cultural achievements. Stories credit him with organizing social classes, introducing crafts and useful products, and founding religious observances. The origins of Nowruz are linked to his throne (takht), which Divs raise into the sky as he shines like the sun. The Shahnameh develops the story of Yima's sin and the loss of his khwarrah (royal glory) which leads to the rise of Zahhak the demon-king, who orders Jamshid sawed in half. While Yima's deeds and character are inherited by the Shahnameh, many new achievements are ascribed to him not previously found in Zoroastrian literature.

The figure also appears beyond the Iranian plateau. Under the Kushans, a Bactrian form called Yamsho or Iamsho was represented on coins, including those of Huvishka, and entered personal names. His Kushan characterization as a semi-divine monarch was not identical to his Zoroastrian portrayals. Zoroastrian writings continued to regard Yima as worthy of veneration despite the account of his sin, and later priestly literature incorporated aspects of his legends into accounts of the world's future renewal. Iranian historians during the Islamic period preserved many stories of Jamshid, sometimes identifying him with the biblical figure of King Solomon.

== Name and etymology ==
The name Jamshid is pronounced /ˌdzhaemˈshiːd/ in English and appears in Classical Persian as "جمشید" (Jamshed) pronounced [d͡zhamˈsheːd]. The shorter name جم, Jam, is used in Middle and New Persian. These names continue the figure called 𐬫𐬌𐬨𐬀, Yima, in Avestan, who appears as the fourth king of the mythical Pishdadian dynasty in the Shahnameh. The early designation Yima Xshaeta developed into Jamshed, a form under which the ancient king remained prominent in Persian storytelling. The compound is generally analyzed as Jam and shid, corresponding to Yima and Xshaeta. A reconstructed Proto-Iranian form is *Yamah Xshaitah, glossed as “Yama, the brilliant” or “majestic”. The first element is linked with Sanskrit Yama, commonly interpreted as “twin”.

The meaning of xshaeta, Yima's regular epithet, remains uncertain. It is also applied to the sun in expressions that gave rise to Middle Persian xwarshed and New Persian khorshid, and to celestial divinities, Tishtar, Burz Yazad and the life-giving Amehraspands. A related feminine form, xshoithni, occurs with the goddesses Ahrishwang, Anahita and dawn, all interpreted as luminous beings or phenomena. The possibility of a solar meaning for Yima's title draws on descriptions of him as looking like the sun among mortals in Yasna 9.4 and as immortal and “sun-filled” in Yasna 9.1. On this interpretation the epithet could describe the sun's golden or reddish colour. A parallel has been proposed with words for the colour of horses, including the personal name Shedasp, borne by a grandson of Jamshid, a son of Tur, in the Garshaspnameh.

Friedrich Carl Andreas and Walter B. Henning instead proposed a sense related to rulership, comparing xwar-shed as “sun-lord” with the Iranian root xshay-, “to rule”. Emile Benveniste's proposed gloss was “chief”. The evidence is considered slight, however, and the comparison is complicated by Sogdian axshed, a word for “ruler” used in Manichaean expressions for a lord of heaven or the gods and reported as a title of Sogdian rulers. Skjaervo offered another possibility, that the Sogdian word was borrowed from Middle Persian xshed. Medieval Muslim writers commonly explained shid as “brightness” or “radiance” by comparing the word for the sun. Ibn al-Atir additionally explained jam as “moon”, while Abu'l-Feda contrasted jam-shid as the radiance of the moon with khvor-shid as the radiance of the sun, preserving their Arabic descriptions shoa al-qamar and shoa al-shams. A Bactrian name of the same inherited figure appears as ιαμthο, transcribed Yamsho, alongside the Iranian forms Yima Xshaeta and Jamshed.

== History and origins ==
The Avestan Yima corresponds to the Vedic Yama, just as Yima's father, Vivanghvant, corresponds to Vivasvant, Yama's father. The father's name is related to light and shining, and Vivasvant is connected with the solar deity Surya. The comparison involves Old Indic Vivasvant and Avestan Viuuangvhant, whose Gathic genitive is Viuuang-husho, alongside Indic vi-vas-, vi-ucha- and Avestan vi.usa- in the semantic field of shining or lighting up. Yima's story is among the most developed inherited Iranian myths, while his character differs strikingly from the Indian Yama. The surviving Indian and Iranian traditions describe Yama and Yima as rulers rather than straightforward progenitors of all humanity. The Vedas nevertheless give Yama a twin sister and consort, Yami, with whom he has children. No such sister is explicitly named in the Avesta. Iranian linguistic evidence includes an Avestan common noun meaning “twin”, related to Sanskrit yama, and later Middle Iranian forms. Pahlavi literature knows a woman named Yimak, whom some scholars tentatively connect with the older Indo-Iranian legend. In Vedic tradition the first man is Manu, another son of Vivasvant whose role sometimes overlaps with Yama's. Iranian sources retain the name in Manush.chithra (Manuchihr), “of the race of Manu”, in Yasht 13.131, and in Manushag, a woman called Manushchihr's sister in Pahlavi writings. Later genealogies make these figures descendants of Yim and Yimag, themselves descendants seven generations removed from Mashya and Mashyanag, the Iranian first man and woman.

The shared father-name presents a difficulty for any literal idea that Yama or Yima was the first man, since both traditions give him a father. They also preserve related stories about that father. In Vedic tradition Vivasvant was the first performer of sacrifice. A sacrificial site could therefore be called the “place of Vivasvant”, while the name could serve as an honourable designation for its officiating priest. In Iran Vivanghvant was the first mortal to press haoma plant, receiving from the god Haoma the gift of a celebrated son, Yima. Vedic Yama is particularly associated with the decision to accept a mortal destiny. A verse translated in Zaehner's account describes him as choosing death to please the gods rather than immortality for his descendants. Having taken the path of death himself, he made that way known to others, who could come to his dwelling of song. As lord of the dead he gave his name to the path of death, which in later imagery could acquire a frightening appearance. The Iranian material does not preserve this role in the same form, and some accounts have undergone changes that make their earlier configuration difficult to recover.

Scholars have long compared Yima's myths with Indian, Mesopotamian and Biblical narratives, but disagree about what the similarities prove and about the figure's deeper Indo-European origins. One reconstruction identifies a primordial first human *Yemo as a twin whose story later took different forms. Comparisons have been drawn with the Norse Ymir, whose body becomes the cosmos, the Roman twins Romulus and Remus, the Indic Yama who charts the road to the afterlife, and the Iranian Yima who becomes a fallen and murdered king.

== Yima as god of the underworld ==
In Vedic tradition, Yama was the first man to live on earth and the first to die. By dying, he opened the road to the kingdom of the dead, where popular belief placed him as a formidable ruler whose character became closely identified with Death itself, all-powerful and pitiless. He summons those whose time has come, and his servants take the doomed away "haltered by the neck", or grivabaddham. In Iran, corresponding functions belong to Vayu, the god of death, and Astwihad, the div of death who ensnares victims with a noose. In later Indian and Buddhist literature, Yama remains a terrifying lord of the underworld. Sanskrit renderings of the Avesta even identify him with the Iranian Astwihad.

The Vedic Yama's kingdom includes the dead who have not entered the higher Paradise, since, as a Vedic passage puts it, "in heaven Yama is not". The spirits travel downward to his subterranean abode. Yet the Rigveda also calls this region a gavyuti, or "cattle pasture", a description compared with Yima's Avestan epithet meaning "of the good herds". Another Vedic tradition places Yama in a Paradise above, where he rules happily over the blessed dead. An old belief about the journey of the dead appears to involve a dangerous crossing, perhaps of an underground river or lake, and a pair of four-eyed dogs that the departing spirit must pass. The dogs belong to Yama in the Indian tradition. Iranian tradition places comparable dogs guarding the Chinvat Bridge, the crossing encountered by souls after death, and escorting the goddess Daena in her task to guide the dead, and also sometimes situates Yima in a Paradise above.

An Iranian account describes a subterranean realm whose divine ruler is "the god who is said to dwell beneath the earth". Those who die while unable to reach the upper Paradise become his subjects. This figure has been conjecturally identified with a pre-Zoroastrian Yima, in view of the position held by his Indian counterpart. The god beneath the earth was propitiated by ancient Persians. Names found at Persepolis, including Yamakka and Yamakhshedda, have been cited as evidence that Yima himself was known there. The ruler of such a kingdom would probably have been feared, like Yama and his messengers in Indian belief.

Iranian traditions also preserve signs of a heavenly abode ruled by Yima. In the account of Zoroaster's birth, the prophet's fravashi, or pre-existing spirit, dwells among the Immortals before the divine messenger Neryosang and Yima lead it to the boundary of Paradise. This has been taken to imply that Yima has a dwelling in heaven and some authority over souls there. An underworld ruled by Yima could not easily survive unchanged in Zoroastrian doctrine, which identifies the subterranean place of the wicked dead with Hell and its ruler with a malignant being hostile to Ohrmazd. It could therefore no longer be the dwelling of a revered king. One proposed explanation of the separate story in the Videvdad is that this difficulty helped change the older legend. That account depicts Yima entering a refuge alive and does not narrate his transgression or death.

== Mythology of Yima in the Avesta ==
In the Avesta, Yima rules the world in an age without extremes of heat or cold, sickness, or death. He is called the ruler "of the good herds". The Iranian accounts of his life contain the same broad inherited elements that also appear in Indian traditions, although the Avestan legends are more complex. In Vendidad, Zoroaster asks Ohrmazd to name the first mortal with whom he spoke. Ohrmazd names Yima. He says that he first asked Yima to carry forward, remember, practise, and proclaim his daena, meaning his religious thoughts, words, and deeds. Yima refused this mission, though the precise meaning of the verbs used in the offer has been debated. Ohrmazd then entrusted him instead with protecting and increasing living beings. Yima accepted, promising that as long as he ruled, there would be neither intolerable heat nor cold, disease, nor death. Ohrmazd gave him a cattle goad, the ashtra, and a second implement, the subra. The latter has been interpreted as a kind of pick or piercing tool, compared with Persian sumb-, and alternatively as a shepherd's flute or horn. The flute interpretation has been compared with nali in the Rigveda. Kellens has discussed the competing explanations.

Yima's kingdom lay in Khwaniratha, the continent whose centre contained Airyanem Vaejah, the land of the Aryans. According to another Iranian account, the first animals grew there from the seed of the Gav-e Ewdad, the primeval bull, after its death. Yima ruled there and attended an assembly of the gods. He possessed khwarrah, the divine glory, in the highest degree, called xvarenanghvastema in the Avestan formulation, corresponding to the exceptional glory ascribed among mortals to Zoroaster and, among divine beings, to Mithra, Ohrmazd, and his Word. His own youth, fixed at fifteen years of age, and immortality came from his father and passed to the people of his golden age. These qualities are mentioned repeatedly in the Avesta. Yasht 9.10 speaks of a thousand winters of such rule, while the Vendidad narrates three periods of three hundred winters before Yima's next task.

The absence of death and continual increase of living beings eventually made the inhabited earth too crowded. After three hundred winters, it was filled with men and cattle, dogs, birds, and red-glowing fires. Ohrmazd commanded Yima to use his implements to enlarge it. Yima struck the earth with his golden goad and whip, making it one-third broader. He repeated the act after the six-hundredth winter and a third time after the nine-hundredth, enlarging the land three times. The inherited calculations describe the final inhabited world as approximately twice its first size.

The Vendidad tells another story about the survival of living beings, without recounting Yima's sin or death. After a thousand years of rule, the gods assembled with him and with the best of his human subjects. In the Zoroastrian presentation Ohrmazd gives the warning. Terrible winters would come upon the "bad corporeal world", covering mountains and plains with cruel frost. When the snow melted, it would wash away fodder, leaving cattle to starve until even the footprint of a sheep would be a rare sight. Other versions speak of three destructive winters threatening mankind and animals. Yima was instructed to make an underground vara, a fortified enclosure or cavern, and preserve there pairs of the finest men and women and the best animals. He was to bring the seeds of the largest and most fragrant plants and the most delicious and nourishing ones, as well as the seeds of each sort of cattle and plant, so that life might again flourish after the disaster. The prescribed inhabitants could have neither bodily nor mental defects. The building of this refuge is itself counted among Yima's praised achievements. The vara was divided into three parts, which some interpreters have connected with the three divisions of Iranian society. Water ran through it, and its pasture remained perpetually green and inexhaustible. Its own lights shone like the sun, moon, and stars, while a year there passed like a single day outside. Every couple had a child once in forty years, and the inhabitants lived happily under Yima. Karshiptar, the "swiftly flying" bird, was said to have spread Zoroaster's teachings in this underground kingdom, according to Vendidad 2.42. The narrative lets Yima enter the hidden place alive, placing him among exceptional figures thought to pass living into the hereafter. It does not depict him dying and does not suggest that later people could enter the enclosure after death.

The date and origin of the vara account have been disputed. The surviving Vendidad redaction has often been placed in the Parthian period, and the earliest text attesting the episode has been dated by some to about the beginning of the Common Era. Its picture of the "bad corporeal world", described by sources as wholly un-Zoroastrian, and the physical nature of the underground refuge have prompted proposals of foreign influence. One interpretation connects it with Mesopotamian and other Semitic flood stories, including the Biblical account of Noah's ark. A once-floating ark could, on this reading, have become a cavern when the flood was recast as a winter disaster suited to the Iranian plateau. The underground location would also preserve a connection with an older Yima imagined as lord of the dead, receiving them in their "cattle pastures", called the Elysian fields of Iran. Such an adaptation has been described as awkwardly at odds with other Iranian and Indian traditions. Norbert Oettinger has likewise proposed that the winter catastrophe replaced an earlier flood because a severe winter carried particular force in the dry lands of eastern Iran. He regards the flowing meltwater in Vendidad 2.24 as a possible trace of the older story. Another comparison concerns the Scandinavian Fimbulwinter. It has been suggested, without certainty, that both winter catastrophes preserve a myth thousands of years old, from the Indo-European period. In the version where Yima retreats alive, his concealment, in which he remains tranquil through the present troubled age, has also been compared with Arthur's continued life in Avalon and Frederick Barbarossa's repose in a mountain cavern.

Yima's divine Fortune, known as xwarrah in Middle Persian, does not remain with him in the other Avestan accounts. Zamyad Yasht 19.33 says that a lie entered his mind, after which his khwarrah departed and his splendour and kingship ended. Another version describes the khwarrah flying from him three times in the form of a bird. Mithra caught it first, Fereydun second, and Garshasp third. Its three departures have been conjecturally related to the three social groups over which Yima ruled, namely priests, warriors, and artisans, but the reason is not known. The nature of his offence is also uncertain. Yasna 32.8 contains an obscure denunciation by Zoroaster of Yima Xshaeta, the "Shining Twin". One traditional reading takes him to have pleased people by giving them ox flesh to eat, perhaps through a bull sacrifice. Another reconstruction supposes that such a rite was believed to make people immortal, thereby ascribing to Yima a power that belonged to God in Zoroastrian thought. These proposed readings are disputed rather than certain meanings of the passage. An additional reconstruction combines the difficult Gathic verse, the three enlargements of the earth, and the Zamyad Yasht to locate his sin after the expansions. Deprived of glory, Yima trembled sorrowfully before his enemies. An old hymn also remembers that he was cut, perhaps in half, by a hostile figure, and one version identifies the killer as his brother Spityura. Later Persian stories give that role instead to Zahhak.

Yima's place among the oldest Iranian heroes appears in other Avestan passages. In Yasna 9.1–13, Haoma tells Zoroaster of four exceptional births granted because the fathers pressed the haoma plant to benefit the living world. Vivanhvant received Yima, who made the world immortal. Athwya received Fereydun, who bound the dragon Azhi Dahaka at Mount Damavand. Thrita of the Samas received Garshasp, destined to kill Azhi Dahaka at the end of time. Pourushaspa received Zoroaster, who would begin the return to immortality. The Avesta also names heroic sacrificers who petition deities for the power to perform acts sustaining cosmic order. Among the leading figures are Hushang, and Tahmuras, each a fighter against evil. These figures are not yet presented as relatives in the Avesta, and the text does not expressly connect Yima with Azhi Dahaka. The Avesta credits Yima with one practical craft in connection with the vara. Ohrmazd instructed him in making and using bricks of mud. The much broader building achievements later credited to Jamshid belong to subsequent Persian accounts.

Another chronology, described in the source as Avestan tradition, places Jam's departure at the end of an early millennium, about the year 7000. Conditions then worsen under Zahhak. A thousand years later Fereydun defeats him, and the world begins to improve until Zoroaster is born at the close of the following three-thousand-year period and reaches thirty years of age in the year 9000. The Avesta itself supplies some of the roles later incorporated into this account. Zoroaster's three naturally born sons were linked with the three social estates. His eldest son by his first wife, Isat-vastra, was made head of the priests. Hvare-chithra and Urvatat-nara, his sons by a second wife, headed the warrior and farming estates. Hvare-chithra, or perhaps his fravashi, is destined to lead forces commanded by the immortal Peshotanu, son of Vishtaspa. Urvatat-nara becomes the ahu and ratu, the master and judge, of Yima's kingdom of good pastures. This assignment has been interpreted as a Zoroastrian recasting of a much older Iranian myth, joining inherited legendary material to newer religious expectations.

The account of Yima's refuge also developed in later Zoroastrian teachings about the end of the world. In these versions its preserved stock of life is released not merely after an ancient winter, but at the end of world history. The opening of the vara becomes one of the great events at the close of the eleventh millennium. This development belonged to Zoroastrian scholastic tradition and apparently did not displace the more popular story of Jamshid's sin and death, which survived in the Shahnameh.

In one scheme of the last ages, following Ushedar's millennium, the world declines again. Some texts foresee enemy invasion, oppression of Iran, and suppression of its religion. Others foretell a disastrous winter in which humans and animals perish. This is the winter of Malkus, whose name is associated with the Avestan Mahrkusha, "the Destroyer", and with the old winter from which Yima sought refuge. At the end of the eleventh millennium the vara will reopen, sending out its inhabitants to repopulate the world and begin a new golden age before the second Saoshyant, Ushedarmah, also called Ukhshyat-nemah, is born. He will be thirty years old at the beginning of the new millennium in the year 11,000. In this age the world enjoys six years of blessing and the sun stands still for twenty days. Harmful creatures die, and people become gentler, first eating only vegetables and finally living solely on water.

== Religious status and other identifications ==
Yima continued to be regarded as worthy of veneration despite the tradition of his wrongdoing. His golden age could be reconciled with the Zoroastrian view that Ohrmazd's world was first created perfect and then damaged by Ahriman. The idea that conditions steadily declined after Yima was harder to reconcile with the expectation that Zoroaster's revelation would spread the Good Religion, increase righteousness, and lead the world to its final renewal, Frashokereti. One reconstruction proposes that a prophetic tradition among pre-Zoroastrian Iranians foretold a decline from a perfect age, including Yima's golden age. Later Zoroastrian priests are thought to have adapted such inherited accounts into a chronology reconciling decline with renewal through crises repeated every thousand years during the fourth period of the cosmic year.

Middle Persian literature preserved stories of Jam's New Year celebration, his sister, his arrogance, and his conflict with Zahhak. Zoroastrian Persian and Muslim authors also transmitted tales about Jamshid and Tahmuras, the medicinal use of bull's urine, and Jamshid's many inventions. These stories entered the New Persian Shahnameh. They also recur among Muslim historians from Abu Hanifa Dinawari, who died between 894 and 903, al-Tabari, who lived from 839 to 923, and Abu Ali Amirak Balami, who died between 992 and 997, to Mirkhvand, who lived from 1433 to 1498.

Some Muslim historians tried to synchronize Iranian legends with Biblical history by identifying Jamshid with Solomon. Ibn Qutayba gives this identification. Dinawari and Maqdisi also report it. Maqdisi also observes that the Persians assigned Jamshid the miracles attributed to Solomon. Estakhri and Ibn Hawqal associated Persepolis with Solomon's mosque. Moqaddasi also records the name Mal'ab Solayman, or "Solomon's playground". Mostawfi reports a statement from the lost Sowar al-aqalim, possibly by Abu Zayd Balkhi, that the columns of Persepolis belonged to Solomon's mosque. He further suggests that Solomon might have converted Jamshid's house into a mosque.

Ibn al-Nadim notes competing accounts about whether Solomon or Jamshid was the first to force the demons into service. Several authors objected to identifying the two kings because the chronology would separate their lives by an immense span. Dinawari reckoned more than three thousand years between them, while Mirkhvand proposed more than two thousand and offered additional arguments against the identification.

== Mythology of Jamshid in later traditions ==
In Middle and New Persian tradition, Yima Xshaeta appears as Jam or Jamshid. He remains the archetype of splendid kingship, celebrated as the greatest Iranian hero and the "most glorious of mortals", a model of royal power for later rulers. He is the king, rather than simply a god, of the primeval Paradise. His rule is remembered as a time of peace and abundance. Men did not have to labour because Divs worked for them, and no one died. The Bundahishn adds that Jam maintained this golden age with the protection of the three great fires lit by Ohrmazd as divine glories for living beings, Adur Farrobay or Farnbay, Adur Gushnasp, and Adur Burzenmihr.

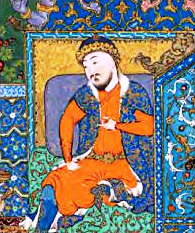
Jamshid - Shahnameh of Shah Tahmasp

Later works offer different accounts of the inhabitants' long lives. In the Middle Persian rendering of Yasna 9.1, people become immortal by eating meat that Jam provides, while the Persian Rivayats offer another explanation of their survival. In some Middle Persian texts, the word for immortality denotes an exceptionally long life rather than endless existence. The Menog-i Xrad allows three hundred years, whereas the Pahlavi Videvdad gives one hundred and fifty. Other accounts say that Ohrmazd made Jam, Feredun, and Kay-Us immortal, but that Jam and Kay-Us lost this gift by sinning. In the Persian Rivayats, the people of Jam's age remained so alike in youth that observers could not distinguish fathers from sons. The reported length of Jamshid's own rule also differs. The Bundahishn gives him 616 years and six months before his khwarrah departed and then a century of exile, called wireg. The Middle Persian Aogemadaeca says that he kept the world immortal for 616 years, six months, and thirteen, or according to another reading sixteen, days. The Pazand Ayadgar-i Zamaspig gives him 717 years and seven months before he departed with Jami. In Zahir al-Din Marashi's history of Tabarestan, his reign lasts a thousand years. This may reflect the thousand winters ascribed to Yima in Yasht 9.10.

Jamshid's later reputation as the founder of civilization greatly exceeds the one craft ascribed to Yima in the Avesta. Middle Persian and subsequent authors credited the first kings generally with inventions, but assigned Jam most of the achievements that made civilized life possible. Ibn al-Nadim preserves a source describing his reign as a period of civilization spreading over the whole world, a process that continued until Zahhak's accession. Mirkhvand even placed the philosopher Pythagoras, called Fithaghurath, at Jamshid's court. Jamshid also organized human beings into social classes, separating priests and warriors from farmers and those who practised crafts. The fuller version of the story has four classes, each given its own duties. Jam himself combined the offices of king and priest. He taught people to weave cotton, silk, wool, and linen, to make garments from them, and to wash their clothes. He introduced sowing, weapons, and other equipment for warfare. He constructed wooden ships and used them to bring back pearls for adornment. He drew precious stones out of rock and gold and silver from the earth. He introduced furs, selected perfumes, and cultivated gardens and parks planted with trees and flowers. He also taught healing and medicine. In al-Tabari's version, Jamshid ordered the demons, or divs, to produce depilatories, fragrances, and medicinal substances. Other later Persian accounts assign brickmaking and construction to demons working at his command. Religious practices also became part of Jam's civilizing work. The Dadestan-i denig and Persian Rivayats credit Jam with teaching people to wear the kusti, the sacred girdle. The prose Sad dar likewise credits him with the kusti and also attributes the hamazor rite to him. The metrical Sad dar assigns to Jam the seasonal gahanbar festivals. The Mah i frawardin roz i xordad and Persian Rivayats additionally credit him with the use of ossuaries or dakhmas for the dead. Al-Masudi reports that Jam founded the cult of fire and taught that fire was an image of the light of the sun and stars. This has been proposed as an ancient tradition because burning red fires already figure prominently, together with humans, cattle, dogs, and birds, among the inhabitants of Yima's Avestan world.

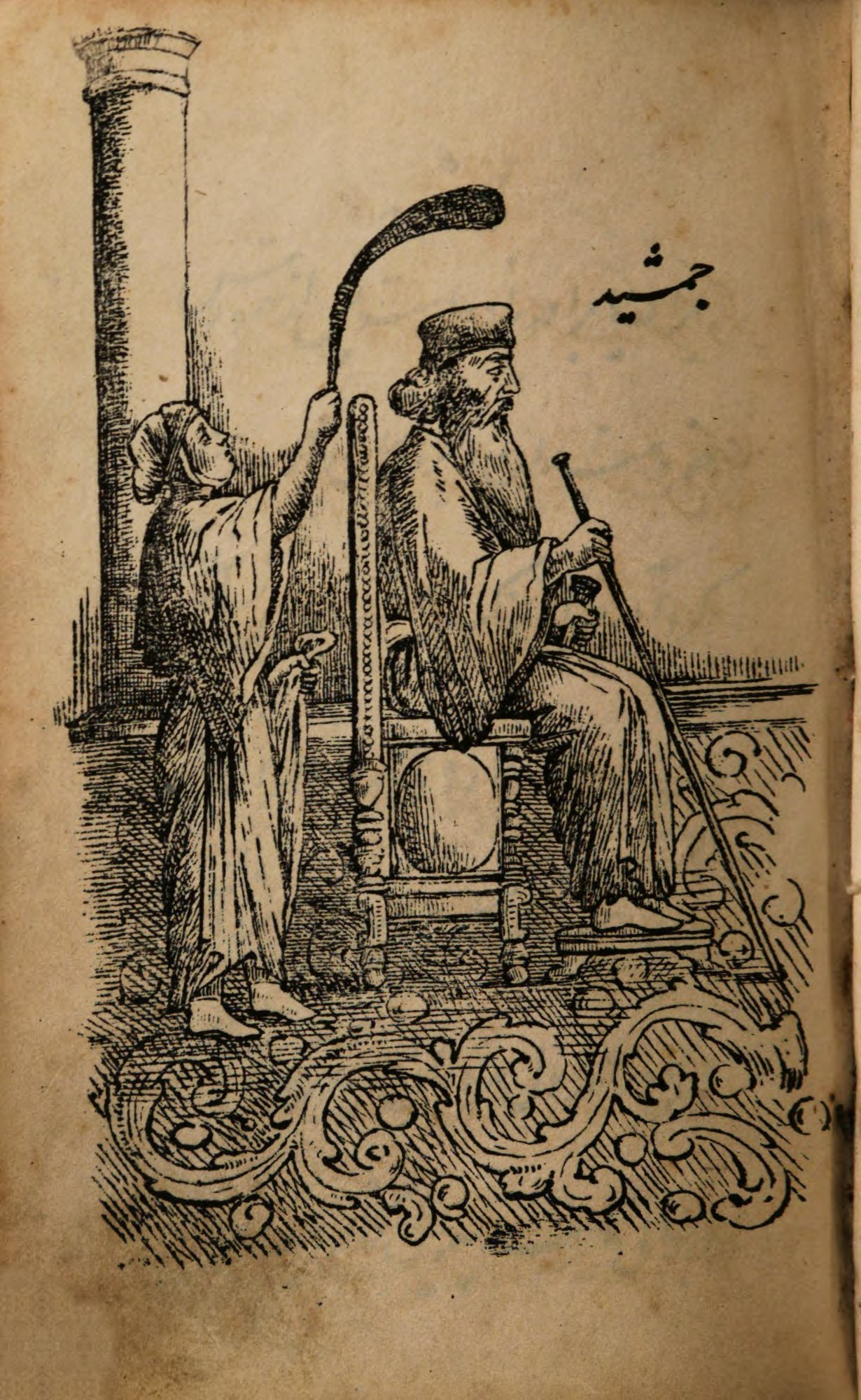
Jamshid, modeled after Achaemenid depictions at Persepolis

The Persian Rivayats tell how God summoned Jamshid and gave him kingship over the world, along with a signet ring, a throne, and a diadem. When Jam descended to earth from Mount Alborz, the people looking toward him believed they saw two suns, the second being the radiant king, an image also reported by al-Biruni. The Shahnameh gives another account of his exaltation. Jamshid had a throne (takht) made and studded with precious gems, called gowhar. At his order the divs raised it high into the air, where he sat shining like the sun while people from throughout the world gathered below and scattered jewels toward him. In the accounts of al-Tabari and Abu Mansur Tha'alebi, the flying throne also allowed him to travel between Mount Damavand and Babylon in a single day. The celebration of this ascent was called the New Day, or Nowruz, the first day of the year, and became an annual festival of merriment and gift-giving. A version records Jamshid holding a feast of wine, song, and music on the day of Ohrmazd, the first of the month of Farvardin. In another account, the Pahlavi Mah i frawardin roz i xordad places the new celebration on Xordad, the sixth day of the month, after Jam had introduced ossuaries and ordered others to build them. The Persian Rivayats preserve this variation as well. A later telling by the Capuchin missionary to Persia and Armenia, Gabriel du Chinon, makes Gemechid, or Jamshid, ascend every day into the sun's heaven and return with knowledge of the stars. In that telling, however, the golden age belongs to Fereydun, rather than to Jamshid. Jamshid is also credited with inventing music.

The association between Jamshid and Nowruz appears in a Manichaean text describing the lords of the world gathering before Yam (Jamshid) on New Year's Day, suggesting that the link predates some of the later Persian accounts. Under the Achaemenids, a New Year's procession of provincial rulers bringing gifts to the king was depicted on the reliefs at Persepolis. The palace ruins later acquired the name Takht-e Jamshid, "Throne of Jamshid", though the age of the association between this place-name and the legend remains uncertain. Mirkhvand adds that Jamshid moved his seat from Sejestan, or Sistan, to Fars early in his reign and built the palace called Chehel Menar at Persepolis. He too connects the day of Jamshid's enthronement with the first Nowruz.

Other authors credited Jam with founding cities and public works. Hamza Esfahani and the Mojmal al-tawarikh report that Jam founded Ctesiphon and built a bridge across the Tigris. The bridge was said to have been destroyed by Iskandar (Alexander), although its ruins remained visible. Hamd-Allah Mostawfi and Ebn al-Athir also tell of it. Mostawfi also credits Jam with completing Estakhr, whose building had begun under Kayumars and Hushang, as well as Hamadan and the Tigris bridge. Ebn Balkhi says that Jam made Estakhr his capital and turned it into a great city with three fortresses called Seh Gonbadan (3 domes). Banakati describes a large palace at Estakhr later known as Chehel Menara (Persepolis). The Shahrestaniha-i Eran-shahr records that Babylon was built during Jam's rule. Other accounts describe seven wonders attributed to him and later destroyed by Alexander, a story also found in the Persian Rivayats. In Tabarestan, Ebn Esfandiar tells how Jamshid defeated divs who had held the region uninhabitable and compelled them to level mountains, fill lakes, and drain marshland. Fakhr-e Modabber places Jamshid's black horse among the finest steeds, alongside Rakhsh, the famous horse of Rostam.

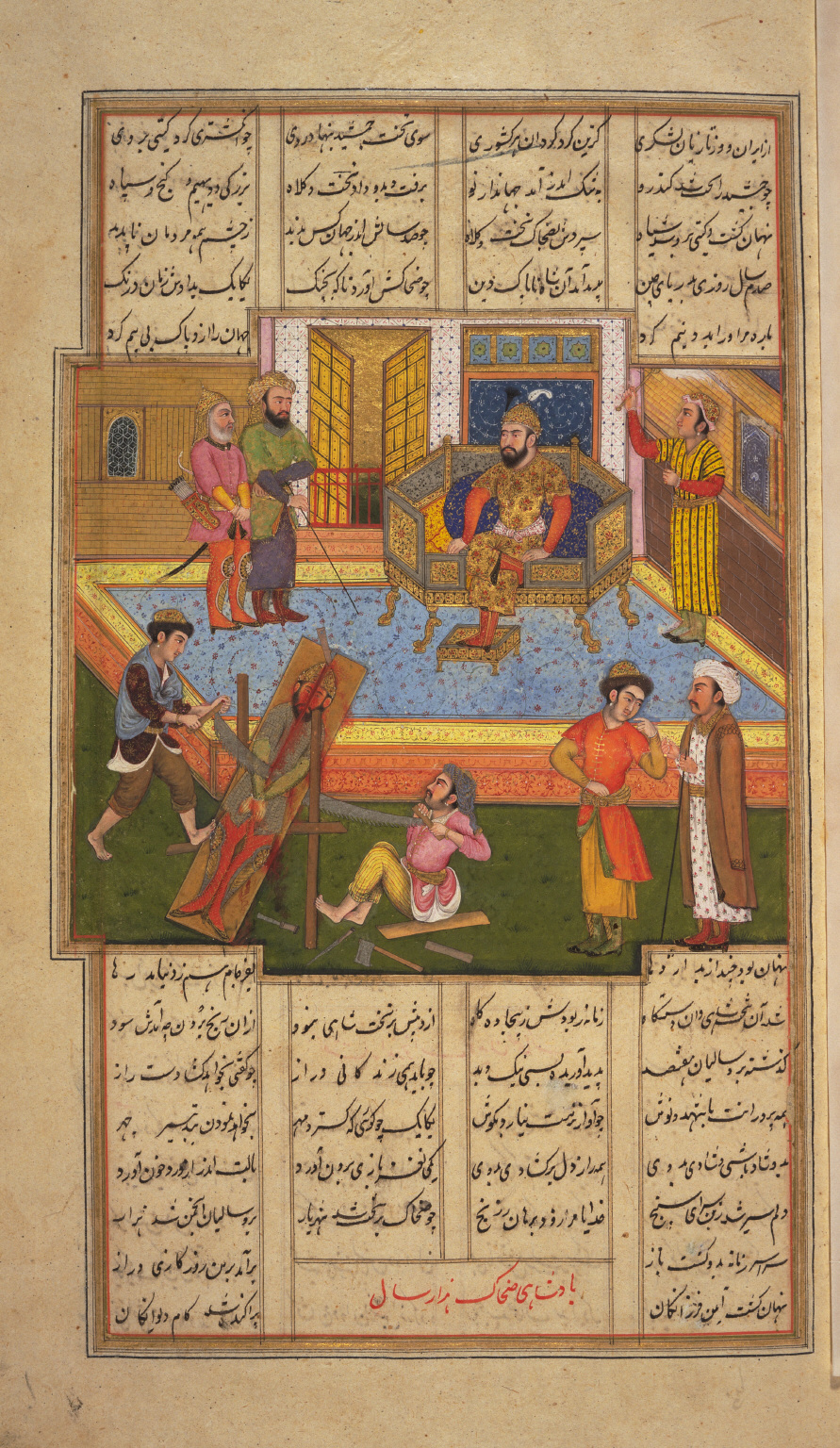
Jamshid sawed in half by Zahhak - Shahnameh

Jamshid's glory ended through his own pride in the better-known Persian accounts. Middle Persian religious writings and the Persian epic say that he claimed to be God. One interpretation links this claim with the ancient references to his lie and conjectures that he demanded sacrifices to himself. A related suggestion is that the story arose among priests of the ethical Ahuric tradition to explain his death in moral terms. This part of the Iranian legend has no close Indian counterpart. In the Shahnameh, Jamshid recounted all his accomplishments and demanded that his subjects call him the creator of the world. The people deserted him, his divine glory departed, and his future darkened. The older Iranian accounts do not describe the exact circumstances of his death consistently, but the later Persian story makes Zahhak his destroyer. The account then turns to Merdas, a respected prince with a brave and active son named Zahhak. Then Ahriman came to the court disguised as a visitor and won the innocent young man's confidence. Zahhak swore not to reveal the stranger's words and to obey his commands. Promising royal power, Ahriman persuaded him to kill Merdas and seize the throne. Ahriman next appeared as a cook and taught Zahhak to eat meat, although people had previously lived as vegetarians. He then flattered the new ruler and asked permission to kiss his shoulders. When the kiss was given, Ahriman vanished into the earth and two black serpents grew from Zahhak's shoulders. The king repeatedly cut them off, only for them to grow back. Returning disguised as a physician, the devil declared that they could be satisfied only by daily offerings of human brains. As Zahhak's power grew, Jamshid's authority collapsed and the people proclaimed Zahhak Shah of Iran. Jamshid fled and remained hidden until he was discovered in the Sea of China. Zahhak had him sawed in two, and then ruled for a thousand oppressive years. Virtue declined, sorcery spread, and every day two men were killed so that the serpents on his shoulders could be fed with their brains.

In the Avesta, Hushang, Tahmuras, and Jamshid occur in a sequence of heroic sacrificers without an explicit family relationship. Later Middle and New Persian texts turned this succession into a chronological narrative of two royal dynasties. Jamshid became Tahmuras's brother, although some accounts give a more distant brotherly relationship. Middle Persian works also connect Jam with Zoroaster. The Denkard makes the prophet a descendant of Jam through his human family, while his descent from the Life-giving Immortals passes through Neryosang. This relationship links the first and last of the four famous sons whose fathers had pressed haoma in the ancient hymn. Some later works give Jam a twin sister. The Pazand Ayadgar i Zamaspig says that Wiwanghan fathered Jam and Jami and that Jam took his sister into exile. The Persian Rivayats preserve a related account. In the Pahlavi Rivayat, Jam and his sister Jamag fled after he lost his throne, trying to escape humans and demons. When he could not be found either in the world or in Hell, Ahriman proposed searching their hiding place. A male Div and a female parig went to the pair, pretending that they too were fugitives, and persuaded them to enter a marriage union of four. The Bundahishn gives a shorter version without the deception. Frightened by demons, Jam married a female demon and gave Jami to a male one. Both traditions claim that these unions produced bears, monkeys, and other harmful beings, including the Gandarw, connected in later Persian storytelling with Zahhak's evil counsellor Kandrow.

Zadspram records a parallel genealogy involving Manushchihr and his otherwise unknown sister Manushag. She is said, with some uncertainty in the account, to have borne a daughter named Koxred, identified with an Avestan type of sorceress, through a union with Wrath. The Pahlavi Rivayat continues Jam's story with a drinking episode. When Jam and the male demon were drunk, Jamag exchanged clothing with the parig and slept with her brother, thereby performing xwedodah, a next-of-kin marriage. The religious merit of the act forced the two demons back into Hell. The Bundahishn also records twins born to Jam and Jamag, a man named Aspigan and a woman called Zreshom, whose subsequent marriage continued the family line. This story has been compared with Lot's daughters, who lay with their drunken father to preserve their family. In a later version recorded by Ebn Meskawayh, Jamshid marries his sister to a relative whom he makes king of Yemen, and their son is Dahag. Al-Biruni also says that Bivarasp, another name for Dahag, was the son of Jamshid's sister.

Another tale connects Jamshid with Tahmuras and explains the healing use of bull's urine, or gomez. Persian Rivayats and other Zoroastrian Persian manuscripts preserve it. Christensen and Konig discuss its variants. The account builds on the Avestan episode in which Taxma Urupi rode the Evil Spirit, transformed into a horse, around the world for thirty years. In the later tale Ahriman tricked Tahmuras and swallowed him. Jamshid eventually drew the demon toward him with a song and an offer to sodomize him, the two pleasures the god Soroush told him Ahriman most desired. When Ahriman turned away, Jamshid reached into his belly from his anus and pulled out his dead brother. His hand then became afflicted by leprosy and dryness, known as baras and qahal, and its stench made people avoid him. Jamshid fled to the mountains, wandering like a madman and complaining to God. Exhausted, he slept by a herd of cattle. A cow or bull urinated on the diseased hand, which healed at once.

== See also ==
- Arnavāz
- Noah
- Solomon

| Preceded by Tahmuras | Legendary Kings of the Shāhnāma; 100–800 (after Keyumars) | Succeeded by Zahhāk |
