= Tahmuras =

Mythological Iranian king

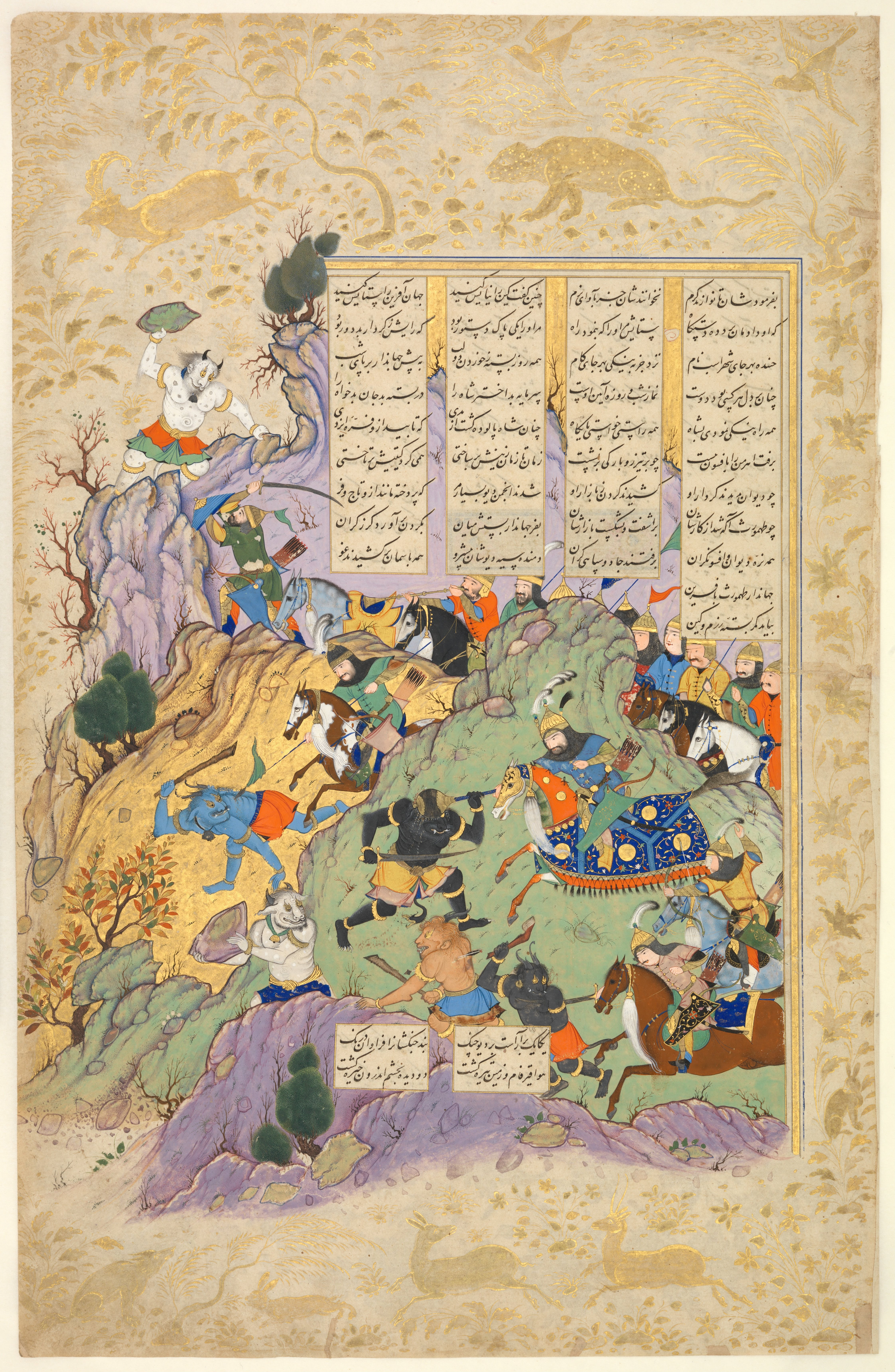
Tahmuras Defeating the Divs. Miniature by Reza Abbasi from the Shahnameh of Shah Abbas. Qazvin, c. 1590–1600. Chester Beatty Library

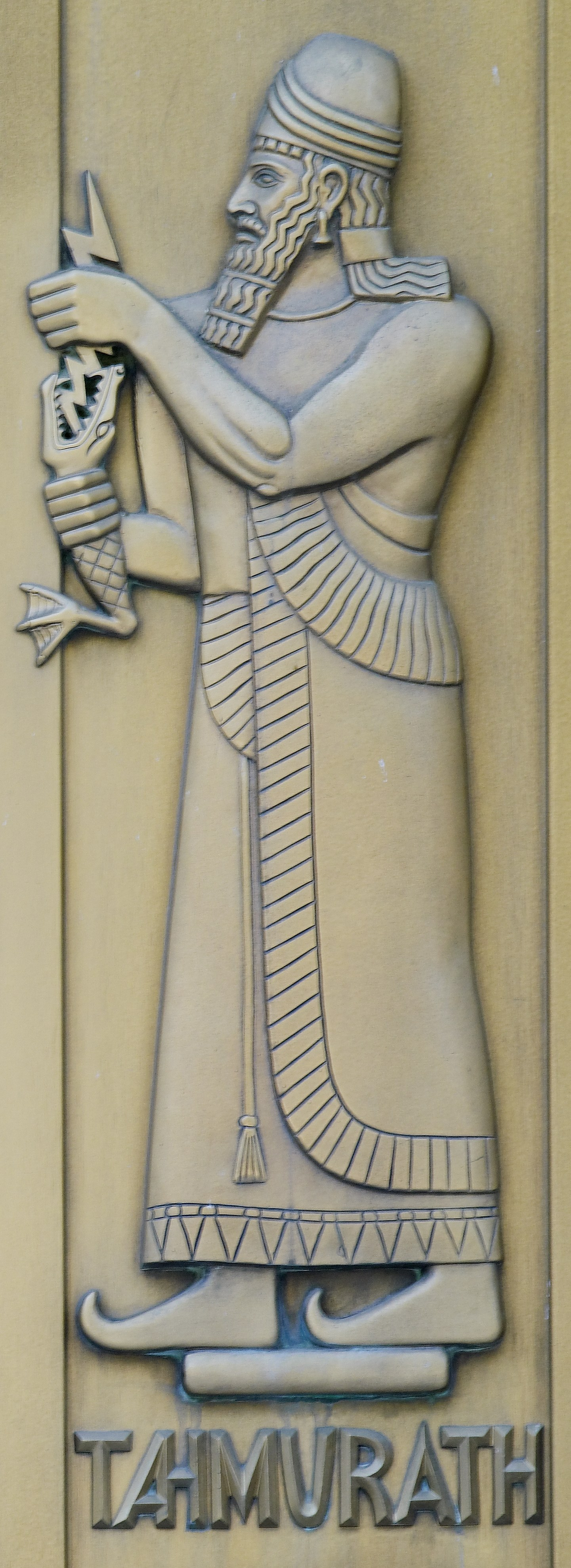
Lee Lawrie, Tahmurath (1939). Library of Congress John Adams Building, Washington, D.C.

Tahmuras or Tahmures (Persian: تهمورث, طهمورث [tʰæmures]; from Avestan Taxma Urupi "Strong Fox" via Middle Persian: 𐮑𐮇𐮋𐮅𐮊𐮎𐮀, romanized: Tahmōref) was the third Shah of the mythical Pishdadian dynasty of Iran according to Ferdowsi's epic poem, the Shahnameh. He is considered the builder of Merv.

== Tahmuras in the Shahnameh ==
Ferdowsi’s Shanameh recounts the life of Tahmouras as follows:

Tahmures was the son of Hushang. In his time the world was much troubled by the divs (demons) of Ahriman. On the advice of his vizier Shahrasp, Tahmures used magic to subdue Ahriman and made him his slave, even riding upon his back as on a horse. The demons rebelled against Tahmuras, and he made war against them with both magic and force. By magic he bound two-thirds of the demons; the remaining third he crushed with his mace. The divs now became Tahmuras's slaves and they taught him the art of writing in thirty different scripts.

Like his father, Tahmuras was a great inventor of arts for easing the human condition. He invented the spinning and weaving of wool, learned to domesticate chickens, how to store up fodder for livestock instead of merely grazing them, and how to train animals like dogs and falcons to hunt for people.

Tahmures ruled for thirty years and was succeeded by his son, Jamshid.

== Death of Taxmoras, as told in a Parsi Rivayāt ==
Georges Dumézil provides a summary of a bawdy and scatological, but nonetheless instructive account of the death of Taxmoruw (Tahmures) preserved in a Parsi «Revayat » (روایت).

This original text was translated by Danish orientalist and historian Arthur Christensen and published by Friedrich von Spiegel. This (admittedly late) text furnishes material that Dumézil considers to preserve archaic proto-Indo-European themes with a bearing on what he termed the problem of le borgne and le manchot i.e. of 'the one-eyed (god)' and 'the one-handed (god)' relating, in this instance, specifically to the mythic motif of one-handedness.

The scene for this scurrilous episode is set by the account in the Avesta of the reign of Taxma Urupi, which relates that this sovereign of the world subdued not only demons and sorcerers, but also the archfiend Angra Mainyu himself, thanks to the help of the wind god Vayu-Vata and his (Taxma Urupi's) possession of the khvarenah or mystic 'kingly glory'. Thus empowered,the king rides Ahriman for 30 years and travels across the entire earth. The rest of the story is not recounted in the Avesta.

Ahriman, exasperated at being treated like a beast of burden, won the trust of Tahmuras’s wife by gifting her jewelry. She tells him that, along the daily route, there is a specific spot on a mountain path, a particularly perilous one, where Tahmouras is seized by great anxiety. The next day, Ahriman waits to reach this critical point. At which he seizes his chance, rearing up, throwing Taxmoruw to the ground and swallowing the unfortunate king whole. Time passes, but Taxmoruw's corpse is not found, remaining in Ahriman's belly.

Meanwhile, Jamshid, Taxmoruw's devoted brother (not son, as in the Shahnameh), scours the world in search of his body until eventually he learns from Srosh, the well-nigh omniscient confidant of Ahura Mazda, that it is hidden in Ahriman's bowels. Jamshid begs Srosh to tell him some magical trick to retrieve the body from its unsavoury resting place, whereupon Srosh reveals that Ahriman loves two things above all else: music and anal sex. Acting on Srosh's advice, Jamshid then travels to the area where Ahriman is living and begins to sing. Attracted by the music, the demon duly appears and begins capering about and masturbating in anticipation of his other favourite activity.

Jamshid agrees to penetrate Ahriman on condition that he first be allowed to remove Taxmoruw's body from the demon's bowels. The excited Ahriman agrees readily to the bargain and bends over, presenting his anus, whereupon Jamshid plunges his hand up the demon's rectum, deep into his belly, quickly pulls out his brother's corpse, places it on the ground and flees. Ahriman gives chase, but Jamshid runs on and on, taking care (as instructed previously by Srosh) not to look back at his pursuer and, more especially not to look him in the face. Ahriman tires and, baulked of both pleasure and prey, descends once more into hell.

Jamshid then returns to the spot where he left Taxmoruw's body, constructs the prototypical Tower of Silence and places the body on it for excarnation by birds of prey, in the manner still considered ritually correct by Zoroastrians to this day. Thankful that he has at last been able to give his brother a fitting funeral, Jamshid can finally take time to glance at the hand which has been up Ahriman's anus and sees, to his horror, that it is pale and stinking, starting to waste away with a foul disease similar to leprosy. The disease grows steadily worse, the hand withering and growing ever more painful, and Jamshid becomes sad at his deformity, shunning human society and haunting, hermit-like, the loneliest of mountains and deserts. All, however, ends happily, for one night, as the wretched man lies asleep, an ox urinates on his blighted hand, healing it. Thus comes about the discovery of gōmēz - cow urine, considered as the purificatory liquid par excellence in Zoroastrianism and used as such in the nine-night ritual of Barashnûm, (as detailed in the ninth chapter of the Vendidad).

== Takhmurup and the Three Sacred Fires in the Bundahishn ==
According to verses 8–9 of the eighteenth chapter of the cosmological treatise known as the Bundahishn, the three preeminent Atar (Great Fires) of ancient Iran—Farnbag, Gushnasp and Burzin Mihr—were brought thither on the back of the ox Srishok from a place named Khwaniratha, during the reign of the primordial ruler Takhmurup—presumably with his knowledge and possibly at his command. The text of the Bundahishn is not easy to interpret at this point, but seems to mean that a group of men were riding beside the (Caspian?) sea on the back of the ox, transporting with them a fire altar, upon which were burning the three atar (holy fires). A storm then sprang up and the wind whipped the fire altar off Srishok's back and carried it out to sea. The three holy fires, however, were not quenched but miraculously remained burning on the waters, lighting the men (or passing seafarers?) to their (unspecified) destination. The unusual concept of fire burning in the midst of water is found also in relation to the ancient Indo-Iranian deity Apam Napat and both occurrences of the mythological motif may owe something to early observation of flames (derived from the welling up of natural hydrocarbons) hovering near the surface of the Caspian Sea—more specifically the Southwestern part, exploited currently by the Absheron gas field near Baku in Azerbaijan.

== Founding of Shiraz ==
According to certain Iranian traditions, the city of Shiraz was originally built by Tahmures. Some native writers have claimed that the name Shiraz is derived from that of Tahmuras's son.

== In Islamic sources ==
Al-Masudi writes that the founder of the Sabian religion, "Boudasf" lived during Tahmuras's reign, while Al-Tabari reports that Tahmuras reigned for 40 years, and was obedient to Allah, who had given so much power to Tahmuras that Iblis was submissive to him, and that he was the first ruler of Babylon. He also reports that Tahmuras jumped on Iblis's back and rode him around the world, and that "Bewarasb" (better known as Zahhak made propaganda for the Sabians in his first year.

Al-Maqrizi blames Tahmuras for bringing an end to Persian monotheism, the religion of Noah, as he accepted Boudasf's Sabian religion, and forced it on the people of Persia, which lasted for around a millennium until they all became Zoroastrians. Alongside this, Al-Maqrizi says that the making of idols began in Tahmuras's reign, on the other hand, fasting also originated in Tahmuras's reign, coming from a man named "Yudasf", and some even claim he was an Arab named Šadīdb.ʿĀdb.ʿAmlīq, the brother of Shaddad ibn 'Ad.

Maqrizi also records that, of the Zoroastrians who did believe in the Flood, they believed it was regional rather than global, occurring solely in Syria, and never got further than the mountains of Sarpol. Tahmuras is said to have received word of the flood 131 years in advance, he had many books wrapped in skins and placed inside of mounds to protect them from the water. These mounds were found at Jayy, near Isfahan, in the early 900s A.D, and when opened up, revealed chambers filled with numerous sacks that had been filled with tree bast of the kind one uses to wrap around bows, these strips had writing on them which no one could identify.

Al-Isfahani writes that the Sabeans began as followers of Yudasf, and were permitted to practice their religion by Tahmuras, who said "every nation likes its own creed, and therefore do not interfere with them", a custom which, according to Isfahani, was popular in India during his own time.

== See also ==
- Teimuraz (given name)

Preceded by Hushang	Legendary Kings of the Shāhnāma; 70–100 (after Keyumars)	Succeeded by Jamshid
