= Rochester Savings Bank =

Historic commercial building in New York, United States

- U.S. National Register of Historic Places
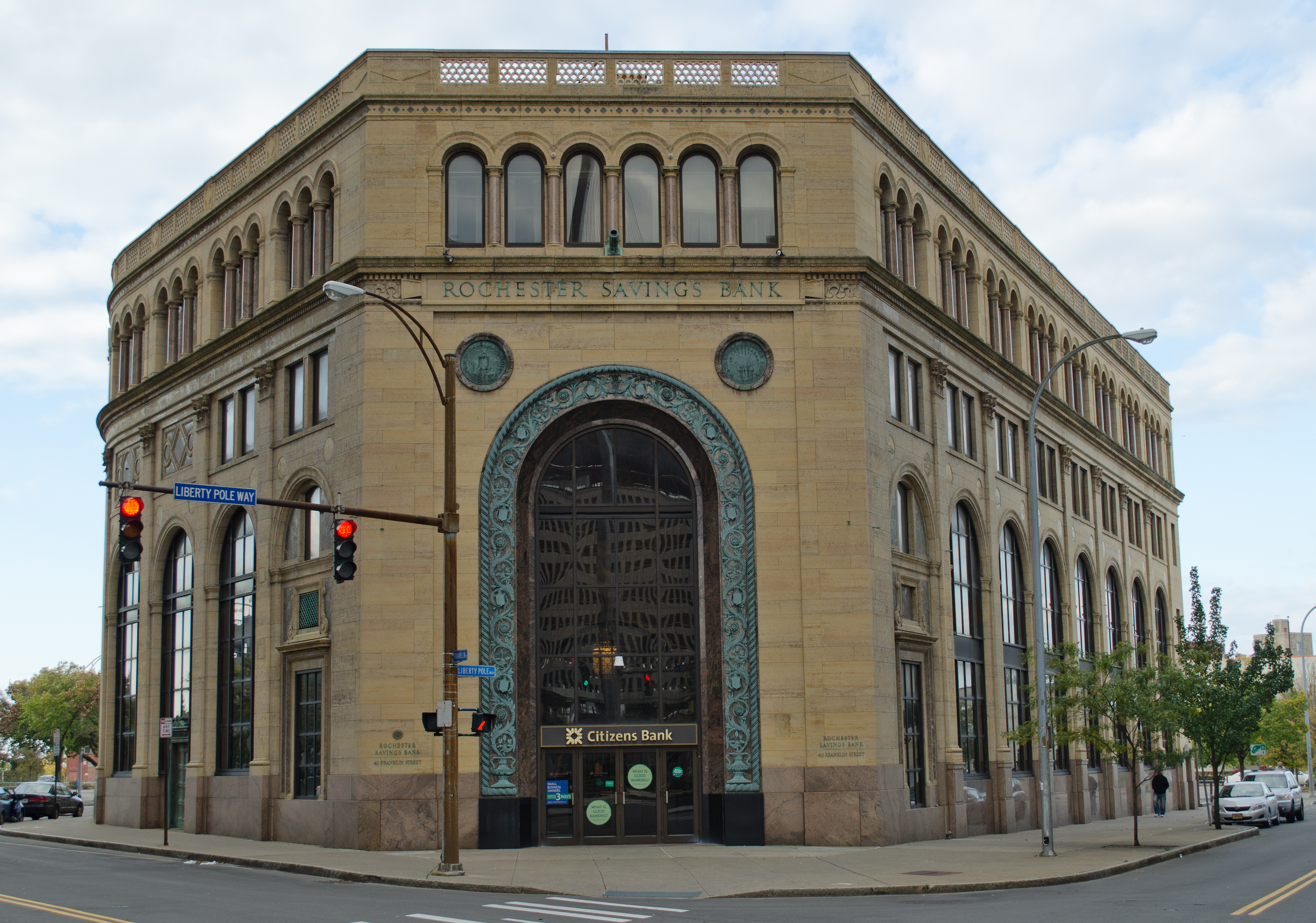
- Rochester Savings Bank, October 2012

- Location within New York Location within the United States
- Location: 40 Franklin St., Rochester, New York
- Coordinates: 43°9′31″N 77°36′18″W
- Area: 0.6 acres (0.24 ha)
- Built: 1927
- Architect: McKim, Mead & White; Warner, J. Foster
- Architectural style: Late 19th And 20th Century Revivals, Byzantine Revival
- NRHP reference No.: 72000857
- Added to NRHP: March 16, 1972

Rochester Savings Bank is a historic bank building located at Rochester in Monroe County, New York. It is a four-story, V-shaped structure, sheathed in Kato stone from Minnesota. It was designed by McKim, Mead and White and built in 1927 to house the Rochester Savings Bank. The building's banking room interior features murals painted by noted artist Ezra Winter.

It was listed on the National Register of Historic Places in 1972.

In 2011, the building was acquired by a group called Rochester Historic Ventures, which then set out to seek occupants that would allow the building to return to public use.

In October 2012, Rochester Institute of Technology announced the creation of a Center for Urban Entrepreneurship, to be housed in the Rochester Savings Bank building. The university planned to spend $3–5 million on renovations, eventually resulting in a multidisciplinary center and multiuse venue for RIT students. In 2016, after the lengthy renovation of the building, the Center for Urban Entrepreneurship opened.

== Institutional history ==
The bank was established in 1831 as the first savings (as opposed to commercial) bank west of Albany, New York. The bank moved to its own building on State Street in 1842, to a second on Main and Fitzhugh Streets in 1857, and to its final building in 1927.

Notable former board members include Colby Chandler, Marion B. Folsom, and Joseph C. Wilson.

Notable former employees include Abraham M. Schermerhorn and George Eastman.

== Gallery ==
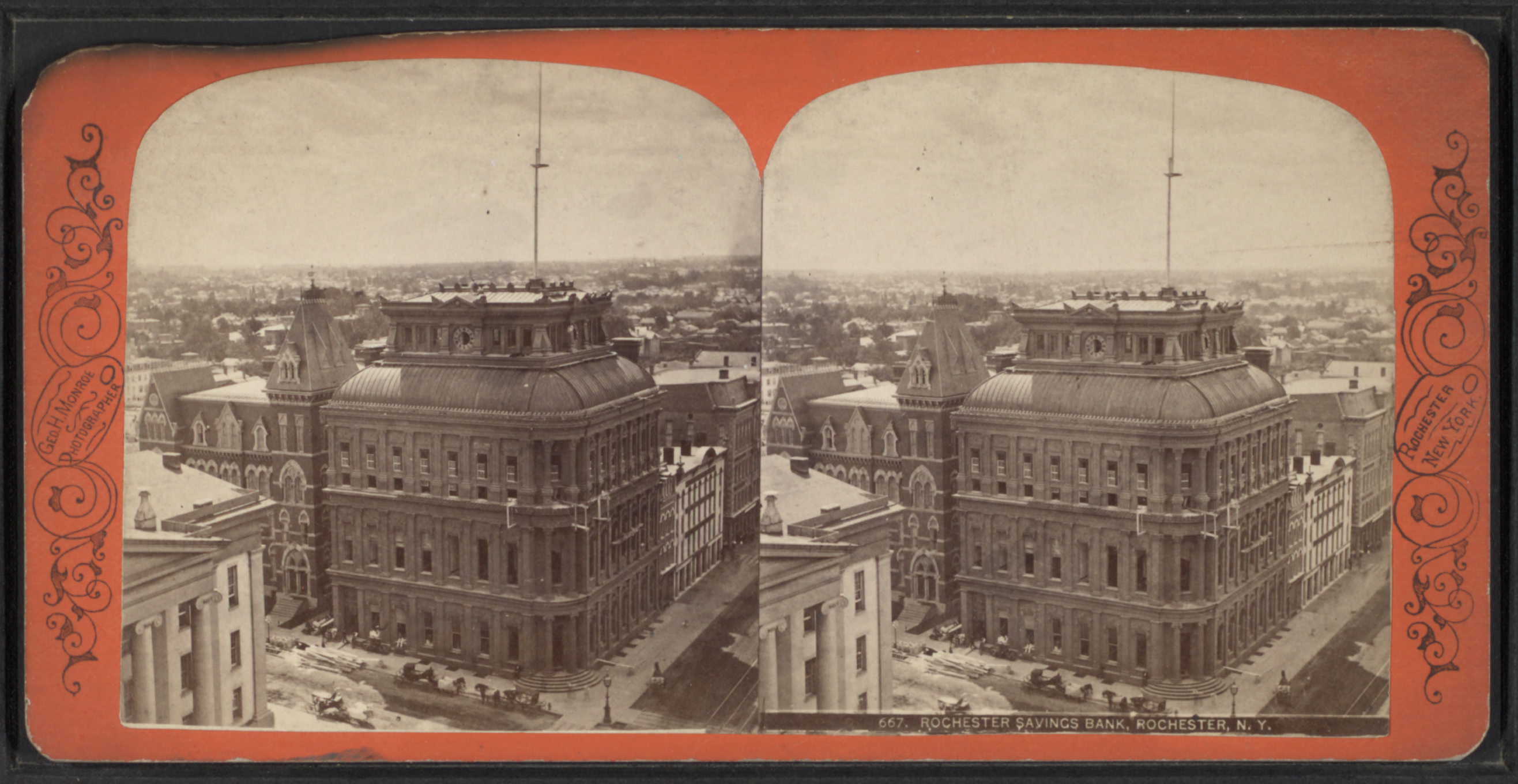
1857 bank building on the corner of Main and Fitzhugh Streets, adjacent to the Rochester Free Academy

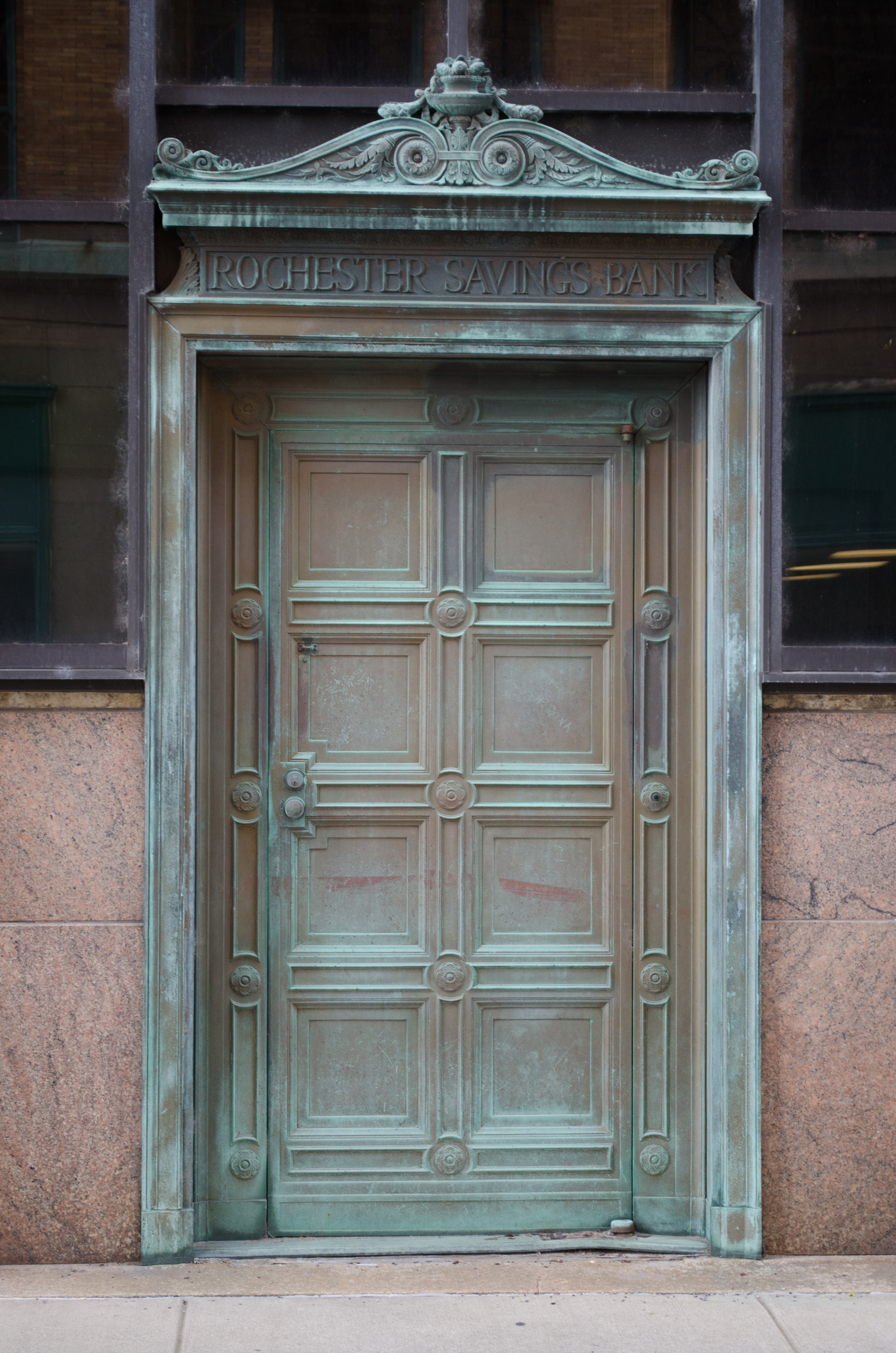
Service entrance on the west side of the bank
