= Ezra Winter =

American painter (1886–1949)

- Born: Ezra Augustus Winter; March 10, 1886; Traverse City, Michigan, U.S.
- Died: April 6, 1949 (aged 63); Falls Village, Connecticut, U.S.
- Occupation: Muralist

Ezra Augustus Winter (March 10, 1886 – April 6, 1949) was a prominent American muralist.

== Biography ==
Winter was born in Traverse City, Michigan, trained at the Chicago Academy of Fine Arts in 1908, and the American Academy in Rome in 1914. Winter became extremely successful and commanded high prices for his work. In 1924 he taught at the Grand Central School of Art.

Winter studied art at the Chicago Academy of Fine Arts and was a fellow in visual arts at the American Academy in Rome in 1914. Among his best-known works are The Canterbury Tales in the Library of Congress and Fountain of Youth in the foyer of Radio City Music Hall. He also completed murals for the U.S. Supreme Court, the U.S. Chamber of Commerce, the University of Rochester and Eastman School of Music, and a six-story work for the Guardian Building in Detroit. During World War I Winter was a camouflage designer for the U.S. Shipping Board. He later taught at the Grand Central School of Art and kept a studio in Falls Village, Connecticut. Winter was associated with the National Society of Mural Painters and the Architectural League of New York. He served on the Connecticut State Commission of Sculpture and the U.S. Commission of Fine Arts, from 1928 to 1933, and was a member of the National Institute of Arts and Letters. His papers are in the Archives of American Art at the Smithsonian Institution.

While painting one of his murals, Ezra Winter took a step back, forgetting the extreme height at which he was at, and fell. He suffered from a broken and compacted tailbone. After this he was unable to paint because of an unsteady hand and pain because of the accident. Winter killed himself in 1949 with a shotgun near his Connecticut studio at the age of 63.

== Works ==
His work includes:

- Fountain of Youth mural at the Radio City Music Hall in Rockefeller Center
- the George Rogers Clark National Historical Park in Vincennes, Indiana
- the Rochester Savings Bank in Rochester, New York
- wall murals James Monroe High School in Rochester, New York
- trading floor murals for the New York Cotton Exchange, New York City, for architect Donn Barber, 1923
- a spectacular six-story banking hall mural for the Guardian Building, and work for the Buhl Building, both in Detroit and both for architect Wirt C. Rowland
- numerous murals at the Birmingham Public Library in Birmingham, Alabama
- Thomas Jefferson and Canterbury Tales murals, Library of Congress John Adams Building, Washington, D.C.
- Murals in Willard Straight Hall lobby, Cornell University, 1926. The murals depict representations of virtues including chivalry, adventure, diplomacy, creativity, and optimism.
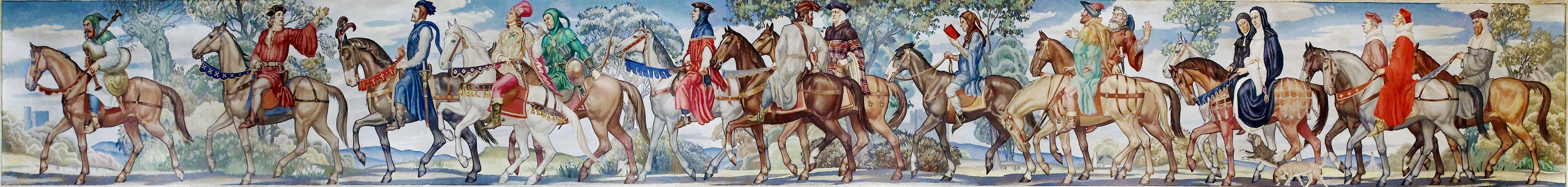
Ezra Winter's Canterbury Tales mural (1939), Library of Congress John Adams Building, Washington, D.C.

== George Rogers Clark National Historical Park ==
Winter did seven murals at the George Rogers Clark National Historical Park.

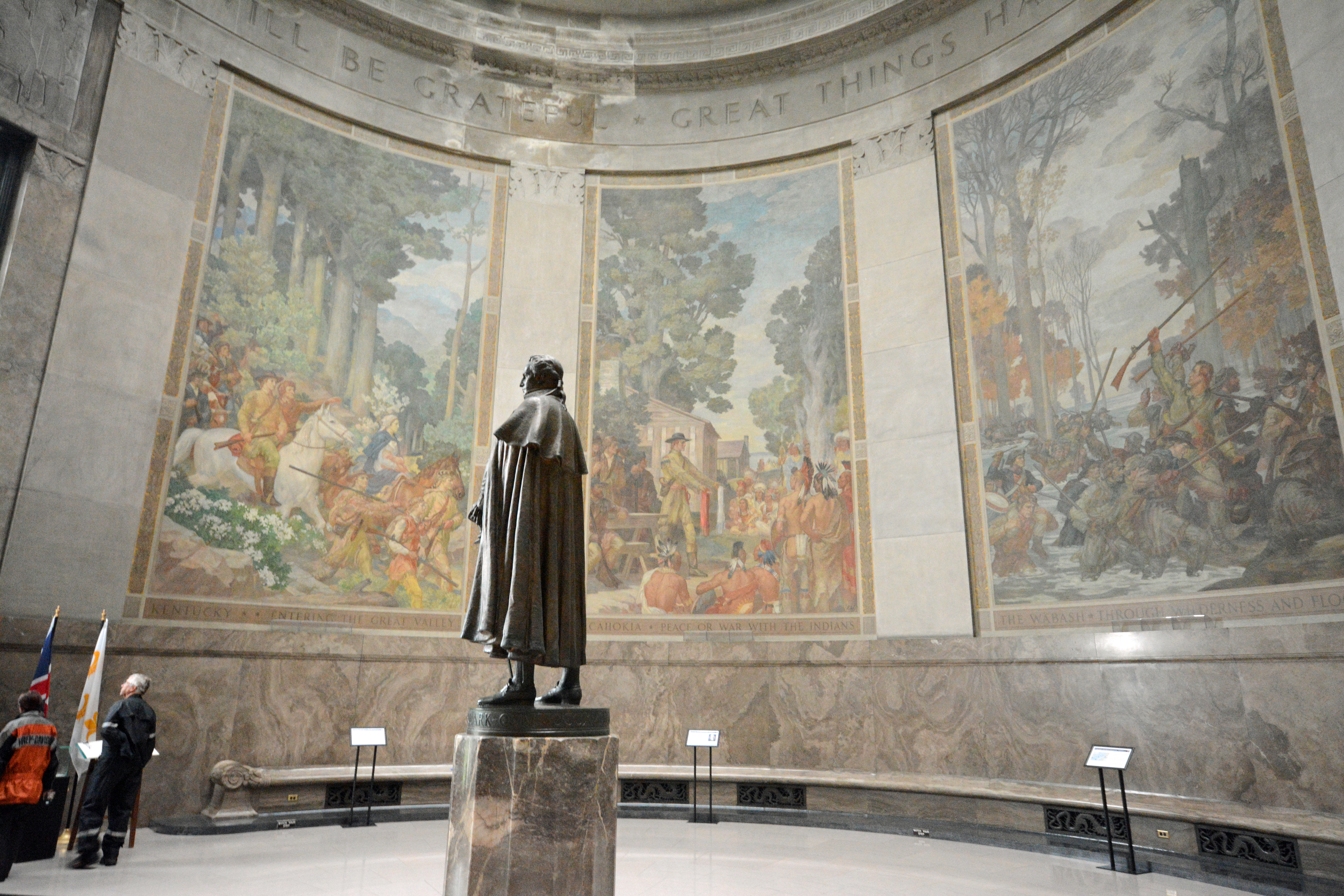
Murals to the left

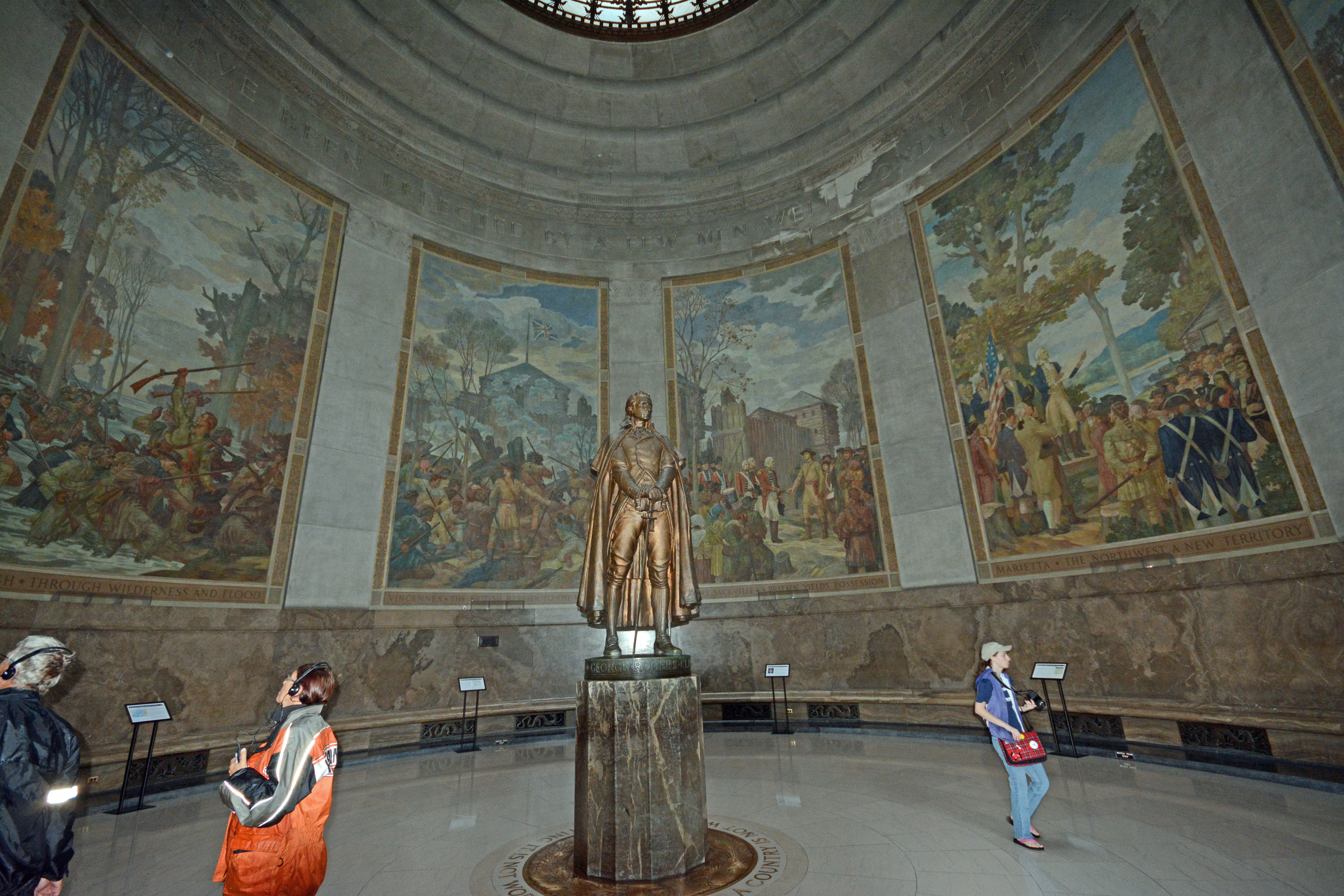
Statue and murals in the center

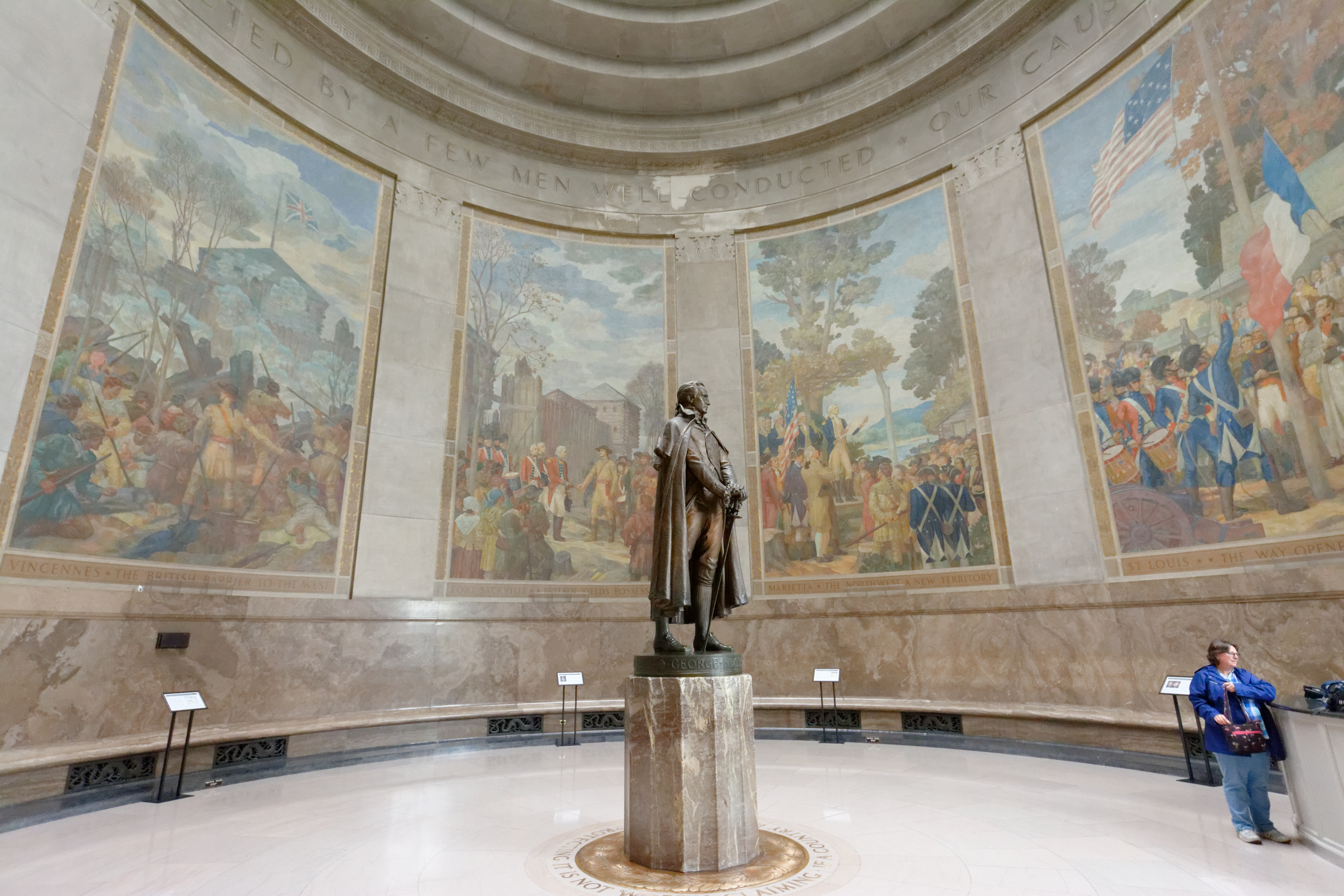
Murals to the right
