= John Adams Building =

Second-oldest building of the Library of Congress

Coordinates: 38.8885°N 77.0027°W

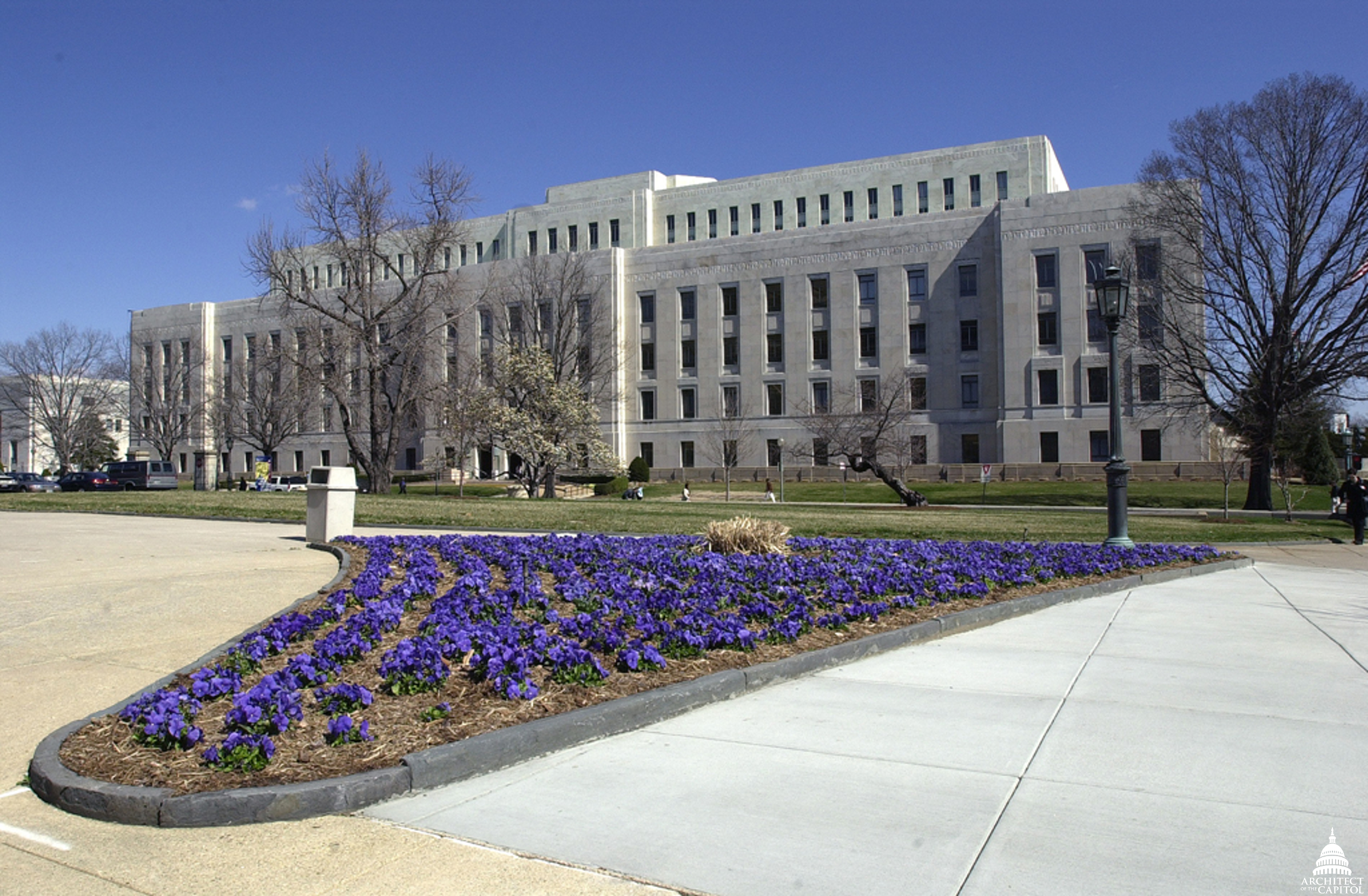
The John Adams Building of the Library of Congress

The John Adams Building is the second-oldest of the buildings of the Library of Congress of the United States. Built in the 1930s, it is named for John Adams, the second president, who signed the law creating the Library of Congress in 1800. The building is in the Capitol Hill district of Washington D.C. next to the library's main building (now known as the Thomas Jefferson Building) in the Capitol Complex. The Adams building opened to the public on April 5, 1939, and before being named for the president in 1980, was simply called The Annex building. It is designed in a restrained but very detailed Art Deco style and faced in white Georgia marble. It is located on Second Street SE between Independence Avenue and East Capitol Street in Washington, DC.

== History ==
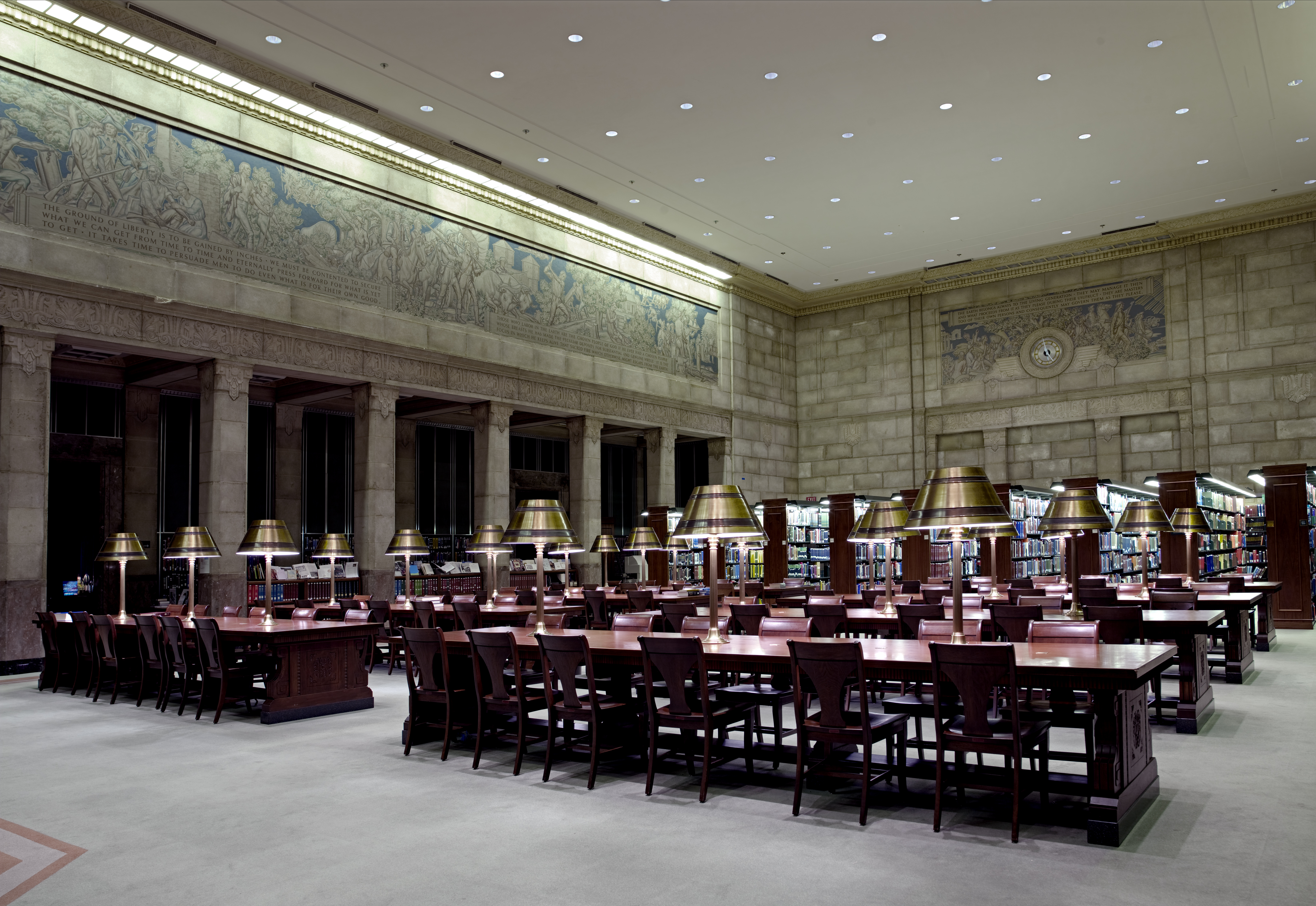
Adams Building - South Reading Room, with murals by Ezra Winter

Exterior detail near an entrance

The idea to construct a new library building was presented to the United States Congress in 1928 at the urging of Librarian of Congress Herbert Putnam. The bill was sponsored by U.S. Representative Robert Luce, chairman of the House Committee on the Library. On June 13, 1930, $6.5 million was appropriated for the building's construction, for a tunnel connecting it to the Main Building, and for changes in the east front of the Main Building, including the construction of a Rare Book Room. An additional appropriation approved on June 6, 1935, brought the total authorization to $8,226,457.

Architect of the Capitol David Lynn took charge of the project and commissioned the Washington, D.C. architectural firm of Pierson & Wilson to design the building, with Alexander Buel Trowbridge as consulting architect. The contract stipulated completion by June 24, 1938, but the building was not ready for occupancy until December 2, 1938. The move of the Card Division started on December 12. The new building opened to staff on January 3, 1939, and the Reading Rooms opened to the public on April 5, 1939. It also housed the United States Copyright Office through the middle of the 20th century

The building is five stories in height above ground, with the fifth story set back 35 feet (11 m). It contains 180 miles (290 km) of shelving (compared to 104 miles (167 km) in the Jefferson Building) and can hold ten million volumes. There are 12 tiers of stacks, extending from the cellar to the fourth floor. Each tier provides about 13 acres (53,000 m^{2}) of shelf space.

On April 13, 1976, in a ceremony at the Jefferson Memorial marking the birthday of Thomas Jefferson, President Gerald Ford signed into law the act to change the name of the Library of Congress Building to the Library of Congress Thomas Jefferson Building. On June 13, 1980, the Adams building acquired its present name, which honors John Adams, the former President of the United States who in 1800 approved the law establishing the Library of Congress.

The building is faced in white Georgia marble and incorporated the use of new materials at the time such as acoustical block, formica, vitrolite, and glass tubing.

== Bronze entrance doors by Lee Lawrie ==
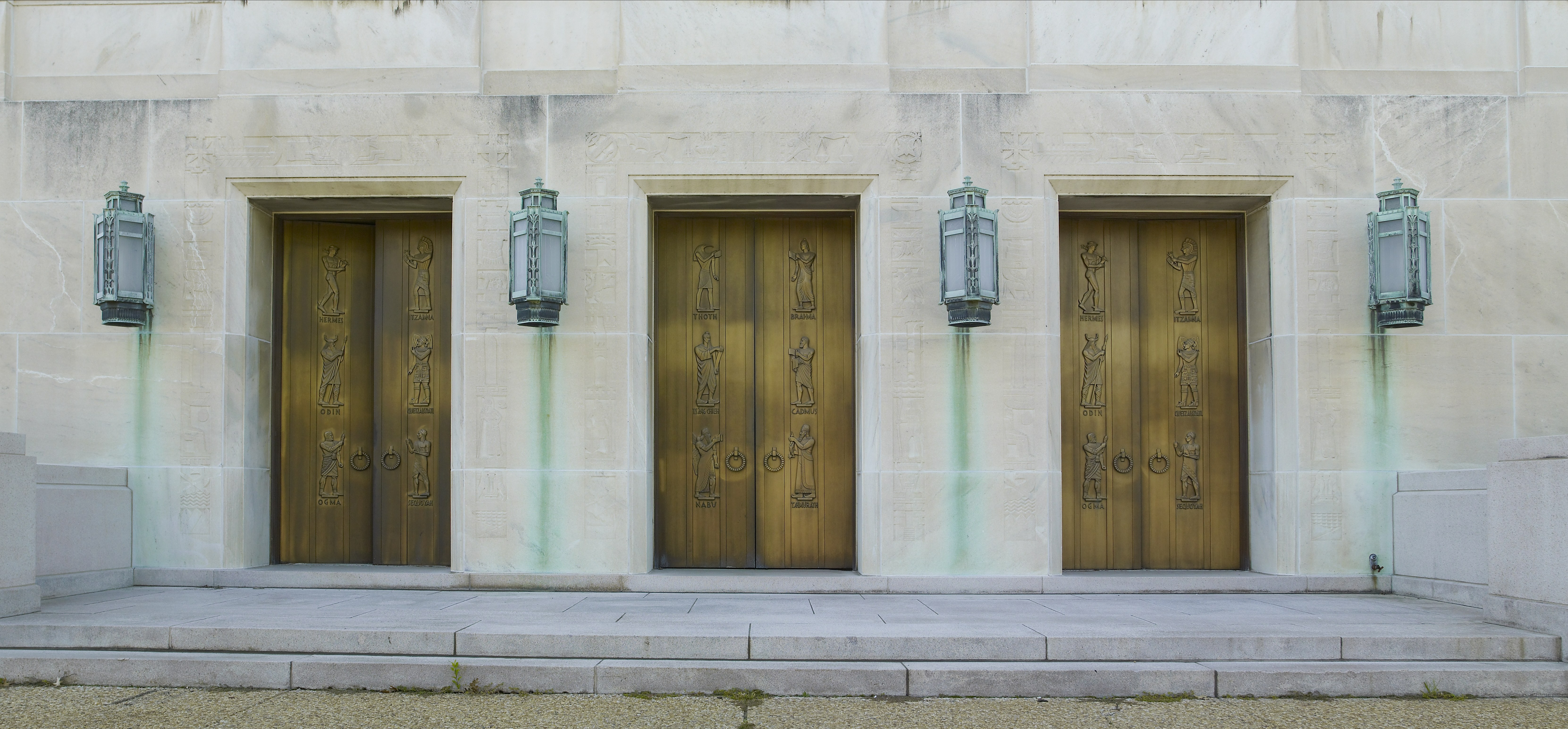
Lee Lawrie, sculpted bronze figures, east entrance doors

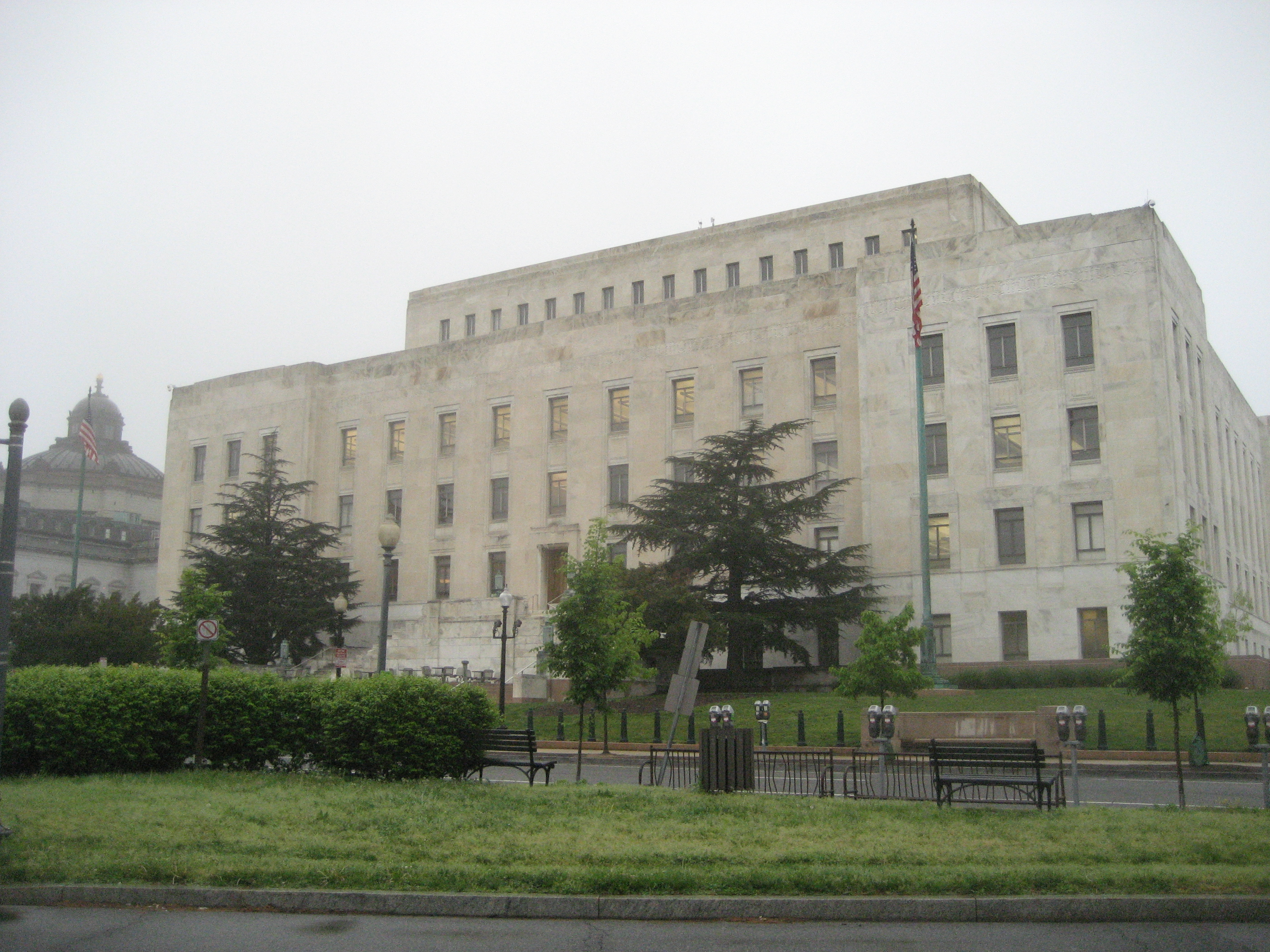
Adams Building from the south – part of the Library's Thomas Jefferson Building can be seen at left

The building's western (2nd Street SE) and eastern (3rd Street SE) entrances feature three sets of bronze double-doors, each adorned with raised reliefs designed by sculptor Lee Lawrie, depicting various figures associated with the history and creation of writing.

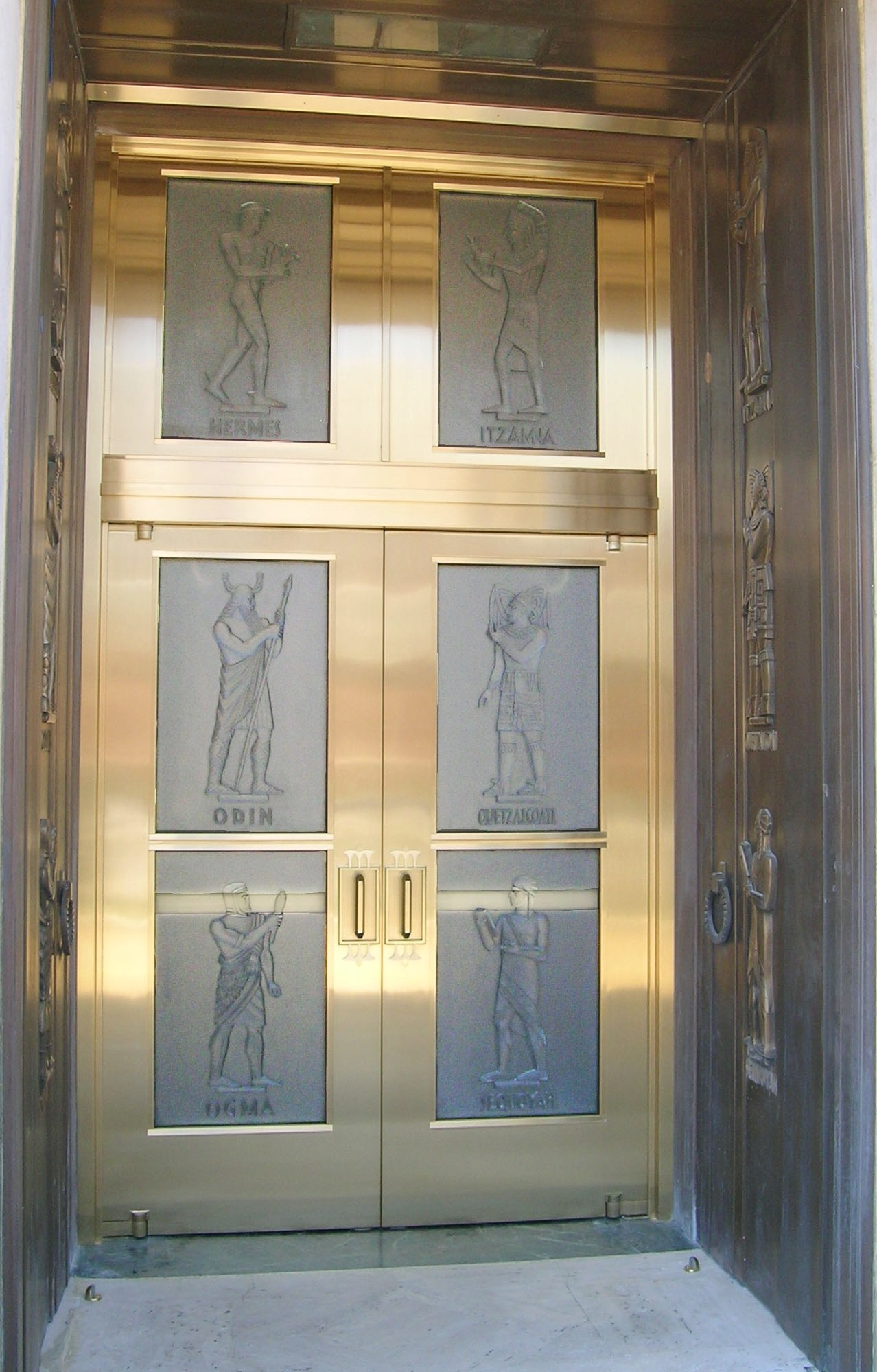
Monumental Glass Doors at Library of Congress John Adams Building, installed in 2013 in part to protect the original bronze doors, which they mimic in design

The deities and heroes represented on the doors are:

- Hermes - the Greek messenger of the gods
- Odin - a Norse/Germanic god and creator of the runic alphabet
- Ogma - the Irish god of learning and inventor of the Gaelic Ogham alphabet
- Itzamna - a Mayan god of creation who invented writing
- Quetzalcoatl - central god of the Aztecs, patron of writing and learning
- Sequoyah - the Native American scholar who invented the written Cherokee syllabary (notably the only representation of a historical person)
- Thoth - the Egyptian god of knowledge, scribe of the gods
- Ts'ang Chieh (Cangjie) - the legendary inventor of Chinese characters
- Nabu - the Babylonian/Assyrian god of scribes, writing, and literacy
- Brahma - the Hindu creator god, author of the Vedas
- Cadmus - the legendary hero who imported the Phoenician alphabet to the ancient Greeks
- Tahmurath (Tahmuras) - a mythical Persian king who learned thirty written languages

The entryways to the John Adams Building were modified in 2013 with the addition of code-compliant, sculpted glass doors that replicate the original bronze reliefs by Lawrie. The original doors are held fully open within the vestibule of each entry, flanking the new monumental doors made by the Washington Glass Studio and Fireart Glass.

The south entrance doors (not currently used) facing Independence Avenue are reached by a stairway decorated with stylized owls and lamps. On the doors are a male figure representing physical labor and a female figure representing intellectual labor. Before it moved to expanded quarters in the James Madison Memorial Building, this was the entrance for the United States Copyright Office, which is under the jurisdiction of the Librarian of Congress.

== See also ==
- James Madison Memorial Building
- Thomas Jefferson Building
- National Audio-Visual Conservation Center
