= Hushang =

Mythological Iranian king

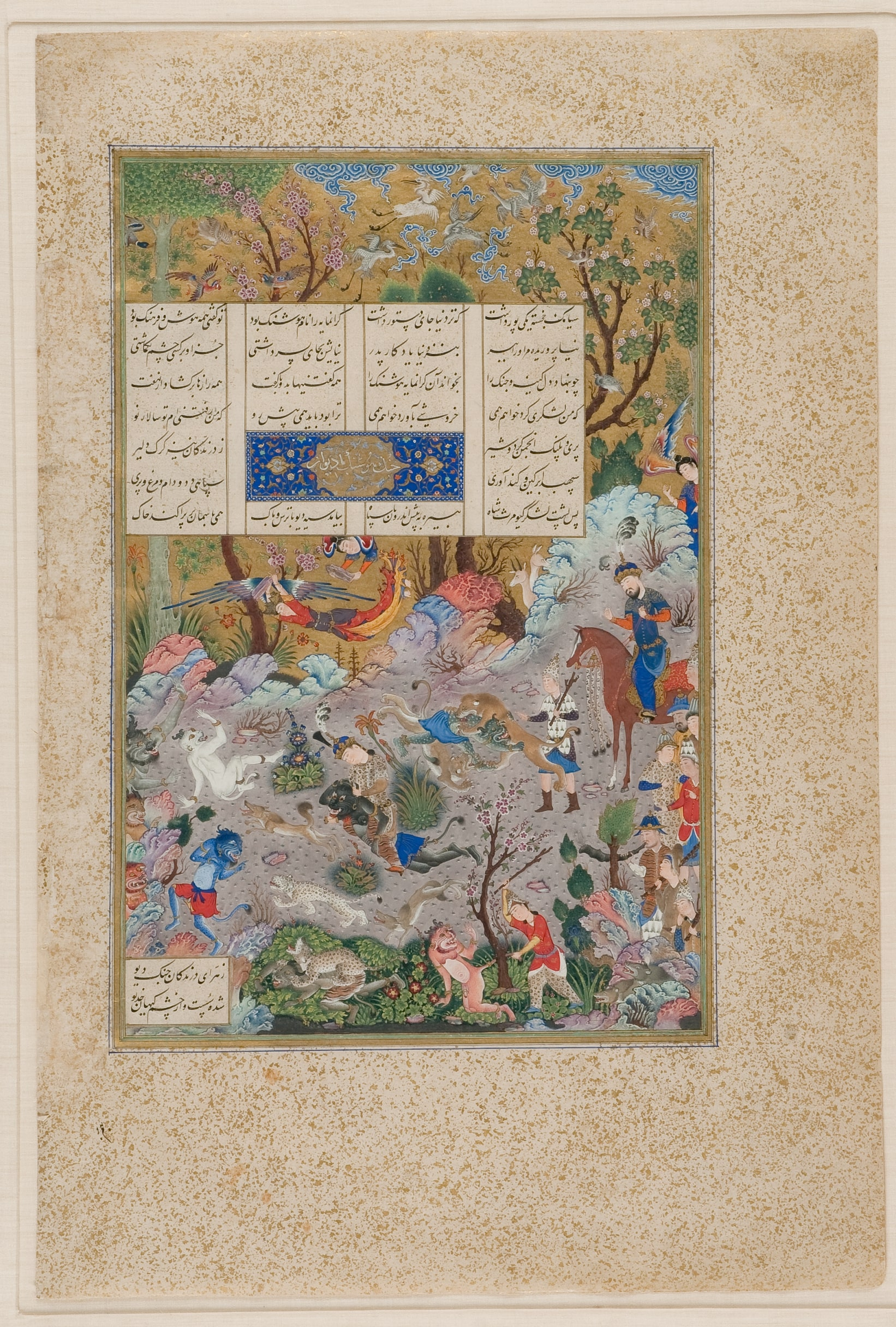
Hushang Slays the Black Div. Miniature by Sultan Mohammed from the Shahnameh of Shah Tahmasp

Hūshang (Persian: هوشنگ, romanized: Hōšang; Middle Persian: Hōšang, Avestan: 𐬵𐬀𐬊𐬱𐬌𐬌𐬀𐬢𐬵𐬀, romanized: Haošyaŋha), also spelled Hōshang, is an early hero-king in Iranian mythical history. He is known from Avestan, Middle Persian, and Sasanian-based Persian and Arabic sources. He appears to have been one of several 'first man/king' figures in different Iranian traditions, along with Jamshid, Keyumars, and Tahmuras. In the Avesta, he is called Haoshyangha and is given the epithet Paradhāta, whence Persian pishdad. While this title is given only to Hushang in the Avesta, in later tradition the first Iranian dynasty (the Pishdadians), including Hushang's predecessor and successors, are called by this title. According to Ferdowsi's Shahnameh, which drew from the traditional history developed in the late Sasanian period, Hushang was the second king of the Pishdadian dynasty and the grandson of the first man and king Keyumars.

== Etymology ==
In the Avesta, Hushang is called Haoshyangha (𐬵𐬀𐬊𐬱𐬌𐬌𐬀𐬢𐬵𐬀 Haošyaŋha). Older sources interpreted the second part of the name as -šyaŋh, composed of ši- 'dwelling' and -aŋh 'giving rise to', thus meaning 'he who produces good dwellings' or 'promoter of culture and sedentary living'. According to another interpretation, the second part of the name is -šiiah-, a variant of čiia- 'selecting, deciding', giving the whole name *hu-šiiah- the meaning 'good (religious) choice'. Hushang's epithet Paradhāta/Pishdad (Pēšdād) was interpreted in Sasanian times as meaning 'he who first set the law of sovereignty', which has been accepted by some modern scholars. Others interpret the name as meaning 'set at the beginning' in the sense of 'first man'. Some have noted the similarity between the name Paradhāta and Paralatos, the name of the progenitor of the Paralatae or "Royal Scythians" who was a grandson of Targitaus, the first man according to Scythian mythology. Hushang is called Ushanj or Ushhanj in Arabic sources.

== Sources ==
Hushang is known from Avestan, Middle Persian, and Sasanian-based Persian and Arabic sources. Within the Avesta, the main collection of sacred texts of Zoroastrianism, he is mentioned in the Yashts and in the Vendidad. The 10th-century Middle Persian Denkard summarizes Chihrdad, a lost book (nask) of the Avesta, which mentions Hushang. The Bundahishn, a Middle Persian compilation, also mentions Hushang. Arabic-language sources such as al-Tabari's chronicle, al-Tha'alibi's Ghurar akhbār mulūk al-Furs wa-siyarihim, and al-Biruni's The Remaining Signs of Past Centuries give information about Hushang. The story of Hushang is given in Ferdowsi's Shahnameh. Hushang has no equivalent in the Indian tradition and is therefore considered a purely Iranian figure.

== Traditions ==
Hushang's original status is uncertain. He appears to have been one of several 'first man/king' figures in different Iranian traditions, along with Jamshid, Gayomard/Keyumars, and Tahmuras. The more prevalent tradition attested in Ferdowsi's Shahnameh makes Hushang the successor of Gayomard, but Hushang's status as the first king is directly stated in some sources and implied by others. In the older Yashts, the lists of heroes or kings who received divine favor always begin with Hushang. This suggests that Hushang was considered the first king of the world at the time of the Yashts' creation. Several later sources associate Hushang with the beginning of Iranian sovereignty. Hushang's epithet Paradhāta/Pishdad, which is only applied to him in the Avesta, is later used for the first Iranian dynasty, the Pishdadians, which includes Hushang's predecessor and successors. In the Middle Persian Bundahishn, Hushang is referred to as the progenitor of the Iranians and the first ruler of the Seven Climes. Additionally, despite placing Hushang after Keyumars, the Shahnameh uses the phrase "down from the time of Hushang" to mean "from the first king" and quotes Khosrow Parviz as calling the Iranian religion "the Creed of Hushang."

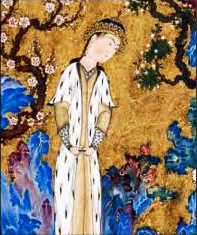
Painting of Hushang in the Shahnameh of Shah Tahmasp

In a different (and, according to A. Shapour Shahbazi, likely older) tradition recorded in the Fravardin Yasht, the list of kings begins with Yima (Jamshid) and ends with Kavi Hausrava (Kay Khosrow), then lists "Hushang the Valiant [taxma-]" as one of several venerated heroes. In both traditions, he is said to have defeated demons (daēvas). In the old Yashts, particularly in the Aban Yasht, Hushang is depicted as a great king who made sacrifices to the gods and received from them the khvarenah (divine royal glory), then with the gods' assistance defeated the daēvas (demons or false gods) and their worshippers in Mazana and Varena, located on the western and eastern edges, respectively, of the land of the Aryans. He is said to have defeated princes and priests who opposed him. The Yashts give no information about Hushang's genealogy, and there is great variety in the later sources on this issue. Besides Ferdowsi's Shahnameh, most other sources place three generations (Mashya, Siamak and Fravak) between Hushang and Gayomard. In the summary of the lost book of the Avesta Chihrdad in the Denkard, he is made a son of Mashya and grandson of Gayomard. The Bundahishn calls him the son of Fravak, grandson of Siamak, great-grandson of Mashya, and great-great-grandson of Gayomard.

In Ferdowsi's Shahnameh, Hushang is the son of Siamak and the grandson of Gayomard, the first man and king of the world. He served his grandfather as a beloved advisor. Siamak was killed by demons, but was avenged by Hushang, who acquired the divine glory, subdued the forces of Ahriman, and succeeded his grandfather Gayomard, reigning for forty years. He was succeeded by Tahmuras, who is Hushang's son in the Shahnameh and the son of Vivanghan and the descendant of Hushang in other sources. He is credited with the invention of iron-working, architecture, the domestication of beasts, irrigation, and agriculture. A later addition to the Shahnameh, believed to be a popular story, also credits Hushang with the accidental discovery of fire, which happened after he hurled a flint rock to kill a venomous black serpent. Missing the serpent, the rock struck another flint to produce fiery sparks. Hushang learned how to make fire this way and taught his people. In honor of the discovery, they established the Sadeh festival. He is sometimes regarded as the founder of Susa and Babylon and the initiator of the festivals of Tirgan and Khorram-ruz. Hisham ibn al-Kalbi called Hushang a descendant of Noah through his son Sam.

According to Al-Maqrizi, some Persian genealogists claimed that Hushang was identical to Mahalalel. Maqrizi also mentions that some Persians said that Hushang at one point lived in India, and went to various countries. According to Hamza al-Isfahani, the Persians identified Hushang and his brother "Wikart" as prophets, and that Hushang was crowned in Istakhr.

Preceded by Keyumars	Legendary Kings of the Shahnameh; 30–70 (after Keyumars)	Succeeded by Tahmuras
