= Neryosang =

Messenger god of Zoroastrianism and protector of lineages

Neryosang Avestan: 𐬥𐬀𐬌𐬭𐬌𐬌𐬋⸱𐬯𐬀𐬢𐬵𐬀
- Herald of Ohrmazd, protector of lineages
- 13th-14th century depiction of Manichaean Neryosang alongside The Mother and The Living Spirit
- Other names: Narses, Narisaf, Narsieh, Narsi, Nairyosangha, Narasa, Narseos, Narseh, Narsaios
- Affiliation: Zoroastrian Yazata, Manichaean pantheon, Armenian pantheon
- Symbol: Youthful boy of fifteen, fire
- Attributes: Divine messenger, associated with prayer and sacred fire, protector of primordial human seed, guardian of the Kayanian lineage, preserver of Zarathustra's seed, god of beauty
- Texts: Avesta, Bundahišn, Dēnkard, Wizīdagīhā ī Zādspram
- Gender: Male
- Associated deities: Sraosha, Faravahar, Asha, Burz Yazad

Equivalents
- Greek: Hermes
- Armenian: Tir
- Indian: Vishakha, Narasamsa
- Manichaeism: The third messenger

Neryosang, also known as Nairyosangha (Avestan: Nairiiō.saŋha), Narisaf Yazad (Parthain: nrysfyzd) or Narseh (Persian: نرسه) is a yazata and messenger god in Zoroastrianism associated with prayer, ritual fire and the preservation of spiritual and dynastic lineage and continuity. Zoroastrian texts describe him conveying divine commands, accompanying the fravahr of Zoroaster and safeguarding the seed of both Keyumars, the primordial man, and Zoroaster, whose future descendants will take part in renewing the world. He is the tutelary deity of the Kayanian royal line, and his appearance as Narasa at the Kushan sanctuary of Rabatak has been interpreted as a possible extension of his royal-protective role. His Vedic counterpart is Narāśaṃsa, while Iranian Manichaean texts apply forms of his name to the Third Messenger, a figure of cosmic redemption.

== Name and etymology ==
The Avestan name of Neryosang is Nairiiō.saŋha (also written Nairyō.saŋha), commonly interpreted as meaning "of manly utterance" and compared with Vedic Narāśaṃsa. The name is attested in Middle Persian as Nēryōsang and in Bactrian as Narasa (ναρασαο, Narasao). The related form Narišanka also occurs in early Old Persian personal names. These historical forms and their linguistic interpretations are distinct from the name used for the deity in Manichaean texts. Among his Avestan epithets is huraodha, "of lovely form". Mary Boyce connected this description with later stories that dwell on the deity's beauty. Another epithet, xšaθrō.naptar, means "son of the kingdom" and belongs to the royal associations developed in the Zoroastrian tradition.

The deity's name has also been used as a theophoric name, most famously by the seventh Sasanian Shahanshah Narseh. In the inscriptions of Shapur I at Naqsh-e Rostam and Narseh at Paikuli, the name is recorded as nrshy in Middle Persian and nryshw in Parthian. The Greek version of Shapur's inscription gives Narsaiēs or Narsaios, whereas other Greek sources generally use Narsēs. Additional forms include Latin Narseus, Syriac ܢܪܣܝ (Nrsy), Arabic نرسي (Narsi), Armenian Nerseh, and Coptic Narsaph or Narseos.

== Character and functions ==
Neryosang acts as a divine messenger in Zoroastrian literature. In the Vidēvdād, he is called the messenger of Ohrmazd and is represented addressing Zoroaster after the souls of righteous people have gathered in the divine realm. He is also associated with Soroush, another divinity connected with prayer, and appears with Soroush and Mithra in Yašt 10.52. One such episode occurs in the Pahlavi account of the conversion of Vishtasp, the king who accepted Zoroaster's teaching. In the Dēnkard, Bahman is named first among the divine figures involved, while Ardawahisht serves as spokesman. Ohrmazd sends Neryosang to Ardawahisht with a message, it is Ardawahisht, acting on that message, who secures the king's final acceptance of the faith.

Neryosang is also a divinity of prayer, particularly associated with the fire before which Zoroastrian prayers are recited. Boyce regarded his strongest connections as those with fire and Soroush, while also noting his occasional association with Mithra and Apam Napat. The Pahlavi Bundahishn further places Neryosang among divine helpers of Ardawahisht, the principle of truth and right order, while its list connects Soroush's, and by extension Neryosang's guardianship of prayer with the guardianship of fire. Yasna 71.23 lists Fire, the barəsman (sacrificial twigs), Apam Napat, Neryosang and Dāmōiš Upamana among the objects of veneration. The corresponding four-part core sequence - Fire, barəsman, Apam Napat and Neryosang - has been analyzed alongside Vedic sacrificial lists. Apam Napat, the "Son of the Waters", was also known in later Iranian usage as Burz or Borz, the "High One", thus the association with Burz is an association with the deity named Apam Napat in the Avestan list. Neryosang also appears in the fire-related invocations of the two Sī-rōzag texts and the Ātaš Niyāyišn, where he is named with Kay Khosrow and the Kayanian xwarrah (royal glory).

Neryosang' connection with the fravahrs, the protective pre-existent spirits of the righteous, appears in several different settings. One Avestan account assigns him a role in protecting Zoroaster's fravahr. In the later story of the prophet's coming into the world, his fravahr first exists in a form like that of the Amahraspands. Neryosang and Jamshid, the king of the primeval paradise, escort it to a hōm (haoma) stalk fashioned by Bahman and Ardawahisht. The stalk, described as a beautiful plant as tall as a man, receives the spirit and is brought from the realm of endless light to earth, where it is placed on a tall tree. The Vidēvdād presents a different association, involving the souls of the righteous dead rather than the prophet's pre-existent spirit. They proceed toward Ohrmazd, the Amahraspands, golden seats and the House of Praise. In the following passage, righteous men gather with Neryosang, who speaks as the messenger of Mazda. This juxtaposition has been connected in comparative scholarship with an Indo-Iranian concern for ancestors and their cult, though the ancestral interpretation is distinct from the text's description of the souls' arrival. Neryosang also guards the seed from which the first human pair emerges. According to the Greater Bundahishn, after the Evil Spirit kills Keyumars (Gayō-marətan), the sun purifies the first man's seed. Neryosang safeguards part of it, while another part is entrusted to the earth. After forty years, a rhubarb plant grows from the earth and gradually becomes Mašya and Mašyānag, the first mortal man and woman.

The Pahlavi accounts give Neryosang a comparable, though separate, responsibility toward Zoroaster's descendants. The Greater Bundahishn relates that the prophet had intercourse three times with his third wife, Hvōvī, and on each occasion his seed fell to the ground. Neryosang gathered the light and power of the seed and entrusted them to Anahita, the divinity of the waters. The text appoints 99,999 fravahrs of the righteous to guard the deposits against destruction by the Divs. Anahita preserves the seed in Lake Kayānsih (Avestan Kąsaoya), where another passage describes three lights shining beneath the water. The future birth of three sons is tied to three maidens mentioned in Yašt 13.142, each will enter and bathe in the lake, conceive a son of Zoroaster and bear a figure who furthers the eventual renewal of the world. The Dēnkard and the Pahlavi Rivāyat develop this sequence of future saviors. Other Pahlavi passages distinguish the deposit of the prophet's seed from the deposit of his xwarrah by Anahita, and the tradition associates both with Lake Kayānsih. The preparation for the first of these future births appears in accounts of Pešōtan. Accompanied by 150 righteous men, he is expected to restore order and the faith with the aid of Neryosang, Soroush, Mithra, Rahn, Bahram, Arshtad and Khwarrah. Once the world has been cleansed, in a restoration likened to the earlier work of Fereydun on behalf of Zoroaster, the way is prepared for Ušēdar (Avestan Uxšyat.ərəta), the first future savior born from Zoroaster's seed.

The Bundahishn describes Neryosang as a messenger who helps the kays (Kayanian kings) and the heroes, increases their family or seed (tōhmag), and assists them in sustaining and ordering the world. It also credits him with calling forth the Kayanian family from the lineage of the divine beings. In the Dēnkard, the current king's xwarrah is linked to that of the ancient Kays, and Neryosang appears as a guardian of their kinship, lineage and inherited royal glory. The genealogical material connects this royal seed to the beginnings of humanity. The Dēnkard traces the seed of Kay Kawād, which Neryosang is said to have brought about, back to Keyumars. In the Bundahishn, the Kayanian line is associated with the Kayanian xwarrah, while a traditional wordplay derives its family seed from Lake Kayānsē, the same lake in which the seed of Zoroaster was preserved. A narrative attributed to the lost Avestan Sūdgar Nask and preserved in the Dēnkard shows how the future of the royal line could restrain the deity himself. Neryosang intends to kill the Kay Kawus for his arrogance, but the pre-existent fravahr of the future king Khusraw intervenes. The spirit explains that Kawus must live so that his son Siyavash can be born and, through him, Khusraw himself. It addresses Neryosang as an "increaser of the world" while preventing the killing that would break the future line and eliminate the destined judge of Tūrān.

In Bactrian evidence, the deity appears as Narasa or Narasao. The Rabatak inscription of the Kushan king Kanishka includes him among seven divinities honored at the sanctuary, although he is otherwise unattested in the surviving Bactrian sources. The sanctuary was especially associated with Umma and also held statues of Kanishka, his father and his grandfather. On this basis, Gherardo Gnoli suggested that Narasa may have served as a protector of the Kushan ruling family, and interpreted his absence from post-Kushan Bactrian materials as possibly reflecting this specific royal function. The inscription also provides evidence of how the divine names could be equated across religious vocabularies, a later interlinear addition has been read as identifying Soroushard (Soroush) and Narasa with the Indian Mahāsena and Viśākha, respectively, although the precise alignment of the gloss has been debated.

== In other religious traditions ==
=== The Vedas ===
The Avestan Nairiiō.saŋha has a close linguistic and ritual counterpart in Vedic Narāśaṃsa, a designation associated with the fire god Agni. The Indo-Iranian comparison has been noted both in studies of the name and in analyses of the sacrificial liturgies. Forms such as Vedic Nṛśaṃsa and Śaṃsa have also entered reconstructions of the older expression, usually interpreted as praise or utterance concerning men. Velizar Sadovski's comparison of the Vedic and Avestan liturgical lists gives the parallel a more precise setting. In the Avestan core list, Fire (Ātar) is followed by the sacrificial barəsman, Apam Napat and Neryosang. Its Vedic counterpart contains Agni, Tanūnapāt, Narāśaṃsa and the ritual grass (barhis), with the sequence of the last elements varying. The Vedic rites normally begin with five preliminary offerings, corresponding in number to the five objects invoked in Yasna 71.23: Fire, barəsman, Apam Napat, Neryosang and Dāmōiš Upamana. The same scholarship connects the Iranian figure with the cult of ancestors, drawing on Vidēvdād 19.32 and 19.34, in which the righteous dead reach the divine dwelling and Neryosang gathers with them.

=== Manichaeism ===
Manichaeans adopted several Iranian words for divinity, including Middle Persian bay and yazad and Parthian bag and yazad. Among the divine names adapted in Iranian Manichaean texts was Narisah Yazad, which could designate the figure known in Manichaean cosmology as the Third Messenger, or Third Ambassador. In Syriac the title is izgaddā ("messenger"), and in Latin tertius legatus. Iranian forms include Middle Persian nrēšyazad or nryshyzd, Parthian Narisaf Yazad (nrysfyzd) and hrdyg fryštg, and Sogdian nryšnx βγy, alongside a borrowed form nrʾy-sβ yzδ and the translated title ʾštykw prʾy-štʾk. The title and the deity's other names also have Coptic and Chinese counterparts. The Third Messenger belongs to the Manichaean group of solar and redeeming divinities. He is charged with freeing the Living Soul, the divine light trapped within the material cosmos, from its bonds and contributes to the rescue of human souls. In the mythic account, he appears in male and female forms to arouse the female and male archons, and his action sets the sun, moon and cosmic wheel in motion. Manichaean gods could change their visible forms for such purposes; the messenger's seduction of the archons is part of this cosmic process, not the same narrative as the story of the first women recorded by Theodore bar Konai.

The messenger's role is also set among other agents of Manichaean creation and salvation. The Friend of Lights, known in Syriac as ḥabīb nūhrā, Middle Persian as rwšnʾn xwʾryst, Parthian as fryhrwšn, and Sogdian as fryy rwšn βγyy, brings forth the Great Architect within a triad of largely world-forming deities, although the Friend's wider function is uncertain. The Great Architect (Syriac bn rbʾ, Middle Persian rʾz yʿ wzrg or rʾz yʿ g rwšn, Parthian bʾmyzd, Sogdian βʾm βγyy) works at the Third Messenger's command to build the New Paradise, which is the destination of redeemed souls and a prison for the powers of darkness. The Living Spirit, called the Father of Life in some Coptic sources (Syriac rūḥā ḥayyā, Middle Persian myhryzd, Parthian wʾd jywndg, Sogdian wʾd jywndg or wʾδ jywndyy), has another task, he frees the First Man from demonic captivity, makes the world from the bodies of defeated demons and confines the remainder within it. The different duties of these figures are important when their Iranian names overlap. The title "Third Messenger" also reflects a genuine three-part arrangement within Manichaean accounts, rather than merely a division made by modern scholars. Yet no corresponding gods are generally called First and Second Messenger, an exception occurs in Chinese terminology, where dier shi ("Second Messenger") is applied to the Friend of Lights. Manichaean religious practice addressed hymns and prayers to the Third Messenger and Jesus the Splendor, prominent figures of the Third Evocation. The suffering Living Soul was also an object of praise, especially because its release was the goal of the elect's ritual meal and the chanting of hymns was understood to help free its particles of light.

The identification of the Third Messenger with Iranian deities was not uniform. In Parthian and Sogdian terminology the figure could be named after Neryosang or after Mithra, who was associated there with the sun, the corresponding Sogdian solar name also appears as Miši. In Middle Persian writings, by contrast, Mithra generally designated the Living Spirit, the cosmic builder and rescuer of the First Man. The Parthian name Narisaf Yazad and the Sogdian form nryšnx βγy preserve the alternative association with the Zoroastrian messenger. Scholars have explained this divergence through the different religious settings in which the Iranian divine names were received. Walter Bruno Henning suggested that the Mithra known in third-century Persian Zoroastrianism differed enough from Parthian and Sogdian concepts for different Manichaean equations to arise. Mary Boyce placed emphasis on the strength of Mithra's solar character among Parthian Manichaeans, in her account it displaced Narisaf as the dominant Iranian image of the Third Messenger and brought Mithraic features into his worship. She linked this development with the missionaries' abandonment of an earlier equation between Mithra and the Living Spirit. Werner Sundermann likewise contrasted Mani's distinction between Mithra and the sun with the equation made by his Parthian missionary Ammō, who identified the Third Messenger with the solar Mithra. The Manichaean Neryosang could also be associated with the Semitic deity Ēl, a further identification discussed by Sundermann. In Sogdian Manichaean material, however, the name nr(y)šnx vγyy has also been reported for the Friend of Light.

=== Other accounts ===
A different story featuring a youthful Neryosang survives in the account of Theodore bar Konai. After Ohrmazd gives women to righteous men, the women turn to Satan, who makes them happy and offers to grant their wishes. Fearing that renewed intercourse with the righteous men would harm them, Ohrmazd creates Neryosang as an exceptionally attractive youth of fifteen and places him naked behind Satan. When the women see him, they desire him and ask Satan to give him to them. The account ends with their appeal to "Satan, our father, give us the god Neryosang as a gift." R. C. Zaehner suggested that Theodore brought this figure into the story from a comparable Manichaean myth, since Neryosang is absent from the corresponding episode in the Bundahishn. The use of Neryosang-related names beyond Zoroastrian literature has also been discussed in connection with Mithra and other messenger or solar figures. The pairing of the two divine names appears in the personal name Mithranerseh and in the name Ners-Mithra of a Christian monastery in Caucasian Albania. James R. Russell noted that Parthian Manichaean missionaries identified the Third Messenger with both Mithra and Neryosang, and pointed to the related comparison of solar and messenger functions in other regions. Among the Commagene parallels discussed by scholars is the pairing of Helios and Hermes, Armenian Tir has likewise been understood as combining messenger and solar traits. The frequent Armenian personal name Nersēs has been taken as a sign of an older familiarity with Neryosang, although an independent Armenian cult is not otherwise attested. One interpretation holds that Tir overshadowed him in Armenia, just as the worship of Soroush may have eclipsed his cult in Persian Zoroastrianism.

== See also ==
- Zoroastrianism in Armenia
- Shahnameh
- Manichaeism in China
