= Teimuraz (given name) =

- Gender: Male

Origin
- Origin: Persian
- Meaning: Strong-bodied
- Region of origin: Georgia and the Caucasus

Teimuraz (Georgian: თეიმურაზ, also spelled Teymuraz, Taimuraz or Taymuraz) is a Georgian male name which derives from the Persian Tahmuras, a figure in Iranian mythology who appears as the "third shah of the world" in Ferdowsi’s Shahnameh.

Notable people with the name include:

== Rulers, politicians and ambassadors ==
- Teimuraz Bagrationi
- Teimuraz of Imereti
- Teimuraz I
- Teimuraz II
- Taymuraz Mamsurov, head of Republic of North Ossetia–Alania, Russia
- Teimuraz Ramishvili, Russian diplomat

== Sportsmen ==
- Gagamaru Masaru, sumo wrestler from Georgia, born as Teimuraz Jugheli
- Teymuraz Gabashvili, Russian tennis player
- Teymuraz Gongadze, Georgian football player
- Teimuraz Kakulia, tennis player and Soviet/Georgian tennis coach
- Teimuraz Sharashenidze, Georgian football player
- Taimuraz Tigiyev, Kazakhstani wrestler
