= Menog-i Khrad =

Zoroastrian Middle Persian book circa 8th century

The Mēnōg-ī Xrad (Middle Persian pronunciation: [ˈmeːnoːgiː xrad], lit. 'Spirit of Wisdom') is one of the most important secondary texts in Zoroastrianism written in Middle Persian.

Also transcribed in Pazend as Mēnōy-i X(i/a)rad and in New Persian Mēnō-yi Xirad, the text is a Zoroastrian Pahlavi book in sixty-three chapters (a preamble and sixty-two questions and answers), in which a symbolic character called Dānāg (lit. 'knowing, wise') poses questions to the personified Spirit of Wisdom, who is extolled in the preamble and identified in two places (2.95, 57.4) with innate wisdom (āsn xrad). The book, like most Middle Persian books, is based on oral tradition and has no known author. According to the preamble, Dānāg, searching for truth, traveled to many countries, associated himself with many savants, and learned about various opinions and beliefs. When he discovered the virtue of xrad (1.51), the Spirit of Wisdom appeared to him to answer his questions.

The book belongs to the genre of andarz (lit. 'advice') literature, containing mostly practical wisdom on the benefits of drinking wine moderately and the harmful effects of overindulging in it (20, 33, 39, 50, 51, 54, 55, 59, 60), although advice on religious questions is by no means lacking. For example, there are passages on keeping quiet while eating (2.33-34); on not walking without wearing the sacred girdle (kuštī) and undershirt (sudra; 2.35-36); on not walking with only one shoe on (2.37-38); on not urinating in a standing position (2.39-40); on gāhānbār and hamāg-dēn ceremonies (4.5); on libation (zōhr) and the yasna ceremony (yazišn; 5.13); on not burying the dead (6.9); on marriage with next of kin (xwedodah) and trusteeship (stūrīh; 36); on belief in dualism (42); on praying three times a day and repentance before the sun, the moon, and fire (53); on belief in Ohrmazd as the creator and in the destructiveness of Ahriman and belief in *stōš (the fourth morning after death), resurrection, and the Final Body (tan-ī pasēn; 63). The first chapter, which is also the longest (110 pars.), deals in detail with the question of what happens to people after death and the separation of soul from body.

It is believed by some scholars that this text has been first written in Pazend and latter, using the Pazend text, it was rewritten in Middle Persian, but others believe that this text was originally written in Middle Persian and later written in Pazend, Sanskrit, Gujarati and New Persian. The oldest surviving manuscripts there are L19, found in the British Library, written in Pazend and Gujarati, which is believed to date back to 1520. One of the characteristics of L19 text is that the word Xrad "wisdom" is spelled as Xard throughout the text. The oldest surviving Pahlavi version of this text is K43 found in Royal Library, Denmark.

The Mēnōg-ī Xrad was first translated into English as West, Edward William (1885). Sacred Books of the East: Pahlavi texts, pt. 3. Clarendon Press..

== See also ==
- Danag-i Menog-i Khrad
- Middle Persian
- Middle Persian literature
- Zoroastrianism
