= Kush Nama =

Medieval Persian epic poem written by Hakim Iranshah ibn Abi al-Khayr

Kush-Nama (Persian: کوش‌نامه) is a Persian epic poem and part of a mythical history of Iran written by Ḥakim Iranshān (or Irānshāh) ibn Abu l-Khayr between the years 1108 and 1111 (501–04).

== Manuscript and background ==
A critical edition of the poem based on unique manuscript of the work is found in a collection held in the British Museum (OR 2780) and published in a critical edition by Professor Jalal Matini, and in an English translation by Kaveh L Hemmat.

The manuscript collection contains five epic poems: Asadi Tusi's Garshasp-nama, Ahmad Tabrizi's Shāhanshāh-nāma, Tārikh-e Changiz Khān va Jāneshinānash ("The History of Genghis Khan and his Successors"), the Bahman-nameh, and the Kush-nama. It originally also contained the Shahnameh, however, this portion was separated from the rest of the codex.

Much of the epic was likely based on one or more Middle Persian prose texts. This manuscript has 10,129 couplets and contains some scribal errors. The text can be divided into a preface, a frame story about a king named Kush (different from the main character), a second frame story about Alexander the Great, and the main narrative which tells the story of Kush the Tusked and his battles with Abtin and Fereydun and their adventures in China, Korea, the Maghreb, and the Iberian Peninsula.

The introduction (lines 1 – 226) begins by the customary tradition of extolling God. Subsequently, the author then references the Bahman-nama as his previous work. Then he gives the reasons behind their composition and ends with praise of the patron. The story deals with the eventful life of Kush the Tusked (or Persian: Pil-gush, "The Elephant-eared"), the son of Kush who is the brother of the king Zahhak. Kush the Tusked is said to have lived 1,500 years. The epic poem is dedicated to the Seljuk sultan Malik-Shah I (r. 1105–18). The writer's name does not appear in the work.

== Story ==
The work encompasses events that take place during the reigns of the mythical kings of Iran, the evil Zahhak and the heroic Faridun. In a section at the beginning, the story deals with the heroism, triumphs, deceit and philandering of the character Kush the Tusked. The claim of Kush the Tusked being divine is also recounted in the story. The tale starts with the dragon-fiend king Zahhak who was on the verge of slaying Jamshid. Zahhak predicts that a person from Jamshid's royal line shall avenge his death. In order to circumvent this prediction, Zahhak sends his brother Kush to Čin (parts of China and Central Asia in Persian mythology) to get rid of Jamshid's off-springs. These off-springs have in their possession, the chronicle called the Andarz-e Jamshid ("Jamshid's Testament"), a book that foretells events in the family's future and counsels them on what to do when they do. Based on the advice of this book, Jamshid's descendants remain hidden, roaming the forests and stay away from the reach of Kush. While looking for Jamshid's descendants, Kush stumbles upon the Pilguš (literally, the "elephant-eared") Tribe. He battles this tribe and takes a woman from the tribe as his bride. The woman bears him an elephant-eared and tusked son. But when Kush sees the hideous like face of his son, he flies into an angry range. He kills his wife for giving birth to such a demonic creature. Subsequently, he abandons his son in the forest that was the hiding place of the house of Jamshid.

During this time, Abtin (pronounced as Ābtin), the third generation of Jamshid's line (Jamšid > Nunak > Mahāru > Ābtin) appears in the story. Abtin's wife provides shelter to the tusked and elephant-eared son of Kush and he is raised in Abtin's family. The child shows extraordinary examples of physical fighting and he fights for a while against his father Kush in Abtin's army. However, once Kush and his son recognize each other, they join forces against Abtin. Abin's clan who is now under attack from both Kush and his son consults the chronicle of Jamshid. The chronicle advises that whenever he finds himself in trouble, he should seek refuge with the king of Māchin (inner China in Persian literature). Māchin itself has two section: one which borders Čin and is ruled by a king named Bahak; the other is an island which is in a month's journey and is ruled by the King Teyhur.

Abtin is warmly received by Teyhur and he stays in the island which is referenced as Basilā, Kuh and Jazira in the book. Abtin also marries the daughter of Teyhur who is named daughter Farārang. During his stay in the island, Abtin is inspired by a dream which tells him to go to Iran. This episode illustrates the overall recurring importance of dreams in the epic. With Teyhur's approval, Abtin and Farārang aided by an ancient mariner sail for fourteen months and reach the sea of Gilan and Amol (probably meant the Caspian Sea). In Iran, Farārang gives birth to the Iranian hero Fereydun. When the child reaches the age of four, his father, inspired by a dream, entrusts Faridun to a person by the name of salkat, the commander of a fortress in Damavand which Zahhak has not been able to capture. Agents of Zahhak then capture Abtin and put him to death. When, Kush the Tusked learns of Abtin's refuge on the island of Jazira, his marriage to Farārang, and his return to Iran, he sets up plans to take over the island. Despite the fact that island ruled by Teyhur has not been conquered for 3000 years, he craftily takes it over. Afterwards, he actually destroys the whole island. At this time, news of Zahhak's capture at the hand of Faridun reaches Kush and Kush returns to Čin. Fereydun, shackles Zahhak's hand and foot, and puts a yoke around his neck, imprisoning him the mount Damavand. After vanquishing Zahhak, Fereydun decides to put an end to Kush the Tusked' tyranny in Chin. Fereydun sends an army to Chin to defeat Kush and capture him, but the army is rerouted. Meanwhile, Kush builds a city by the name of Kushan in the lands beyond the Oxus. Kush decrees that a statue of himself be erected in the city, and he forces the inhabitants to worship it. Fereydun, eventually sends Kāran/Qāran (cf. with the Parthian house of Karen) to the land of Chin with a vast army. Fereydun's army is victorious and Qāran captures Kush in hand-to-hand combat. Kush is sent back to Iran, and he is imprisoned beside Zahhak, in Damavand. Kush is imprisoned for forty years until Armies from Abyssinia and Nubia (called Mazandaran by the author and should not be confused with the province of Mazandaran in Iran) attack north Africa and advance as Egypt. At this time, the inhabitants of the area seek the help of Fereydun. Fereydun sends his Iranian troops there, to defeat the armies from the south. But once those troops leave, the armies from south return and attack the inhabitants of North Africa and Egypt.

In a meeting of Faridun with his advisors, they came to a consensus that they must send a harsh tyrant to the West. The unanimous choice is Kush, who is unshackled and brought before Faridun. Kush seeks forgiveness from Fereydun, and swears to be a loyal servant of the King of Iran. A proclamation to which the gentry bears witness is written, so that the pact may be honored. Kush is then sent as the head of the army to Egypt and North Africa. He defeats the enemy and the spoils are sent back to Faridun. Kush also founds several new cities in the region. However, Kush breaks his pledge to Faridun and openly rebels against him. He kills the Iranian members of his army, and orders each home to have an effigy of him and that it be worshipped daily. In order to subdue Kush, Faridun sends his son Salm to vanquish Kush. Salm defeats Kush's army, but Kush flees to the West. During this time, the three sons of Faridun, Tur, Iraj and Salm were openly fighting. Iraj demands tribute from his two other brothers, and they on the other hand align with Kush. Together, the brothers kill Iraj and they divide the world with Kush, and take some territory from Faridun. However, Manuchehr the son of Iraj seeks vengeance for his father and with a large army goes to battle against Tur, Salm and Kush. Manuchehr with a large army goes into battle against the two sons and Kuš. Tur and Salm are killed in battle, and Manuchehr wounds Kush with his bull-headed mace. The wounded Kush was able to escape to Khwāvarān (the East), and gain control of the region. Kush became very powerful again and had collected a formidable army. He rules these lands for a long time. During this era of the story, the armies from Abyssinia and Nubia attack once again. Kush goes to battle against these armies but he has no success. During this era, Kaykavus now is the king of Iran. Kush convinces the Iranian ruler to go to war, however the combined forces of Kush and the Iranian armies is not enough to defeat the armies of Abyssinia and Nubia. However, the great legendary hero Rostam is sent to the area and defeats the armies of Abyssinia and Nubia. This part of the epic is very close to Ferdowsi's version of Rustam's mission to Mazandaran (Abyssinia and Nubia).

Despite several setbacks, Kush remains determined on his religious aspirations and his proclamation of divinity. During a hunting expedition, he becomes separated from his crew and loses his way. On the way, he stops at a house. The wise lord of the palace, who is a pious man, invites him and asks him, what is his name. Kush replies that: "I am God, the Giver of Daily Bread and Guide"!. The owner finds the idea laughable and Kush eventually abandons his claim to divinity. In return, the owner, who was also an expert physician performs surgery on his so that the face of Kush is restored to human form. The owner wins Kush over to the cause of God, and Kush spents 46 years with learning a variety of disciplines. The wise lord then convinces Kush to return to his homeland. Kush returns to his homeland and encourages everyone to worship God. The story ends by the fact that the wise lord was a descendant of Jamshid, and he was giving the story of Kuš-e Pil-Dandān to Alexander.

== See also ==
- Bahman-nameh
- Ferdowsi
- Faramarz-nama
- Persian literature
- Shahnameh
