= Iranshah (poet) =

Persian poet (11th-12 centuries AD)

Hakim Iranshah ibn Abi al-Khayr (Persian: حکیم ایرانشاه بن ابی‌الخیر), commonly known as Iranshah or Iranshan (ایرانشان), was a Persian poet who lived in the Seljuk Empire in the 11th and 12th centuries.

Iranshah is the author of two epic poems, Kush-nama and Bahman-nama, both written in the same style as the Shahnama of Ferdowsi (died 1019/25). Although no mention of its author is made in either of the works, the Mujmal al-tavarikh va al-qisas (written in 1126) credits Iranshah with its composition. Iranshah most likely wrote the Bahman-nama between 1092 and 1108, as indicated by mentions of historical events, and reverence of the sultans Mahmud I (r. 1092–1094) and Muhammad I Tapar (r. 1105–1118). Set in the mythological Iranian world, the work narrates the adventures of Kay Bahman, the son of Isfandiyar. Iranshah states that the Bahman-nama was inspired by the ceaseless battles and wars of his patron, Muhammad I Tapar, which reminded him of the ceaseless battles between Bahman and Rostam's family. This implies that the work was also written to serve as advice for solving the socio-political issues of the time.

The Kush-nama was written between 1108 and 1111, and is referred to as Qessa-ye Kush-e Pil-Dandan ("the tale of Kush the Tusked") and Akhbar-e Kush-e Pil-Dandan ("accounts of Kush the Tusked") in the Mujmal al-tavarikh. Also mythological in nature, it tells the story of Kush the Tusked (or Pil-gush, "The Elephant-eared"), the son of Kush (brother of the evil king Zahhak).

The modern Iranian historian Jalal Matini ranks Iranshah as the third best writer of epic poetry among his contemporaries, behind Ferdowsi's Shahnama and Asadi Tusi's Garshasp-nama.

The correct spelling of Iranshah's name is uncertain. He is called "Iranshan" in two out of four books of the Mujmal al-tavarikh, while in the other two he is called "Iranshah" and "Inshah." Modern historians refer to him as either Iranshah or Iranshan. Although he was a Muslim, it is not known if he was Sunni or Shi'i.

== Sources ==
- Askari, Nasrin (2016). The medieval reception of the Shāhnāma as a mirror for princes. Brill. ISBN 978-90-04-30790-2.
- Hanaway, W. L. (1988). "Bahman-nāma". In Yarshater, Ehsan (ed.). Encyclopædia Iranica. Vol. III/5: Bahai Faith III–Baḵtīārī tribe II. London and New York: Routledge & Kegan Paul. pp. 499–500. ISBN 978-0-71009-117-8.
- Matini, Jalal (2008). "Kuš-nāma". Encyclopædia Iranica, online edition. New York.
