= Shahrasb (Shahnameh) =

Mythical character

Shahrasb (Persian: شهراسب), also known as Shahrasp, is one of the mythical characters in Shahnameh who was a pious and reliable advisor for Tahmuras. According to Shahnameh, Shahrasp benevolently taught king Tahmuras the right (moral) way to handle the problems. As the king followed Shahrasb's guidance, became cleansed of any sin and found Khvarenah.

== Appearance in the Movies ==
=== The Legend of Mardoush ===
In the animated Persian trilogy The Legend of Mardoush, Shahrasb is an old, wise, and well-known priest among the Katouzians living in a temple in the Alborz mountains. In the first episode, the new king Jamshid consults Shahrasb for strange problems emerging in his kingdom. Shahrasb reveals that Ahriman was the cause of those problems and suggests Jamshid to capture the cup of divination, currently possessed by Ahriman, so that Ahriman cannot use it (i.e. observe the world through the cup) anymore. In the third episode, Faranak (Fereydun's mother) brings the young boy Fereydun to the temple and asks Shahrasb to take care of Fereydun and teach him, without revealing his identity. Later, Shahrasb is summoned to Zahhak's palace to answer how Zahhak can prevent his doom. He is then imprisoned since he publicly told Zahhak that he cannot escape his destiny.

=== The Last Fiction ===
In the long animated movie The Last Fiction, the character of Shahrasb is introduced as the old and wise man of Alborz temple, and the moral/spiritual master of Afaridoon.
