= Kiyanush =

Character in the Shahnameh

Shahnameh Men
- Name: Kiyanush
- Dependency: Brother
- Mother name: Faranak

Other Information
- killed: Fereydun
- Well known: Envy

Kiyanush (Persian: کیانوش) is the name of one of the mythological characters of Iran in Ferdowsi Shahnameh. He was the son of Abtin and Faranak, and one of the two brothers of Fereidun who helped him win Zahhak.

== Kiyanush in the Shahnameh ==
Kiyanush and Barmayeh, in the midst of the battle of Fereydun with Zahhak, saw Fereydun reign over the world inevitable, and their envy set the scene for the night of Fereydun murder and the scene of the murder. But their plan did not work.

Fereydun had not yet completely won over Zahhak, but repeated Fereydun conquests had convinced everyone that he would soon win the war. He had now besieged the capital of Zahhak and had entered the temple of Zahhak. And all the members of the temple honored and respected him, and welcomed Fereydun. After the night's reception, Fereydun needed to sleep and spent the rest of the night sleeping. His popularity and triumphs envied the two brothers, who plotted to kill him overnight. The sleeping-room was apparently on the side of a mountain that could be destroyed by the landing of a large rock. Kiyanush and Barmayeh used the darkness of night to climb the summit out of sight of the army to roll a huge rock. The sound of landing woke Fereydun stone. According to the Shahnameh, Fereydun held the stone by the power of God and said no.

== Sources ==
- Ferdowsi Shahnameh. From the Moscow version. Mohammed Publishing. ISBN 964-5566-35-5
