= The Legend of Mardoush =

- VCD cover
- Genre: Epic, Clay animation
- Based on: Shahnameh
- Written by: Fereydun Daneshmand
- Directed by: Hossein MoradiZadeh
- Music by: Behzad Abdi
- Country of origin: Iran
- Original language: Persian
- No. of episodes: 3 near 100-minute films

Production
- Producer: Saba Animation Center

Original release
- Network: IRIB TV1

The Legend of Mardoush (Persian: افسانه ماردوش), is a long animated Persian trilogy based on the mythical stories of Shahnameh. The metaphor mardoush, literally meaning snake-shoulder, refers to Zahhak, as two snakes grew on his shoulders after they were kissed by Ahriman. The production of this movie started in 2002 and finished in 2005 and it is one of the longest clay animation projects done in Iran.

== Episodes ==
=== Cup of Divination ===
The first episode starts with a short review of history from the beginning, up to when Jamshid becomes the king. As he sees strange problems are emerging in his kingdom, he consults Shahrasb, an old, wise, and well-known priest among the Katouzians living in the Alborz mountains. Shahrasb reveals that Ahriman was the cause of those problems and suggests him to capture the cup of divination, currently possessed by Ahriman, so that Ahriman cannot use it anymore. The episode is mainly about Jamshid and his 6 fellows looking for the cup. The episode ends when Jamshid successfully returns with the cup and founds Nowruz.

=== Azhi Dehak ===
In the second episode, Jamshid, little by little, becomes merciless and proud of himself. Against the warning of his friends, he frees the deevs imprisoned by his father in Alborz mountains to use their force in building castles. Concurrently, the movie shows how Zahhak kills his father and becomes the "mardoush". The two characters finally confront, Jamshid loses the battle and escapes. Zahhak captures the whole Iran, and kills many people. The episode ends when he dreams Fereydun as the person who is going to take him down. Finding the meaning of his dream, he orders to kill all newborn boys.

=== The Fight of Fereydun ===
The third episode starts with the birth of Fereydun. He is secretly brought up in a grove, until Zahhak finds out his location but fails to catch him. Faranak (Fereydun's mother) then brings the young boy to Alborz mountains and asks Shahrasb to take care of Fereydun and teach him. Fereydun finally becomes a strong and clever man. With a huge army, he joins Kaveh and revolts against Zahhak, defeats and arrests him in the Alborz Mountains.
