= Kianoush =

Kianoush, also spelled Kiyanush or Kianoosh (Persian: کیانوش), is a masculine name derived from Old Persian. It translates to “brave” or “courageous".

== People ==
- Kianoush Ayari (born 1951), Iranian film director and screenwriter
- Kianoush Rahmati (born 1978), Iranian footballer and manager
- Kianoush Rostami (born 1991), Iranian-Kosovar weightlifter
- Kianush Sanjari (1982-2024), Iranian journalist, activist and prisoner

== Characters ==
- Kiyanush, character in the Shahnameh
