= Hamoun's Night =

Independent Iranian film (2021)

- Directed by: Hamideh Moeinfar
- Screenplay by: Somayeh Tajik
- Produced by: Hamideh Moeinfar; Ali Ladoni
- Starring: Nazanin Farahani; Reza Yazdani
- Cinematography: Behrouz Seifi
- Edited by: Saman Fani
- Distributed by: Honar Aval
- Release date: 2021
- Running time: 73 minutes
- Country: Iran
- Language: Persian
- Budget: $17000

Hamoun's Night (Persian: شب_هامون) is a 2021 Iranian psychological thriller and an independent and low-budget film directed by Hamideh Moeinfar, starring Nazanin Farahani and Reza Yazdani. The screenplay was written by Somayeh Tajik. The film was released by the Honar Aval Company.

In 2022, Hamoun's Night won the prize for best Non-European dramatic feature from ECU 2022, the European Independent Film Festival in Paris.

== Plot ==
Aida, a young woman living in poor conditions and working in a tailor shop, tries to save her sick baby. Her poverty came from an investment company that lost her money. Her baby then dies. Aida approaches the man who caused her financial crisis in the guise of a romantic date with the intention of revenge.

== Cast ==
- Nazanin Farahani as Aida
- Reza Yazdani as The Man

== Reception ==
Hamoun's Night is a chamber film and offered a new experience in Iranian contemporary cinema as a local depiction of the psychological thriller genre. "The film is the directorial debut of Hamideh Moeinfar, who tried to portray a local narrative of a psychological thriller, which is not only limited to genre components to create fear and terror, but also observes social issues and challenges of today's society". "Considering the boldness of the director for making such a film, we see a relatively new film in form".
