= Defenders of Oasis =

1992 video game

- North American cover art
- Developer: Sega
- Publisher: Sega
- Platform: Game Gear
- Release: JP: September 18, 1992; NA: December 1992; EU: 1992
- Genre: Role-playing
- Mode: Single-player

Defenders of Oasis (Note: Known in Japan as Shadam Crusader: The Far Kingdom (Japanese: シャダム・クルセイダー 遥かなる王国, Hepburn: Shadamu Kuruseida: Harukanaru Ōkoku)) is a role-playing video game developed and published by Sega for the Game Gear in 1992. The game's setting is based on One Thousand and One Nights, and the plot centers on a heroic prince and his companions, who set out to confront an empire attempting to revive the dark god Ahriman. The game was one of the few original RPGs made for the Game Gear, and features an overhead gameplay perspective, a command-based combat system, and an autosave feature. Defenders of Oasis was commercially successful and positively received by reviewers, who praised the game's visuals and level of detail.

== Gameplay ==
An example of combat in Defenders of Oasis

Defenders of Oasis is a role-playing game in which the player controls the Prince of Shadam, who must defeat the empire that has attacked his kingdom. The Prince is initially solitary, but forms a party including three other characters over the course of the game. The game is played from an overhead perspective, and the setting includes several villages and castles, in which the Prince is capable of conversing with pedestrians and collecting objects. Each village includes at least one shop where the player can purchase and sell items that can aid the Prince and his party, such as weapons, armor, and accessories. Villages also include a certain place where the party can rest and recover their hit points and spell points.

At random intervals in areas outside of a village and at specific moments in the story, the game will enter the combat screen. This screen displays the names of the party's current members and their amounts of remaining hit points at the top of the screen, the enemies currently attacking the player (with a maximum of three enemies appearing at a time) in the center of the screen, and a textual interface through which the player inputs commands for the characters at the bottom of the screen. During these encounters, the player characters and the enemies exchange moves until one side is defeated. As the player characters take damage from enemy attacks, their number of hit points decreases. If a character's hit points are fully depleted, the character will be knocked out and unable to fight unless another character uses an item or spell to revive them; characters who are knocked out will also revive with a small number of hit points if the battle is won. When all enemies on the screen have been defeated, the player characters are rewarded with an amount of experience points, money, and in some cases, items.

The player can access a status screen, where the characters' status can be checked, and items and spells can be used and equipped. Ongoing game progress is stored via the autosave function.

== Plot ==
In ancient times, the hero Jamshid sealed away the dark god Ahriman and established the kingdom of Shadam. Although Shadam was once conquered by Ahriman's servant Zahhak, it was reclaimed one thousand years later by the hero Fereydun, and Shadam finds peace and prosperity under successive kings. However, Ahriman begins to plot his return; he manipulates the Yufurat Empire, led by Zahhak's descendant, into searching for the three holy rings that Jamshid used to seal him away. In the present day, King Shadam VII tasks his son, the Prince, with escorting Mariam, the Princess of the neighboring kingdom Mahamoud and keeper of one of the rings. When the Yufurat Empire attacks the Shadam Kingdom, the King gives the Prince the second ring and instructs him and Mariam to escape to Mahamoud and seek aid from its king. The Prince is attacked by the traitorous General Gaddafi and awakens in the lair of a resistance group. The group's leader informs the Prince of a magic lamp hidden within the kingdom's treasury, and suggests that the lamp's power can nullify Gaddafi's magic sword. The Prince obtains the treasury key from his dying tutor and discovers the lamp, which houses a powerful Jinn who declares the Prince to be his new master. Aided by the Jinn's magic, the Prince successfully defeats Gaddafi and avenges his tutor. The Prince and Mariam disembark on a ship helmed by a captain and his son Sindbad.

While replenishing supplies at an island village, the group is ambushed by Al Karria, an elite Yufurat royal guard. Al murders Sindbad's father, kidnaps Mariam, and strands the Prince and Sindbad on the island. Within the island's temple, the Jinn learns a spell that allows the group to teleport to Mahamoud. The Prince informs King Mahamoud of Mariam's capture and meets the magician Kala Han, who suspects that Mariam is being held in the Yufurat Empire's capital Gylan. The Prince obtains a Gylan passport from a Yufurat deserter and infiltrates Al Karria's castle, but falls into a trap and is imprisoned in Al's dungeon. The Prince escapes execution with the help of a thief named Agmar and releases Mariam, who discloses the Emperor's goal to obtain the holy rings, her ring having been taken. The group returns to Mahamoud, where Kala Han reveals that the third ring is hidden in a tomb near the village of Uruk. Mariam, grateful for her rescue, gives the Prince an amulet capable of putting the dead to rest. At Uruk, the group retrieves a hammer that can open the tomb from the hideout of Ali Baba and his bandits, who have been terrorizing the village. Upon retrieving the third ring, the Prince is contacted by Jamshid's spirit, who warns the Prince of Ahriman's plot to escape his imprisonment by destroying the rings. Outside the tomb, the Prince is tricked by Al, disguised as Mariam, into relinquishing the lamp. The resistance group finds the Prince in Uruk and recruits him into an operation to liberate Shadam. The Prince infiltrates the castle and confronts Al, who appears to hold King Shadam hostage for the other two rings. After taking the rings, Al reveals the King to be a zombie reanimated to serve Yufurat. After being forced into battle with the King and the Jinn, the Prince uses Mariam's amulet to put his father's spirit to rest.

The group returns to Gylan and defeats Al before witnessing the Emperor destroying the rings in a ceremony. As Ahriman returns to the mortal realm and kills the Emperor, the group flees to Mahamoud. The Queen recalls a prophecy by Jamshid foretelling the appearance of the Tower of Ziggurat, which would tie the physical and spiritual realms together upon Ahriman's return. Kala Han also informs the group that inserting the rings' ashes into the lamp will restore their original power. At the top of the Tower, the group encounters the Roc, who can fly between worlds. The group ventures to the spiritual world and faces Ahriman in a final battle. They weaken him into a state where he can be locked away once more with the rings, which have been restored by the group's hope and resolve. After returning to the mortal world, the Prince ascends to the throne and weds Mariam, Sindbad becomes the captain of his father's ship, and Agmar ends up in prison again.

== Development and release ==
Defenders of Oasis was released for the Game Gear in Japan on September 18, 1992. The Western box art was illustrated by Julie Bell. The game was re-released on the Nintendo 3DS Virtual Console on July 18, 2012.

== Reception ==
Reception

Review scores
Publication	Score
GamePro	15.5/20
Sega Force	90%

Defenders of Oasis was met with a positive critical reception upon release. Paul Wooding and Adrian Pitt of Sega Force applauded the game: Wooding commended the variety of items and characters and the "highly original and entertaining" plot; Pitt proclaimed the game to be "instantly playable" and "the most user-friendly RPG I've ever played", and praised the visuals as "well defined and colourful" and the dynamic Oriental soundtrack as "some of the best I've heard spout outta the Game Gear". Joe Hutsko of GamePro was surprised by the game's amount of detail in relation to its four-megabyte size, and praised the graphics as "finely detailed, superbly drawn, and practically as good as those found on the Genesis", but noted that the combat eventually became tedious due to the static visuals, and dismissed the music as a "repetitive fantasy flute, common to FRPGs".

In its debut month, Defenders of Oasis was the seventh highest-selling Game Gear title at Babbage's, and stayed within the top-ten chart on four subsequent months.

Damien McFerran of Time Extension included the game in his list of the best games in the Game Gear's library, determining it to be the console's best RPG in a library that had few titles in the genre. He complimented its mix of exploration, turn-based combat, and a storyline based on One Thousand and One Nights.
