= The Last Fiction =

- film poster
- Persian: آخرین داستان
- Directed by: Ashkan Rahgozar
- Written by: Ashkan Rahgozar
- Based on: Shahnameh
- Produced by: Ehsan Rasoulof
- Starring: Parviz Parastoui; Leila Hatami; Hamed Behdad; Baran Kosari; Ashkan Khatibi
- Edited by: Zhinus Pedram
- Music by: Christophe Rezai
- Production company: Hoorakhsh Studios
- Distributed by: Namayesh Gostaran
- Release date: June 12, 2018 (Annecy)
- Running time: 100 minutes
- Country: Iran
- Language: Persian

The Last Fiction (Persian: آخرین داستان, romanized: Akharín Dāstān) is an independent Iranian animated film adaptation of the story of "Zahhak", a page from the historical identity of Iranians and one of the central tales of Shahnameh by Ferdowsi. Ashkan Rahgozar is the director of The Last Fiction. The main idea of the recounting of this tale is to lend a different perspective to the legends and heroes of ancient Iranians. Production started in 2010, and since then over 100 animators have worked on the film.

The Last Fiction became the first representative of Iranian animated cinema along with 344 eligible films in the competition section of the best film of the 92nd Academy Awards.

Shahram Nazeri has performed the music for the final credits of the film.

== Summary ==
At a time when the shadow of Ahriman fell over the lands, King Jamshid, together with an army of his allies and with the Divine Virtue to accompany him, faced the army of Ahriman. With the will of Yazdan, Jamshid beat the Ahriman's army. He sits on the throne and proud of his conquest he acclaims that his victory is that of God. He calls on his allies to conquer the lands of the Ahriman and to hunt them down. However, Yazdan forsakes him and thus takes away his glory. Alone, Jamshid falls prey to greed and an insatiable madness. He leaves his daughter Shahrzad and bids the Council of Ministers that Mardas, the ally of the southern lands, sit on his throne in his absence. The following day, Jamshid, together with an army of his finest soldiers, sets out for the northern lands to hunt down Ahriman. He never returns. Mardas dies and according to the command of the council, Madras's only son, Zahhak, is to take over Jamshid's throne on behalf of his father. Alas, Zahhak’s very presence is pregnant with darkness. This darkness falls over the city and Jamkard is thrust into gloom and terror. Yet, once more with the passage of time an infant is born to a family of farmers in the heart of Jamkard who is named Fereydun...

== Voice cast ==
- Parviz Parastui as Tahmuras and Arshia,
- Leila Hatami as Shahrzad,
- Hasan Pourshirazi as Jamshid and Mardas,
- Hamed Behdad as Zahhak,
- Ashkan Khatibi as Fereydun,
- Baran Kosari as Mandana,
- Bita Farrahi as Ahriman,
- Shaghayegh Farahani as Faranak,
- Melika Sharifinia as Ermile and Garmail's Mother,
- Zoheir Yari as Abtin,
- Akbar Zanjanpour as Kāve,
- Farrokh Nemati as Shahrasb,
- Banipal Shoomoon as Rouzbeh,
- Majid Mozaffari as Baraman,

== Awards and nominations ==
In the course of the making of the film, in 2013, the work was able to win recognition and be presented as one of the six best ongoing projects at the Annecy Festival in France. Also, in 2016, this film was acclaimed as one of the four best animated films undergoing production in the world and was invited by Annecy and Cannes to the event of Marché du film.

The Last Fiction has been accepted by the 2018 Annecy International Animated Film Festival and will be screened at non-competition section for feature films.

The Last Fiction also competed at the 92nd Academy Awards in both Best Animated Feature and Best Picture categories.

- Winner of the Cocomix Music Award from Bucheon International Animation Festival
- Winner of Best Animated Movie from International Animation Festival AJAYU – Peru, 2019
- Winner of Best Animated Movie, Epic ACG fest, 2019
- Nominated for Best Animated Feature from Palm Springs Intl. Animation Festival & Expo, 2019
- Nominated for Best Animated Feature from International Fantastic Film Festival of Catalonia (Sitges Film Festival), 2018
- Crystal Simorgh for Best Animated Feature from 37th Fajr Film Festival, 2019
- Winner of Best Director, Best Screen Play and Special Jury Awards, from International Film Festival for Children and Youth, Isfahan, 2018
- Winner of Best Animation Movie from Southern Cone International Film Festival, 2019
- Best Animation Feature Film from GIRAF International Festival of Independent Animation, 2018
- Best Animated Feature and Best International Animated Feature from Tehran Animation Festival, 2018
- Asia Pacific Screen Awards, 2018
- Animasyros International Animation Festival + Agora, 2018
- CineMagic Belfast Festival, 2018
- SPARK Animation Festival, 2018
- St. Louis International Film Festival – SLIFF, 2018
- ReAnimania International Animation Film & Comics Art Festival of Yerevan, 2018
- Anchorage International Film Festival, 2018
- Kinofilm International Short Film Festival, 2018
- European Film Awards, 2018 – Official Selection
- VOID animation festival, 2018
- Animaze Montreal International Film Festival, 2018
- New Media Film Festival, 2019
- The INCA Imperial International Film Festival, 2019
- Medellín International Film Festival, 2019
- Sharm El-Sheikh Asian Film Festival (SAFF), 2019
- The Seoul Guro International Kids Film Festival (GUKIFF)
- Córdoba International Animation Festival – ANIMA – ANIMA, 2019
- San Diego International Kids Film Festival, 2019
- The Monterey International Film Festival, 2018
- The Animest International Animation Film Festival, 2019

== Music ==
In The Last Fiction we have combined different regional music of Iran (Iranian folk music) and modified it to be able to perform it in Orchestra. Iranian folk music is one of the old, influential and cultural music styles in the Middle East. It's transmitted through generations among the people of Iran. We have tried to use notes from different regions of Iran. From West of Iran (Kurdish/Uramani /Lori) to the east (Khorasani /Dutar); from North (Mazandaran) to South (Qeshm). Some of the performers played their regional instruments in Dohol Studio in Iran and the Orchestra was performed in F.A.M.E's project in Macedonia under supervision of Mr. Rezai. The main instrument of these soundtracks is Dutar, one of the historical instruments of Iran, and it was, originally, played by Bakshy-tribe. Bakshy-people are nomads, who've been traveling, singing and telling stories while playing Dutar throughout Iran, for centuries. In “The Last Fiction,” one of the main characters of the movie, Shahrzad, plays this historical instrument during her narration.

== The Graphic Novels ==
=== Jamshid ===
Beginning with two double volume series Jamshid: Dawn and Jamshid: Fall, the tale and mythos of The Book of Kings is told through the story of the greatest kings of Persia and serves as the prologue and introduction into the ancient world of Iran and Ferdowsi's epic masterpiece Shahnameh.Many of the tales in The Book of Kings are epic morality tales of Gods and Heroes not unlike classic Greek mythology, Norse Mythology, Shinto, Celtic mythology, and even The Bible and, serves as the basis of cultural identity and a showcase for the historical literature of ancient Iran.The epic masterpiece itself is a treasure trove of drama and conflict consisting of sixty thousand verses, and paints an exquisitely rich tapestry of Gods and Heroes and Villains and Devils that, ultimately are deeply universal stories which continue to resonate even today, a thousand years later. These tales and characters can be compared to characters and stories in modern entertainment such as Game of Thrones, Lord of the Rings, and even Star Wars.

Jamshid's journey as king was filled with victory, sacrifice, avarice, vainglory, and selfishness which was ultimately his downfall and was killed by the upstart, insidious Zahak. The graphic novels begin with Jamshid's tale and the feature animated film The Last Fiction begins as Zahak is replacing him on the throne and taking over the kingdom of Jamkard.

Hoorakhsh Studios chose Jamshid's tale to depict in graphic novel form as it is rich in story and serves as the foundation and origin story for the film The Last Fiction and for the entire Shahnameh itself. The first edition Jamshid: Dawn was published in 2016 and is a free interpretation of his origin story in The Book of Kings, and the second volume Jamshid: Fall, depicts the time of his decadence and down fall which will be published in 2017, just ahead of the release of the film. Fourteen volumes depicting the epic battles, kingdoms won and lost, loves & alliances, and good versus evil that is all incorporated in The Book of Kings is planned by Hoorakhsh Studios. The studio plan to create a franchise around the stories and characters from The Book of Kings to share with the world.

The graphic novels has been translated into English and published by Markosia and are available online now.

=== Arshia ===
Arshia is the story of Jamshid's Vozier and it is from the series of The Last Fiction Graphic novels. The two volumes of Arshia will soon be translated and published in English.

== Mobile Game ==
The Last Fiction mobile game, ‘The Divine Light’, directed by Babak Arjmand, and produced by Ehsan and Arman Rahgozar, a Hack and Slash game, has been published. Ashkan Rahgozar, the director of ‘The Last Fiction’, is the executive producer of ‘The Divine Light’. The game could be installed on Android and iOS platforms.
