= Reza Yazdani (singer) =

Iranian singer (born 1973)

Reza Yazdani رضا یزدانی
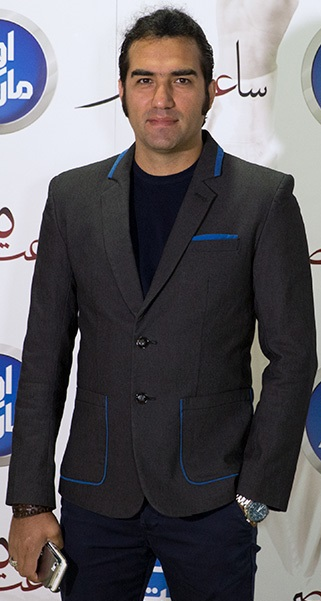
- Tearing while performing live
- Born: September 15, 1973 (age 53); Tehran, Iran
- Occupations: Singer; Composer; Actor
- Musical career
- Genres: Persian Pop; Rock
- Instruments: Vocals; Guitar
- Years active: 1998–present
- Labels: Reza Yazdani and Ali Oji Studio
- Website: rezayazdani.ir

Reza Yazdani (Persian: رضا یزدانی; born September 15, 1973 in Tehran) is an Iranian singer, musician, composer, and actor. He is an Iranian pop-rock musician and has released twelve official albums and numerous singles. His main instrument is guitar, especially electric guitar. He has performed live concerts since the release of his third album, Hiss, mainly in Milad Tower Concert Hall. His first album is called Shahre Del in which all the lyrics were from Rumi poems.

== Career ==
He started his career in songwriting and singing when he was 25 years old in 1998. his early works were primarily performed in plays. he released his first album "The City of Heart" in 2000 which included songs adapted from the poetry of Rumi.عکسهای رضا یزدانی و همسرش به همراه اش بیوگرافی his second album, Bird no Bird, was the result of a collaboration with Yaghma Golrooei. Yazdani has also the experience in composing songs for Iranian films.

- The Rambunctious court / play, singer & composer (1998)
- If the rain wishes... / play / singer & composer (1999)
- The City of Heart / album / released (2000)
- Bird No Bird / album / released (2003)
- The Verdict / movie / directed by Masoud Kumiaei / composer / singer / actor (2004)
- Winner of Hafez award / in the World of Image annual movie celebration for performing "Lalezar" in -the movie Verdict by: M. Kimiaei (2005)
- Hush... / album released in (2006)
- Elected singer in Persian Weblog Celebration for performing the song "The Tower" (2006)
- The Boss / movie / directed by: Masoud Kimiaei / composer / singer and actor (2007)
- Face to Face / movier / directed by: Ali zhekan / composer / singer and actor (2007)
- Living death of a dream / TV series / directed by: Fereidoun Jeirani / singer (2008)
- Say Tehran music video by: Ramin Heydarifaroughi / singer (2009)
- Blue / Esteghlal FC fan singer & composer (2010)
- Winner of Hafez award for second time in the world of image annual movies celebration for performing -Living death of a dream song in that TV series (2010)
- Trial on street / movie directed by: Masoud Kimiaei / singer (2011)
- The Recall / Series directed by: Hojat Ghasemzadeh Asl / singer (2011)
- Suspended steps / movie / directed by: Shahram Shahhoseini / singer (2011)
- Tehran Tehran / movie / actor of leading role directors: Dariush Mehrjooei & Mehdi Karampour (2012)
- Gandom Fragrance / movie / actor of leading role & singer directed by Mohamnadreza Khaki (2012)
- Retribution / movie / directed by: Hassan Fathi / singer (2012)
- Frozen Heart / TV series / singer (2012)
- 25 pm / album / released in 2012
- Winner of Hafez Award for third time in the world of image annual movies celebration for performing Tehran Tehran song (2013)
- Chera yadam nemiad "Maziar Sarmeh Remix" 2012
- Oblivion Time / album / released in 2013
- A bit Higher / play / singer and composer
- Made in Iran / TV series / directed by: Mohammad Hossein Latifi / singer (2014)
- Vague Memories / album (2014)
- Self-destruction / movie / directed by: Ahmad Kavari (2015)
- Recollection / TV series / directed by: Hodjat Ghasemzadeasl / produced for ifilm channel / singer(2015)
- Metrople / movie / directed by: Masoud Kimiaei / singer (2015)
- Exclusuvie line / movie / directed by: Mostafa Kiaei / singer ( 2015)
- The Clocks are Sleeping / album / released in 2015
- On the Last Days of Esfand / play / directed by: Mohammad Rahmanian / singer (2015)
- Homeland means..., single track for Iran National Team / World Cup 2014 Brazil
- The Flag / single track for Iran team in Inchejun Asian Competitions(2015)
- Chalus Road / TV series / singer (2015). The music video of this series shown for the first time on IRIB
- Innermost Cell / album (2015)
- Winner of the first award in Ghoghnoos for composing Track "Dream Cafe" (2015)
- 360 degree / movie / directed by: Sam Gharibian / singer(2015)
- There will be blood on Wednesday / movie directed by: Hamase Parsa / singer (2015)
- Inverted interpretation of a dream / TV series / directed by: Fereidoun Jeirani / singer (2015)
- Orchestral concert of Masoud Kimiaei Evening Ceremony / conducted by: Behzad Abdi / singer (2016)
- Visual album / Nostalgia (2016)
- Take Off / movie / actor of leading role director: Ehsan Abdipour (2015)
- I am Nasser Hejazi / Documentary / Singer (2015)
- Duel in the Mirror / Album (2016)
- Nurses / TV series / directed by: Alireza Afkhami / Singer (2017)
- The Lost / TV series / directed by: Reza Karimi / Singer (2017)
- The Mix / Album (2017)
- Paykan Javanan / play / directed by: Mohammad Rahmanian / singer (2017)
- Winner of the Musicema best album awards for “Duel in the Mirror” (2017)
- The Pig / movie / actor / directed by Mani Haghighi (2017)
- Several passengers/ theater/ singer & actor/ directed by Mohammad Rahmanian in Mashhad (2018)
- Sophie & the Mad/ movie/ singer & actor/ directed by Mehdi Karampour (2018)
- It's gone from memories/ TV series/ actor & singer/ directed by Bahram Bahramian (2019)
- Street romance/ theater/ actor & singer/ directed by Shahram Gil Abadi (2019)
- Crocodile/ movie/ actor & singer / directed by Masoud Takavar (2019)
- Silent assassination/ TV series/ singer/ directed by Ahmad Moazami (2019)
- The last fiction/ Animation/ singer (in this animation music video)/ directed by Ashkan Rahgozar (2019)
- Virtual Madhouse/ Album (2019)

Yazdani has also performed several works in different ceremonies specifically in terms of movies and cinema.

== Discography ==
- Shahre Del (The City of Heart) (2001)
- Parande Bi Parande (Bird No Bird) (2003)
- Hiss (2006)
- Saate 25 Shab (25:00 pm) (2010)
- Saat-e-Faramoushi (Oblivion Time) (2011)
- Khaterat-e-Mobham (Vague Memories) (2013)
- Saata khaban (Clocks are Sleeping) (2014)
- Selloole Shakhsi (Innermost Cell) (2014)
- Doel Dar Ayeneh (Duel In The Mirror) (2016)
- Darham (The Mixed) (2017)
- Divoonekhooneye Majazi (Virtual Madhouse) (2019)
- Haft Darya (2024)
