= Ajdahak =

Ajdahak may refer to:

- Azhdaha, a dragon-like creature of Indo-Iranian mythology
- Azhdahak (Armenian mythical being)
