= Bahman-nameh =

Persian epic poem

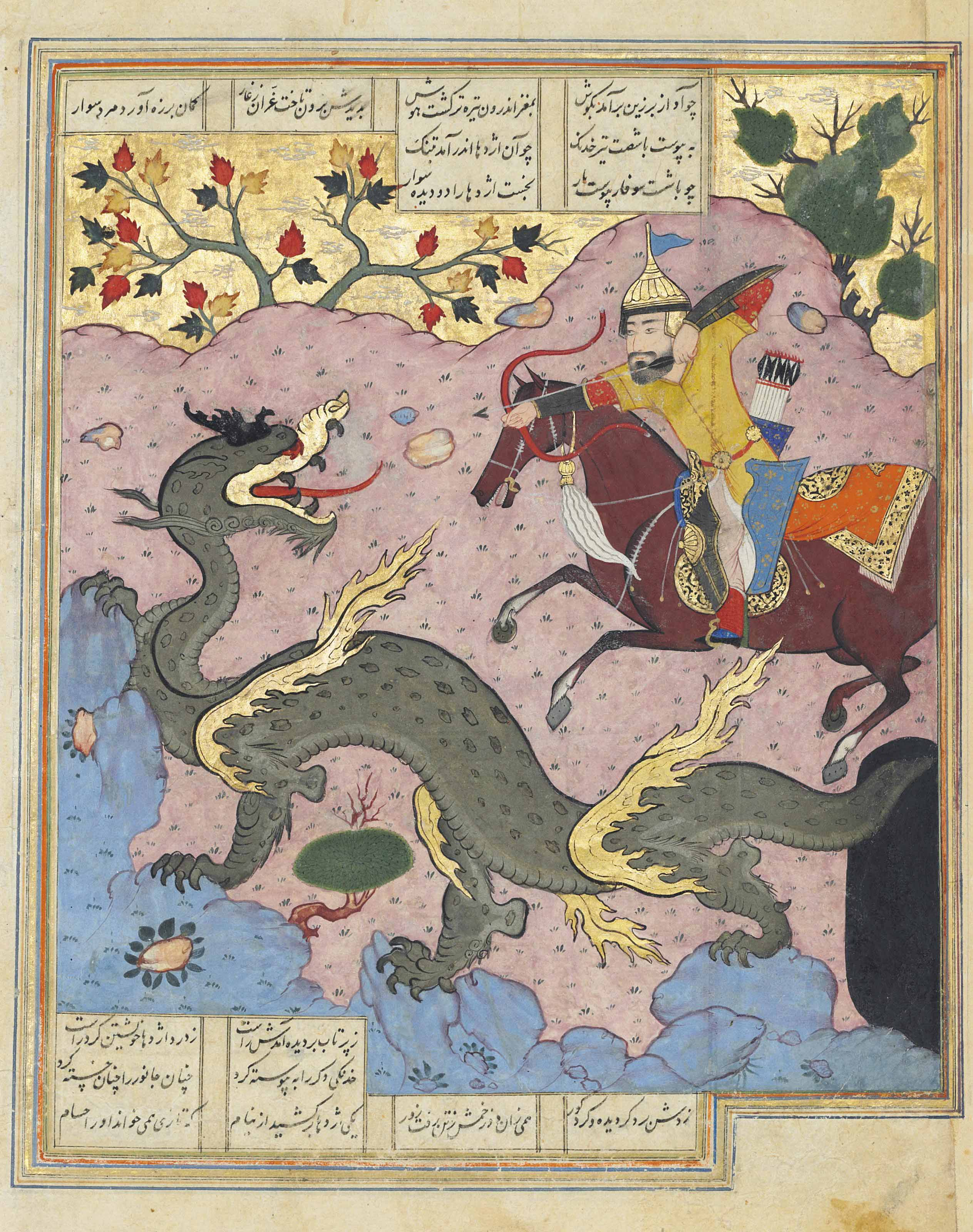
"Azar Barzin killing a dragon", folio from the Bahman-nameh, presumably interpolated into a Shahnameh manuscript. Created in Qazvin, Safavid Iran, dated c. 1560

The Bahman-nameh (Persian: بهمن‌نامه) is a Persian epic poem of around 9500 lines, which describes the adventures of Kay Bahman, the son of Esfandiyār. The earliest attestation of this work is in the book Mojmal al-tawarikh, which gives the author as Iranshan ibn Abi'-Khayr (Iranshah). The poem was likely written and revised between 1092–1093 and 1107–1108. It consist of a prelude and four chapters and was inspired by the constant warfare during the reign of Mahmud I as its patron. The earliest surviving manuscript of the work dates to 1397–1398 and is preserved in the British Museum.

== Structure ==
The poem is about 9,500 line. It contains a prelude and four chapters.

== Authorship ==
The Bahman-nama is an epic poems which told the adventures of Kay Bahman, the son of Esfandiyar. It is first mentioned in the Mojmal al-tawarikh, which names the author as Iranshan ibn Abi'l-Khayr or Iranshah because the first name is difficult to read in the text. Iranshah possibly wrote and revised the Bahman-nama between 1092–1093 and 1107–1108.The summaries also was found in Malekshah Hosayn Sistani's Ehya' al-moluk.Iranshah also mention this poem in his work Kush Nama and iranshah states that the Bahman-nama was inspired by the ceaseless battles and wars of his patron, Seljuk sultans Mahmud I, which reminded him of the ceaseless battles between Bahman and Rostam's family. This implies that the work was also written to serve as advice for solving the socio-political issues of the time.

== Manuscript ==
The earliest known manuscript of the poem dates to 1397–1398 and is held in the British Museum, which also own manuscript from 1836–1837. There is also the which is preserved in the Bodleian Library and the Bibliothèque nationale de France. There is also lithographed edition of the work which was published in Mumbai in 1907–1908.

== Sources ==
- Askari, Nasrin (2016). The medieval reception of the Shāhnāma as a mirror for princes. Brill. ISBN 978-90-04-30790-2.
