= Azhdahak (mythology) =

Demon in Iranian mythology

Azhdahak (Old Armenian: Աժդահակ, also spelled Ashdahak) is the Armenian form of the name of the Avestan demon Azhi Dahaka. In Iranian mythology, he is imprisoned in Mount Damavand, but will at the end of time break out, to be ultimately defeated by Fereydun. In his History of Armenia, the Armenian writer Movses Khorenatsi identified Azhdahak with the Median king Astyages (r. 564–550 BC). Astyages' name (which is the Greek transliteration of the Old Iranian *Aršti-vaiga) was similar to that of Azhdahak, and the name Māda ('Mede') was pronounced in Armenian as mar, which means snake in Iranian languages. The Armenian form Azhdahak was borrowed from Parthian (compare Manichaean Parthian 𐫀𐫋𐫅𐫍𐫀𐫃 ʾjdhʾg).

== See also ==
- List of dragons in mythology and folklore
- Aži Dahāka
  - Zahhak
- Vishap
- Armenian mythology

== Sources ==
- Russell, J. R. (1987). "iv. Armenian Aždahak". In Yarshater, Ehsan (ed.). Encyclopædia Iranica. Vol. III/2: Awāʾel al-maqālāt–Azerbaijan IV. London and New York: Routledge & Kegan Paul. pp. 191–205. ISBN 978-0-71009-114-7.
- Shahbazi, A. Shapur (2017). Badian, Ernst (ed.). "Irano-Hellenic Notes: 1. The Three Faces of Tigranes". American Journal of Ancient History. 2 (2). De Gruyter: 124–136. doi:10.31826/9781463237547-002.
