= Iranshenasi =

Iran Shenasi
- Discipline: Iranian studies
- Language: Persian, with English abstracts
- Edited by: Jalal Matini

Publication details
- History: 1989–present
- Publisher: Keyan Foundation

Standard abbreviations
- ISO 4: Iran Shenasi

Indexing
- ISSN: 1051-5364
- OCLC no.: 603611281

Iran Shenasi also spelled as "Iranshinasi" (Persian: ایران‌شناسی) is an academic journal of Iranian studies. The founding editor-in-chief is Jalal Matini. The journal is published in Persian (with English abstracts) and covers Iranian history, Persian culture, and Persian literature. The majority of research libraries in the world that have a Middle Eastern or Iranian studies program are subscribers and it is considered one of the most authoritative journals on the culture of Iran and Persian literature.

Iranshenasi has sometimes dedicated an entire issue to the remembrance of scholars and artists. Special issues on Parviz Natel-Khanlari, Zabihollah Safa, Ferdowsi, Nizami Ganjavi, Mehrdad Bahar, and Richard N. Frye are examples of these issues.

The publication of the Iranology Quarterly began in 1368 and replaced the Irannameh Quarterly, which was published before that under the management of Dr. Jalal Metini. Iranology magazine was published until the middle of the 13th year (summer 2013) with the financial assistance of the Kian Foundation. Since then, it has been published without any change in form and content, with the words "new period" inserted.
