= Garshasp-nama =

Persian epic poem written by Asadi Tusi

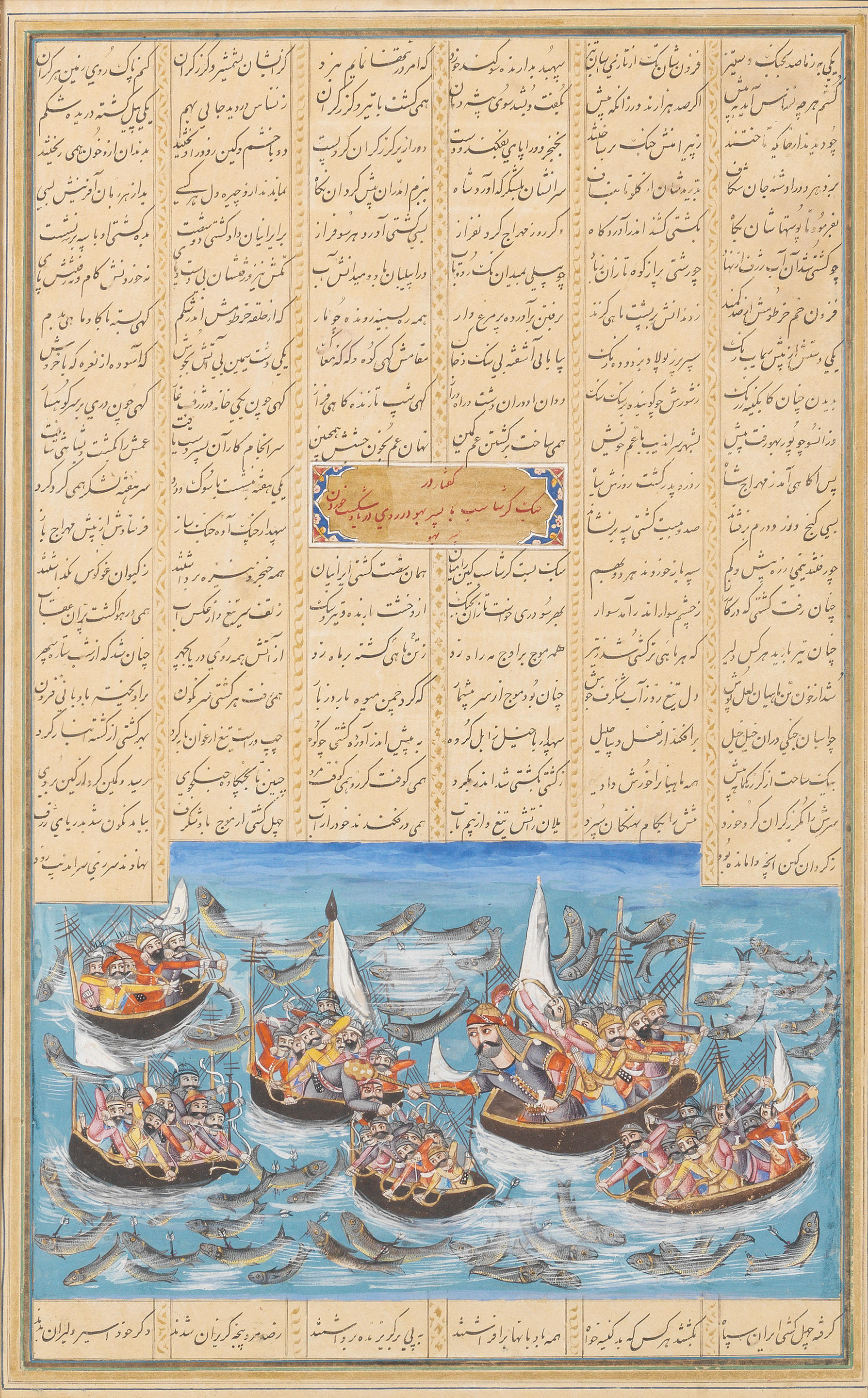
An illustrated leaf from a manuscript of the Garshasp-nama depicting Garshasp and his army fightning a sea battle with the son of Bhu, ruler of Sarandib (Sri Lanka)

The Garshasp-nama (Persian: گرشاسپ‌نامه) is an epic poem by Persian poet Asadi Tusi (died 1072/73). It has been described as one of the best epic poems in Persian literature, comparable to the Shahnameh, by Ferdowsi, and Tusi's most important work. Tusi completed the poem in 1066 and dedicated it to a certain Abu Dulaf, the ruler of Nakhjavan (nothing is known about him). The poem has also been translated to other languages such as French and German. It seems that Tusi wrote this poem based on a written source. Like the Shahnameh, it contains few Arabic loan-words and consists of some 9,000 verses. The main hero of this epic poem is Garshasp, the son of Etret, and grandson of Sām. The poem begins with the story of Jamshid and Zahhak. Jamshid is overthrown by Zahhak and flees to Zabolistan. In Zabolistan, Jamshid falls in love with an unnamed daughter of Kurang, the king of Zabolistan, and she bore a child for Jamshid, named Tur (not to be confused with Tur, the son of Freydun). Jamshid flees again to China. Garshasp is actually the grandson of Tur's grandson.

== Sources ==
- de Blois, François (2000). "Garšāsp-nāma". In Yarshater, Ehsan (ed.). Encyclopædia Iranica. Vol. X/3: Fruit–Gāvbāzī. London and New York: Routledge & Kegan Paul. pp. 318–319. ISBN 978-0-933273-47-4.
