= Jalal Matini =

Persian literature scholar (1928–2025)

- جلال متینی
- Born: 1928; Tehran, Persia
- Died: 19 January 2025 (aged 96); Maryland, U.S.
- Other names: Jalāl Matini
- Occupations: Historian, researcher, educator, journal founder

Jalal Matini (Persian: جلال متینی; 1928 – 19 January 2025) was an Iranian scholar of Persian literature, particularly renowned for his expertise on the epic Shahnameh by Ferdowsi, and contemporary Iranian studies. He is also known for producing the critical edition of the Kush Nama.

Prior to the 1979 Iranian revolution, Matini was a professor and president of the Ferdowsi University of Mashhad (Iran). After emigrating to the United States, Matini taught Persian literature at the University of California, Berkeley and at Harvard University, and founded the journals Iran-Nameh, and Iran-Shenasi. He died on 19 January 2025, at the age of 96.

== Works ==
=== Books ===
- Matini, Jalal (2014). Memories of Jalal Matini About Dr. Ali Shariati in Ferdowsi University / Khaterate Jalale Matini: Doctor Ali Shariati Dar Daneshgah Mashhad /(خاطرات جلال متینی: دکتر علی شریعتی در دانشگاه مشهد ( فردوسی. Ketab.com. p. 273. ISBN 978-1-595-84429-3.
- Matini, Jalal (2009). Negahi Be Karnameye Siasiye Doktor Mohammade Mosadegh. Ketab.com. p. 559. ISBN 978-1-595-84226-8.
- Matini, Jalal (2007). Iran Over the Centuries. Ketab Corp. p. 400.
- Matini, Jalal (2017). Why Islamic?!: collection of articles (Persian ed.). CreateSpace Independent Publishing Platform. p. 134. ISBN 978-1-974-12973-7.
- Matini, Jalal (2017). Eighteen Articles (Hejdah Maghaleh) (Persian ed.). CreateSpace Independent Publishing Platform. p. 254. ISBN 978-1-981-42909-7.

=== Other publications/articles ===
Virtually all of Jalal Matini's work are in Persian but he has also written some English articles.

- J. Matini, "Kush-Nama" in Mahmoud Omidsalar (Author), A. Tafazzoli (Editor), Touraj Daryaee "The Spirit of Wisdom: Menog I Xrad : Essays in Memory of Ahmad Tafazzoli", Mazda Publishers (September 2003).
- J. Matini, "ĀFARĪN-NĀMA" in Encyclopædia Iranica
- J. Matini, "HEDĀYAT AL-MOTAʿALLEMIN FI’L-ṬEBB" in Encyclopædia Iranica
- J. Matini, "ʿAMĀRA MARVAZĪ" in Encyclopædia Iranica
- J. Matini, "AFIFI, RAḤIM" in Encyclopædia Iranica
- J. Matini, "ADĪB NĪŠĀBURĪ" in Encyclopædia Iranica
- J. Matini, "ʿAMʿAQ BOḴARĀʾĪ" in Encyclopædia Iranica
- J. Matini, "ḤABIB-ALLĀH ḴORĀSĀNI" in Encyclopædia Iranica
- J. Matini, "BAHMANYĀR AḤMAD" in Encyclopædia Iranica
- J. Matini, "FAYYĀŻ, ʿALĪ-AKBAR MAJĪDĪ" in Encyclopædia Iranica
- J. Matini, "FARROḴ, Sayyed MAḤMŪD" in Encyclopædia Iranica
- J. Matini, "AYĀZ, ABU’L-NAJM" in Encyclopædia Iranica
- J. Matini, "ĀẔAR BĪGDELĪ" in Encyclopædia Iranica
- J. Matīnī, "ʿAWFĪ, SADĪD-AL-DĪN" in Encyclopædia Iranica
- J. Matini, "KUŠ-NĀMA" in Encyclopædia Iranica
- J. Matīnī, M. Caton, "ʿĀREF QAZVĪNĪ" in Encyclopædia Iranica

== See also ==
- Iran Shenasi
- Iranian studies
