= Ashkan Rahgozar =

Iranian author and filmmaker

- Born: Ashkan Rahgozar; 12 April 1986; Tehran, Iran
- Occupations: Director, animator, film producer
- Board member of: Hoorakhsh Studio

Ashkan Rahgozar (born 12 April 1986) is an Iranian author, director and filmmaker specialising in animated movies. He is the founder and chief executive of Hoorakhsh Studios.

== Career ==
Ashkan began his animation career in Saba Animation Centre in 1999, before establishing animation production studio, Hoorakhsh 7th Sky, in 2005. Hoorakhsh 7th Sky produces 2D computer animations for promotional and commercial purposes. Since then, Ashkan has continued to write and direct both short and feature animation films.

== Filmography ==
=== Animated feature ===
- 2008–2017, "The Last Fiction" Animated Feature (author/director/producer)
- 2021–2024, Juliet and the King Animated Feature (author/director)
- 2022–2027, The Dragon's Treasure Animated Feature (author/director)

=== Animated short ===
- 2006, "Epic of Tirgan" Animated Short (author/director/animator)
- 2006, "The Short Part" Animated Short (author/director/animator)
- 2006, "Café Dulape" Animated Short (author/director/[producer)
- 2007, "Qajari’s Cat" Animated Short (author/director/producer)
- 2007, "Ramadan Month" Episodic Animations
- 2007, "Question Mark" Animated Short (editor/producer)
- 2007, "Passive Defense" Animated Short (supervisor of animators)
- 2007, "Qeimeh" Animated Short (supervisor of animators)
- 2009, "Always Pars" Animated Documentary (supervisor of animators)
- 2009, "You …!" Animated Short (author/director/producer)
- 2009, "In Waves of the Sindh" Animated Short (editor/producer)
- 2009, "Vise Versa" Animated Short (producer)
- 2009, "Zagho Panir" Animated Short (supervisor of animators)
- 2013, "Tormented Sleep" Animated Short (counselor/producer)
- 2013, "Prey" Animated Short (counselor/producer)
- 2013, "Cut..!" Animated Short (author/producer)

=== Music videos ===
- Music video of "If You Go Away" – Shirley Bassey
- Music video of "Pegasus" – King Raam
- Music video of "Ishala" – Bomrani Band
- Music videos of Siamak Abbasi, Mohammad Ali Salahshoor, and Mahdi Yarahi (producer)

== Awards ==
- Invitation of "The Last Fiction" by Annecy Animation Festival to a program named "Annecy goes to Cannes" for presenting in "Cannes film festival". 2016
- "The Last Fiction" – Winner of the Cocomix Music Award from Bucheon International Animation Festival
- "The Last Fiction" – Winner of Best Animated Movie from International Animation Festival AJAYU – Peru, 2019
- "The Last Fiction" – Winner of Best Animated Movie, Epic ACG fest, 2019
- "The Last Fiction" – Crystal Simorgh for Best Animated Feature from Fajr International Film Festival, 2019
- "The Last Fiction" – Winner of Best Director, Best Screen Play and Special Jury Awards, from International Film Festival for Children and Youth, Isfahan, 2018
- "The Last Fiction" – Winner of Best Animation Movie from Southern Cone International Film Festival, 2019
- "The Last Fiction" – Best Animation Feature Film from GIRAF International Festival of Independent Animation, 2018
- "The Last Fiction" – Best Animated Feature and Best International Animated Feature from Tehran Animation Festival, 2018
- "You!" – Honorary Diploma for the animated short "You!" at Tehran International Animation Festival
- Silver Statue for creating unique projects from Tehran International Animation Festival.
