= Kātouzian =

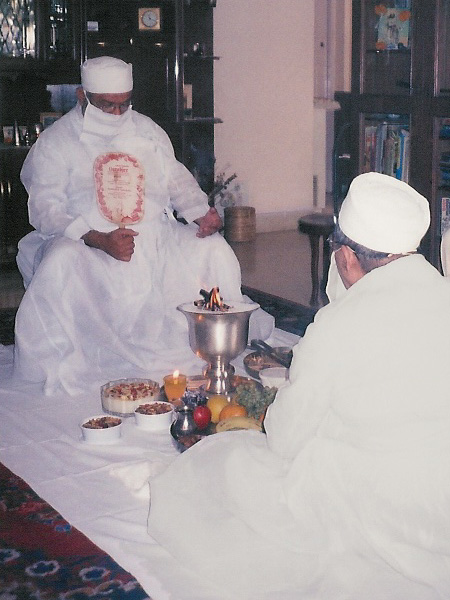
Zoroastrians Spiritual Ceremony

Kātouzian in Zoroastrianism refers to the priests at the time of Jamshid who conducted the worship of Hormozd. They used to dwell in mountains and caves, praying and looking for wisdom. The word Kātouzian (Persian: کاتوزیان) itself is a plural form of the word Kātouzi (Persian: کاتوزی).

According to Shahnameh, Jamshid had divided the people into four groups:

- Kātouzians
- Neysārians: The warriors who protected the people by the might of their arms
- Nāsoudians: The farmers who grew the grain that fed the people
- Hotokhoshians: The artisans, who produced goods for the ease and enjoyment of the people

In Shahnameh, Ferdowsi says:

Then to the joy of all he founded castes
For every craft; it took him fifty years.
Distinguishing one caste as sacerdotal
To be employed in sacred offices,
He separated it from other folk
And made its place of service on the mountains
That God might be adored in quietude.

== See also ==
- Magi
