= Mojmal al-Tawarikh =

12th century chronicle of Persian Kings

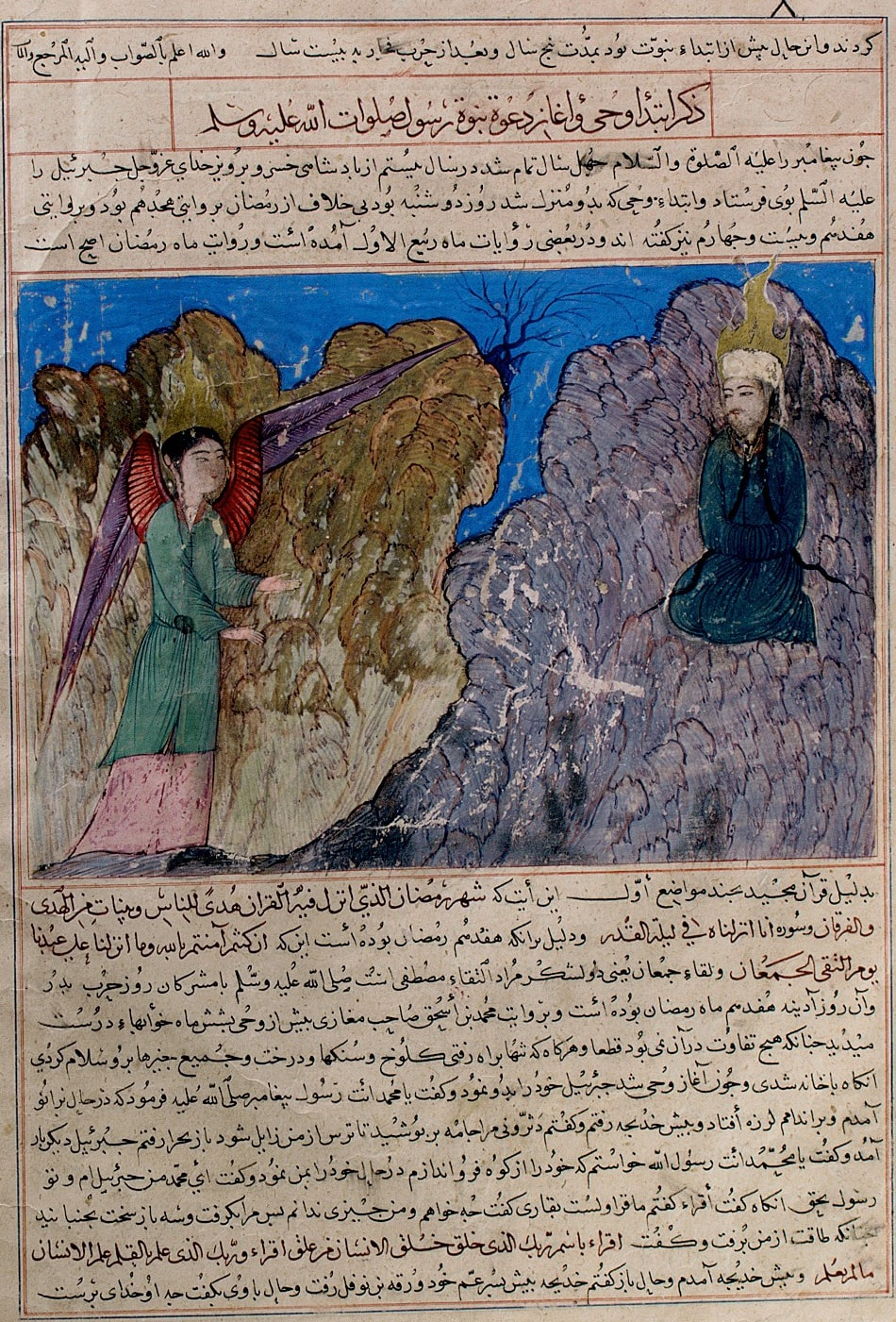
A copy of the book from Herat, dated 1425 CE. Depicted are Muhammad and the archangel Gabriel. Script is in Persian language.

Mojmal al-tawarikh wa-l-qesas (Persian: مُجمل التواریخ و القصص, lit. 'The Collection of Histories and Tales') was a book written in Ghaznavid Persia (c. 1126).

The book is a chronicle mostly of Persian kings, and is often cited as a source of reference for historical events of the 12th century and before. It refers to the classical Persian Shahnameh as the "tree" and all other poems as "branches".

Some authors have claimed the name of the author to be Ibn Shadi Asad abadi (ابن شادی اسدآبادی). The book was first edited in 1939 by Mohammad-Taqi Bahar in Tehran.

Another book with the same title was written by Fasihuddin Ahmad in 1441.

== Sources ==
- Askari, Nasrin (2016). The medieval reception of the Shāhnāma as a mirror for princes. Brill. ISBN 978-90-04-30790-2.
- Weber, Siegfried; Riedel, Dagmar (2012). "MOJMAL AL-TAWĀRIḴ WA'L-QEṢAṢ". Encyclopaedia Iranica.
