= Faranak =

Female character in Persian epic

Farānak (Persian: فَرانَک) is a female character in the Persian epic Shahnameh. She is married to Abtin and the mother of Fereydun.

== Etymology ==
Farânak is derived from the word Parvâneh, which means "butterfly" in Persian. Like many other words and names in Persian, the letter P was transformed to F in post-Arabic period, as the letter P does not exist in Arabic. Parvânak, meaning "the little butterfly", is another name for the Persian lynx or caracal, also called siâh-goosh سیاه‌گوش, which means "black-eared" in Persian. Both the name siâh-goosh ("black-eared") and parvânak ("little butterfly") refer to the pointy long black ears of the Persian lynx that look like butterflies. The Persian lynx or caracal accompanies the lion as the lion is a strong hunter and often leaves some food for the lynx which is a much smaller cat. In return, the lynx has a much stronger sense of smell and can lead the lion to the prey.

== Attestation ==
Farânak as a female name was first documented in Shâhnameh, for the character who was married to the good man Abtin, and the mother of the character Fereydun, a great hero who later became a king. The name for the character Farânak, who stood by these strong men, may have created and inspired by the story of the relationship between the Persian lynx and the lion; she who walks in front of the lions.
