= Zahhak =

Evil figure in Iranian legend

Aži Dahāka
- Shahnameh, Iranian mythology character
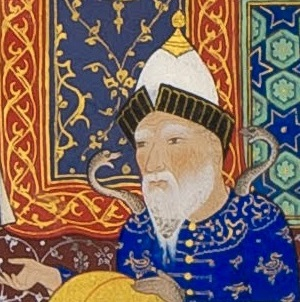
- Zahhak enthroned with snakes on his shoulders, from the Shahnameh of Shah Tahmasp.
- First appearance: Avesta (Aban Yasht)
- Based on: Possible real king of unknown identity
- Adapted by: Ferdowsi

In-universe information
- Full name: Aži Dahāka (in Avesta), Zahhak-e Mar-Dush (Zahhak the Snake-Shouldered)
- Alias: Bivar-Asb
- Species: Human (initially a dragon/demon in Avestan texts)
- Gender: Male
- Title: King of Babylon
- Occupation: Ruler
- Affiliation: Ahriman (Angra Mainyu)
- Family: Avesta: Spitiiura (brother) Pahlavi texts: Arwadasp / Urwadasp (father), Wadag / Ōdag (mother) Bundahišn: Khrutasp (father), Udai (maternal ancestor), Bayak (maternal ancestor), Tambayak (maternal ancestor), Owokhm (maternal ancestor), Pairi-urvaesm (maternal ancestor), Gadhwithw (maternal ancestor), Drujaskan (maternal ancestor), Ahriman (ultimate maternal ancestor) Shahnameh: Merdas (father), Mehrab (descendant through later genealogy)
- Spouses: Arnavaz and Shahrnaz
- Children: Sarnafiwar & Nafawar (in later Islamic narratives)
- Origin: Kuuiriṇta in Baβri (traditionally identified with Babylon)
- Nationality: Arabian or Babylonian

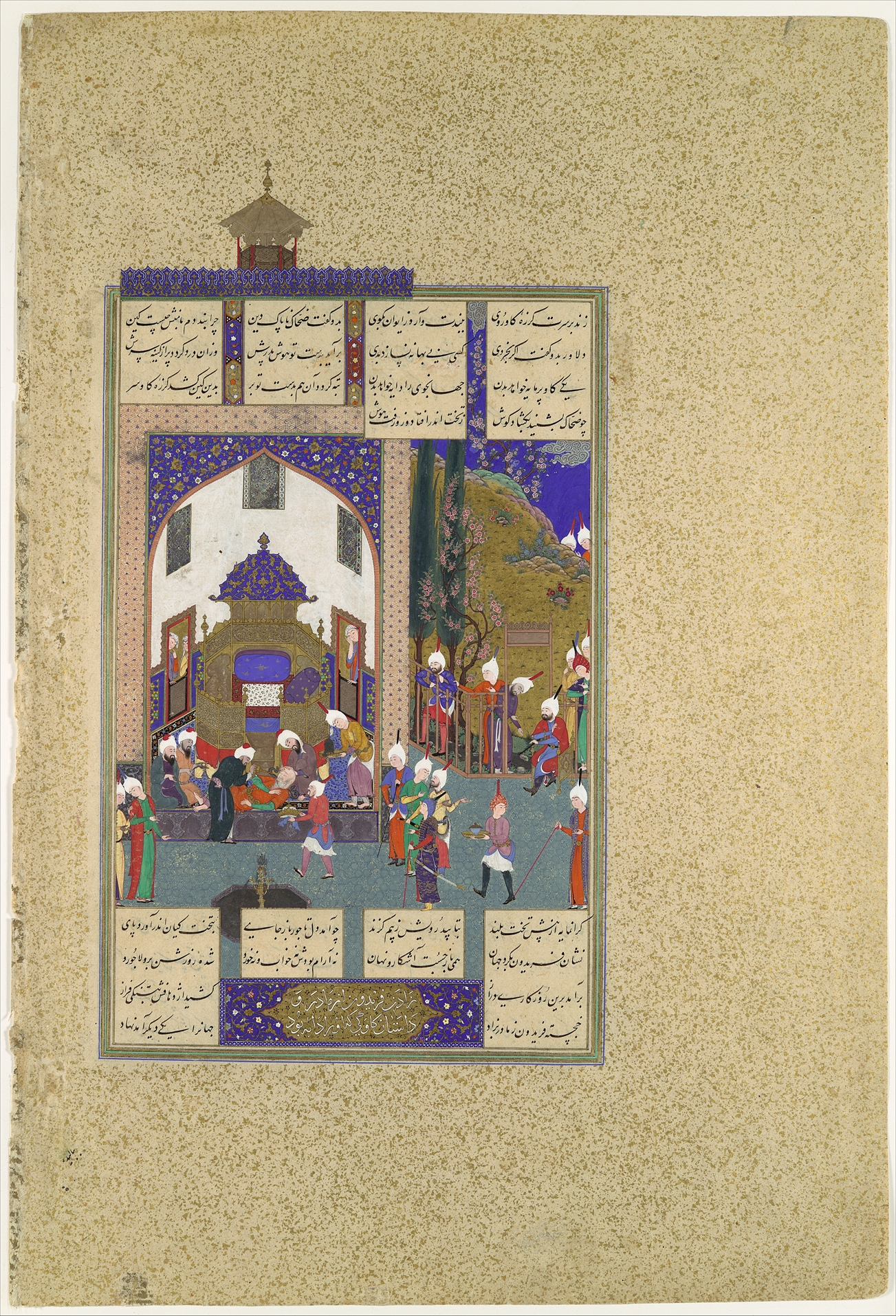
Zahhak awakens in terror from his nightmare at the birth of Fereydun.

Aži Dahāka (Avestan: 𐬀𐬰𐬌 𐬛𐬀𐬵𐬁𐬐𐬀; Middle Persian: Dahāg; Persian: اژی دهاک / ضحاک; Kurdish: ئەژدەهاک) also known as Zahāk (Note: Zahāk: Persian: ضحّاک Also referred to under various names, including: Zahhak the Snake Shoulder: Persian: ضحاک ماردوش, romanized: Zahhāk-e Mārdoush Azhi Dahāka: Persian: اژی دهاک, the name by which he also appears in the texts of the Avesta. In Middle Persian he is called Dahāg (Persian: دهاگ) or Bēvar Asp (Persian: بیور اسپ) the latter meaning "he who has 10,000 horses".) is the king of Babylon and personification of evil in Iranian mythology and historiography. In the Avesta and Zoroastrian tradition, Zahāk is considered the son of Ahriman, the foe (though ultimately subservient) of Ahura Mazda. In the Shāhnāmeh of Ferdowsi, Zahāk is the son of an Arab ruler named Merdās.

No trace or text of this king has been found in the Babylonian King List, and some trace his origins back to the Median king Astyages. Some also suggest that he may have had connections to the Babylonian god Ningishzida or the Babylonian dragon Asag, Despite this, some Muslim scholars have conflated him with the biblical figure Nimrod.

== Etymology and derived words ==
Aži (nominative ažiš) is the Avestan word for "serpent" or "dragon". It is cognate to the Vedic Sanskrit word ahi, "snake", and without a sinister implication.

The original meaning of dahāka is uncertain. Among the meanings suggested are "stinging" (source uncertain), "burning" (cf. Sanskrit dahana), "man" or "manlike" (cf. Khotanese daha), "huge" or "foreign" (cf. the Dahae people and the Vedic dasas). In Persian mythology, Dahāka is treated as a proper noun, while the form Zahhāk, which appears in the Shāhnāmeh, was created through the influence of the unrelated Arabic word ḍaḥḥāk (ضَحَّاك) meaning "one who laughs".

The Avestan term Aži Dahāka and the Middle Persian aždahāg are the source of the Middle Persian Manichaean demon of greed Až, Old Armenian mythological figure Aždahak, Modern Persian 'aždehâ/aždahâ', (اژدها) Tajik Persian 'aždaho', (аждаҳо) Urdu 'aždahā' (اژدہا), as well as the Kurdish ejdîha (ئەژدیها) which usually mean "dragon".

The name also migrated to Eastern Europe, assumed the form "ažhdaja" and the meaning "dragon", "dragoness" or "water snake" in Balkanic and Slavic languages.

Despite the negative aspect of Aži Dahāka in mythology, dragons have been used on some banners of war throughout the history of Iranian peoples.

The Ažhdarchid group of pterosaurs are named from a Persian word for "dragon" that ultimately comes from Aži Dahāka.

== Aži Dahāka (Dahāg) in Zoroastrian literature ==
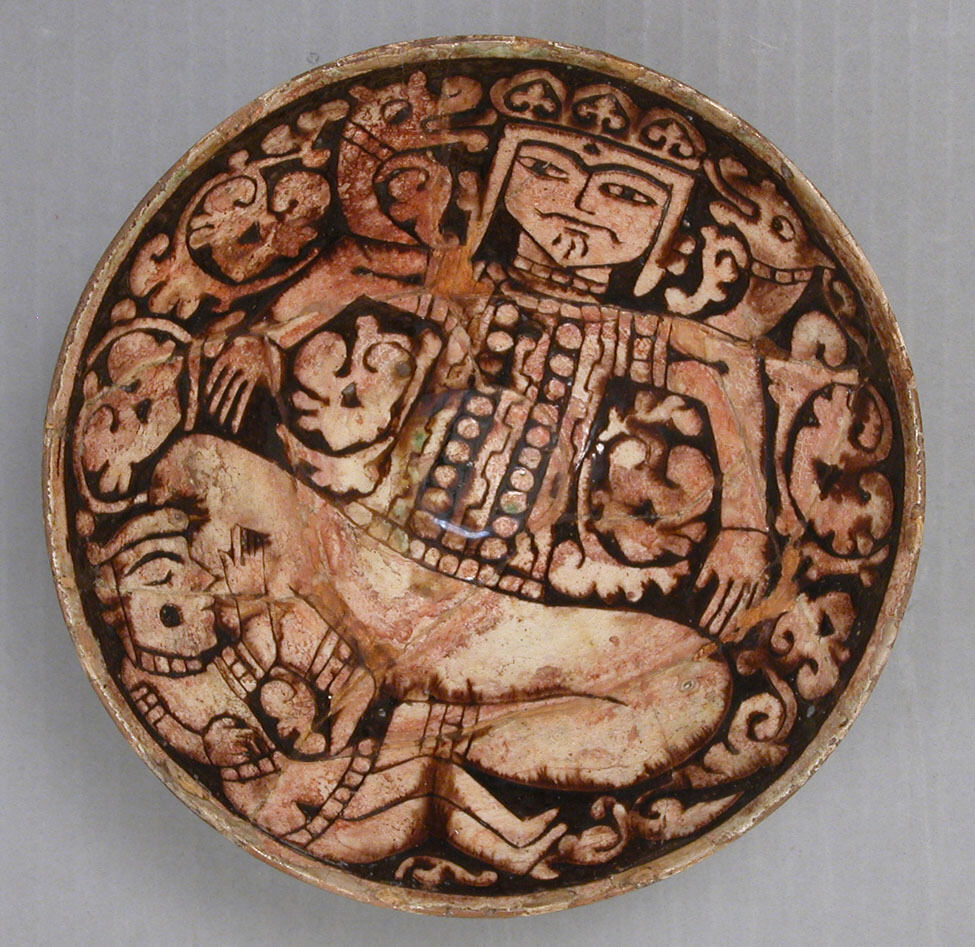
12th–13th century bowl depicting King Zahhak with snakes protruding from his shoulders, likely from Northwestern Iran. Modified c. 1926, as many medieval pieces were to make them more attractive.

In the Avesta, the collection of religious texts of Zoroastrianism, Aži Dahāka is the most significant and long-lasting of the ažis. He is described as a monster with three mouths, six eyes, and three heads, cunning, strong, and demonic. In other respects Aži Dahāka has human qualities, and is never a mere animal.

Aži Dahāka appears in several of the Avestan myths and is mentioned parenthetically in many more places in Zoroastrian literature.

In a post-Avestan Zoroastrian text, the Dēnkard, Aži Dahāka is possessed of all possible sins and evil counsels, the opposite of the good king Jam (or Jamshid). The name Dahāg (Dahāka) is punningly interpreted as meaning "having ten (dah) sins". His mother is Wadag (or Ōdag), herself described as a great sinner, who committed incest with her son.

In the Avesta, Aži Dahāka is said to have lived in the inaccessible fortress of Kuuirinta in the land of Baβri, where he worshipped the yazatas Arədvī Sūrā (Anāhitā), divinity of the rivers, and Vayu divinity of the storm-wind. Based on the similarity between Baβri and Old Persian Bābiru (Babylon), later Zoroastrians localized Aži Dahāka in Mesopotamia, though the identification is open to doubt. Aži Dahāka asked these two yazatas for power to depopulate the world. Being representatives of the Good, they refused.

In one Avestan text, Aži Dahāka has a brother named Spitiyura. Together they attack the hero Yima (Jamshid) and cut him in half with a saw, but are then beaten back by the yazata Ātar, the divine spirit of fire.

According to the post-Avestan texts, following the death of Jam ī Xšēd (Jamshid), Dahāg gained kingly rule. Another late Zoroastrian text, the Mēnog ī xrad, says this was ultimately good, because if Dahāg had not become king, the rule would have been taken by the immortal demon Xešm (Aēšma), and so evil would have ruled upon the earth until the end of the world.

Dahāg is said to have ruled for a thousand years, starting from 100 years after Jam lost his Khvarenah, his royal glory (see Jamshid). He is described as a sorcerer who ruled with the aid of demons, the daevas (divs).

The Avesta identifies the person who finally disposed of Aži Dahāka as Θraētaona son of Aθβiya, in Middle Persian called Frēdōn. The Avesta has little to say about the nature of Θraētaona's defeat of Aži Dahāka, other than that it enabled him to liberate Arənavāci and Savaŋhavāci, the two most beautiful women in the world. Later sources, especially the Dēnkard, provide more detail. Feyredon is said to have been endowed with the divine radiance of kings (Khvarenah, New Persian farr) for life, and was able to defeat Dahāg, striking him with a mace. However, when he did so, vermin (snakes, insects and the like) emerged from the wounds, and the god Ormazd told him not to kill Dahāg, lest the world become infected with these creatures. Instead, Frēdōn chained Dahāg up and imprisoned him on the mythical Mt. Damāvand (later identified with Damāvand).

The Middle Persian sources also prophesy that at the end of the world, Dahāg will at last burst his bonds and ravage the world, consuming one in three humans and livestock. Kirsāsp, the ancient hero who had killed the Az ī Srūwar, returns to life to kill Dahāg.

In the Denkard, Zahhak is said to be the originator of Judaism "Denkard, Book 3, Chapter 288". Avesta.org.

== Zahhak in the Shahnameh ==
In Ferdowsi's epic poem, the Shāhnāmeh, written between 977 and 1010, the legend is retold with the main character given the name of Zahhāk and changed from a supernatural monster into an evil human being.

=== Zahhāk in Persia ===
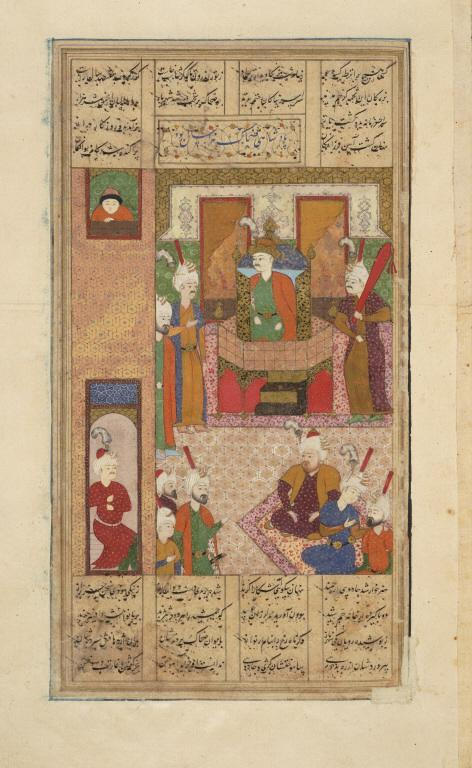
Persian painting, depicting Zahhāk ascending on the royal throne.

According to Ferdowsi, Zahhāk was born as the son of a ruler named Merdās (Persian: مرداس). Because of his Arab lineage, he is sometimes called Zahhāk-e Tāzī (Persian: ضحاکِ تازی), meaning "Zahhāk the Tayyi". He is handsome and clever, but has no stability of character and is easily influenced by his counselors. Ahriman therefore chooses him as a tool to sow disorder and chaos. When Zahhāk is a young man, Ahriman first appears to him as a glib, flattering companion, and by degrees convinces him to kill his own father and inherit his kingdom, treasures and army. Zahhāk digs a deep pit covered over with leaves in a path to a garden where Merdās would pray each morning; Merdās falls in and is killed. Zahhāk thus ascends to the throne.

Ahriman then presents himself to Zahhāk as a marvelous cook. After he presents Zahhāk with many days of sumptuous feasts (introducing meat to the formerly vegetarian human cuisine), Zahhāk is willing to give Ahriman whatever he wants. Ahriman merely asks to kiss Zahhāk on his two shoulders, and Zahhāk permits this. Ahriman places his lips upon Zahhāk's shoulders and suddenly disappears. At once, two black snakes grow from Zahhāk's shoulders. They cannot be surgically removed, as another snake grows to replace one that has been severed. Ahriman appears to Zahhāk in the form of a skilled physician. He counsels Zahhāk that attempting to remove the snakes is fruitless, and that the only means of soothing the snakes and preventing them from killing him is to sate their hunger by supplying them with a stew made from two human brains every day.

=== Zahhāk the Emperor ===
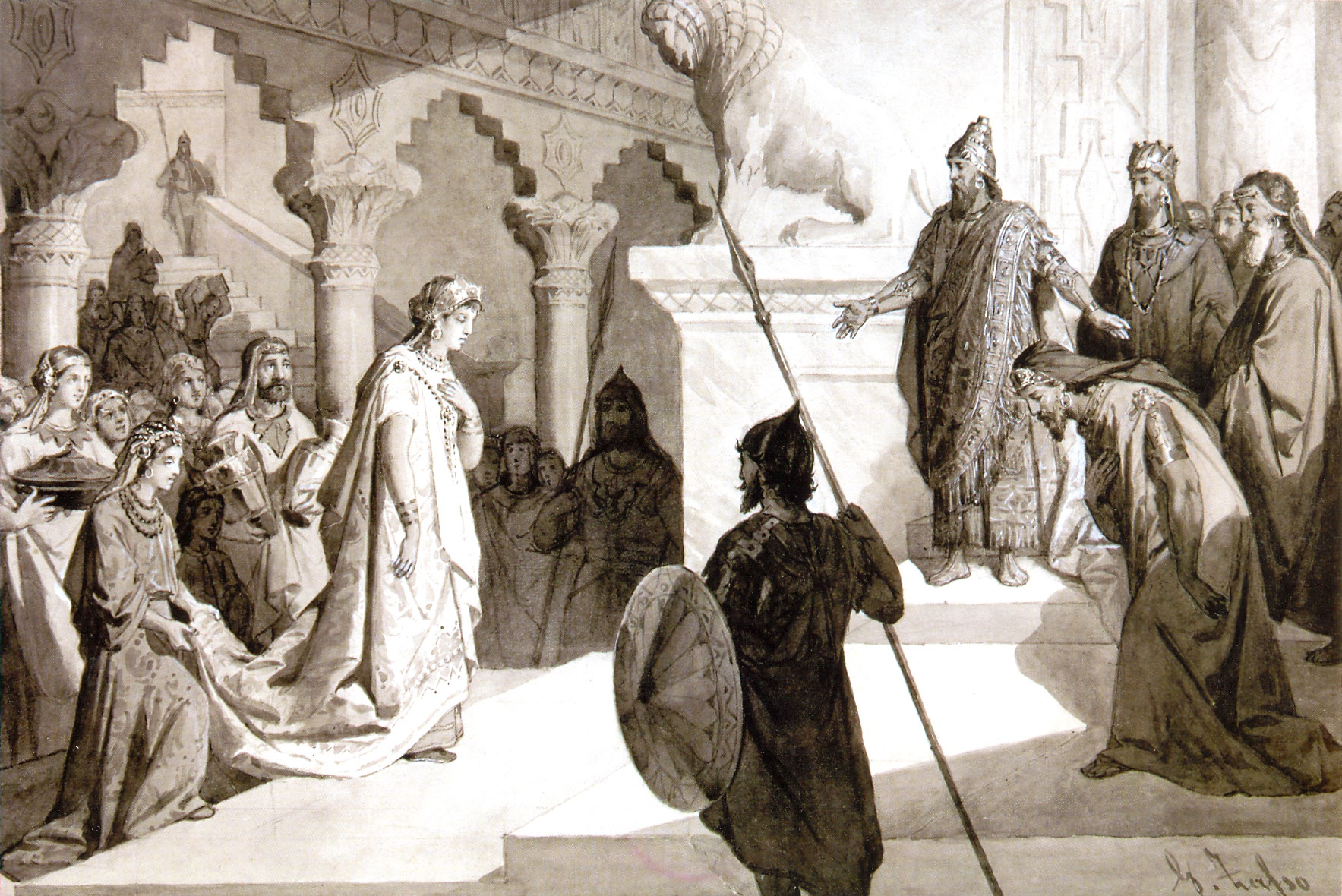
Armenian Princess Tigranuhi, daughter of Orontes I Sakavakyats, before wedding with Ajdahak. Azhdahak is identified as Astyages in Armenian sources.

At this time, Jamshid, the ruler of the world, becomes arrogant and loses his divine right to rule. Zahhāk presents himself as a savior to discontented Iranians seeking a new ruler. Collecting a great army, Zahhāk hunts Jamshid for many years before finally capturing him. Zahhāk executes Jamshid by sawing him in half and ascends to Jamshid's prior throne. Among his slaves are two of Jamshid's daughters, Arnavāz and Shahrnāz (the Avestan Arənavāci and Savaŋhavāci). Each day, Zahhāk's agents seize two men and execute them so that their brains can feed Zahhāk's snakes. Two men, called Armayel and Garmayel, seek to rescue people from being killed from the snakes by learning cookery and becoming Zahhāk's royal chefs. Each day, Armayel and Garmayel save one of the two men by sending him off to the mountains and faraway plains, and substitute the man's brain with that of a sheep. The saved men are the mythological progenitors of the Kurds.

Zahhāk's tyranny over the world lasts for centuries. One night, Zahhāk dreams of three warriors attacking him. The youngest warrior knocks Zahhāk down with his mace, ties him up, and drags him off toward Mount Damāvand as a large crowd follows. Zahhāk wakes and shouts so loudly that the pillars of the palace shake. Following Arnavāz's counsel, Zahhāk summons wise men and scholars to interpret his dream. His hesitant counsellors remain silent until the most fearless of the men reports that the dream is a vision of the end of Zahhāk's reign at the hands of Fereydun, the young man with the mace. Zahhāk is thrilled to learn the identity of his enemy, and orders his agents to search the entire country for Fereydun and capture him. The agents learn that Fereydun is a boy being nourished on the milk of the marvelous cow Barmāyeh. The spies trace Barmāyeh to the highland meadows where it grazes, but Fereydun and his mother have already fled before them. The agents kill the cow, but are forced to return to Zahhāk with their mission unfulfilled.

=== Revolution against Zahhāk ===
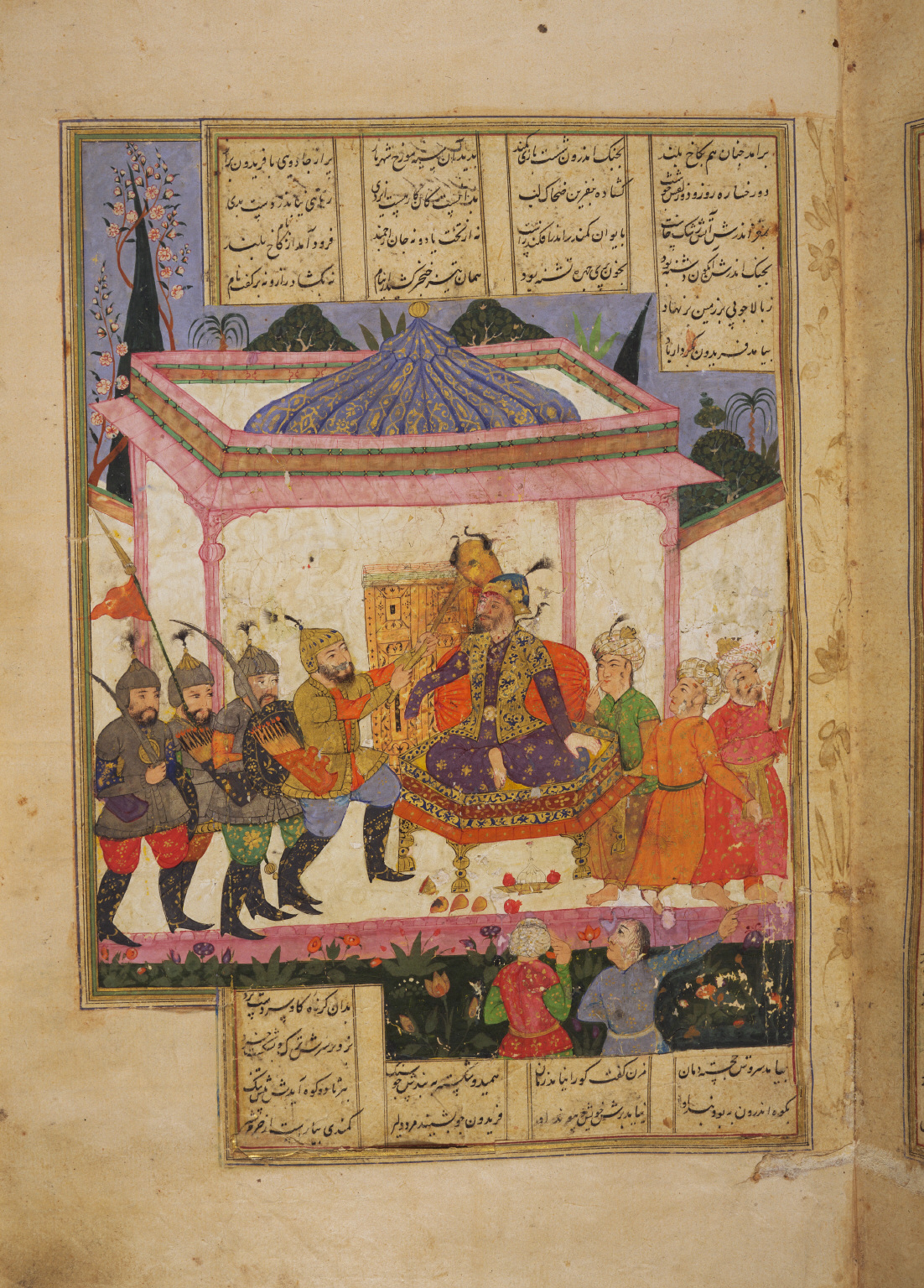
Fereydun defeats Zahhak

Zahhāk lives the next few years in fear and anxiety of Fereydun, and thus writes a document testifying to the virtue and righteousness of his kingdom that would be certified by the kingdom's elders and social elite, in the hope that his enemy would be convinced against exacting vengeance. Much of the summoned assembly indulge the testimony out of fear for their lives. However, a blacksmith named Kāva (Kaveh) speaks out in anger for his children having been murdered to feed Zahhāk's snakes, and for his final remaining son being sentenced to the same fate. Zahhāk orders for Kāva's son to be released in a bid to coerce Kāva into certifying the document, but Kāva tears up the document, leaves the court, and creates a flag out of his blacksmith's apron as a standard of rebellion – the Kāviyāni Banner, derafsh-e Kāviyānī (درفش کاویانی). Kāva proclaims himself in support of Fereydun as ruler, and rallies a crowd to follow him to the Alborz mountains, where Fereydun is now living as a young man. Fereydun agrees to lead the people against Zahhāk and has a mace made for him with a head like that of an ox.

Fereydun goes forth to fight against Zahhāk, who has already left his capital, which falls to Fereydun with small resistance. Fereydun frees all of Zahhāk's prisoners, including Arnavāz and Shahrnāz. Kondrow, Zahhāk's treasurer, pretends to submit to Fereydun, but discreetly escapes to Zahhāk and reports to him what has happened. Zahhāk initially dismisses the matter, but he is incensed to learn that Fereydun has seated Jamshid's daughters on thrones beside him like his queens, and immediately hastens back to his city to attack Fereydun. Zahhāk finds his capital held strongly against him, and his army is in peril from the defense of the city. Seeing that he cannot reduce the city, he sneaks into his own palace as a spy and attempts to assassinate Arnavāz and Shahrnāz. Fereydun strikes Zahhāk down with his ox-headed mace, but does not kill him; on the advice of an angel, he binds Zahhāk and imprisons him in a cave underneath Mount Damāvand. Fereydun binds Zahhāk with a lion's pelt tied to great nails fixed into the walls of the cavern, where Zahhāk will remain until the end of the world.

== Islamic narratives of Zahhak ==
Ibn Jarir al-Tabari, narrating from Hisham ibn al-Kalbi, states in his historical chronicle Tarikh al-Tabari ("History of Tabari") that Zahhak was a tyrannical Himyarite or Sabaean king named Al-Dahhak ibn ‘Alwan, who appointed his brother Sinan as the first Pharaoh of Egypt. Islamic historian Abu al-Fida also argues that the snakes on the shoulders of Zahhak were actually large tumours that were able to move as if they were additional limbs, which allowed Zahhak to use them to frighten his victims and make them submit to him.

Al-Tabari, in his famous book The History of Prophets and Kings, quoted the historian Hisham ibn Muhammad as saying: “It has reached us, though Allah knows best, that Al-Dahhak was Nimrod, that Abraham, the Friend of the Most Merciful, was born during his reign, and that he was the very ruler who sought to burn him alive.” According to this view, the tyrant who disputed with the Prophet Abraham (peace be upon him) over the question of divinity was none other than the serpent-king of Iranian mythology.

Islamic histories, such as that of Tabari, narrate that his brother, Sinan, was contemporary to the patriarch Abraham, while the 10th-century Akhbar al-Zaman and the works of Murtada ibn al-Afif instead replace Sinan with an uncertain Thutmose; Egyptologist and museum curator Ahmad Kamal instead separates the two and declares that Sinan and Thutmose are two different people, the former being the first king of the Hyksos, with the latter being a dramatized version of Thutmose I.

Tabari also says that Zahhak was the first ruler to mint dirhams, implement crucifixion as punishment, and be sung to.

== Place names ==
''Shahr-e Zuhak'' is located in today's Bamyan, Hazarajat region in Afghanistan, which the local people of that region consider to be the main seat of Zahhak.

"Zahhak Castle" is the name of an ancient ruin in Hashtrud, East Azerbaijan Province, Iran which according to various experts, was inhabited from the second millennia BC until the Timurid-era. First excavated in the 19th century by British archeologists, Iran's Cultural Heritage Organization has been studying the structure in 6 phases.

== In popular culture ==
- The tale of Zahhak's defeat of Jamshid and subsequent defeat to Fereydun serves as the backstory of the 1992 Sega Game Gear video game Defenders of Oasis. A descendant of Zahhak is a major antagonist in the game's plot.
- In the Xenaverse, Zahhak (referred to as Dahak) is the supernatural adversary whom both Xena and later Hercules on Hercules: The Legendary Journeys must defeat in order to save the world from utter destruction. When Dahak appears on Hercules, his appearance is like a crustacean.
- In Final Fantasy Legend III (known outside the United States as SaGa 3), intermediate boss Dahak is depicted as a multiple-headed lizard.
- In Prince of Persia: Warrior Within, the Prince of Persia flees from a powerful shadowy figure called The Dahaka.
- In Future Card Buddyfight, the buddy of the main antagonist is named Demonic Demise Dragon, Azi Dahaka.
- The Marvel MAX Terror Inc. issues feature an immortal villain named Zahhak, bound to two demonic snakes. Unless fed with other people's brains, they start eating his own.
- In the Quest Corporation video game Ogre Battle 64: Person of Lordly Caliber, Ahzi Dahaka is a venerable dragon of the Earth element that is commonly encountered during the latter half of the game.
- In High School DxD, Azi Dahaka is an evil dragon who leads an antagonist group with another evil dragon named Apophis.
- In Homestuck, Equius Zahhak is the name of one of the Trolls
- In the light novel series Problem Children Are Coming from Another World, Aren't They?, Azi Dahaka is represented as a three-headed white dragon and is one of the main antagonists in the series.
- In the Shadowverse card game Azi Dahaka appear as a legendary Dragoncraft-class card come from Chronogenesis Expansion.
- In the Pathfinder Roleplaying Game, Dahak is the god of chromatic dragons, and the son of the dragons Apsu and Tiamat. He seeks to kill his father and reign over all dragonkind.
- Aži Dahāka served as an inspiration for the boss Azhdaha (Chinese: 若陀龙王) in Genshin Impact, a legendary dragon (Vishap) sealed underground by Liyue's Geo Archon, Morax.
- In Fate/Grand Order, Aži Dahāka is one of the Divine Spirits infused into the Alter Ego-class Servant Grigori Rasputin, and appears in his Noble Phantasm Zazhiganiye Angra Mainyu.
- In That Time I Got Reincarnated as a Slime, Azi Dahaka, Lord of Evil Dragons is the Ultimate Skill of Vega.
- In the novelization of God of War II, Zahhak is mentioned as a false god worshipped by an army of Persians that the Greeks defeated.

== Legacy ==
Khamenei Zahak is a derogatory term used to nickname Ayatollah Ali Khamenei, the Supreme Leader of Iran. It was a main anti Iranian regime chant during 2019-2022 protests of Iranian women where thousands were imprisoned. Sepideh Qolian was put on a trial after crying "Khamenei Zahak we will take you in under the ground". In the 2026 Iran war, Mojtaba Khamenei called the United States and Israel "Zahhak-like aggressors" for attacking Iran.

== Other dragons in Iranian tradition ==
Besides Aži Dahāka, several other dragons and dragon-like creatures are mentioned in Zoroastrian scripture:

- Aži Sruvara – the 'horned dragon'
- Aži Zairita – the 'yellow dragon,' that is killed by the hero Kərəsāspa, Middle Persian Kirsāsp. (Yasna 9.1, 9.30; Yasht 19.19)
- Aži Raoiδita – the 'red dragon' conceived by Angra Mainyu's to bring about the 'daeva-induced winter' that is the reaction to Ahura Mazda's creation of the Airyanem Vaejah. (Vendidad 1.2)
- Aži Višāpa – the 'dragon of poisonous slaver' that consumes offerings to Aban if they are made between sunset and sunrise (Nirangistan 48).
- Gandarəβa – the 'yellow-heeled' monster of the sea 'Vourukasha' that can swallow twelve provinces at once. On emerging to destroy the entire creation of Asha, it too is slain by the hero Kərəsāspa. (Yasht 5.38, 15.28, 19.41)

== The Aži/Ahi in Indo-Iranian tradition ==
Stories of monstrous serpents who are killed or imprisoned by heroes or divine beings may date back to prehistory and are found in the myths of many Indo-European peoples, including those of the Indo-Iranians, that is, the common ancestors of both the Iranians and Vedic Indians.

The most obvious point of comparison is that in Vedic Sanskrit ahi is a cognate of Avestan aži. However, In Vedic tradition, the only dragon of importance is Vrtra, but "there is no Iranian tradition of a dragon such as Indian Vrtra" (Boyce, 1975:91-92). Moreover, while Iranian tradition has numerous dragons, all of which are malevolent, Vedic tradition has only one other dragon besides Vṛtra - ahi budhnya, the benevolent "dragon of the deep". In the Vedas, gods battle dragons, but in Iranian tradition, this is a function of mortal heroes.

Thus, although it seems clear that dragon-slaying heroes (and gods in the case of the Vedas) "were a part of Indo-Iranian tradition and folklore, it is also apparent that Iran and India developed distinct myths early." (Skjaervø, 1989:192)

== Adaptations ==
- Persians and I
- The Last Fiction
- The Legend of Mardoush

== See also ==
- Azhdahak (Armenian mythical being), identified as Astyages
- Snakes in mythology

== Bibliography ==
- Boyce, Mary (1975). History of Zoroastrianism, Vol. I. Leiden: Brill.
- Ingersoll, Ernest, et al., (2013). The Illustrated Book of Dragons and Dragon Lore. Chiang Mai: Cognoscenti Books. ASIN B00D959PJ0
- Skjærvø, P. O (1989). "Aždahā: in Old and Middle Iranian". Encyclopedia Iranica. Vol. 3. New York: Routledge & Kegan Paul. pp. 191–199.
- Khaleghi-Motlagh, DJ (1989). "Aždahā: in Persian Literature". Encyclopedia Iranica. Vol. 3. New York: Routledge & Kegan Paul. pp. 199–203.
- Omidsalar, M (1989). "Aždahā: in Iranian Folktales". Encyclopedia Iranica. Vol. 3. New York: Routledge & Kegan Paul. pp. 203–204.
- Russell, J. R (1989). "Aždahā: Armenian Aždahak". Encyclopedia Iranica. Vol. 3. New York: Routledge & Kegan Paul. pp. 204–205.

Preceded by Jamshid	Legendary Kings of the Shāhnāma; 800–1800 (after Keyumars)	Succeeded by Fereydun
