= Abtin =

Character in Shahnama

Abtin (Persian: آبتین), or Athwya, is a character in Shahnama (national epic of Iran), who is the father of Fereydun. He is mentioned as the father of Fereydun in the Avesta, having been the "second man" to prepare Ahura-Mazda for the "corporeal world" (the first being Jamshid, and the third being Thrita). His name comes from the same origin as "Āptya", a title for water-born deities or heroes in the Rigveda. According to the Shatapatha Brahmana, that the first to bear this title was Agni, and that he subsequently created three Aptyas, Trita, Dvita, and Ekata, when he spat on the waters in anger.
