= Fereydun =

Iranian mythical king and hero from the Pishdadian dynasty

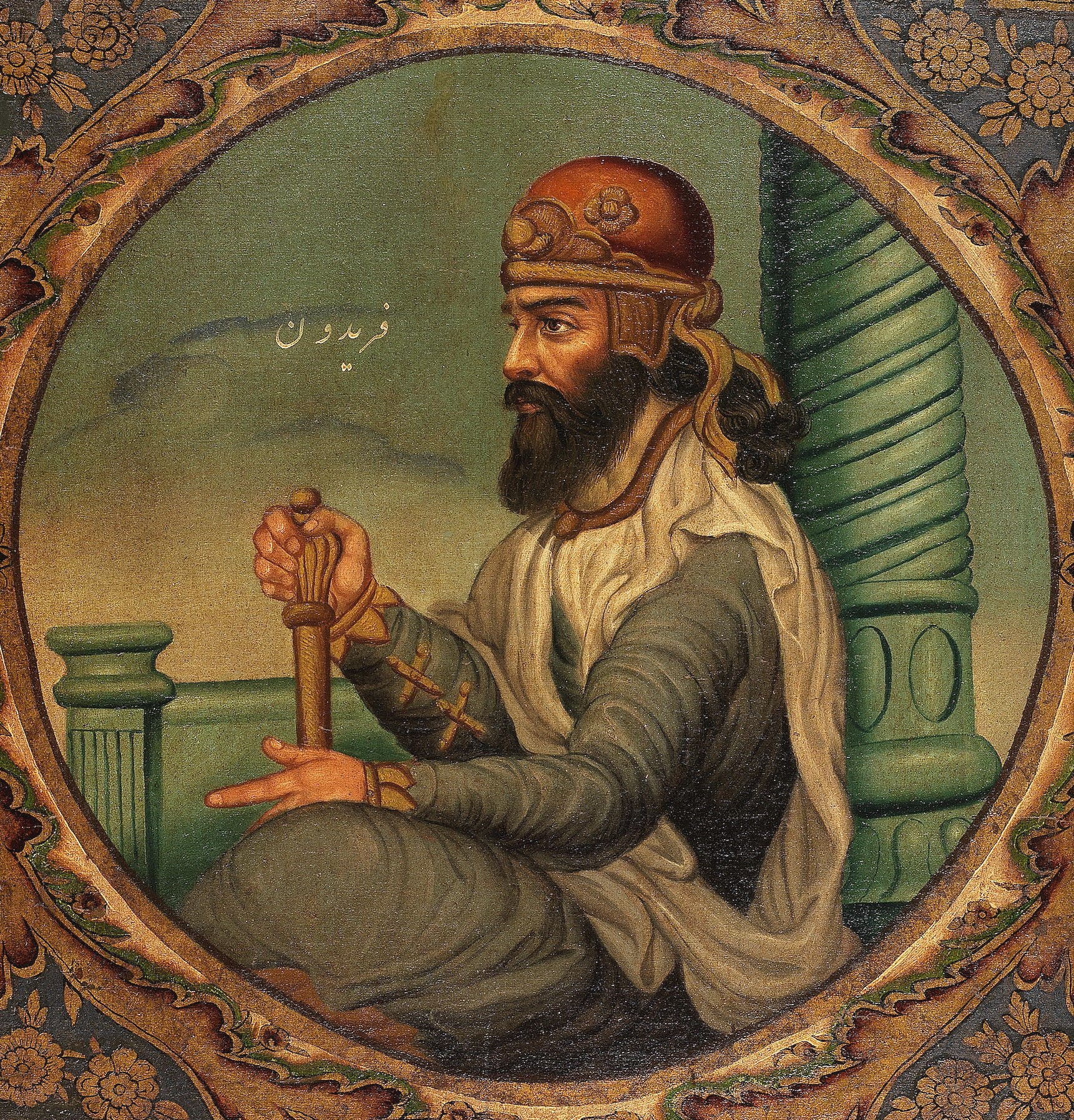
- Oil painting of Fereydun. Made in Qajar Iran during the mid-19th-century

In-universe information
- Title: King of the Pishdadian dynasty
- Spouses: Arnavaz; Shahrnaz
- Children: Salm; Tur; Iraj
- Relatives: Abtin (father); Faranak (mother)

Fereydun (Avestan: 𐬚𐬭𐬀𐬉𐬙𐬀𐬊𐬥𐬀 (θraētaona), Middle Persian: 𐭯𐭫𐭩𐭲𐭥𐭭 (plytʿn), Persian: فریدون (fereydun)) is a hero and king in Iranian mythology. Although the details vary, his portrayal is broadly similar in the Zoroastrian sacred book Avesta, Middle Persian texts, and the 11th century Persian national epic Shahnameh. In all his versions, he is both a warrior and physician that defeats Azhi Dahaka/Zahhak. While the Avesta says that Fereydun killed him, later stories say that he had him chained in a cave at the top of Mount Damavand.

== Name and etymology ==
According to the Austrian linguist Manfred Mayrhofer, Fereydun's Avestan name Thraētaona means "having triple power", being a combination of thraē ("three") and taona-, itself derived from tav- ("to be able" or "power"). Fereydun is known in other languages as follows; Middle Persian: Frēdōn, New Persian: Fereydūn/Farīdūn and the Arabicized form Afrīdūn.

== Mythology ==
=== In the Avesta ===
In the Zoroastrian sacred book Avesta, Fereydun is given the epithet "Athbiiani", meaning "of the house of Athbiia", which was the name of his father. Fereydun's birthplace was Varena, which later records associate with Var, a village situated within the Larijan District. He was both a warrior and a physician. Seeking to defeat Azhi Dahaka, "the three-headed, the three-mouthed and the six-eyed" dragon of a "thousand senses", Thraetaona asks the water goddess Anahita for a blessing. Azhi Dahaka was "the most powerful, fiendish Druj [the lie], that demon, baleful to the world, the strongest Druj that Angra Mainyu [evil spirit] created against the material world, to destroy the world of good principle." Inside a citadel within the Bawri region (sometimes associated with Babylon), Azhi Dahaka also venerated Anahita. Fereydun ultimately defeats and kills Azhi Dahaka, which is considered his greatest achievement in the Avesta.

As early as in the Avesta, Fereydun is credited with supernatural abilities, including being able to transform his own body as well as the appearance of others. According to stanzas 61 and 62 of the Aban Yasht, Paurva, a talented helmsman who was lost at sea and looking for his home, was turned into a vulture by Fereydun. This lasted for three days until he was returned to land by Anahita. According to the Iranian historian Ahmad Tafazzoli, "This report may be an allusion to a steersman whose boat is buffeted by winds."

In the Aogǝmadaēčā, Fereydun is described as being able to dispel magical and demonic spells. He also had healing abilities, such as being able to treat scabies, fever, constipation, chills, impotence, and wounds inflicted by dragons.

=== In later Middle Persian texts ===
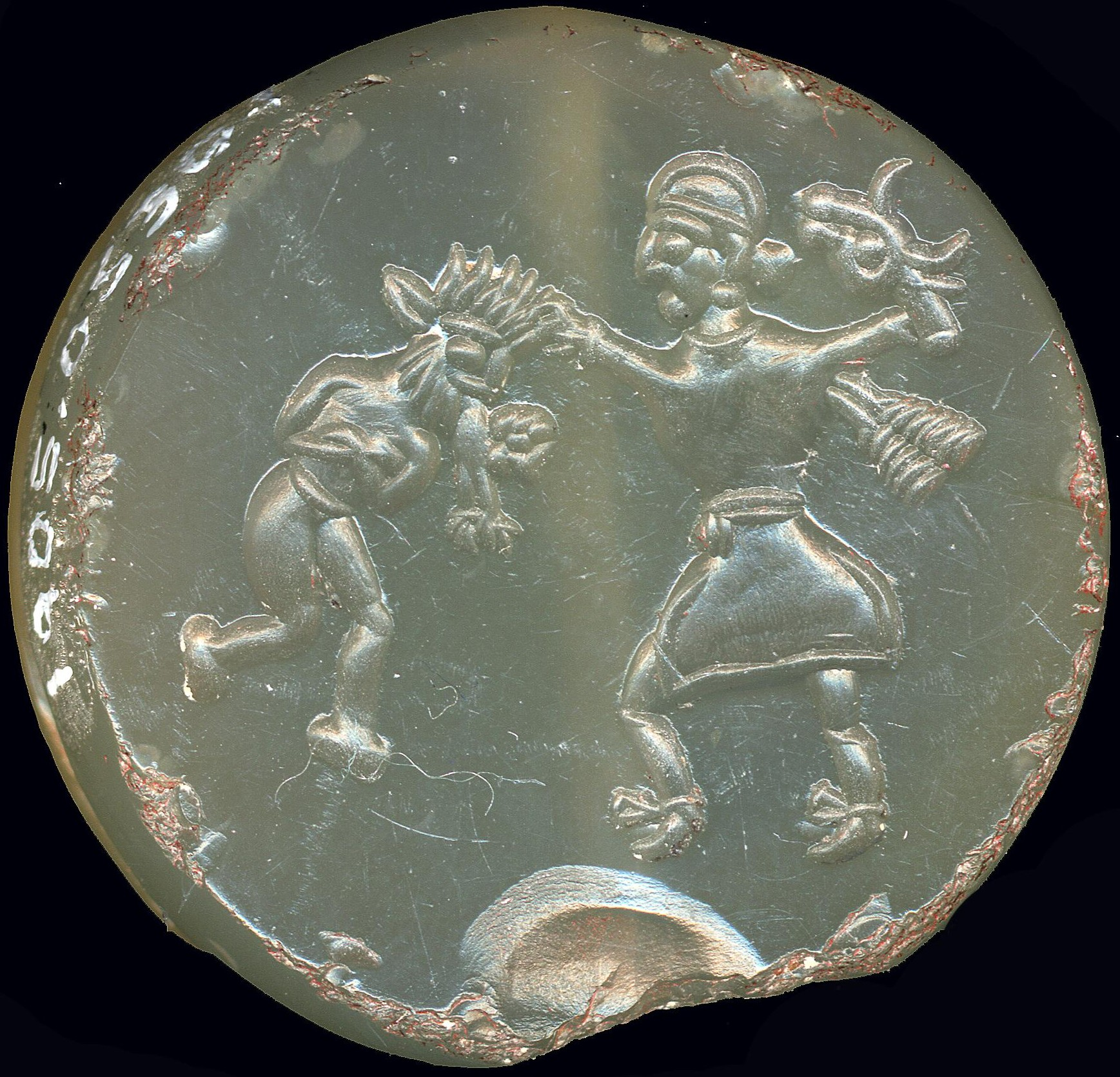
A Sasanian amulet depicting a hero holding a bull-headed mace and subduing a demon, possibly meant to represent Fereydun's battle with Azi Dahak.

In the Bundahishn and other later Middle Persian texts, Fereydun is the son of Purtora the Aspiyan and a descendant of Yima (Jamshid). In this narrative, Fereydun also defeats the dragon Azi Dahak, thus avenging Yima. Ahura Mazda stops him from killing Azi Dahak to prevent the earth from becoming full of "noxious creatures" emerging from his corpse. Instead Fereydun has Azi Dahak put in chains and imprisoned in a cave at the top of Mount Damavand in northern Iran. Until the final days of the earth, Azi Dahak is destined to remain there when Garshasp ultimately kills him. According to Tafazzoli, this version "seems to be a late Zoroastrian scholastic elaboration of the original Avestan myth." Because of his victory, Fereydun is commonly referred to by the epithets purr-pērōzgar ("very victorious"), tagīg ("valiant") and zōrīg ("powerful").

Fereydun ruled for 500 years, being the last king to rule over an undivided world. He eventually distributed his lands among his sons: the youngest son Eriz/Eraj (Iraj) received the most important part, Iran: the eldest son Sarm/Salm (Salm) received the western part, Rome: Toz/Tur (Tur) received the eastern part, Turan. The Iranian-American historian M. Rahim Shayegan suggests this version of the story may have been collected under the Sasanian Empire (224–651) as part of their coordinated effort to gather legendary and epic tales about Iran.

Iraj was murdered by his two brothers following a dispute between them. They also murdered Iraj's two sons, but his daughter survived as she was hidden by Fereydun. After giving birth to a girl, she is soon killed. Fereydun takes charge of raising the girl, and ten generations later, a prince descended from this lineage named Manushchihr (Manuchehr) is born. He ultimately kills both Salm and Tur in order to avenge the killing of Iraj.

Fereydun was able to turn himself into a dragon, turn demons into stone, and shoot hailstones from his right nostril and room-sized burning rocks from the other. He also had healing abilities.

=== In the Shahnameh ===
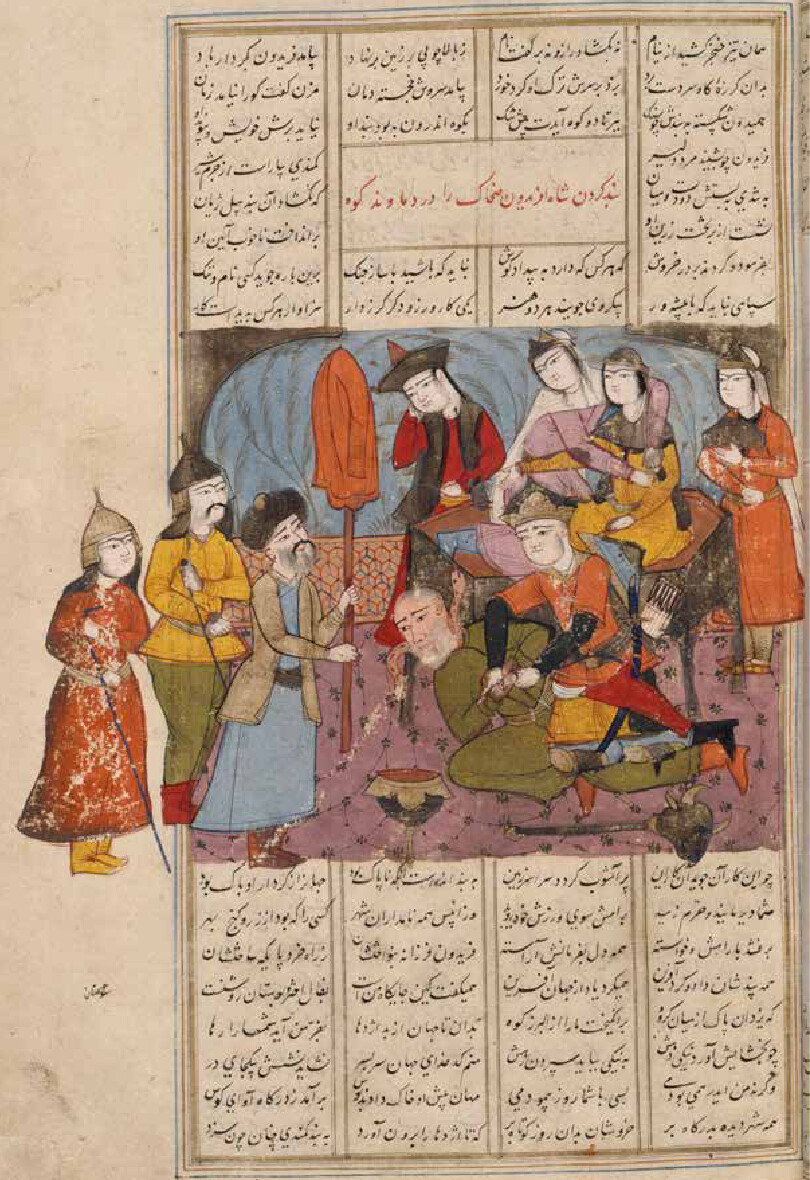
Zahhak bound by Fereydun, while Kaveh the Blacksmith is holding an apron-banner. From a mid-17th-century Safavid miniature.

In the 11th century Persian national epic Shahnameh, Fereydun's father is Abtin, a descendant of the Pishdadian ruler Jamshid, and his mother is Faranak.

In this narrative, Azhi Dahaka/Azi Dahak is known as Zahhak, and is the son of a benevolent Arab king, whom he eventually kills under the encouragement of the devil. He subsequently gains two serpents on his shoulders, which he feeds the brains of young men daily. He eventually kills Jamshid and seizes his realm, ruling as an oppressive king for 1,000 years. One day Abtin is also killed by Zahhak, which leads Faranak to take Fereydun to a farm to hide there. A cow named Barmaye provides milk that keeps Fereydun alive. Once Fereydun turns three years old, his mother takes him to the Alborz Mountains in northern Iran, where he stays concealed until he turns sixteen years old.

Due to the brutality and oppression of Zahhak, a rebellion erupts under the leadership of Kaveh the Blacksmith. The latter finds Fereydun in his hiding place. Fereydun joins the rebellion, and ultimately defeats Zahhak, and has him chained in a cave at the top of Mount Damavand in northern Iran. Jamshid's sisters Arnavaz and Shahrnaz, who had been held captive by Zahhak, are then freed by Fereydun, who marries them both.

Kaveh's banner of rebellion was his own leather apron wrapped around a wooden spear, which Fereydun had decorated with gems, gold and brocade and tassels of red, yellow (or blue), and violet. The banner became the imperial standard of pre-Islamic Iran, and became known as the Derafsh Kaviani, meaning "Standard of the Kay(s)" (Kings), or "Standard of Kaveh".

Fereydun ruled for 500 years, eventually distributing his lands among his sons: the third son Sarm/Salm (Salm) received the western part, Rome: the second son Toz/Tur (Tur) received the eastern part, Turan: and the first son Iraj received the middle part, Iran. Jealous of Iraj, the two brothers end up murdering him. Iraj's wife Mahafarid had recently given birth to a daughter, whom Fereydun raises like his own child. The daughter later has a son named Manuchehr, who ends up avenging Iraj by defeating and killing Salm and Tur. Fereydun subsequently installs Manuchehr on the throne, and dies soon afterwards. Nevertheless, Iran (named after Iraj) and Turan (named after Tur) continue to wage war against each other for many generations, making up the core theme of the Shahnameh.

=== Medicine ===
Fereydun In the Islamic period, Fereydun was credited as the inventor of medicine, while the Denkard grants him the epithet purr-bēšaz, "Very-Healing", he was also regarded as the inventor of amulets.

=== Size ===
According to Al-Maqrizi, Fereydun was "nine spear lengths" tall, with each spear length being three fathoms, thus making him 167 feet tall, while his chest was four spear lengths in width, or 72 feet.

== Legacy and assessment ==
According to Abolala Soudavar, Fereydun is partially a reflection of Cyrus the Great (r. 550 – 530 BC), the first Achaemenid King of Kings.

== Sources ==
- Canepa, Matthew P. (2009). The Two Eyes of the Earth: Art and Ritual of Kingship Between Rome and Sasanian Iran. University of California Press. ISBN 978-0520257276.
- Khaleghi-Motlagh, Djalal (1994). "Derafš-e Kāvīān". In Yarshater, Ehsan (ed.). Encyclopædia Iranica (Online ed.). Encyclopædia Iranica Foundation. ISBN 978-1568590264.
- Kia, Mehrdad (2016). The Persian Empire: A Historical Encyclopedia [2 volumes]. ABC-CLIO. ISBN 978-1610693912.
- Lewental, D. Gershon (2024). "Symbol of (Iranian) Empire: The Sāsānian Imperial Standard (Derafsh-e kāviyān) from Arab-Islamic Conquest Narratives to Modern Nationalist Myths". History & Memory. 36 (2). Indiana University Press: 5–38. doi:10.2979/ham.00008.
- Mayrhofer, Manfred (1979). Iranisches Personennamenbuch. Band I (in German). Austrian Academy of Sciences. ISBN 978-3700103004.
- Namiranian, Katayoon (2025). "Fereydun, the Mythical Warrior Who Was a Doctor". Journal of Research on History of Medicine. 14 (4): 291–304. doi:10.30476/rhm.2024.104249.1245.
- Soudavar, Abolala (2012). "Astyages, Cyrus and Zoroaster: Solving a historical dilemma". Iran. 50: 45–78. doi:10.1080/05786967.2012.11834712. JSTOR 24595838. S2CID 194229337. (registration required)
- Shayegan, M. Rahim (2017). "Sasanian political ideology". In Potts, Daniel T. (ed.). The Oxford Handbook of Ancient Iran. Oxford University Press. pp. 805–813. ISBN 978-0190668662.
- Tafazzoli, Ahmad (1999). "Ferēdūn". In Yarshater, Ehsan (ed.). Encyclopædia Iranica. Vol. IX/5: Fauna III–Festivals VIII. London and New York: Routledge & Kegan Paul. pp. 531–533. ISBN 978-0-933273-33-7.

Preceded by Zahhak	Legendary Kings of the Shahnameh; 1800–2300 (after Keyumars)	Succeeded by Manuchehr
