= Legendary progenitor =

Legendary figure held as a common ancestor of a dynasty or ethnic group

A legendary progenitor is a legendary or mythological figure held to be the common ancestor of a dynasty, people, tribe or ethnic group.

== Overview ==
Masculinity, femininity and "ghenos" or lineage linked to legendary progenitors were fundamental concepts of family identity in the Etruscan and Ancient Greek eras. The Greeks demonstrated the principles of family functionality in the mythological lives of Zeus, Hera, Hestia and Hermes. These included communal dining, and "charis" a form of charity that Vittoro Cigoli and Eugena Scabini described as being "deployed to oppose the core of violence inherent in the family relationship". Etrusco-Roman culture, developed from the Greek where each "gens" (family or house) had their own deified hero, prince or demi-god along with various household deities. The expansion of family trees to include heroic or legendary ancestors was used to boost social status and amass personal finances. Rome's patriarchal families, along with later European dynasties engaged in power struggles, such as that to be elected Pope based on this change in family culture.

Peoples from all over the world have supposed themselves descended from various different eponymic or mythical progenitors. The Italians claimed ancestry from Italus, Lydians from Lydus, Phoenicians associated with Phoenix, Sicilians legendary progenitor was Siculus, Pelasgians revered Pelasgus, Dorians traced lineage to Dorus, Aeolians were linked to Aeolus and Hellenes looked up to Hellen. Legendary progenitors also gave their names to places, Memphis was alleged to have been built by Menes and Ninevah by Ninus.

In later times, place names in Britain were given the names of legendary chieftains or Anglo-Saxon Kings. Isaac Taylor (1787–1865) suggested that "minute fragments of historic truth have been conserved". He noted however that the "greatest caution must be exercised as to the conclusions which we allow ourselves to draw. The traditions are generally vague and obscure and the personages whose names are associated with these sites have often only a mythical, or, to speak technically, an eponymic existence."

== Europe ==
In Armenian mythology, Hayk the Great or The Great Hayk, also known as Hayk Nahapet, is the legendary patriarch and founder of the Armenian nation. His story is told in the History of Armenia attributed to the Armenian historian Moses of Chorene (AD 410 to 490).

In various Greek myths, Melampus is the legendary progenitor of a great, long line of seers. Along with his brother Bias, they became kings of territory in the Argeian and was acknowledged as a leader in Homer's Odyssey. His grandson is recorded as the prophet Theoklymenos.

Niccolò Machiavelli discussed how in Ancient Rome, Aeneas the Trojan and Romulus were alternately said to have been the city's legendary founders. He considered how one's view of history could be influenced by the preference of one progenitor over another, saying, "if whoever examines the building of Rome takes Aeneas for its first progenitor [primo progenitore], it will be of those cities built by foreigners, while if he takes Romulus it will be of those built by men native to the place". Machiavelli does not take a preference and suggests Rome had "a free beginning, without depending on anyone".

In his Germania, Tacitus asserted that the Germani (not their original name according to Tacitus) celebrated 'an earth-born god, Tuisco, and his son Mannus, as the origin of their race, as their founders. To Mannus they assign three sons, from whose names, they say, the coast tribes are called Ingaevones; those of the interior, Herminones; all the rest, Istaevones.' Varying manuscripts of the early medieval Frankish Table of Nations claim that thirteen Germanic tribes were descended from three brothers: Erminus, Inguo, and Istio. The names of these three brothers are evidently derived from the tribal names mentioned by Tacitus in the Germania (where the brothers go unnamed): Erminus from Herminones, Inguo from Ingaevones, and Istio from Istaevones. Most variations of the Table do not mention their father's name, but two manuscripts precede the Table by mentioning Analeus or Allanius as "the first king of the Romans", two others name "Mulius" as the three brothers' father, while the Historia Brittonum calls their father "Alanus".

Míl Espáine is recorded in Christian writings to be the legendary progenitor of the Gaels or Goidels of Ireland. He was suggested to have led the Milesians to be the final inhabitants of Ireland.

The five ancestors of Mieszko I as well as Chościsko, the father of Piast the Wheelwright have all been suggested as legendary progenitors of the Piast dynasty in Poland.

== Asia ==
Abraham (originally Abram) is regarded as the patriarch of the Arabian tribes, especially the Adnanite tribes and Twelve Tribes of Israel in the Bible and the Quran. In the Book of Genesis, he is blessed with this honour by God, saying "Your name will be Abraham, for I have made you a father of many nations".

Tan'Gun is the legendary forebear of the Korean people.

In Indian Hinduism, the Rishis regarded Manu and Saptarshis as the legendary ancestor of the Indian people in the scriptures. This tradition was carried forward in the Brahamanas, Puranas, Matsya Purana, Vishnu Purana and Aitareya Brahama. Brahma is also mentioned as the progenitor of Manu.

Nyatri Tsenpo was a legendary progenitor of the so-called "Yarlung dynasty" of kings in Tibet. Tsenpo, or "gNya'-khri btsan-po" has been suggested to have descended from an Indian dynasty and hence linked with Buddha. In Tibet, the term is also connected with a spiritual progenitor. Tibetan Buddhists believe their ancestors to be famous teachers or translators. They consider that single spiritual progenitors can incarnate in various different people simultaneously in different geographical locations. These progenitors are given names based on their qualities and physical locations. Examples include "Prince Lion the teacher of Rgya" and "Karma, Light of Knowledge and Love the Mkhyen-brtse at Dpal-spuns".

In Chinese mythology, the goddess Nüwa is a legendary progenitor of all human beings. She also creates a magic stone. Her husband Fu Xi is suggested to be the progenitor of divination and the patron saint of numbers.

In Bali, a legendary forefather or "stamvader" was called Wau Rauh. He was a mythical Brahmin high priest of Majapahit who established a five caste system. He had five wives and five children and founded Brahamanic clans such as Kamenuh, Nauba, Gelgel, Kayusunia and Andapan.

Prince Vijaya has been discussed as a legendary primogenitor of the Sinhalese people of Sri Lanka. He is recorded in the Sri Lankan Pali chronicles as the first king and described going on a mythical quest. Monarchs continued to reign in the Kingdom of Kandy until being deposed by the British under the terms of the Kandyan Convention.

== Americas ==
Mythical progenitors are honoured in songs, dance and instrumental performance by the Mbyá people in Argentina. Their songs invoke the names of various deities which are believed to reincarnate as souls in new children. Their multitude of legendary progenitors are considered to "dictate actions carried out by their children on earth".

Patrick Wolfe has discussed the work of Scottish ethnologist John Ferguson McLennan in his study The Worship of Animals and Plants (1869, 1870) regarding the role of legendary progenitors in Totemism, practised by Native Americans. He suggested that "patrilineal totem stocks were endowed with fictional ancestral figures who were well suited to provide a basis from which subsequent and more sublime theologies might develop".

== Africa ==
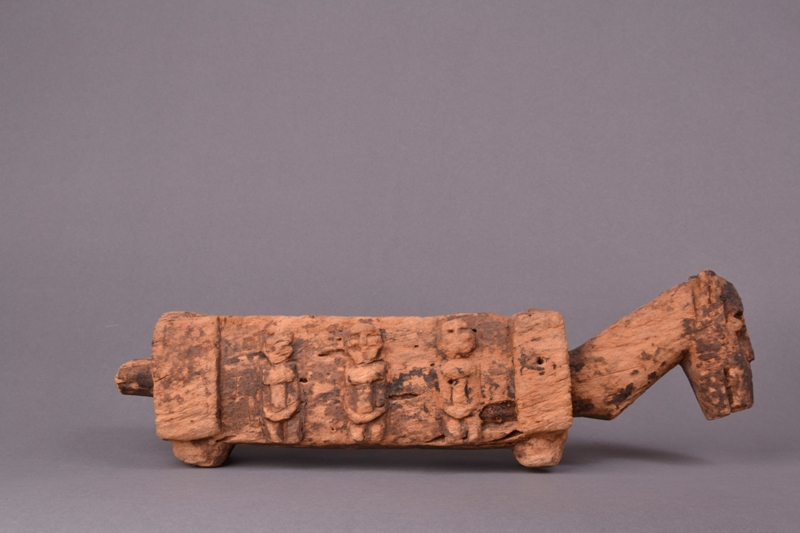
The "Ark of the world", in which Nommo, the mythical progenitor of humanity, is supposed to have come down from the sky

David Conrad discusses how ancient Mali's ruling elite adopted composite characters of Islamic forebears into legendary progenitors. Such a composite image is discussed as a character called Fosana, whose legends are told as "a collage of loosely connected incidents from the Prophet's life and times". Fragments of the stories of Fosana have been connected with events in the lives of Bilal ibn Rabah al-Habashi and Suraqa bin Malik.

== Australia ==
In Arnhem Land in Australia, the Kunwinjku people consider Wurugag and Waramurungundi to be their original ancestors and have depicted them in their tribal art.

Robert Alun Jones discussed Baldwin Spencer's study of the Alcheringa ancestors of the Arunta tribe in Australia as having both a spirit "ulthana" and a syzygy spirit "arumburinga". The syzygy spirit reincarnating repetitively as a reflection of the spirit of a single alcheringa ancestor.

== Primogenitors ==
In creation myths, the first man and woman extend the concept to all of mankind.

== See also ==
- Euhemerism
- Mitochondrial Eve

== Bibliography ==
- Goffart, Walter (1983). "The Supposedly 'Frankish' Table of Nations: An Edition and Study". Frühmittelalterliche Studien. 17 (1): 98–130. doi:10.1515/9783110242164.98. S2CID 201734002. [Reprinted in Rome's Fall and After (Hambledon, 1989), pp. 133–166.]
