= Hawaiʻiloa =

Legendary Hawaiian figure

Hawaiʻiloa (alt. Hawaiʻi Loa or Ke Kowa i Hawaiʻi) is a mythical Hawaiian fisherman and navigator who is said to have discovered the island of Hawaiʻi. It is also the name of a notable voyaging canoe.

== Legend ==
Hawaiʻiloa was an expert fisherman and navigator who was famous for his lengthy fishing expeditions. While on a prolonged voyage, his principal navigator, Makaliʻi, asked Hawaiʻiloa to steer eastward towards Aldebaran (Hokuʻula, meaning "red star") and the Pleiades (near the Cluster of Makaliʻi). After sailing in this direction, he and his crew stumbled upon the island of Hawaiʻi, which was named in Hawaiʻiloa's honor. Hawaiʻiloa returned to his homeland, Ka ʻāina kai melemele a Kāne ("the land of the yellow sea of Kāne"), to bring his family back with him to Hawaiʻi. He then organized a colonizing expedition with his family and eight other skilled navigators. They settled on what is now the Island of Hawaiʻi, named in his honor.

The legend contains reference to his children: Māui (his eldest son), Kauaʻi (son), and Oʻahu (daughter) who settled on the islands that bear their names.

=== Historical accuracy ===
The Hawaiʻiloa legend is popular amongst Hawaiians as a realistic Hawaiian origin story that is consistent with modern anthropological and historical beliefs.

However, there is currently little evidence to support its historical accuracy. The story is attested only by 19th-century sources such as Abraham Fornander and Thomas George Thrum, neither of whom provided their sources.

Hawaiʻiloa is also unmentioned by earlier Hawaiian historians such as David Malo. Malo chronicled many Hawaiian origin stories, migration tales, and legends of indigenous origin. Samuel Kamakau tells of an alternate legend that the first man (Kumu-Honua) and woman (Lalo-Honua) were created on Oʻahu.

It is considered by many Hawaiian LDS locals that Hawai'iloa is the same as a Book of Mormon character named Hagoth.

== Canoe ==
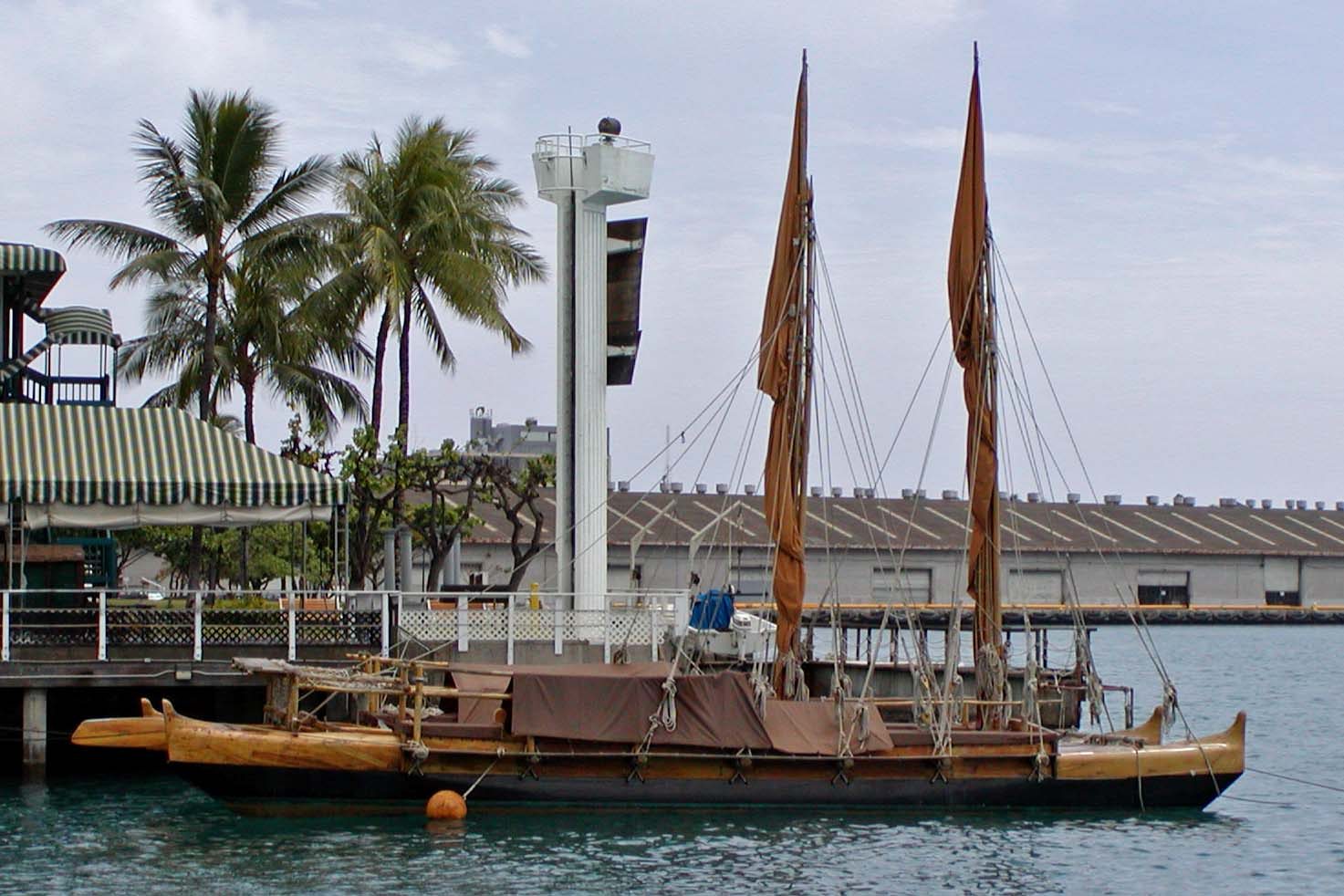
Hawaiʻiloa, Honolulu Harbor

Hawaiʻiloa is also the name of a voyaging canoe, built between 1991 and 1994. Named after the legendary navigator, the canoe was built for ocean navigation and has sailed internationally. The canoe Hawaiʻiloa is now docked at Honolulu Harbor. It is often sailed on long voyages throughout the Pacific Ocean, studying voyaging techniques used in Ancient Hawaii. The canoe was designed by project director Nainoa Thompson, Wally Froiseth, and master canoe carver (kahuna kalai- wa'a) Wrighto Bowman Jr. (the son of Wright Elemakule Bowman Sr.).

=== Building ===
To make the canoe, two Sitka spruce logs were brought to Hawaiʻi from Southeast Alaska, donated by the SeAlaska Corporation (owned by the Tlingit, Haida, and Tshimshian tribes). These came from 400-year-old, 200 feet high trees, a size which could not be found in modern Hawaiʻi. The hulls of the canoe were designed by Rudy and Barry Choy and Dick Rhodes, and also used numerous woods from more local sources. The canoe was made without metal parts, and used three miles of lashing.

Hawaiʻiloa is 57 feet (17 m) long, with a beam of 19 feet (5.8 m). She has two sails, each of 240–420 square feet (22–39 m^{2}). She was initially launched in July 1993, and subsequently modified in dry dock before being re-launched a year later.

=== Voyages in 1995 ===
In 1995, Hawaiʻiloa sailed her maiden voyage to Tahiti, Raʻiatea, and Nuku Hiva in the Marquesas Islands in company with Hōkūleʻa and a third canoe from Hawaiʻi called Makaliʻi together with two canoes from Rarotonga: Te ʻAu Tonga and Takitumu, and the canoe Te ʻAurere, from New Zealand. Subsequently that year, Hawaiʻiloa was shipped to Seattle and then sailed north to Alaska, visiting twenty native villages on the coastal journey between Vancouver and Juneau.

== See also ==
- Hawaiki
- Hawaiian religion
- Hōkūleʻa
- Polynesian navigation
- Polynesian Voyaging Society
