= Thần Trụ Trời =

Vietnamese mythical figure

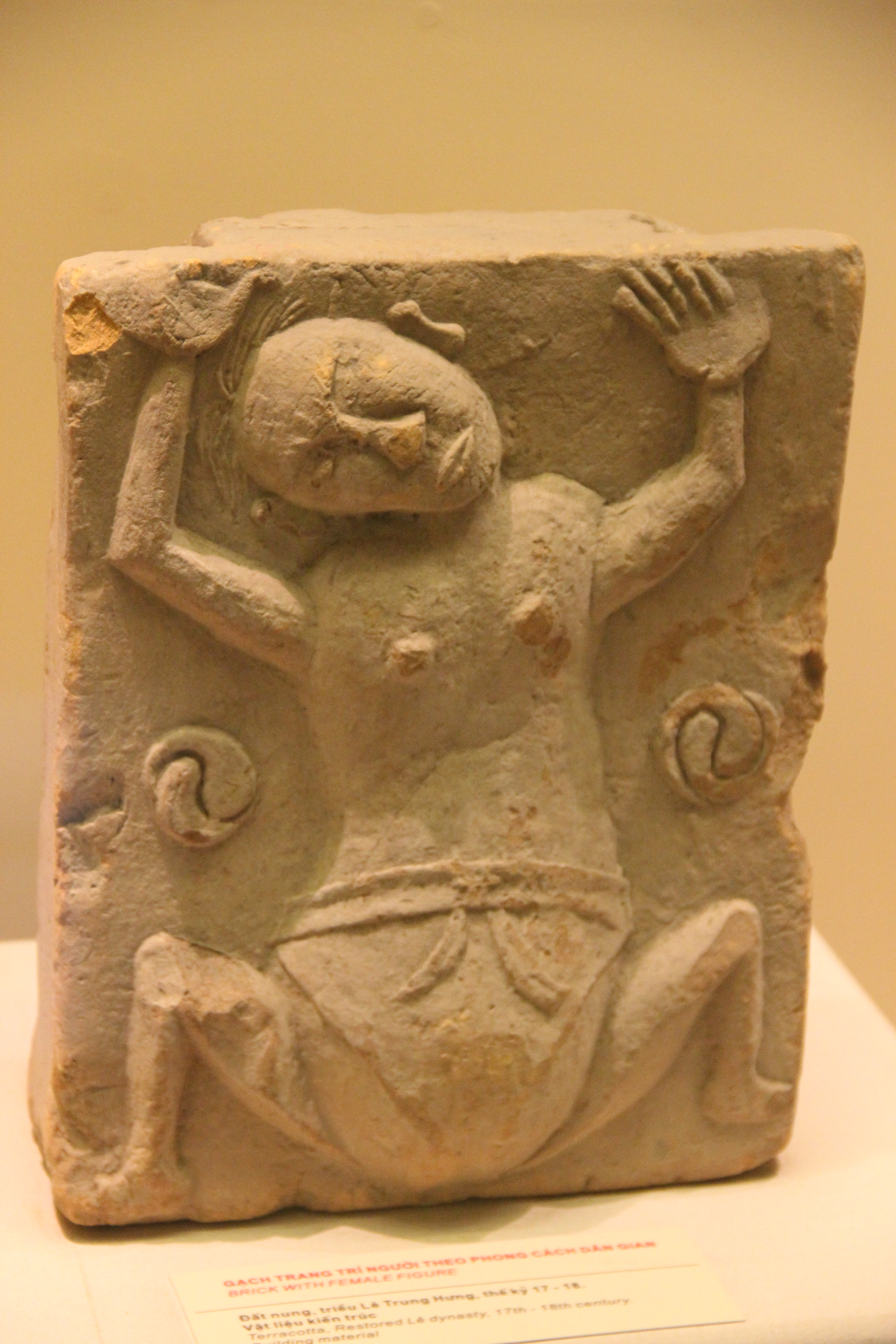
- Terracotta brick (17th–18th centuries) depicting a colossal creator deity in the act of creating the world, with yin-yang spirals on either side representing the primordial cosmos.
- Other names: Ông Trụ Trời, Khổng Lồ
- Vietnamese: 神柱𡗶, 翁柱𡗶, 孔路

Genealogy
- Parents: None; self-generated
- Siblings: None
- Consort: None
- Children: None

Thần Trụ Trời (Chữ Nôm: 神柱𡗶) or Ông Trụ Trời (翁柱𡗶, lit. "Pillar of Heaven"), with some versions calling him Khổng Lồ (孔路, lit. "The Giant"), is the first god in some traditions of Vietnamese mythology, being the one who created the world by building pillars to separate heaven and earth.

== Mythology ==
At that time, there were no creatures on earth. Heaven and earth are merely a chaotic, dark area. Suddenly appeared a giant god, extremely tall and indescribably long legs. Every step he takes is ice from one area to another, from one mountain to another.

One day, the god stretched out his shoulders and stood up, raising his head to the sky. The god dug the earth, carried the stone, and built it into a large and tall pillar to support the sky. As high as the pillar is raised, the sky is like a vast curtain that is gradually raised. He alone dug, built, the stone pillars kept getting higher and higher and pushed the dome of the sky up to the blue clouds.

Since then, heaven and earth have split into two. The earth is flat like a square tray, the sky is round like an upside down bowl, where sky and earth meet is the horizon. When the sky was high and dry, the god of sky broke the pillar and threw the earth everywhere. Every stone that was thrown turned into a mountain or an island, and the earth scattered everywhere into mounds, piles, and high hills. Therefore, the ground today is no longer flat, but has concave and convex areas. the place where god dug deep to get soil and stone to build columns, today is the immense sea.

The pillar of sky is now gone. It is said that traces of that column are in Thạch Môn mountain (or An Phụ mountain ), Hải Dương region. That mountain is also known as Kình Thiên Trụ, which means Cột Chống Trời (Sky-Supporting Pillar).

After the god Thần Trụ Trời divided heaven and earth, there were other gods who continued the work of building this world. There are many such gods, such as Thần Sao (Star God), Thần Sông (River God), Thần Núi (Mountain God), Thần Biển (Sea God)... and other giant gods. Therefore, there is a folk song that is still handed down to this day:

"Ông đếm cát

Ông tát bể (biển)

Ông kể sao

Ông đào sông

Ông trồng cây

Ông xây rú

Ông trụ trời..."

=== Another version ===
Some other versions call this god Khổng Lồ and some more details. This version says that:

Long ago Sky and Earth were all mixed together in a general chaos and darkness. A giant, Khổng Lồ, somehow appeared At first the giant was creation itself, his breath the wind, his voice the thunder. Then he raised the sky from the earth by pushing up with his head and he maintained the separation by building a huge pillar that went up from the earth and tumed the sky into a great ceiling- bowl. Later, he pulled down the pillar. broke it up, and flung it all about. The pieces of pillar became familiar landscape elements. The ditches left by the giant's digging for pillar material became waterways. A giant turtle's breathing caused the tides. When a giant female figure came into being, the creator giant fell in love with her, but the female resisted him and was the larger and stronger of the two. Before she would agree to marry her suitor, she challenged him to several contests and always won. It was in the course of these frequently earth changing contests that much of the world as we know it-mountains, rivers, and so forth-were formed. Finally, the giantess accepted the giant and they were married. On the way to the wedding ceremony, the giant stretched his phallus across a river to serve as a bridge for his companions, When one of the friends dropped hot ashes on the penis, the giant jumped, and half of the men fell into the water, only to be rescued by the giantess, who hid them under her dress to dry.

== See also ==
- Cosmic Man
- Gaia
- Kingu
- Pangu
- Ymir, a primeval giant whose body parts were also used to create the world in the Norse creation myth
- Manu
- Panguite, meteoritic mineral named after Pangu, discovered in 2012
- Protoplast (religion)
- Purusha
- Tlaltecuhtli
