= Cosmic Man =

Archetype in Jungian theory

In Jungian theory, the Cosmic Man is an archetypal figure that appears in creation myths of a wide variety of mythology. Generally, he is described as helpful or positive, and serves as a seed for the creation of the world. After death, parts of his body became physical parts of the universe. He also represents the oneness of human existence, or the universe.

Cosmic Man is a symbol of Self in the Jungian archetypes and is part of the goal of individuation for the individual and the collective. The process of individuation in cosmic man is often part of creation but can take place after death. The Cosmic Man archetype combines masculine and feminine or Anima and Animus and thus can be viewed as hermaphroditic or bisexual. Physical features include a primordial cosmic giant that goes through the process of individuation. The process can include dismemberment, plant or animal qualities, and a quaternary structure. Cosmic Man contains aspects of an archaic identity. Ideas and emotional values are part of a collective unconscious agreement, creating a primordial bond between elements, plants, animals, and humans.

== Examples ==
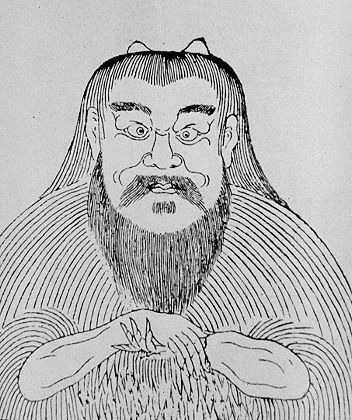
Found in China, Pangu is an example of Cosmic Man.

In Aztec mythology, Tlaltecuhtli's fragmented body served as the foundation for the world in the Aztec creation myth of the fifth and final era.

In Chinese legend, Pangu is thought to have given the natural features of the Earth their form, and when he died his body became the Sacred Mountains of China.

In Egyptian mythology, Atum is the first god who emerged from the primordial waters of Nun and created the world by giving birth to the gods Shu and Tefnut.

In Japanese mythology, Kotoamatsukami refers to a group of primordial, genderless deities that emerged at the moment of the universe's creation.

In Greek mythology, Phanes is a primordial, hermaphroditic deity who represents the first cosmic being, emerging from Chaos and embodying the generative principle of the universe. As the cosmic man, Phanes is seen as the source of creation, from whom all life and order originate.

In Hindu mythology, Purusha is a similar figure, who is considered the part of the individual which is immortal. Found in North East India, Kujum-Chantu is a female cosmic giant who remained still. Her body formed the earth and solar system upon death.

Gucumatz (also known as Kukulkan in some traditions) is a primordial creator deity in Maya mythology. In the Popol Vuh, Gucumatz creates the world and humanity from the primordial sea and mud, establishing the foundation for the cosmos and human existence.

In Mesopotamian mythology, the Cosmic Man archetype is exemplified by the god Marduk, who, after defeating the primordial chaos deity Tiamat, uses her body to create the world.

In Norse mythology, Ymir is the primeval, hermaphroditic giant whose body was the raw material for the creation of the cosmos, representing the initial state of chaos. After his death, the gods used his flesh to form the earth, his blood to create the seas, and his bones to make the mountains.

The Persian equivalent of Cosmic Man, Keyumars, released semen when he died, out of which came the first human couple, Mashya and Mashyana. In Zoroastrian creation stories found in Persia, modern-day Iran, the primordial figure Gayōmart becomes earths metals and produces the first humans from gold.

In some Polynesian traditions, Ta'aroa is a primordial deity who emerges from the cosmic egg and creates the world.

In Vietnamese mythology, Thần Trụ Trời is considered the primordial deity who created the world by erecting pillars to separate the heavens from the earth.

In some Jewish legends, Adam was created from dust from the four corners of the Earth, and, when bent down, his head was the East and his feet the West. In another legend, he contained the soul of everybody who would ever be born. In the teachings of Kabbalah, such a primordial man is referred to as Adam Kadmon. In Mandaeism, the primordial man is known as Adam Kasia, or "the hidden Adam."

== See also ==
- Cipactli
- Protoplast (religion)
- Tiamat
- Ymir
