= Divination =

Attempt to gain insight into a question or situation through magic or the supernatural

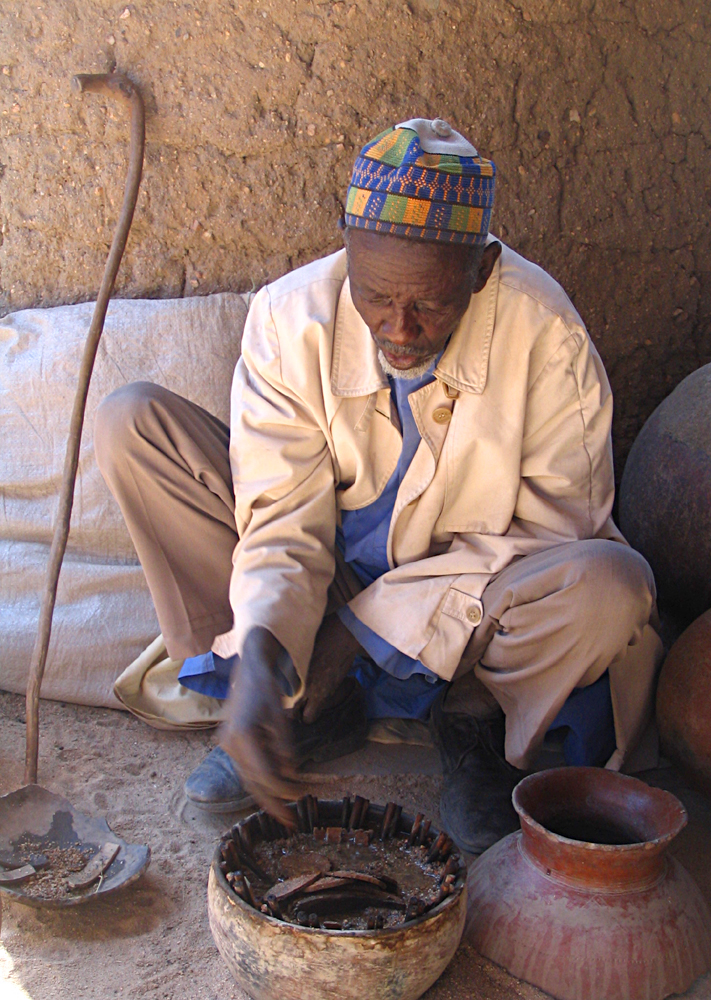
A man in Rhumsiki, Cameroon, attempts to tell the future by interpreting the changes in position of various objects as caused by a freshwater crab through the practice of nggàm.

Divination is the attempt to gain insight into a question or situation by way of a magic ritual or practice. Using various methods, throughout history, diviners have been providing answers to querents by reading signs, events, or omens, often claiming to receive insight through supernatural agents such as spirits, gods, god-like-beings or the "will of the universe".

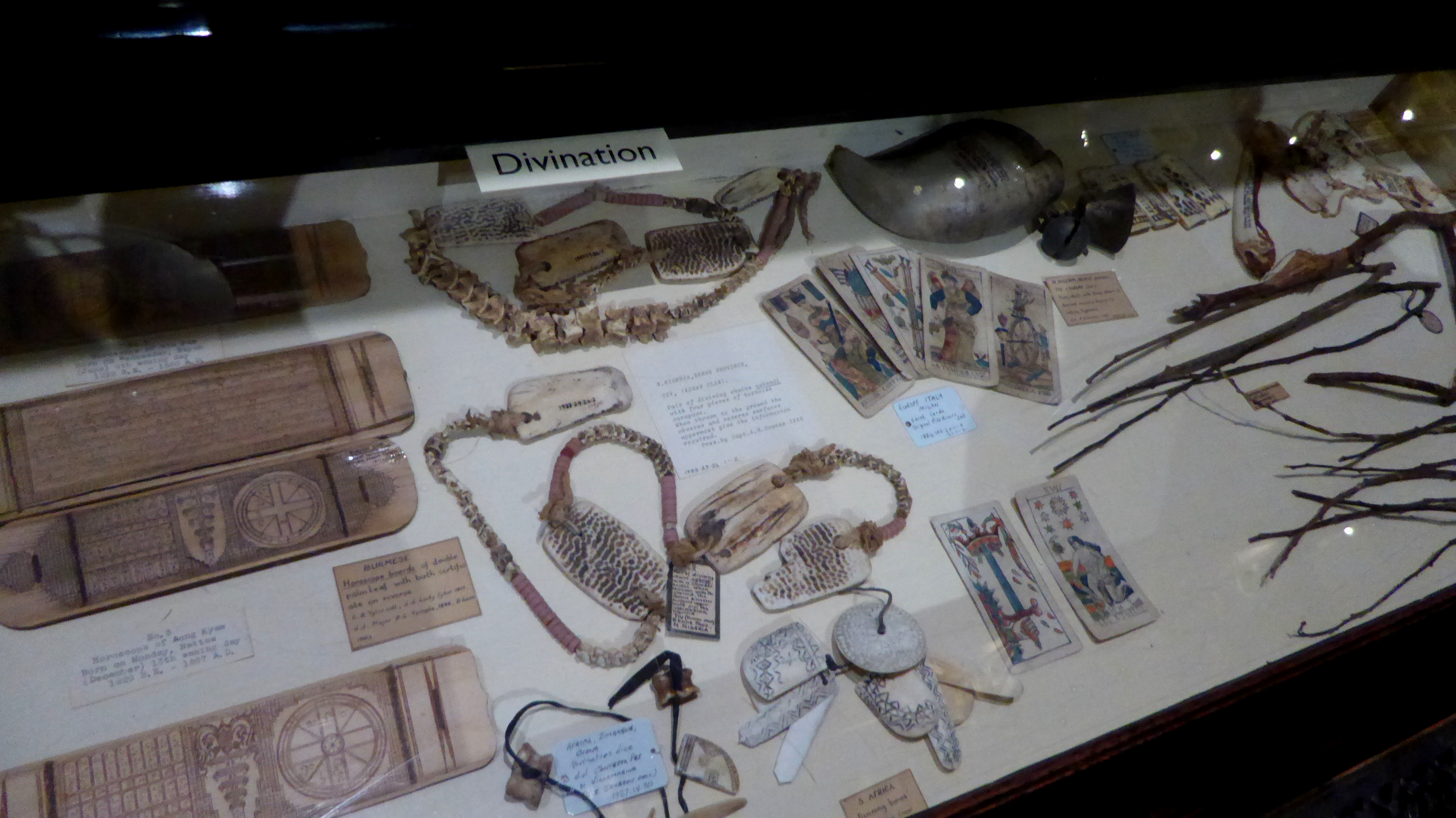
Display on divination, featuring a cross-cultural range of items, at the Pitt Rivers Museum in Oxford, England

Divination can be seen as an attempt to organize what appears to be random, so that it provides insight into a problem or issue at hand. Some practices of divination include astrology, Tarot card reading, rune casting, tea-leaf reading, Ouija boards, automatic writing, water scrying, numerology, pendulum divination and countless more. If a distinction is made between divination and fortune-telling, divination has a more formal or ritualistic element and often contains a more social character, usually in a religious context, as seen in traditional African medicine. Fortune-telling, on the other hand, is a more everyday practice for personal purposes. Particular divination methods vary by culture and religion.

In its functional relation to magic in general, divination can have a preliminary and investigative role:

the diagnosis or prognosis achieved through divination is both temporarily and logically related to the manipulative, protective or alleviative function of magic rituals. In divination one finds the cause of an ailment or a potential danger, in magic one subsequently acts upon this knowledge.

Divination has long attracted criticism. In the modern era, it has been dismissed by the scientific community and by skeptics as being superstitious. Rigorous experiments do not support the notion that divination can actually predict the future more precisely or reliably than would be possible without such techniques. In antiquity, divination came under attack from philosophers such as the Academic skeptic, Cicero in De Divinatione (1st century BCE) and the Pyrrhonist, Sextus Empiricus in Against the Astrologers (2nd century CE). The satirist Lucian (c. 125 – after 180) devoted an essay to Alexander the false prophet.

== History ==
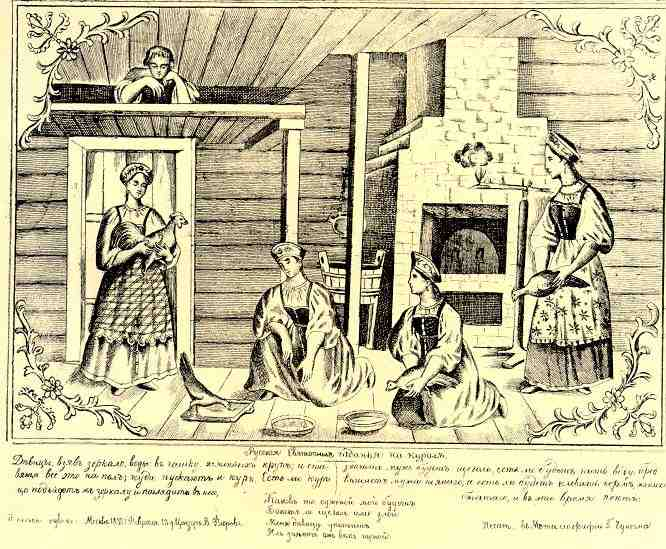
Russian peasant girls using chickens for divination; 19th-century lubok.

=== Antiquity ===
The eternal fire at Nymphaion in southern Illyria (present-day Albania) also functioned as an oracle. The forms of divination practiced in this natural fire sanctuary with peculiar physical properties were widely known to the ancient Greek and Roman authors. The Oracle of Amun at the Siwa Oasis was made famous when Alexander the Great visited it after conquering Egypt from Persia in 332 BC.

Deuteronomy 18:10–12 or Leviticus 19:26 can be interpreted as categorically forbidding divination but some biblical practices, such as Urim and Thummim, casting lots and prayer, are considered to be divination. Trevan G. Hatch disputes these comparisons because divination did not consult the "one true God" and manipulated the divine for the diviner's self-interest. One of the earliest known divination artifacts, a book called the Sortes Sanctorum, is believed to be of Christian roots, and utilizes dice to provide insight into the future.

Uri Gabbay states that divination was associated with sacrificial rituals in the ancient Near East, including Mesopotamia and Israel. Extispicy was a common example, where diviners would pray to their god(s) before vivisecting a sacrificial animal. Their abdominal organs would reveal a divine message, which aligned with cardiocentric views of the mind.

==== Oracles and Greek divination ====
Both oracles and seers in ancient Greece practiced divination. Oracles were the conduits for the gods on earth; their prophecies were understood to be the will of the gods, verbatim. Because of the high demand for oracle consultations and the oracles’ limited work schedule, they were not the main source of divination for the ancient Greeks. That role fell to the seers (Greek: μάντεις).

Seers were not in direct contact with the gods; instead, they were interpreters of signs provided by the gods. Seers used many methods to explicate the will of the gods including extispicy, ornithomancy, etc. They were more numerous than the oracles and did not keep a limited schedule; thus, they were highly valued by all Greeks, not just those with the capacity to travel to Delphi or other such distant sites.

The means of divining affected what questions could be asked, and the quality of the answer that could be provided. For example, sacrificial divination, a common practice of seers, may have been considered to only give yes or no answers. However, there are examples of seers being asked open-ended questions.

During battle, generals would frequently ask seers at both the campground (a process called the hiera) and at the battlefield (called the sphagia). The hiera entailed the seer slaughtering a sheep and examining its liver for answers regarding a more generic question; the sphagia involved killing a young female goat by slitting its throat and noting the animal's last movements and blood flow. The battlefield sacrifice only occurred when two armies prepared for battle against each other. Neither force would advance until the seer revealed appropriate omens.

Because the seers had such power over influential individuals in ancient Greece, many were skeptical of the accuracy and honesty of the seers. The degree to which seers were honest depended entirely on the individual seers. Despite the doubt surrounding individual seers, the craft as a whole was well regarded and trusted by the Greeks, and the Stoics accounted for the validity of divination in their physics.

Several legends exist about Greeks who tested oracles and got punished; some stories about foreigners like Egyptians and Persians who tested oracles by asking multiple questions and getting away with it also exist.

=== Middle Ages and Early Modern period ===
The divination method of casting lots (Cleromancy) was used by the remaining eleven disciples of Jesus in Acts 1:23–26 to select a replacement for Judas Iscariot. Given the earlier prohibition on divination, it is likely that the casting of lots was being used to discern God's will, rather than to foretell the future. The Apostle Paul's disapproval of such practices is clear from his handling of his encounter with the clairvoyant slave girl in Acts 16:16-19. This is consistent with the fact that divination was viewed as a pagan practice by Christian emperors during ancient Rome. It may also be significant that this method of discernment was used prior to the Holy Spirit's descent upon the church (Acts 2:1-12), since wisdom and knowledge are gifts of the Holy Spirit (1 Cor. 12:8), thus rendering the use of lots redundant.

In 692, the Quinisext Council, also known as the "Council in Trullo" in the Eastern Orthodox Church, passed canons to eliminate pagan and divination practices. Fortune-telling and other forms of divination were widespread through the Middle Ages. In the constitution of 1572 and public regulations of 1661 of the Electorate of Saxony, capital punishment was used on those predicting the future. Laws forbidding divination practice continue to this day. The Waldensians sect was accused of practicing divination.

Småland is famous for Årsgång, a practice which occurred until the early 19th century in some parts of Småland. Generally occurring on Christmas and New Year's Eve, it is a practice in which one would fast and keep themselves away from light in a room until midnight to then complete a set of complex events to interpret symbols encountered throughout the journey to foresee the coming year.

In Islam, astrology (‘ilm ahkam al-nujum), the most widespread divinatory science, is the study of how celestial entities could be applied to the daily lives of people on earth. It is important to emphasize the practical nature of divinatory sciences because people from all socioeconomic levels and pedigrees sought the advice of astrologers to make important decisions in their lives. Astronomy was made a distinct science by intellectuals who did not agree with the former, although distinction may not have been made in daily practice, where astrology was technically outlawed and only tolerated if it was employed in public. Astrologers, trained as scientists and astronomers, were able to interpret the celestial forces that ruled the "sub-lunar" to predict a variety of information from lunar phases and drought to times of prayer and the foundation of cities. The courtly sanction and elite patronage of Muslim rulers benefited astrologers’ intellectual statures.

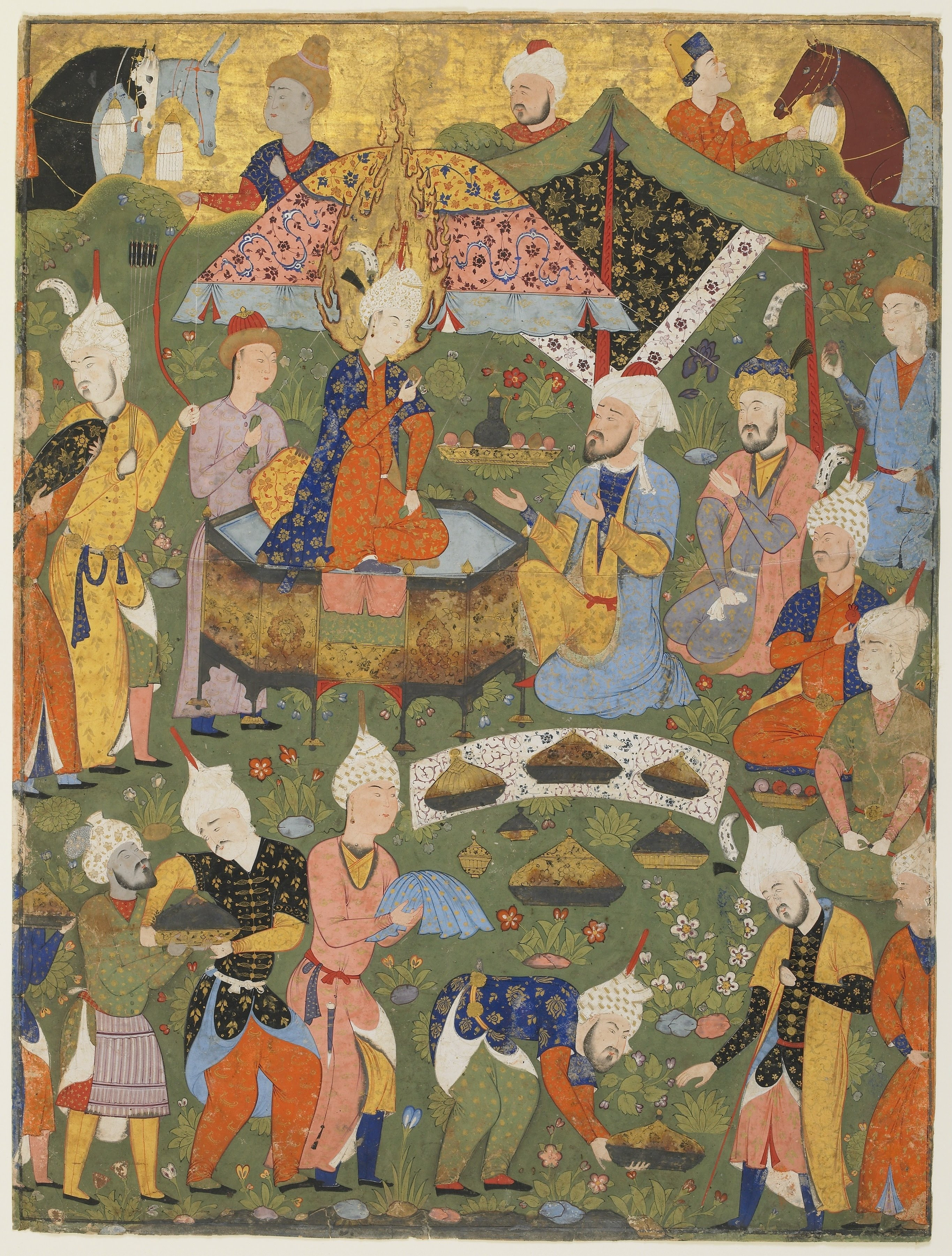
Joseph Enthroned. Folio from the "Book of Omens" (Falnama), Safavid dynasty. 1550. Freer Gallery of Art. This painting would have been positioned alongside a prognostic description of the meaning of this image on the page opposite (conventionally to the left). The reader would flip randomly to a place in the book and digest the text having first viewed the image.

The “science of the sand” (‘ilm al-raml), otherwise translated as geomancy, is “based on the interpretation of figures traced on sand or other surface known as geomantic figures.” It is a good example of Islamic divination at a popular level. The core principle that meaning derives from a unique occupied position is identical to the core principle of astrology.

Like astronomy, geomancy used deduction and computation to uncover significant prophecies as opposed to omens (‘ilm al-fa’l), which were processes of “reading” visible random events to decipher the invisible realities from which they originated. It was upheld by prophetic tradition and relied almost exclusively on text, specifically the Qur’an (which carried a table for guidance) and poetry, as a development of bibliomancy. One example for this is this Qur'an from Gwalior, India, which includes a set of instructions to use the Qur’an as a divinatory text. It is the earliest known example of its kind. The practice culminated in the appearance of the illustrated “Books of Omens” (Falnama) in the early 16th century, an embodiment of the apocalyptic fears as the end of the millennium in the Islamic calendar approached.

Dream interpretation, or oneiromancy (‘ilm ta’bir al-ru’ya), is more specific to Islam than other divinatory science, largely because of the Qur’an’s emphasis on the predictive dreams of Abraham, Yusuf, and Muhammad. The important delineation within the practice lies between "incoherent dreams" and "sound dreams," which were "a part of prophecy" or heavenly messages. Dream interpretation was always tied to Islamic religious texts, providing a moral compass to those seeking advice. The practitioner needed to be skilled enough to apply the individual dream to general precedent while appraising the singular circumstances.

The power of text held significant weight in the "science of letters" (‘ilm al-huruf), the foundational principle being "God created the world through His speech." The science began with the concept of language, specifically Arabic, as the expression of "the essence of what it signifies." Once the believer understood this, while remaining obedient to God’s will, they could uncover the essence and divine truth of the objects inscribed with Arabic like amulets and talismans through the study of the letters of the Qur’an with alphanumeric computations.

In Islamic practices in Senegal and Gambia, just like many other West African countries, diviners and religious leaders and healers were interchangeable because Islam was closely related with esoteric practices (like divination), which were responsible for the regional spread of Islam. As scholars learned esoteric sciences, they joined local non-Islamic aristocratic courts, who quickly aligned divination and amulets with the "proof of the power of Islamic religion." So strong was the idea of esoteric knowledge in West African Islam, diviners and magicians uneducated in Islamic texts and Arabic bore the same titles as those who did.

From the beginning of Islam, there "was (and is) still a vigorous debate about whether or not such [divinatory] practices were actually permissible under Islam,” with some scholars like Abu-Hamid al Ghazili (d. 1111) objecting to the science of divination because he believed it bore too much similarity to pagan practices of invoking spiritual entities that were not God. Other scholars justified esoteric sciences by comparing a practitioner to "a physician trying to heal the sick with the help of the same natural principles."

=== Mesoamerica ===
Divination was a central component of ancient Mesoamerican religious life. Many Aztec gods, including central creator gods, were described as diviners and were closely associated with sorcery. Tezcatlipoca was the patron of sorcerers and practitioners of magic. His name means "smoking mirror," a reference to a device used for divinatory scrying. In the Mayan Popol Vuh, the creator gods Xmucane and Xpiacoc performed divinatory hand casting during the creation of people. The Aztec Codex Borbonicus shows the original human couple, Oxomoco and Cipactonal, engaged in divining with kernels of maize. This primordial pair is associated with the ritual calendar, and the Aztecs considered them to be the first diviners.

Every civilization that developed in pre-Columbian Mexico, from the Olmecs to the Aztecs, practiced divination in daily life, both public and private. Scrying through the use of reflective water surfaces, mirrors, or the casting of lots were among the most widespread forms of divinatory practice. Visions derived from hallucinogens were another important form of divination, and are still widely used among contemporary diviners of Mexico. Among the more common hallucinogenic plants used in divination are morning glory, jimson weed, and peyote.

== Contemporary divination in Asia ==
=== India and Nepal ===
Theyyam or "theiyam" in Malayalam is the process by which a devotee invites a Hindu god or goddess to use his or her body as a medium or channel and answer other devotees' questions. The same is called "arulvaakku" or "arulvaak" in Tamil, another south Indian language - Adhiparasakthi Siddhar Peetam is famous for arulvakku in Tamil Nadu. The people in and around Mangalore in Karnataka call the หมอดู same, Buta Kola, "paathri" or "darshin"; in other parts of Karnataka, it is known by various names such as, "prashnaavali", "vaagdaana", "asei", "aashirvachana", and so on. In Nepal it is known as, "Devta ka dhaamee" or "jhaakri".

In English, the closest translation for these is, "oracle." The Dalai Lama, who lives in exile in northern India, still consults an oracle known as the Nechung Oracle, which is considered the official state oracle of the government of Tibet. The Dalai Lama has according to centuries-old custom, consulted the Nechung Oracle during the new year festivities of Losar.

China

Oracle bone and milfoil divination

In China, there are many forms of divination that take place. One example includes oracle bone divination that happened primarily during the Shang Dynasty. Oracle bone divination was performed by a diviner, or zhenren. The process of oracle bone divination was fairly simple. The divination expert would write an inscription on the bone and interpret the cracks that were formed from the heat that was placed on it (Sullivan 2018). The bones would usually be the scapula of a pig, ox, or sheep. The bones would have carved, burned, or ink written inscriptions that would consist of giving a yes or no to the emperor’s ideas or plans for the dynasty. The oracle bones shed light on the kingdom’s harvest, war, weather, hunting, astronomy, and more. The early Shang and Zhou traditions of oracle bone divination and prognostication led to milfoil divination, or yarrow-stalk divination, which is numerical divination with hexagrams. The numerical aspect derives from the ancient numerical system of bagua or three trigrams (Yachu and Yu 1981-82). Milfoil is the method in which the I-Ching divination is carried out, as they both use hexagrams and yarrow-stalks to complete the act of divination. The only difference is from which they derive. I-Ching derives from the Book of Changes, while milfoil derives from Shang and Zhou oracle bone divination.

I-Ching divination

I-Ching divination proves to be an important part of East Asian divination and history. I-Ching was called the Book of Changes, and consisted of written divination and philosophy. Confucianism and fundamental ideas in Daoism were incredibly influenced by the Book of Changes. Because China and Japan were in close contact with each other, the importance of I-Ching bled over to Japan during the 6th century. I-Ching was not originally popular in Japan, but as time progressed and the 13th century came around, its popularity came to be. The rise of I-Ching popularity came because of the rise of Neo-Confucianism, Zen Buddhist monks, and the concept of changes fit with the rockiness of the medieval period of Japan (NG, W.-M, 1997). I-Ching divination in its totality highlights the changing of the cosmos and the guiding human action through the use of symbolic hexagrams (Cheng 1977). The hexagrams represent a specific situation and are made through the throwing of stalks or coins.

=== Japan ===
Although Japan retains a history of traditional and local methods of divination, such as onmyōdō, contemporary divination in Japan, called uranai, derives from outside sources. Contemporary methods of divination in Japan include both Western and Chinese astrology, geomancy or feng shui, tarot cards, I Ching (Book of Changes) divination, and physiognomy (methods of reading the body to identify traits).

In Japan, divination methods include Futomani from the Shinto tradition. Futomani is the Shinto tradition of divining from the shoulder blade bone of a sacred deer.

==== Personality types ====
Personality typing as a form of divination has been prevalent in Japan since the 1980s. Various methods exist for divining personality type. Each attempt to reveal glimpses of an individual's destiny, productive and inhibiting traits, future parenting techniques, and compatibility in marriage. The personality type is increasingly important for Japanese youth, who consider personality the driving factor of compatibility, given the ongoing marriage drought and birth rate decline in Japan.

An import to Japan, Chinese zodiac signs based on the birth year in 12 year cycles (rat, ox, tiger, hare, dragon, snake, horse, sheep, monkey, cock, dog, and boar) are frequently combined with other forms of divination, such as so-called 'celestial types' based on the planets (Saturn, Venus, Mars, Jupiter, Mercury, or Uranus). The personality can also be divined using the cardinal directions, the four elements (water, earth, fire, air), and yin-yang. Names can also lend important personality information under name classification which asserts that names bearing certain Japanese vowel sounds (a, i, u, e, o) share common characteristics. Numerology, which utilizes methods of divining 'birth numbers' from significant numbers such as birth date, may also reveal character traits of individuals.

Individuals can also assess their own and others' personalities according to physical characteristics. Blood type remains a popular form of divination from physiology. Stemming from Western influences, body reading or ninsou, determines personality traits based on body measurements. The face is the most commonly analyzed feature, with eye size, pupil shape, mouth shape, and eyebrow shape representing the most important traits. An upturned mouth may be cheerful, and a triangle eyebrow may indicate that someone is strong-willed.

Methods of assessment in daily life may include self-taken measurements or quizzes. As such, magazines targeted at women in their early-to-mid twenties feature the highest concentration of personality assessment guides. There are approximately 144 different women's magazines, known as nihon zashi koukoku kyoukai, published in Japan aimed at this audience.

==== Japanese tarot ====
The adaptation of the Western divination method of tarot cards into Japanese culture presents a particularly unique example of contemporary divination, as this adaptation mingles with Japan's robust visual culture. Japanese tarot cards are created by professional artists, advertisers, and fans of tarot. One tarot card collector claimed to have accumulated more than 1,500 Japan-made decks of tarot cards.

Japanese tarot cards fall into diverse categories such as:

- Inspiration Tarot (reikan tarotto);
- I-Ching Tarot (ekisen tarotto);
- Spiritual Tarot (supirichuaru tarotto);
- Western Tarot (seiyō tarotto); and
- Eastern Tarot (tōyō tarotto).

The images on tarot cards may come from images from Japanese popular culture, such as characters from manga and anime including Hello Kitty, or may feature cultural symbols. Tarot cards may adapt the images of Japanese historical figures, such as high priestess Himiko (170–248CE) or imperial court wizard Abe no Seimei (921–1005CE). Still others may feature images of cultural displacement, such as English knights, pentagrams, the Jewish Torah, or invented glyphs. The introduction of such cards began by the 1930s and reached prominence in the 1970s. Japanese tarot cards were originally created by men, often based on the Rider-Waite-Smith tarot published by the Rider Company in London in 1909. Since then, the practice of Japanese tarot has become overwhelmingly feminine and intertwined with kawaii culture. Referring to the cuteness of tarot cards, Japanese model Kuromiya Niina was quoted as saying "because the images are cute, even holding them is enjoyable." While these differences exist, Japanese tarot cards function similarly to their Western counterparts. Cards are shuffled and cut into piles then used to forecast the future, for spiritual reflection, or as a tool for self-understanding.

=== Taiwan ===
A common act of divination in Taiwan is called the Poe. “The Poe” translated to English means “moon boards”. It consists of two wood or bamboo blocks cut into the shape of a crescent moon. The one edge is rounded while the other is flat; the two are mirror images. Both crescents are held out in one's palms and while kneeling, they are raised to the forehead level. Once in this position, the blocks are dropped and the future can be understood depending on their landing. If both fall flat side up or both fall rounded side up, that can be taken as a failure of the deity to agree. If the blocks land one rounded and one flat, the deity indicates "Yes", or positive. “Laughing poe” is when rounded sides land down and they rock before coming to a standstill. “Negative poe” is when the flat sides fall downward and abruptly stop; this indicates "No". When there is a positive fall, it is called “Sacred poe”, although the negative falls are not usually taken seriously. As the blocks are being dropped, the question is asked in a murmur, and if the answer is yes, the blocks are dropped again. To make sure the answer is definitely a yes, the blocks must fall in a “yes” position three times in a row.

A more serious type of divination is the Kiō-á. A small wooden chair, with small pieces of wood that can move up and down in their sockets around the sides of the chair, causing clicking sounds when the chair is moved in any way is used for this. Two men hold this chair by its legs before an altar, while the incense is being burned, and the deity is invited to descend onto the chair. It is seen that it is in the chair by an onset of motion. Eventually, the chair crashes onto a table prepared with wood chips and burlap. The characters on the table are then traced and these are said to be written by the deity who possessed the chair, these characters are then interpreted for the devotees.

== Contemporary divination in Africa ==
Divination is widespread throughout Africa. Among many examples it is one of the central tenets of Serer religion in Senegal. Only those who have been initiated as Saltigues (the Serer high priests and priestesses) can divine the future. These are the "hereditary rain priests" whose role is both religious and medicinal.

== See also ==
- Astrology
- Chinese fortune telling
- Fortune telling
- Geomancy
- Jiaobei
- Kau chim
- List of occult terms
- Methods of divination
- Oneiromancy
- Prophecy
- Qimen Dunjia
- Sandobele
- Shaobing Song
- Tengenjutsu (fortune telling)
- Tui bei tu
