= Progenitor =

Founder of a family lineage; often legendary

In genealogy, a progenitor (rarer: primogenitor) is the founder (sometimes one that is legendary) of a family, line of descent, gens, clan, tribe, noble house, or ethnic group. Genealogy (commonly known as family history) understands a progenitor to be the earliest recorded ancestor of a consanguineous family group of descendants.

Progenitors are sometimes used to describe the status of a genealogical research project, or in order to compare the availability of genealogical data in different times and places. Often, progenitors are implied to be patrilineal. If a patrilineal dynasty is considered, each such dynasty has exactly one progenitor.

Aristocratic and dynastic families often look back to an ancestor who is seen as the founder and progenitor of their house (i.e. family line). Even the old Roman legal concept of agnates (Latin for "descendants") was based on the idea of the unbroken family line of a progenitor, but only includes male members of the family, whilst the women were referred to as "cognatic".

It is rarely possible to confirm biological parenthood in the case of ancient family lines (see bastardy). In addition, the progenitor is often a distant ancestor, only known as a result of oral tradition. Where people groups and communities rely solely on a patrilinear family line, their common ancestor often became the subject of a legend surrounding the origin of the family. By contrast, families and peoples with a matrilinear history trace themselves back to an original female progenitrix. Matrilineal rules of descent are found in about 200 of the 1300 known indigenous peoples and ethnic groups worldwide, whilst around 600 have patrilineal rules of descent (from father to son).

In the mythological beliefs of the Romans the god of war, Mars, was viewed as the progenitor of the Romans; which is why the Mars symbol (♂, a shield and spear), is used to refer to the male sex. Besides cities and countries, ethnic groups may also have a progenitor (often a god) in their mythologies, for example, the Hellenistic Greeks look back to Hellen as their progenitor. In Indian Hinduism Manu is the progenitor of all mankind. In the Abrahamic religions, Adam, Noah, Abraham and others are described as progenitors (see also Biblical patriarchy).

In archaeogenetics (archaeological genetics), a human Y-chromosomal Adam has been named as the most recent common ancestor from whom all currently living people are descended patrilinearly. This Adam lived in Africa at a time variously estimated from 60,000 to 338,000 years ago. And Mitochondrial Eve, the most recent common ancestor in the matrilineal line, is estimated to have lived from 100,000 to 230,000 years ago. (There being no suggestion that these, “Eve” and “Adam”, lived at nearby times or places. And there were many other common ancestors in other lines of descent.)

== Examples of patrilineal progenitors ==
Progenitor	Date of progenitor's death	Dynasty	Subject
Polemon II of Pontus	74	Gediminas	King Gediminas of Lithuania
Keitai	10 March 531	Imperial House of Japan	Emperor Naruhito of Japan
Bishop Arnulf of Metz	640	Carolingian	Charlemagne
Ali	661	Hashemite	King Hussein bin Ali
Robert of Hesbaye	ca. 807	Robertians/Capetians	King Felipe VI of Spain
Robert of Hesbaye	ca. 807	Robertians/Capetians	Grand Duke Henri of Luxembourg
Piast the Wheelwright	861	Piast dynasty	George William, Duke of Liegnitz and Brieg
Otbert I, Count Palatine of Italy	975	Este	Queen Victoria of the United Kingdom
Dietrich I of Wettin	ca. 976	Wettin	Queen Elizabeth II of the United Kingdom
Dietrich I of Wettin	ca. 976	Wettin	King Philippe of the Belgians
Elimar I, Count of Oldenburg	1112	Oldenburg	Queen Margrethe II of Denmark
Elimar I, Count of Oldenburg	1112	Oldenburg	King Haakon VIII of Norway
Elimar I, Count of Oldenburg	1112	Oldenburg	King Charles III of the United Kingdom

== See also ==
- Protoplast, progenitors of mankind in a creation story
- Ancestor
- Ahnentafel
- Legendary progenitor
- Progenitor cell
