= Lozi mythology =

South African native mythology

The Lozi people believed in a creator god, whom the Lozi call Nyambe. Nyambe's wife was Nasilele (which means "she who is associated with long things") and his mother was Ngula (which means "she who is pregnant"). Nyambe is said to have created both his wife and his mother. He is also said to have created everything else that exists, including the heaven, the Earth and all the plants and animals.

== The founding myths ==
The Lozi founding myth is not cast in stone, there are several versions of it, depending on who is telling the story. Like any other oral tradition, it has changed with the passage of time, but there are some elements that do not change, such as the name of the creator god, the name of the first man, and the name of the first sovereign.

The three versions of the Lozi founding myth given below are not the only ones.

=== Nyambe flees from Kamunu ===
One of Nyambe's creations was Kamunu, the first human being. Nyambe gave Kamunu the task of naming all the other creations and told the human being that all the animals were his siblings. As such he should look after them.

Kamunu, being the most intelligent of all Nyambe's creations, rapidly learned and copied Nyambe's various skills: the mastery over fire; the forging of metal; the art of moulding pottery; the carving of spoons, plates and canoes; the sowing of crops; and the domestication of animals. Although Nyambe was at first impressed, he soon became tired of Kamunu's mimicry, especially when the man started killing the animals and cooking their meat for food. Nyambe told Kamunu not to kill the other creatures but Kamunu would not stop. To punish this misbehaviour, Nyambe begun taking away Kamunu's possessions: first his pot broke, then his dog died and eventually his son died. This, according to the Lozi, was the way that death came to the human race.

In frustration, Nyambe moved away from Kamunu on several occasions but, wherever Nyambe moved to on the Zambezi floodplains, Kamunu would follow. Eventually Nyambe decided to cross the Zambezi River, but Kamunu carved a canoe and followed. Nyambe built a mountain and lived on its summit, but Kamunu climbed the mountain and found Nyambe. Finally, Nyambe decided to move away from Earth into heaven (called Litooma in Lozi mythology). To accomplish this, and to prevent Kamunu from following, Nyambe instructed a spider to weave a web. Once Nyambe had used the spider's web to climb into Litooma, he blinded the spider so that it would not tell Kamunu how to get to heaven.

That is how Kamunu remained on Earth, condemned to live and die here after Nyambe refused to provide medicine to prevent disease and death. Hence death is Kamunu's divine punishment for his disobedient behaviour.

=== Nyambe founds the Lozi nation ===
In this version, Nyambe is shown to be the founder of the Lozi nation. Nyambe and his wife Nasilele had a daughter Mwambwa (which means "one who is being talked about"). In a variation on this theme, Nyambe is said to have created many wives for himself and had children by all of them. When Mwambwa had grown up, Nyambe fell in love with her and had incestuous sexual intercourse with her. When Nasilele found out what had happened between her husband and her daughter, she quarrelled with her husband and beat her daughter. Nyambe was so upset by his wife's behaviour that he called his servant, Sasisho, and announced his decision to return to heaven. Nyambe ordered a spider to spin a web, so that he and his servant could climb to heaven leaving Nasilele on Earth. Due to her remorse, Nasilele died a few weeks later.

Mwambwa, the daughter of Nyambe and Nasilele, later became the first Luyi sovereign and, therefore, founder of the nation. Her eldest daughter, whose name was Mbuyu and who was presumably conceived from the incest with Nyambe, took over the sovereignty from her mother.

=== Nyambe founds the Lozi nation as the first person ===
In this version of the founding myth, Nyambe was not the creator god but was the first human being. All Luyi peoples were said to have originated from him. In this account, the identity of the Creator is not stated explicitly. Instead, the people in the myth are simply stated to have been living on the Zambezi floodplains. Nyambe's village was called Litooma-mundi-wa-Nyambe (which means "heaven, the home of Nyambe" in Luyana) and his first wife was called Mwambwa. She later became the first female chief of the Luyi people. Through this myth, the Lozi royalty was said to originate from Mwambwa. She was, therefore, given the title Njemakati (which means "a woman from whom the kingdom originates"). She is also said to have given birth to nine other children, including a daughter named Mbuyu, who took over the sovereignty from her mother.
