= Keyumars =

Mythological Iranian king

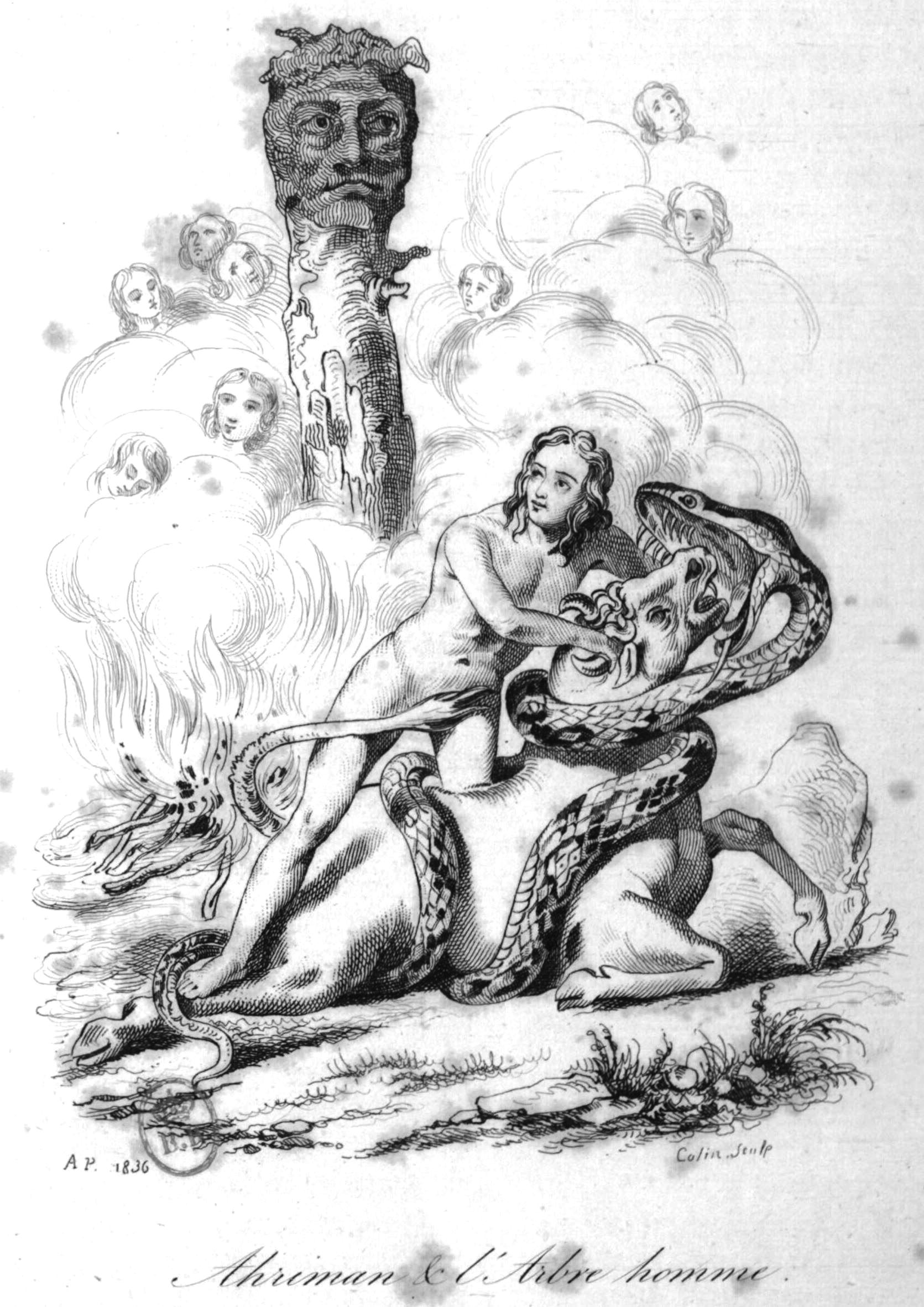
- Ahriman, in the form of a serpent, suffocates the primordial bull, from which the primordial man Keyumars emerges.

Keyumars or Kiomars (Note: Persian: کیومرث Middle Persian: 𐭪𐭣𐭬𐭫𐭲, romanized: Kayōmart) (Note: Also known as Gayomart: Avestan: 𐬔𐬀𐬌𐬌𐬊 𐬨𐬆𐬭𐬆𐬙𐬀𐬥) is a legendary figure from Iranian mythical history, appearing in both the Avesta and the Shahnameh.

In the Avesta he is the mythological first human being in the world. The Avestan form means "the living mortal", from gaya 'life' and marətan 'mortal, human being'; cf. Persian mard 'human' (مَرد). The corresponding name in Middle Persian is 𐭪𐭣𐭬𐭫𐭲 Kayōmart. In Ferdowsi's Shahnameh he appears as the first shah of the world. He is also called the pēšdād (پيشداد), the first to practice justice, the lawgiver.

== In Zoroastrian literature ==
According to the Zoroastrian creation myth, Gayōmart, who was neither male nor female, was the first human, or, according to the Avesta, he was the first person to worship Ahura Mazda. The Avestan forms Mashya and Mashyana appear as the male and female first humans; their names are versions of the word marətan 'mortal'.

In the eighth book of the Denkard, a reference is made to the lost Chihrdad nask (one of the 21 volumes of the Sasanian Avesta). Apparently, this volume dealt with how the world and mankind were created, including the creation of Gayōmart. References are also made to the Varshtmānsar nask, which also included information about Gayōmart which Ahura Mazda had given to Zoroaster: "For 30 centuries I kept the world from corruption and decay, when the 30th century came to an end the Dīvs assaulted Gayōmart ... But I finally repelled them and plunged them into the darkness".

=== The story of his creation ===
A concise summary of the story of Gayōmart according to Middle Persian texts is given by Zabihollah Safa:

Gayōmart Gar-shāh (King of the Mountains) was the first human Uhrmazd created. Before Gayōmart came, in the fifth "Gāh" (Ahura Mazda created the world in six Gāhs) Gavevagdāt (the primordial ox) had been created from mud in Erān-vēdj (which was the middle of the earth) on the right side of the river "Veh-Dāit" ... In the sixth "Gāh" Gayōmart was created from mud ... on the left side of "Veh-Dāit", to help Uhrmazd and he was created in the form of a 15-year-old boy. They lived for 3000 years in peace, neither eating, speaking nor praying, although Gayōmart was inwardly considering these things. At the end of this 3000-year period (during which Ahriman lay stunned by Uhrmazd's Ahunawar incantation and could do nothing) Jēh (the demonic whore) cried out, awakening him ... whereupon Ahriman and his minions the Dīvs fought with the light and, on the first day of spring (i.e. the 1st of Farvardin, the Iranian New Year) Ahriman leaped forth onto the earth in the form of a dragon. He started to create death, illness, lust, thirst, hunger among all living things and disseminated throughout the world the Kyrm (the class of evil creeping things which includes reptiles, insects and rodents) [...] In the catastrophe Gavevagdāt died (this being also the symbol of the old year giving way to the new, as depicted in Persepolis reliefs); and Ahriman left "Astovidat" (a Dīv) to guard Gayōmart, but could not kill him because his time had not yet come [...] he lived for 30 years afterwards and, when, finally, he died, fell upon his left side and shed his semen upon the ground, which was then fertilized by the sun [...] and after 40 years there grew Mashya and Mashyana as two rhubarb plants ..."

But in other Zoroastrian traditions, it is said that Ahura Mazda married his daughter Spenta Armaiti and she gave birth to Keyumars, and later she gave birth to Mashya and Mashyana. These traditions are considered to be that Keyumars was born to the same mother as Mashya and Mashyana, and not that Mashya and Mashyana are the children of Keyumars.

== In the Shahnameh ==
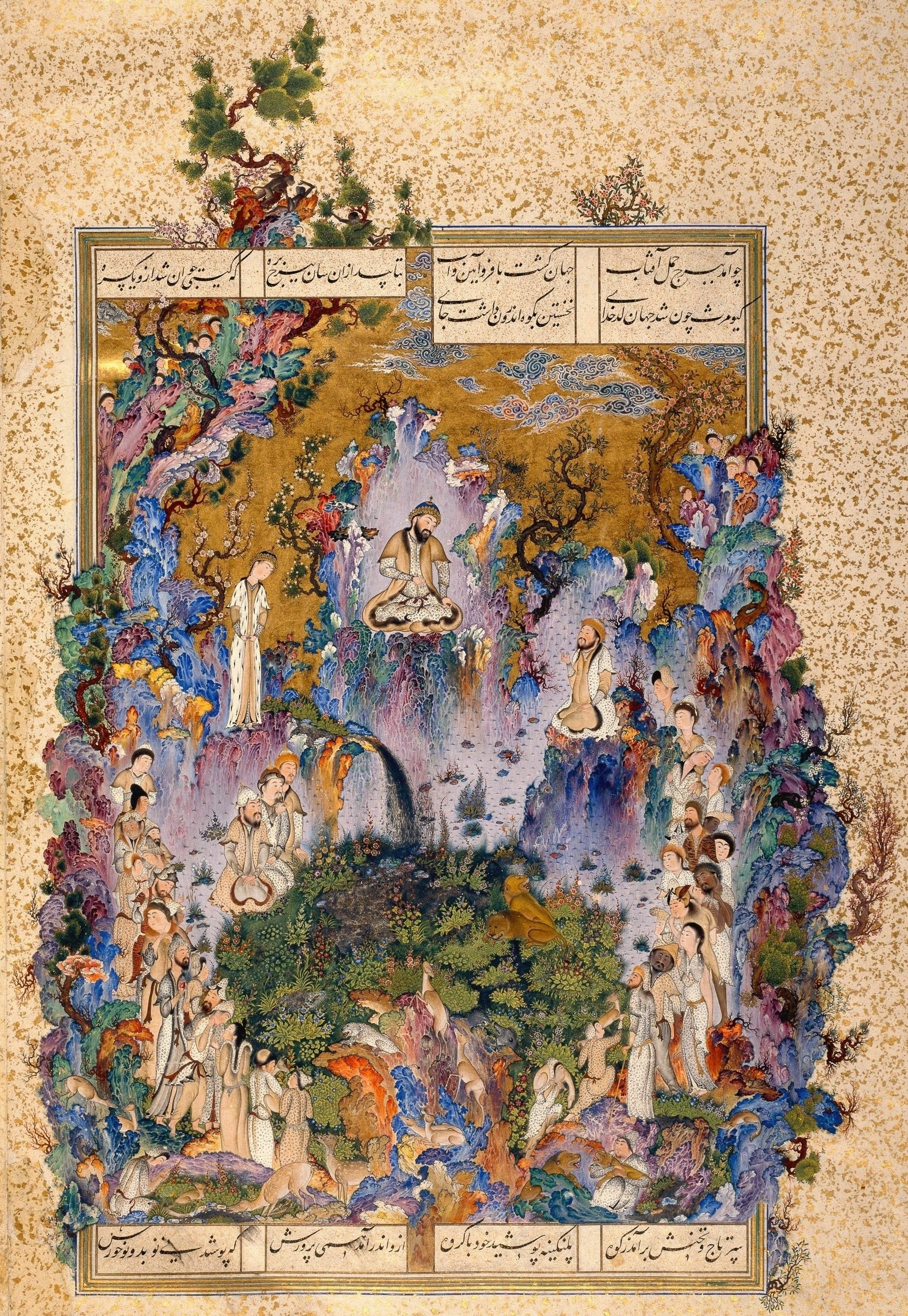
Court of Keyumars, 16th century Persian miniature from the Shahnameh of Shah Tahmasp

"What say you, old bard? Who first designed—
To gain the crown of power among mankind?

Who placed the diadem upon his brow?
The record of those days has perished now.

Unless one, having borne in memory,
Tales passed by father to son, declare to thee,

Who it was who first used the royal style—
And stood at the head of all the mighty file."

— Ferdowsi, Shahnameh

Ferdowsi's 11th-century epic poem, the Shahnameh, begins with the story of Keyumars. He was the first king to arise among humans, who at that time lived in mountain caves and wore the skins of leopards. Keyumars was also the first human to introduce royal practices and the preparation of food and was also the first practitioner of law and justice. He was so powerful that all humans, tame animals, and wild animals paid homage to him. God (Ahura Mazda) granted Keyumars the supernatural radiance called the farr (Avestan xvarənah), reserved for kings. His son Siāmak (سیامک) was beloved of all except the Devil, Ahriman, who raised an army under the command of his own demonic son. When the angel Sorush (Avestan Sraoša) warned Keyumars, Siāmak led an army of his own. Siāmak accepted a challenge to single combat and died at the hands of the demon.

Keyumars mourned for a year, and then Sorush advised him to fight Ahriman once more. Siāmak's son Hushang (Avestan Haošyaŋha) was grown by this time and led the army that defeated Ahriman's son, who was bound and beheaded. Keyumars died after a thirty-year reign, leaving his throne to Hushang.

== In Islamic sources ==
Al-Masudi reports a different story in his Meadows of Gold, according to him, the people who lived between Adam and Noah spoke Syriac and obeyed no king, Keyumars was only the first and most powerful among his contemporaries. This is the reason that led them to choose a king and to give themselves a leader. They recognized that revolt, envy, tyranny, and hatred are innate in man, and that only fear can bring him back to good. After some deliberation, they went to Keyumars and explained to him their need for a just king, and said to him: “You are the greatest and noblest among us, you are the last descendant of our common father, and you have no equal in this age. Take charge of our affairs and become our leader; we will, in return, offer you respect, obedience, and absolute submission to your commands.”, Keyumars agreed to their request, and made them swear that they would obey him and renounce any attempt at revolt.

Al-Tabari identifies several possible Biblical figures as being Keyumars: Adam, one of Adam's children, or Gomer, however he doesn't focus on that, as he writes "The discussion of the different views on the pedigree of a given king is not the kind of subject for which we have undertaken the composition of the book." Aside from this, Tabari tells that Keyumars was a "long-lived lord" who settled in the mountains of Dunbawand in Tabaristan. Tabari then says that Keyumars had 30 wives, and his two favourite children were named Mari and Mariyanah, he liked them, and according to Tabari, they were promoted, and their descendants were the later kings of Persia.

== See also ==
- Cosmic Man

== Notes ==
Preceded by none	Legendary Kings of the Shāhnāmeh; 0–30	Succeeded by Hushang
