= LDS =

LDS may refer to:

== Organizations ==
=== Education ===
- Lambda Delta Sigma, a Greek society at Concordia College

=== Religion ===
- Latter Day Saint movement (LDS movement), a collection of independent church groups
  - The Church of Jesus Christ of Latter-day Saints, the largest group within the Latter Day Saint movement
- Latvijas Dievturu Sadraudze, a Latvian neopagan organization

=== Politics ===
- Liberal Democracy of Slovenia, a political party in Slovenia
- Liberal Democratic Party (Serbia, 1989), a defunct political party in Serbia
- Linyon Demokratik Seselwa, a political party in Seychelles

=== Other ===
- LDS Hospital, Salt Lake City, Utah, US

== Science, technology and engineering ==
- Laser direct structuring, a manufacturing method
- LDS fluid, a Citroën hydraulic fluid
- LDS (automobile), South African racing cars
- Leak detection system, for fluids
- Lipodermatosclerosis, a skin and connective tissue disease, affecting the lower extremities
- Lymphedema–distichiasis syndrome, a genetic disorder of eyelashes and lymphatic system
- Loeys–Dietz syndrome, a genetic disorder affecting connective tissue
- LDS-1 (Line Drawing System-1), an early computer graphics system

== Places ==
- Yichun Lindu Airport (IATA airport code), China
- Leeds railway station (National Rail station code), England
- Landkreis Dahme-Spreewald, a district in Germany

== Other uses ==
- League Division Series, a round of playoffs in Major League Baseball
- Licentiate in Dental Surgery, a dental degree
- Love and Deepspace, a mobile game

== See also ==
- LSD (disambiguation)
