= List of protoplasts in religion =

Religious concept of first human

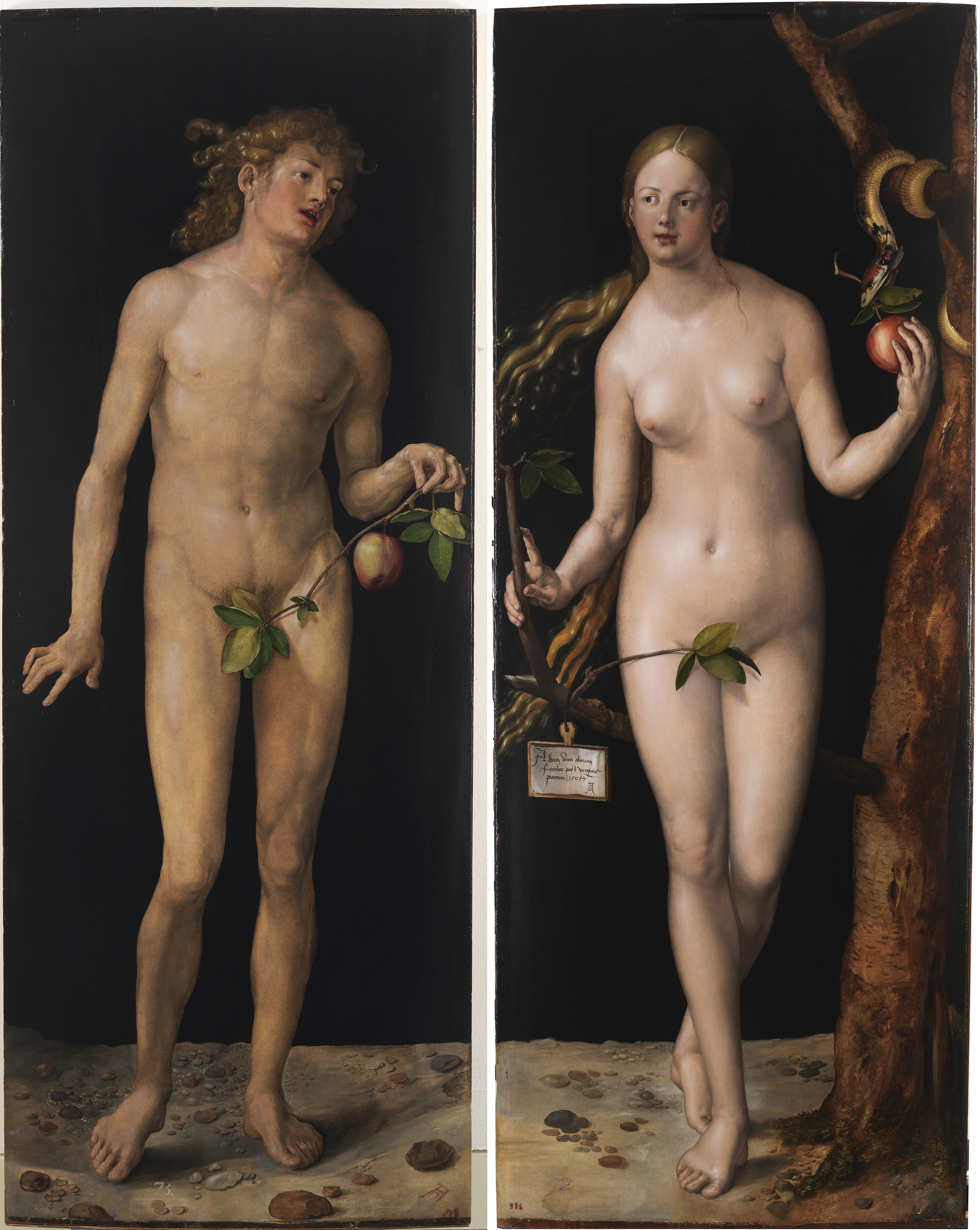
Adam and Eve by Albrecht Dürer

A protoplast, from ancient Greek πρωτόπλαστος (prōtóplastos, "first-formed"), in a religious context initially referred to the first human or, more generally, to the first organized body of progenitors of humankind (as in Adam and Eve or Manu and Shatrupa), or of surviving humanity after a cataclysm (as in Deucalion or Noah).

== List of protoplasts ==
Abrahamic mythology

- Adam and Eve
- Noah
- Adam Kadmon (esoteric)
- Adam kasia ("hidden Adam") and Adam pagria ("bodily Adam") (esoteric), in Mandaeism
- Lilith (esoteric)

Australian Aboriginal mythology

- Wurugag and Waramurungundi
- Yhi
- Kidili

Ayyavazhi mythology

- Kaliyan and Kalicchi

Aztec mythology

- Tata/Coxcox and Nana/Xochitl – new progenitors of humankind after the flood
- Oxomoco and Cipactonal – first human couple created

Baganda

- Kintu

Berber

- Iarbas or Garamas – first man (according to Greek sources)

Cherokee

- Selu and Kanati

Chinese folk religion

- Fu Xi and Nüwa (sometimes said to be created by Pangu)
- Pangu

Cowichan peoples

- Quiltumtun

Germanic mythology

- Tuiscon – first ancestor of Germans

Greek mythology

- Pandora – first woman
- Epimetheus – first man (by some accounts)
- Pelasgus – first man (by some accounts)
- Alalcomenes – first man (by some accounts)
- Kouretes – first race (by some accounts)
- Korybantes – first race (by some accounts)
- Deucalion and Pyrrha (the first postdiluvian humans)

Hawaiian religion

- Laʻilaʻi – first woman
- Kiʻi – first man

Hindu mythology

- Svayambhuva Manu and Shatarupa (first couple on earth)
- Including Vaivasvata Manu and Shraddha (wife of Vaivasvata Manu) of current Manvantara

Inca mythology

- Pacha Camac

Lakota people

- Tokahe – first human emerged from the underworld
- Wa and Ka

Māori mythology

- Tiki and Marikoriko

Muisca mythology

- Tena and Fura

Navajo mythology

- Áłtsé Hastiin and Áłtsé Asdzą́ą́

Norse mythology

- Ask and Embla (former)
- Líf and Lífþrasir (future)

Philippine mythology

- Malakas (strong) and Maganda (beautiful)
- Silalac and Sivacay (Hiligaynon)

Polynesian mythology

- Ele'ele
- Kumu-Honua and Lalo-Honua
- Marikoriko and Tiki
- Tu-Mea
- Tonga
- Vatea and Papa

Shinto mythology

- Izanagi and Izanami

Traditional African religions

- Kikuyu
  - Gikuyu and Mumbi
- Lozi mythology
  - Kamunu (first human created by Nyambe)
- Serer creation myth
  - YAAB and YOP (first human couple, female and male respectively, created by Roog in Serer religion)
  - Unan and Ngoor (two mythical figures in the Serer creation myth and early ancestors of humanity, female and male respectively)
  - Jambooñ and Agaire (two sisters and early ancestors of the Serer and Jola people respectively whose pirogue broke at the Point of Sangomar, separating the two groups)

Turkic mythology

- Törüngey and Ece

Vietnamese mythology

- Lạc Long Quân and Âu Cơ

Yoruba mythology

- Oduduwa and Obatala
- Iya Nla

Zoroastrian mythology

- Keyumars
- Mahabad
- Mashya and Mashyana

== See also ==
- Cosmic Man
- Discovery of human antiquity
- Eponymous ancestor
- Mitochondrial Eve
- Y-chromosome Adam
