= Kumu-Honua =

First man in Hawaiian religion

In Hawaiian religion, Kumu-Honua ("first on Earth") is the first man.

He was created from muddy water in the fashion of steam ascending upwards and married to Lalo-Honua; the couple was given a garden by Kāne and were forbidden from eating a particular fruit.

This story may be in whole or in part Christianized.
