= Mashya and Mashyana =

First man and woman in Zoroastrian cosmogony

According to the Zoroastrian cosmogony, Mashya and Mashyana were the first man and woman whose procreation gave rise to the human race.

== Etymology ==
The names are from Avestan, nominally transliterated as mašyā and mašyānē, but like other Avestan words also, spellings (and hence transliterations) vary from manuscript to manuscript. Mašyā may thus also appear as maṣ̌iiā or maš́iiā or mašiiāi (and variants).

Originally and etymologically, Mašyā means "mortal being" as Old Persian martya, Persian mard and even Sanskrit martya also mean "mortal" and therefore "man". The root in Avesta and Sanskrit for death is mar, mr, "to die". The causative mâr means "to kill". Its derivatives merethyu/mrtyu means "death"; mareta and maretan means "mortal", and then "man, human being" mashya. For more on the etymology of the aša and arta variants of these terms, see Avestan phonology.

== Attestations ==
According to the creation myth as described in the Bundahishn, Ohrmuzd's sixth creation is the primeval beast Gayomart, who was neither male nor female. Ahriman, the Spirit of Evil that dwelt in the Absolute Darkness, sought to destroy all that Ohrmuzd had created, and sent the demoness Jeh to kill Gayomard. In this she was successful, but Mah, the moon, captured his seed before the animal died, from which all animal life then grew. From Gayomard's corpse grew a tree, the seeds of which were the origin of all plant life, and from the branches of which grew Mashya and Mashyana.

They promised to aid Ohrmuzd in his battle with Ahriman, and gave birth to fifteen sets of twins which scattered around the Earth and became the races of mankind.

== Theories ==
Indo-European connections to Ask and Embla have been proposed. In Norse mythology, Ask and Embla were the first man and woman, created from trees and given various gifts of life by three gods. According to Benjamin Thorpe "Grimm says the word embla, emla, signifies a busy woman, from amr, ambr, aml, ambl, assidous labour; the same relation as Meshia and Meshiane, the ancient Persian names of the first man and woman, who were also formed from trees."

Some researchers in comparative religion link them to Adam and Eve.

== See also ==
- Adam and Eve
- Ask and Embla
- Wurugag and Waramurungundi
