= Molded interconnect device =

A molded interconnect device (MID) is an injection-molded thermoplastic part with integrated electronic circuit traces. The use of high temperature thermoplastics and their structured metallization opens a new dimension of circuit carrier design to the electronics industry. This technology combines plastic substrate/housing with circuitry into a single part by selective metallization.

== Applications ==
Key markets for the MID technology are consumer electronic, telecommunication, automotive and medical. A very common application for MIDs are integrated antennas in cellphones and other mobile devices including laptops and netbooks.

== Manufacturing methods ==
Molded interconnect devices are typically manufactured in these technologies:

=== Laser Direct Structuring (LDS) ===
The LDS process uses a thermoplastic material, doped with a (non-conductive) metallic inorganic compound activated by means of laser. The basic component is single-component injection molded, with practically no restrictions in terms of 3D design freedom. A laser then writes the course of the later circuit trace on the plastic. Where the laser beam hits the plastic the metal additive forms a micro-rough track. The metal particles of this track form the nuclei for the subsequent metallization. In an electroless copper bath, the conductor path layers arise precisely on these tracks. Successively layers of copper, nickel and gold finish can be raised in this way.

The LDS process is characterized by:

- single-component injection molding
- a wide range of materials is available
- full three-dimensionality in a sphere
- flexibility: for a changed routing of traces, only new control data have to be transmitted to the laser unit. Thus different functional components can be produced from one basic unit
- precision: finest conductor pathes with a width of < 80 µm are possible
- prototyping: available LDS-coating of any part enables test specimen

Laser Direct Structuring was invented at Hochschule Ostwestfalen-Lippe, University of Applied Sciences in Lemgo, Germany, from 1997 until 2001. LDS technology was developed in a research cooperation with the former LPKF Limited, patented by the inventors, Gerhard Naundorf and Horst Wissbrok, and first exclusively licensed to LPKF. In 2002 the patents concerning LDS technology were transferred to LPKF Laser & Electronics AG.

The major drawbacks of LDS are the need for the expensive metallic inorganic compound for the entire mold, the necessity for a chemical plating process, a very rough surface of the plated layer making connectors difficult to achieve. The created circuitry usually is limited to only one layer of wiring without crosses.

=== Printed Electronics ===
Selective metallization can be achieved by printing of conductive traces (Printed Electronics) onto the surface of the thermoplastic part. Aerosol jet, inkjet, or screen printing may be used, whereas aerosol jet printing delivers the most reliable results on an arbitrary shaped mold.

The main advantages to PE include:

- any polymer can be used for injection molding
- no metallic inorganic compound is necessary, which reduces cost
- large variety of conductive coating materials including silver, copper, gold, platinum, graphite, and conductive polymers
- thickness can be tightly controlled
- direct deposition without plating possible
- more complex circuitry possible as isolation layers, dielectrics, and other materials can be deposited in multiple layers
- higher line precision of down to 10 µm
- higher surface smoothness

Currently, printed electronics is still a research and development area but an increasing number of companies start production of smart phone antennas and substitute LDS on other injection-molded parts.

The major drawback is a low level of standardization because of the versatility of the technique.

=== Two-shot molding ===
Two-shot molding is an injection molding process using two different resins and only one of the two resins is platable. Typically the platable substrate is ABS and the non-platable substrate is polycarbonate. In a two shot component, these are then submitted to an electroless plating process where the butadiene is used to chemically roughen the surface and allow adhesion of a copper primary layer. The plating chemistry can be controlled to prevent the roughening of the polycarbonate portions of the component. While not commonly found outside of cellphone antenna production, this technology is public and widely available.
