= Alcheringa =

Alcheringa may refer to:

- Alcheringa, an Aranda language word meaning The Dreaming, a concept in Aboriginal Australian mythology
- Alcheringa (journal), an Australian palaeontology journal
- Alcheringa (magazine), a magazine of ethnopoetics published from 1970 to 1980
- Alcheringa (festival), an annual cultural festival held once a year at the Indian Institute of Technology, Guwahati, India
- Alcheringa (TV series), 1962 Australian TV series about Aboriginal culture presented by Bill Onus
- Alcheringa Gallery, a Canadian gallery of contemporary aboriginal art
