= Lalo-Honua =

First woman in Hawaiian religion

In Hawaiian religion, Lalo-Honua (Hawaiian for "below the Earth") is the first woman.

She was married to Kumu-Honua and formed out of his side parts; the couple was given a garden by Kāne and were forbidden from eating a particular fruit.

This story may be in whole or in part Christianized.
