= Cipactonal =

Aztec god of astrology

- God of astrology and calendars
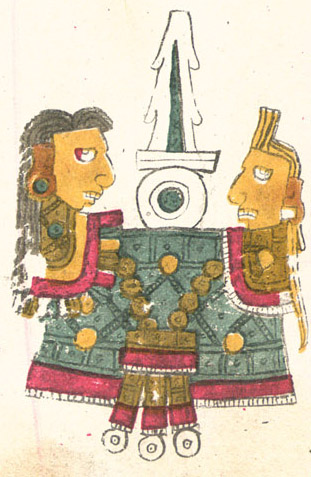
- Oxomoco and Cipactonal as shown in the Codex Borgia

Genealogy
- Consort: Oxomoco
- Children: Piltzin-tecuhtli

Cipactonal is the Aztec god of astrology and calendars. Oxomoco and Cipactonal were said to be the first human couple, and the Aztec comparison to Adam and Eve in regard to human creation and evolution. They bore a son named Piltzin-tecuhtli, who married a maiden, daughter of Xochiquetzal.

== Depictions ==
Oxomoco and Cipactonal are mentioned in the Aztec Annals of Cuautitlán; they were in charge of the calendar. They also appear in Quiché legends such as within the Popol Vuh. Some scholars, such as the Nicaraguan Fernández de Oviedo y Valdés claim that Cipactonal was actually the female and Oxomoco actually the male and referred to one of them as Tamagastad. Other scholars from the Nicaraguan perspective such as Ephraim George Squier and Frank E. Comparato also claim that Oxomoco was male and Cipactonal female and claim that they were sorcerers and magicians. Nahuatl terms of the four shamans who stayed at Tamoanchan are not gendered with the exception of Oxomoco who was female. In the Codex Borbonicus, Oxomoc, like Cipactonal, usually wears the tobacco gourd of priests on her back. In some depictions the goddess is wearing a butterfly mask and throwing maize and beans from a vessel. In the Florentine Codex, Oxomoco is depicted divining with knotted cords. There is a notable carving of Oxomoco and Cipactonal near Yauhtepec.
