= Wurugag and Waramurungundi =

First man and woman in aboriginal mythology

In Aboriginal Australian mythology (specifically: Kunwinjku), Wurugag and Waramurungundi are the first man and woman, respectively. Waramurungundi is said to have given birth to all living things and taught language to the people of Australia.
